= List of The Fenn Street Gang episodes =

This is a list of episodes from the London Weekend Television comedy series The Fenn Street Gang, a spin-off of Please Sir! A total of 21 episodes were broadcast between 1971 and 1973.

== Episodes ==
All of the descriptions are taken from the episode descriptions in the sleeves of the Fenn Street Gang DVDs, released by Network. All of the transmission dates are for the original London Weekend Television transmissions. Alternative transmissions on other ITV regions are not listed.

=== Series 1 ===
Series 1 was broadcast on Friday's at 8:30pm

No.	Title	Directed by	Written by	Original release date
1	"Should Auld Acquaintance"	David Askey	John Esmonde and Bob Larbey	17 September 1971
Guest: Christopher Biggins No longer able to say "Please Sir!" when they have a problem, Form 5C from Fenn Street Secondary Modern are out in the cold hard world. But school friendships die hard and the mob determine to preserve their group identity.
2	"The Start of Something Big"	David Askey	Geoff Rowley and Andy Baker	24 September 1971
Guest: Christopher Timothy Things are not going too smoothly for Eric and Sharon. While Eric is busy having a brush with the Law, Sharon realises that there are other fish in the sea. It is then that ace "tec" Frankie Abbott comes onto the scene – on his first case!
3	"Leave It to Me, Darling"	David Askey	John Esmonde and Bob Larbey	1 October 1971
Guest: John Alderton The Fenn Street Gang get a new member – Bernard Hedges
4	"Horses for Courses"	David Askey	Geoff Rowley and Andy Baker	8 October 1971
Guest: Sally Thomsett Dennis knows who his real friends are – or does he? Things come to a head when Maureen takes him to a party.
5	"Meet the Wizard"	David Askey	Geoff Rowley and Andy Baker	15 October 1971
Guests: John Alderton and Robin Askwith Penny (Bernard's wife) decides that a woman's place is certainly not at home but the problem is keeping her job a secret from Bernard, who has rather old-fashioned views on women. Because, when at last he does get off the dole, his new job brings him into contact with all sorts of people.
6	"Distant Horizons"	David Askey	Tony Bilbow	22 October 1971
Guest: Andria Lawrence The course of Duffy's and Sharon's true love never did run very smoothly, but as they grow older it becomes positively bumpy. When Sharon meets a sensitive student and Duffy gets his first taste of real competition, something just has to give . . .
7	"Change Partners"	David Askey	John Esmonde and Bob Larbey	29 October 1971
Guest: John Alderton Bernard still waits to start work at London University, while at home the bills keep on piling up. When a friend suggests a lucrative part-time job, he jumps at the chance but the kind of work involved makes him wished that he had looked before he leaped . . .
8	"The Thin Yellow Line"	Graham Evans	John Esmonde and Bob Larbey	5 November 1971
Guest: Tony Selby When the career of "Hank" Abbott, private detective come to an inglorious end, the British Army opens its arms to a new recruit. Had the Army realised what it was getting, the open arms might well have become clenched fists.
9	"All Mod Cons"	Graham Evans	Geoff Rowley and Andy Baker	12 November 1971
Guest: Dudley Foster When Dennis leaves home he finds he's taken on more than he can handle. So has Eric. He's taken on Peter Craven in an optimistic attempt to contemplate a decorating job.
10	"These Foolish Things"	Alan Wallis	John Esmonde and Bob Larbey	19 November 1971
Guest: Justine Lord The final dust-up between Duffy and Sharon; Abbott in hospital with a stab wound; Dunstable's flat as a rendezvous . . .
11	"Rough Justice"	Alan Wallis	Tony Bilbow	26 November 1971
Dennis falls into bad company and is introduced to Russian bitter. The result is an appearance in the Magistrate's Court. Bad enough, you may think, but when Duffy, Craven and Mr Smith (one of their old teachers) appear for the defence, things go from bad to worse.
12	"Who Was That Lady?"	Alan Wallis	Geoff Rowley and Andy Baker	3 December 1971
Guests: Cheryl Hall and Jan Francis Duffy is feeling the strain of separation from Sharon but is not above chatting up a bird – especially when her father is in a position to put a bit of business his way.
13	"Kill or Cure"	Alan Wallis	John Esmonde and Bob Larbey	10 December 1971
Maureen is a bundle of nerves as she waits for her "O" level results which will affect her nursing career. What better cure for the nerves than a nice date with a "nice chap"? So Duffy and Craven, with the best will in the world, pick the "nice chap". But where there is a will there is not always a way.
14	"When Did You Last See Your Father?"	Alan Wallis	David Barry	24 December 1971
Until now, Frankie Abbott's mother has kept the awful secret of his father private. But Frankie is growing up – even if he is 10 years late about it – and his questions finally reveal the skeleton in mum's cupboard.
15	"A Fair Swap"	Bryan Izzard	Geoff Rowley and Andy Baker	31 December 1971
Guest: Nicholas Grace The happiest day of a girl's life is her wedding day – that is unless she's being married from the Duffy household! The whole affair of the wedding of Duffy's cousin, Deborah, however, is somewhat complicated by Maureen's kidnapping, and the assistance of Frankie "nurse" Abbott.
16	"The Clean Weekend"	Alan Wallis	John Esmonde and Bob Larbey	7 January 1972
Guest: Bob Todd Eric and Sharon get back together and the gang have a day out at the seaside. When they decide to stay the night in a hotel, Eric and Sharon get themselves into all kinds of trouble.
17	"Tally Ho"	Bryan Izzard	Geoff Rowley and Andy Baker	14 January 1972
With a bit of help from Craven, Dennis Dunstable tries to make his abusive alcoholic dad turn over a new leaf.
18	"Horse of the Year"	Alan Wallis	John Esmonde and Bob Larbey	Friday 21 January 1972
Guest: James Beck Dennis has to decide how to spend his birthday money, and spends it on a horse at an auction.
19	"From Sudbury with Love"	Mark Stuart	Geoff Rowley and Andy Baker	28 January 1972
Guest: Lynda Bellingham Frankie Abbott hits town looking for a new girlfriend.
20	"Who's Minding the Shop?"	Alan Wallis	John Esmonde and Bob Larbey	4 February 1972
A road accident means that the Fenn Street Gang become shop-keepers.
21	"The Great Frock Robbers"	Bryan Izzard	John Esmonde and Bob Larbey	11 February 1972
Sharon's job at the boutique is in jeopardy when she is blamed for not spotting a gang of shop-lifters. It seems things can't get any worse, and then Frankie gets the job of store detective . . .

=== Series 2 ===
Series 2 and 3 were broadcast on Sunday's at 7:25pm

No.	Title	Directed by	Written by	Original release date
1	"The Crunch"	David Askey	John Esmonde and Bob Larbey	15 October 1972
Duffy discovers that running a small family business is not all beer and skittles. He can't even afford the beer!
2	"Smart Lad Wanted"	David Askey	John Esmonde and Bob Larbey	22 October 1972
Bowler, the local villain who "runs everything except London Transport", offers the out-of-work Craven a job. Craven's friends warn him about getting mixed up with Bowler, but he has never been one to listen to advice that didn't suit him.
3	"The Woman for Dennis"	David Askey	John Esmonde and Bob Larbey	29 October 1972
The gang are delighted when the lonely Dennis Dunstable announces he has found a girlfriend. Then they meet the "girl" – battle-scarred and pushing 40. Sadly, it appears that Cupid may need a little correction . . .
4	"Menagerie a Trois"	Philip Casson	John Esmonde and Bob Larbey	5 November 1972
Abbott's hypochondriac mother throws off her bandages when she falls for a man. Abbott's jealousy drives him from home, and he decides to inflict himself on Dennis. But Abbott and his mother deserve each other too much for the parting to be permanent.
5	"That Sort of Girl"	Mark Stuart	John Esmonde and Bob Larbey	12 November 1972
Struggling to stay in business, Duffy needs, but cannot afford, some new ladders. Sharon enters a beauty contest to try to get enough money to buy them, but Duffy has strong views on beauty contests and Maureen has strong views on men who have strong views on beauty contests.
6	"The Left-Hand Path"	David Askey	John Esmonde and Bob Larbey	19 November 1972
Working for the crooked Mr Bowler has brought Craven a flash car and flash clothes. Working for himself has brought Duffy packed lunches and overalls. Craven cannot resist showing off, but showing off with Bowler's money is not only silly, but also very dangerous.
7	"The Lady with the Lamp"	Mark Stuart	John Esmonde and Bob Larbey	26 November 1972
At last Maureen passes her O-levels and begins a new career as a "real" nurse. Little do the patients and the staff realise what they are in for with the arrival of a modern-day Florence Nightingale gone berserk!
8	"The Loneliest Night of the Week"	Mark Stuart	John Esmonde and Bob Larbey	3 December 1972
Dennis and Frankie find contact with the opposite sex difficult. With advice from Craven and Sharon, Dennis feels that dancing lessons might be a way of making friends. Abbott, of course, has a much better idea, an idea that could lead to disaster . . .
9	"Father's Day"	Howard Ross	John Esmonde and Bob Larbey	10 December 1972
Mr. Dunstable has his last drunken row with his wife – who leaves him. So he decides to move in with Dennis. But Dennis, now making sweet, if slow, progress with his girlfriend, has other ideas.
10	"Low Noon"	David Askey	John Esmonde and Bob Larbey	17 December 1972
Mr, Bowler likes Peter Craven working for him because he has "style". He very much wants Duffy on his payroll, too, because he has even more "style". Duffy says no, but Mr Bowler is a determined man who thinks anyone will change their mind – with a little persuasion . . .
11	"And Baby Makes Four"	Philip Casson	John Esmonde and Bob Larbey	31 December 1972
Craven moves away from home and gets himself a flat – which he regards as a potential "come up for coffee and do you have to go home?" set-up. Then he gives a lift to a heavily-pregnant hitch-hiker, and his love-nest begins to look like a nursing home.
12	"Is That a proposal, Eric?"	Howard Ross	John Esmonde and Bob Larbey	7 January 1973
Sharon has been Eric Duffy's girlfriend since the Third Form at fenn Street School, and she is beginning to think that she will only be his girlfriend when they are drawing their pensions. This leads Sharon to take drastic steps. Eric only takes one step – but it's a big one.
13	"Private Eye & Public Nuisance"	Philip Casson	John Esmonde and Bob Larbey	14 January 1973
Frankie Abbott is enjoying life on the dole, spending his days in bed and only waking occasionally to play with his new camera. This his mother meets private investigator Mr Drew and persuades him to re-employ her son.
14	"Dypsomania on Sea"	Howard Ross	John Esmonde and Bob Larbey	21 January 1973
When Dennis is persuaded to take a holiday by the sea, his father goes too and takes the cure. but, much to the horror of elderly residents of a certain hotel, the sea air revives the spirits in both father and son!
15	"Is Anybody There?"	Philip Casson	John Esmonde and Bob Larbey	28 January 1973
The gang go other-worldly when Maureen gets them interested in spiritualism. At a meeting held by Mr Grout, a local medium, he tells them that one of them could easily turn out to be a medium too. Abbott immediately assumes that he has psychic powers, but a surprise is in store for Maureen!
16	"How to Handle a Woman"	Howard Ross	John Esmonde and Bob Larbey	4 February 1973
The relationship between Craven's parents consists of Mrs Craven yelling and Mr Craven obeying. So he decides to incite his father to rebellion, and succeeds – in splitting them up!
17	"Business Deficiency"	Philip Casson	John Esmonde and Bob Larbey	11 February 1973
The writing is on the wall for Eric Duffy. What he needs to get his decorating business more firmly established is to put the whole thing on a more formal footing.
18	"Absent Friends"	Howard Ross	John Esmonde and Bob Larbey	18 February 1973
Duffy and Sharon's engagement is made official at last – so, of course, there has to be a party. What better time than now for the happy couple to have all their old school friends around them? Or is it?

=== Series 3 ===
No.	Title	Directed by	Written by	Original release date
1	"An Englishman's Home"	Philip Casson	John Esmonde and Bob Larbey	27 May 1973
Duffy and Sharon are engaged and looking for a home of their own. They think they've found one but Frankie Abbott loses them the chance to buy it. Full of remorse, Abbott sets out to try to make amends.
2	"Mother Knows Best"	Philip Casson	John Esmonde and Bob Larbey	3 June 1973
Taking a girlfriend home for the first time is always a nerve-racking experience. But when you have a mother like Frankie has, the confrontation is particularly difficult!
3	"Alone At Last"	Mark Stuart	John Esmonde and Bob Larbey	10 June 1973
Wedding bells are finally ringing for Duffy and Sharon and after all the traditional marriage day hang-ups, all they want is to be alone. But fate has yet one more trick in store.
4	"Making Whoopee"	Mark Stuart	John Esmonde and Bob Larbey	17 June 1973
Honeymoons should be unforgettable. Well, Duffy and Sharon will always remember their honeymoon in Mallorca – but not for the usual reasons!
5	"After the Ball"	Mark Stuart	John Esmonde and Bob Larbey	24 June 1973
Craven has been walking the tightrope of life too long, and naturally it is the idiot Abbott who makes him lose his balance. The question is – can Duffy provide the safety net?
6	"The Ant and the Grasshopper"	Philip Casson	John Esmonde and Bob Larbey	1 July 1973
Duffy has taken Craven on as first assistant painter, but their industrial relationship is soon put under strain. Something has to give, and it looks as though the result might be a rise in the unemployment figures.
7	"Abbott of Arabia"	Mark Stuart	John Esmonde and Bob Larbey	8 July 1973
Mrs Abbott exerts her authority over Frankie once too often. It changes him into a latter-day "Red Shadow" and he gallops off with Celeste (his new girlfriend) to the registry office . . .
8	"Full Circle"	Mark Stuart	John Esmonde and Bob Larbey	15 July 1973
Sharon is pregnant. Unfortunately it is somewhat difficult to share with Eric when they are not even talking . . .

== External link ==
- Fen Street Gang (full series)
