= Jam tart =

English tart variety

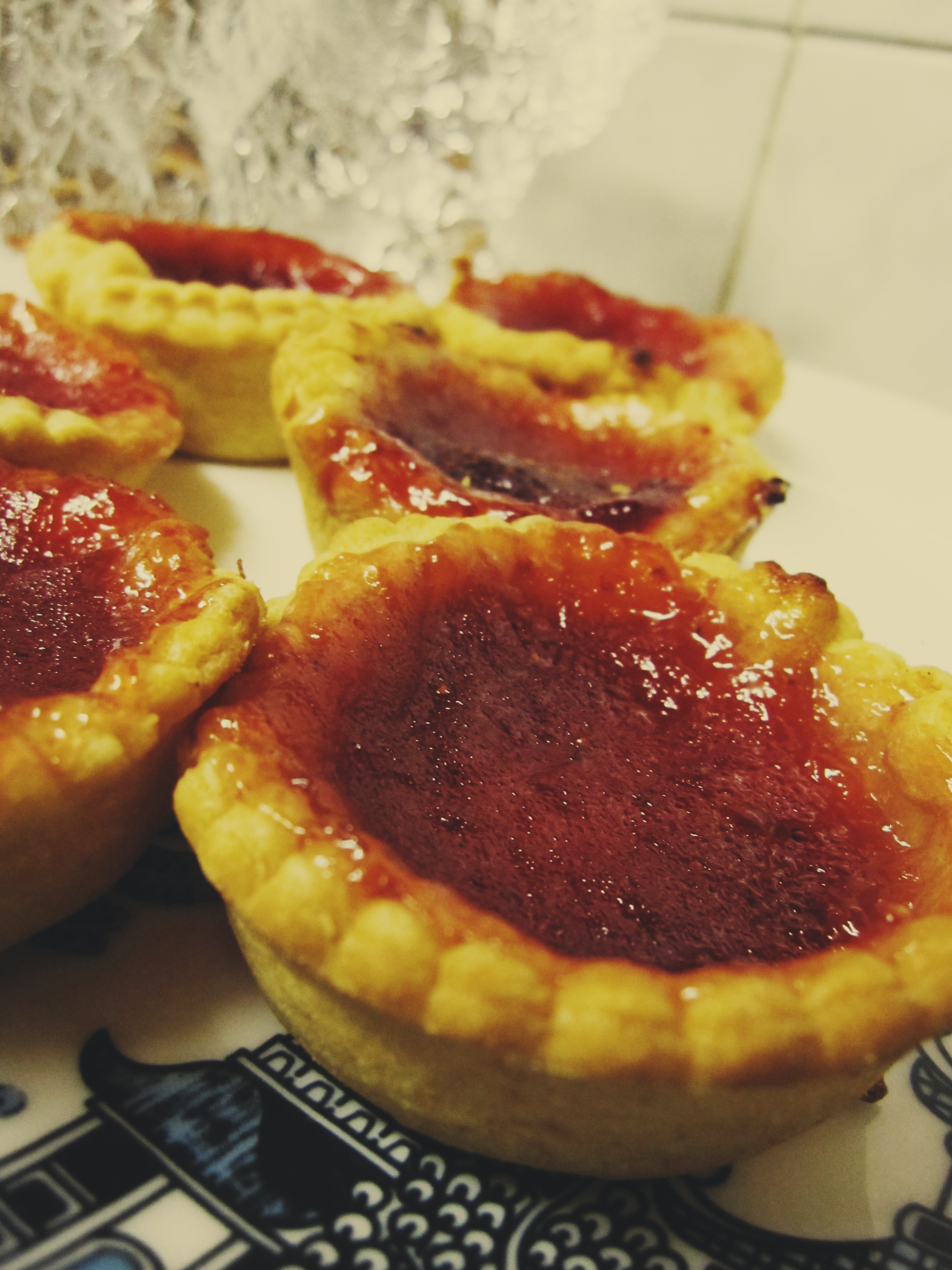
Homemade jam tarts

A jam tart is small and open English tart variety.

== Etymology ==
The term "jam tart" came into common use around the 1840s, but the dish itself predates the term. They comprise small shortcrust pastry bases, filled with a fruit jam, such as strawberry, raspberry, apricot or lemon curd which are then baked. The earliest recorded use of the phrase "jam tart" is from c. 1840.

== History ==
Jam tarts are considered a "quintessential" British food, although possibly they are known to have been consumed in eighth-century Xinjiang, China, and used as a burial offering to the gods. They were unknown to most people in Medieval Europe, however, until the Atlantic sugar trade of the century. This was because until sugar became widely available for common use, the usual medieval sweetener was honey, but, unlike sugar, honey was a limited preservative. The ruling classes could afford sugar imported form the Middle East, and it was used to make what were known as "tartstuff", a rich butter paste patty filled with a fruit filling such as strawberry, mixed with were stewed with sugar, red wine, cinnamon, ginger or rose-water. (Note: Not only strawberry, however; the Tudors particularly utilised a broad range of fillings, including fruits such as prunes, medlars, quinces and rosehip, but also flower petals like cowslip, violets, borage flowers, primroses, rose petals or those from marigolds.) The Romans made pastry, but not jam.

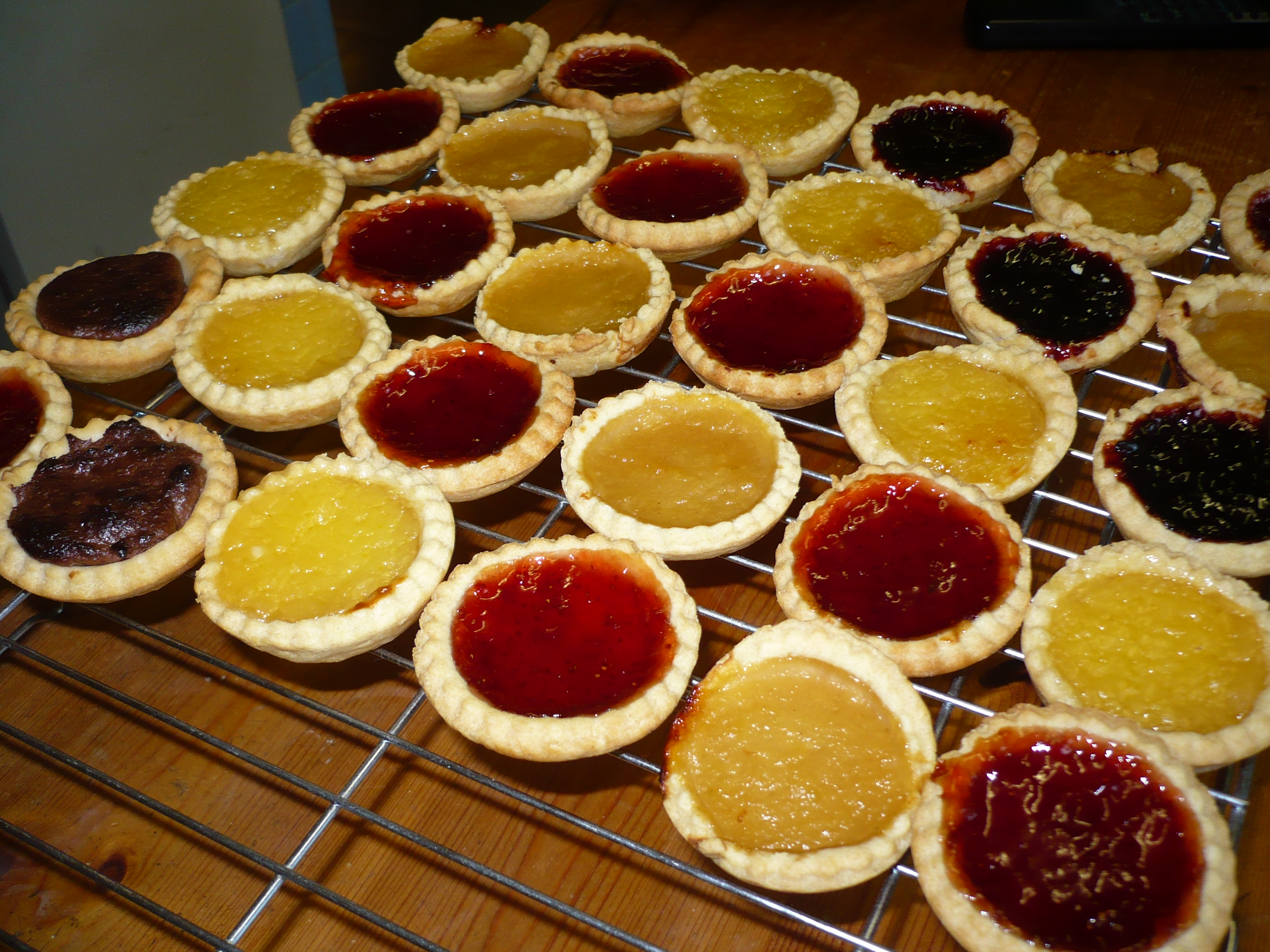
Strawberry and Apricot jam tarts

By the Victorian period jam tarts had become a staple of the domestic menu. Recipes from cooks such as Hannah Glasse popularised baking with jam, as until then sugar was most commonly known as "a medicine, a spice, or a plaything of the powerful".

One variety was known as Epiphany tarts, and traditionally baked for 6 January, to celebrate the arrival of the Three Kings in Bethlehem, and considered a delicacy. It has been described by a modern food critic as "the very pinnacle of understated boasting in the jam tart world". Larger than twentieth-century tarts, it was divided into 13 slices, representing Jesus and his disciples, with each section filled with a different variety of jam. Trying to use as many different flavours as possible added a competitive element. The tart also indicated socio-economic status, both by reflecting the depth of faith in the household and that luxuries were affordable; Mrs Beeton wrote that, even in 1861, jam was a luxury due to its expense, particularly when recipes required "considerable quantities", such as jam tarts. They also could be made throughout the year, often with the addition of mincemeat.

It is probable that it was an erroneously made jam tart that led to the accidental creation of the Bakewell pudding, in Bakewell, Derbyshire. Supposedly one Mrs Greaves left instructions for her inexperienced cook to make a jam tart, but, instead of mixing eggs and almond paste for pastry, she spread it on top of the jam where it formed a crust on baking. (Note: Hover, the Bakewell pudding—often called a tart—has roots in medieval cuisine, where it was a custard cream baked over candied fruit and known as a flanthon.)

== Cultural resonance ==
Jam tarts have entered British culture. In an episode of the television series Midsomer Murders, 'Secrets and Spies', one of the characters refers to Mr Kipling as being not "just a jam tart"; this was an allusion to both the confectionary company who produced the cakes and Rudyard Kipling, who wrote spy novels. In the sitcom Please Sir! (1968–1972) episode, Peter Cleall's character Eric Duffy defended a subnormal fellow pupil played by Peter Denyer—Dennis Dunstable—fellow actor David Barry wrote, Cleall was in possession of a jam tart. According to Barry, Cleall "carried the jam tart over to Richard Everett's character, and said threateningly, 'Did you say something, you pasty-faced pillock?'" before smashing the tart into Everett's face; "Jam trickled all over the shocked actor's face, down his neck and over his school uniform."

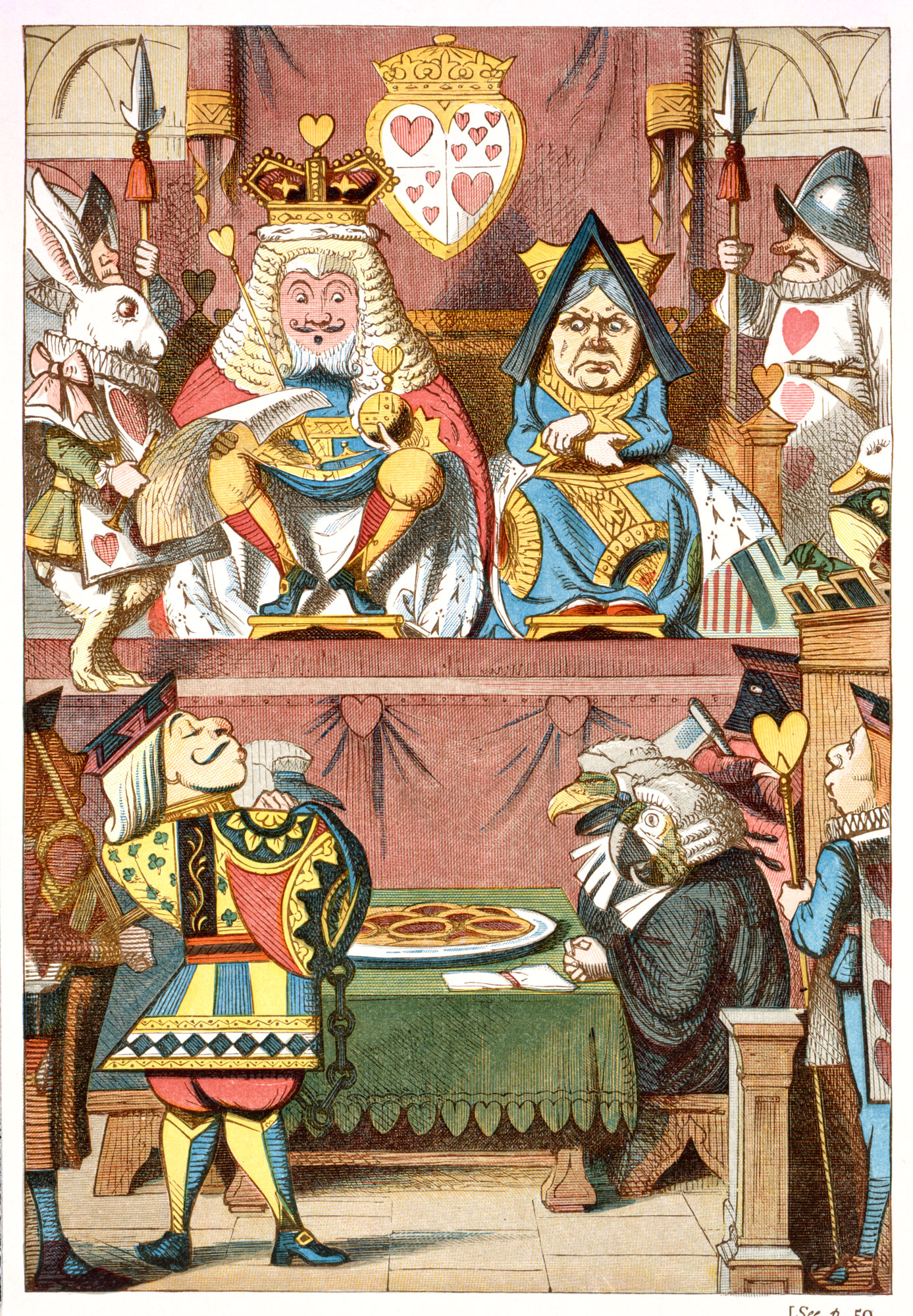
The King and Queen of hearts preside over the Knave's trial; note the Queen's jam tarts laid out as evidence before them.

The pastry is also an essential component of the English nursery rhyme, The Queen of Hearts, in which the eponymous Queen bakes some jam tarts. The King of Hearts wants to dine, only for it to be discovered that the tarts have been stolen. Investigation reveals the Knave of Hearts as the culprit; the King proceeds to "beat the knave full sore". As a result of his beating, the knave promises to desist from his life of crime in future. Lewis Carroll uses the rhyme as plot device in Alice's Adventures in Wonderland to parody the British justice system, using the King of Hearts, the Queen of Hearts and the Knave of Hearts as characters. In 2015, the Welsh town of Llandudno—where Alice Liddell, Carroll's inspiration for Alice——launched an attempt to enter the Guinness Book of Records for the longest line—1500, 2000, or 2045—of jam tarts, which must also then be consumed. This followed a previous attempt by the town three years previously, when participants made and ate 1716 tarts.

W. H. Auden wrote a poem in 1938 titled "I'm a Jam Tart", as a satire on the cabaret songs of Cole Porter. Jam tart has been Cockney rhyming slang for heart since the 19th century, and also referred to a man's "best girl". Its use expanded to include (usually young) women generally, and thus the term of endearment "sweetheart". For example, Barry Humphries stated, in his 1971 book Bazz Pulls it Off! that "whenever I see a decent jam tart with a good set of top bollocks I'm in like Flynn. No probs!", (Note: Julian Franklyn has noted that "it is one of the few examples rhyming slang terms to be reduced to its second element instead of its first".) and in Australian English, for example, "The Pope's a Jew if that jam tart doesn't root like a rattlesnake" as reported in Private Eye in 1969. Another of jam tart's original slang meanings was "mart", as in a market place; this was often applied to the London Stock Exchange. This further led to the combination of the two to mean a girl of loose morals, or even a prostitute. Due to its association with "heart", and the fact that they play in a maroon strip, jam tart also became the nickname for the Scottish football team, Heart of Midlothian.

== See also ==
- Pudding
- High tea
- Pop-Tarts
