= Malcolm McFee =

English actor (1949–2001)

- Born: Malcolm Raymond McFee; 16 August 1949; Forest Gate, Essex, England, UK
- Died: 18 November 2001 (aged 52); Braintree, Essex
- Occupation: Actor
- Years active: 1967–2001
- Children: 3

Malcolm Raymond McFee (16 August 1949 – 18 November 2001) was an English actor best known for his role as Peter Craven in the TV series Please Sir!, the film of the same name, and the spin-off TV series The Fenn Street Gang.

== Career ==
Malcolm McFee was born in Forest Gate and was educated at Plaistow County Grammar School. He started his acting career in repertory theatre, before making his first appearance on television in 1967. In 1968, he began a three-season stint in the London Weekend Television situation comedy series Please Sir! playing the part of smooth wide-boy Peter Craven. He continued the role into the 1971 feature film comedy version, also called Please Sir!. McFee had made his film debut in the 1969 satirical anti-war musical Oh! What a Lovely War.

The Please Sir! TV series spawned a comedy sequel called The Fenn Street Gang, which ran from 1971 to 1973. McFee was unavailable for season one as he was appearing in the West End play Forget-Me-Not-Lane and the part of Craven was played for that season by Leon Vitali. McFee returned for seasons two and three. He appeared on television many times in the 1970s but was only rarely seen after this, until 1993.

After turning to the stage, McFee made a career as an actor and director, working as a theatre director in small theatres in Greater London and the provinces.

His last TV role was in an episode of the long-running Thames Television police drama series The Bill, in 1997.

McFee also appeared as a guest on This is Your Life for John Alderton in 1974, and presented three episodes of BBC pre-school programme You and Me in 1978. He was the reporter and clown in the 1980s BBC schools science programme Science Workshop.

Music journalist Simon Goddard has suggested that McFee is the subject of Morrissey's song "Little Man, What Now?" from his 1988 album Viva Hate, although previous opinions have suggested Jack Wild or Roger Tonge as the subject. The song mentions an ATV series axed after four years, and Morrissey watching it on a Friday night (season 1 of Please Sir! was indeed broadcast on Friday nights although subsequent seasons went out on Saturday or Sunday nights), and tells of the fall of a TV star of the 1960s who later became unknown.

== Television appearances ==
Apart from Please Sir! and The Fenn Street Gang, McFee appeared in the following television programmes:

Years	Programme	Episode
1967	Associated-Rediffusion's drama series Sanctuary	Sisters & Brothers (Season 1, Episode 5)
1968	BBC children's drama series Ramshackle Road	Episode 1 onwards.
1969	Long-running BBC police drama series Z Cars	Sunday... Sunday... Parts 1 and 2 (Season 6, Episodes 231 & 232)
1970	BBC anthology drama series Play For Today	I Can't See My Little Willie, by Douglas Livingstone (Season 1, Play Number 6)
1971	BBC2's historical drama series Elizabeth R	Episode 5, The Enterprise of England
1971	Thames Television's detective anthology series The Rivals of Sherlock Holmes	The Case of Laker, Absconded (Season 1, Episode 13)
1973	Thames Television's situation comedy series Bless This House	A Girl's Worst Friend is Her Father (Season 3, Episode 12)
1976	Yorkshire Television's drama series Hadleigh	Recurring character in Season 4 but episodes not known
1978	Thames Television's crime panel series Whodunnit!	Which Way Did he Go? (Season 6, Episode 10)
1978	ITV family comedy The Chiffy Kids	Jam Session (Season 2, Episode 5)
1978	Euston Films' police drama series for ITV The Sweeney	Messenger of the Gods (Season 4, Episode 1)
1979	BBC Schools programme Everyday Maths	Ten Per Cent Per Ted (Season 2, Episode 1)
1979	BBC children's comedy adventure series Graham's Gang	Mildred's Party (Season 2, Episode 3)
1980	Euston Films' long running comedy/drama series for ITV Minder	Monday Night Fever (Season 1, Episode 9, uncredited)
1993	Thames Television's crime drama series The Bill	The Hard Sell (Season 9, Episode 135)
1996	Alomo Productions' BBC situation comedy series Goodnight Sweetheart	It Ain't Necessarily So (Season 3, Episode 1)
1997	BBC police drama spoof The Detectives	Mine's a Large One (Season 5, Episode 6)
1997	Alomo Productions' BBC situation comedy series Birds of a Feather	Relative Strangers (Season 7, Episode 4)
1997	The Bill (2nd appearance)	Playing with Fire (Season 13, Episode 81, playing a different character to 1993 episode)

== Personal life ==
From 1960 to 1965, McFee attended Plaistow County Grammar School. He was briefly the drummer in a band called The Abstracts with some schoolfriends before devoting himself to acting.

In 1971, he married Margaret Kearnan. They divorced in 1995. McFee had three children, including a daughter, Victoria, born to Margaret in 1980. He had a son, Calum, and step-daughter, Leane, with second wife Jacqui.

In an interview in 1973, McFee said that he owned a Ford Capri and had a cat called Perdita Pusscat.

McFee died suddenly on 18 November 2001, at the age of 52, at his home in Braintree, Essex, shortly before he was due to appear as a dame in a pantomime of Beauty and the Beast at the Elgiva Theatre in Chesham. He had been suffering from cancer. McFee had been raising money for the Oncology Department of Broomfield Hospital in Chelmsford, Essex as a "Thank you" for the treatment he received from them. David Barry and Penny Spencer, who both appeared with McFee in Please Sir!, attended his funeral.

== Filmography ==
Year	Title	Role	Notes
1969	Oh! What a Lovely War	Frederick Percy 'Freddie' Smith	
1971	Please Sir!	Peter Craven	
