= Please Sir! (film) =

1971 British comedy by Mark Stuart

- UK theatrical poster
- Directed by: Mark Stuart
- Written by: John Esmonde; Bob Larbey
- Produced by: Leslie Grade; Andrew Mitchell
- Starring: John Alderton; Deryck Guyler; Noel Howlett; Joan Sanderson
- Cinematography: Wilkie Cooper
- Edited by: Richard Best
- Music by: Mike Vickers
- Production company: L.W.I. Productions
- Distributed by: Rank Organisation
- Release date: 10 September 1971
- Running time: 100 minutes
- Country: United Kingdom
- Language: English

Please Sir! is a 1971 British comedy film directed by Mark Stuart and starring John Alderton, Deryck Guyler and Carol Hawkins. Written by John Esmonde and Bob Larbey, it is a spin-off from the ITV television series Please Sir! (1968–1972). It was released by the Rank Organisation on 10 September 1971.

== Plot ==
Mr Hedges, the somewhat naive and idealistic teacher of the rebellious Class 5C of Fenn Street School lobbies to have his class allowed on the annual school camping trip despite opposition from the head teacher Mr Cromwell, the fastidious and officious school caretaker Mr Potter, snobbish teacher Miss Ewell and the world-weary Mr Price. Eventually (with Mr. Hedges having won the hearts and minds of Mr Cromwell and Miss Ewell with a speech about giving Class 5C a helping hand with the benefits of the trip to the countryside) Class 5C get to go on the trip – providing Mr Hedges comes along to supervise his unruly class.

Once on the camping trip Mr Hedges pursues Penny Wheeler, a local part-time barmaid, and the class indulge in their usual activities: Dennis relishes the clean air and rural surroundings and befriends a gypsy boy named Nobbler; meanwhile 5C engage in a feud with stereotypical upper-class pupils from the posh Boulters School, which is resolved after a false rape allegation from Sharon. A case of stolen money is resolved through Mr Hedges trusting the class. At the final dance Mr Hedges is ensnared in the romantic clutches of teacher Miss Cutforth, contrary to his wishes.

== Cast ==
- John Alderton as Bernard Hedges
- Deryck Guyler as Norman Potter
- Noel Howlett as Maurice Cromwell
- Joan Sanderson as Doris Ewell
- Richard Davies as Mr Price
- Erik Chitty as Mr Smith
- Patsy Rowlands as Angela Cutforth
- Peter Cleall as Eric Duffy
- Carol Hawkins as Sharon Eversleigh
- Liz Gebhardt as Maureen Bullock
- David Barry as Frankie Abbott
- Peter Denyer as Dennis Dunstable
- Malcolm McFee as Peter Craven
- Aziz Resham as Feisal
- Brinsley Forde as Wesley
- Jill Kerman as Penny Wheeler
- Norman Bird as Reynolds
- Barbara Mitchell as Mrs Abbott
- Peter Bayliss as Mr David Dunstable
- Eve Pearce as Mrs Daphne Dunstable
- Jack Smethurst as bus driver
- Brenda Cowling as Mrs Duffy

== Production ==
The film was a co production between London Weekend Television and Leslie Grade. Filming started in May 1971, at Pinewood Studios and on location in London in Primrose Hill and Willesden. The country park scenes were shot at Black Park, close to Pinewood in Buckinghamshire. A number of then/now location shot comparisons are documented at ReelStreets.com.

Writers Larby and Esmonde said they enjoyed the "newfound freedom" writing a movie. "We will be going back in time by writing an overall story of life at Fenn Street," said Esmonde. For instance, the film shows Mr. Hedges meeting Penny Wheeler – characters who were engaged and got married in Season Three of the TV show. The only regular cast member not to appear in the film was Penny Spencer, who played Sharon Eversleigh in the TV show. She was replaced by Carol Hawkins who also played the role in The Fenn Street Gang (1971–1973), the TV spin-off from Please Sir!

== Music ==
The film's closing theme, "La La La Lu", was written by Mike Vickers and performed by Cilla Black. Black and her manager/husband Bobby Willis claimed they had been led to believe the song would open and close the film, but it was instead used over the final scenes of the pupils dancing and then partially over the closing credits. The planned release of the single was consequently abandoned by Black, who instead used the track as the B-side of her 1971 single Something Tells Me (Something's Gonna Happen Tonight), which became her final top 10 single in the UK

== Reception ==
=== Box office ===
The film was one of the most popular movies of 1972 at the British box office.

=== Critical ===
The Monthly Film Bulletin wrote: "The episodes of the three-year-old TV comedy series about a young master's disciplinary problems in a tough, London comprehensive school last for an ample thirty minutes apiece. This film version plays up the original's already embarrassing tendency to use illiteracy, race and imbecility as primary sources of humour, while padding out its material to feature length with some laboured mugging and gross caricature. Recurring and lovingly-held closeups of John Alderton dithering, Deryck Guyler smirking, and Joan Sanderson glaring prove poor substitutes for comic invention, which seems to have been lost somewhere along the school's journey from urban to rural surroundings. And though the series may originally have claimed a degree of authenticity in its depiction of present-day pupil-teacher relationships, it's particularly hard to take these seriously now that most of Hedges' pupils (with the notable exception of Liz Gebhardt) look a good ten years too old for their parts."

Sight and Sound said "no marks for comic invention". Filmink called it "quite fun".

The Manchester Evening News called it "good natured knockabout fun of the kind you can take all the family to see."

The Radio Times Guide to Films gave the film 2/5 stars, writing: "Inspired by the Sidney Poitier feature To Sir with Love (1967), ITV's often hilarious sitcom ran for four years from 1968. The original class of 5C were all ready to depart for their own series, The Fenn Street Gang, when this shambolic film version was made. John Alderton is good as the put-upon form teacher, but the few funny moments belong to Joan Sanderson as the headmaster's formidable assistant."

Leslie Halliwell said: "Grossly inflated, occasionally funny big-screen version of the TV series."
