= Carol Hawkins =

British actress (born 1949)

- Born: Carol Hawkins; 31 January 1949 (age 77); Barnet, Hertfordshire, England
- Occupation: Actress
- Years active: 1969–present
- Spouse: Martyn Padbury (m. 1984; died 2013)

Carol Hawkins (born 31 January 1949) is an English actress, best known for her various comic roles in numerous television sitcoms and films in the 1970s and 1980s.

She played the roles of Sharon Eversleigh in the film of the television series Please Sir! and Sandra in the BBC TV series Porridge, and starred in two Carry On films (Carry On Abroad as Marge and Carry On Behind as Sandra).

== Biography ==
Hawkins trained early on as a shorthand typist at Pitman's College, London, but, following some modelling and promotion work, attended the Corona Stage Academy in Hammersmith, London. While still training as an actress, she won the part of Sharon Eversleigh in the film of the popular television series Please Sir!, replacing the departed Penny Spencer. Hawkins went on to play the part of Sharon in The Fenn Street Gang.

She performed in British comedy films of the 1970s, such as two Carry On films: Carry On Abroad (1972), alongside Sally Geeson, and Carry On Behind (1975), alongside Sherrie Hewson. In 1972, she again appeared alongside Geeson in the film adaptation of the British television comedy, Bless This House.

She appeared in the Carry On Laughing television series, but she declined to appear in the 1976 Carry On England, due to the nudity. (The part written for Hawkins was played instead by Tricia Newby.) Her other film appearances at that time included principal roles in British comedy films Not Now, Comrade and Confessions of a Pop Performer. At the end of 1975, she appeared in the Porridge episode "No Way Out" as a fake doctor assigned to secretly give Fletcher a false passport.

Hawkins "more or less retired" in 2005, with the aim of devoting more time to spiritual matters and animal care.

== Film, television and theatre credits ==
=== Filmography ===
- The Body Stealers (1969) – Paula
- Zeta One (1969) – Zara
- Monique (1970) – Blonde Girl
- When Dinosaurs Ruled the Earth (1970) – Yani
- Up Pompeii (1971) – Nero's Girl (uncredited)
- Please Sir! (1971) – Sharon Eversleigh
- Bless This House (1972) – Kate Baines
- Carry On Abroad (1972) – Marge
- Percy's Progress (1974) – Maggie
- Confessions of a Pop Performer (1975) – Jill Brown
- Carry On Behind (1975) – Sandra
- Not Now, Comrade (1976) – Barbara Wilcox

=== Selected television credits ===
- Carry On Again Christmas (1970) – Island Girl
- On the House (1971) – Elspeth
- The Fenn Street Gang (1971–1973) – Sharon Eversleigh / Sharon Duffy
- The Two Ronnies (1974–1983) – various characters
- Porridge (1975) – Sandra
- Carry On Laughing (1975) – Lily
- Whodunnit? (1976) – Vera Moore
- And Mother Makes Five (1976) – Miss Jennings
- Mr. Big (1977) – Norma
- Robin's Nest (1978) – Policewoman Doris Dobbs
- Whodunnit? (1978) – Penny Cooper
- The Les Dawson Show (1979)
- Blake's 7 (1980) – Kerril
- The Dick Emery Show (1980)
- Together (1980–81)
- C.A.T.S. Eyes (1985) – Sandra Fox
- My Husband and I (1986–1988) – Tracy Cosgrove
- All at No 20 (second series, 1987) – Candy
- The Bill (1991–1999) – Lynn Archer / Mrs. Rose / Mrs. Sterry / Mrs. Nash / Mrs. Giles
- Rides (1993) – Charmian
- Trial & Retribution (1998) – Monica Fuller
- Doctors (2004) – Pam Jordan

=== Selected theatre credits ===
- Wait Until Dark (1975)
- Sextet (1977–78, Criterion Theatre)
- Time and Time Again (1978)
- Bedroom Farce (1979)
- The Undertaking (1980, Fortune Theatre)
- Dirty Linen (1980, Arts Theatre, London)
- Run for Your Wife (1983, Shaftesbury Theatre; 1989, Whitehall Theatre)
- See How They Run (1984, Shaftesbury Theatre)
- Wife Begins at Forty (1985, Ambassadors Theatre)
