= Carry On Laughing =

1975 British TV comedy series

- Genre: Comedy
- Directed by: Alan Tarrant
- Starring: Kenneth Connor; Jack Douglas; Joan Sims; Peter Butterworth; Barbara Windsor; David Lodge; Sid James; Ronnie Brody; Diane Langton; Hattie Jacques; Patsy Rowlands; Bernard Bresslaw; Sherrie Hewson
- Composers: John Marshall and Ritchie Tattersall
- Country of origin: United Kingdom
- Original language: English
- No. of series: 2
- No. of episodes: 13

Production
- Executive producer: Peter Rogers
- Producer: Gerald Thomas
- Running time: 24–26 minutes
- Production company: Associated Television

Original release
- Network: ITV
- Release: 4 January – 7 December 1975

Carry On Laughing is a British television comedy series produced in 1975 for ATV. Based on the Carry On films, it was an attempt to address the films' declining cinema attendance by transferring the franchise to television. Many of the original cast members were featured in the series.

Carry On Laughing ran for two series, the first for six half-hour episodes and the second for seven episodes. The episode Orgy and Bess featured the final Carry On performances of both Sid James and Hattie Jacques.

The TV series is not as widely known as the original films, which – by contrast – are broadcast regularly on British television.

== Cast ==
=== Carry On cast ===
- Kenneth Connor (12 episodes)
- Jack Douglas (12 episodes)
- Joan Sims (11 episodes)
- Peter Butterworth (9 episodes)
- Bernard Bresslaw (5 episodes)
- Sid James (4 episodes)

Additionally, Hattie Jacques and Patsy Rowlands both appeared in only one episode each in the first series.

=== Other cast ===
- David Lodge (7 episodes)
- Norman Chappell (7 episodes)
- Brian Osborne (7 episodes)
- John Carlin (6 episodes)
- Sherrie Hewson (4 episodes)
- Billy Cornelius (3 episodes)
- Victor Maddern (3 episodes)
- Diane Langton (3 episodes)
- Vivienne Johnson (3 episodes)

Other notable cast members include Carol Hawkins, Ronnie Brody, Oscar James, Brian Capron, MacDonald Hobley, Michael Nightingale and Marianne Stone.

== Production ==
The series was conceived after the departures of two long-serving Carry On contributors: writer Talbot Rothwell and actor Charles Hawtrey. Furthermore, Kenneth Williams declined to appear in the series. Other Carry On regulars only appeared in a minority of episodes: Sid James in only the first four, Hattie Jacques and Patsy Rowlands in only one each, and Bernard Bresslaw appeared only in the second series.

In the absence of Rothwell, other writers were brought in. Lew Schwarz and experienced Carry On writer Dave Freeman each wrote six, while Barry Cryer and Dick Vosburgh penned Orgy and Bess.

Each episode parodied a famous TV series, film or book. Three episodes feature a character based on Lord Peter Wimsey – Lord Peter Flimsy. Another two episodes are nods to Upstairs, Downstairs, with the character of Hudson the butler parodied as Clodson, and the cook Mrs. Bridges as Mrs. Breeches.

The series provided an opportunity for David Lodge – little more than a bit-part player in some of the later Carry On films – to play leading characters.

== Notes ==
ATV had already helped to bring the Carry Ons to the small screen in 1973, when it broadcast What A Carry On, a one-off show hosted by Shaw Taylor featuring clips from the stage play Carry On London and interviews with its stars – Sid James, Barbara Windsor, Kenneth Connor, Peter Butterworth, Bernard Bresslaw and Jack Douglas. It is believed that this footage is missing from the archives.

During the 1980s, a different Carry On Laughing series was produced for Thames. This was a clip-based compilation from the Carry On films and had no other connection to the 1975 TV series. At the same time, What A Carry On was also the title of a BBC series of classic clips from the films.

== Episodes ==
=== Series 1 ===
No. overall	No. in series	Title	Directed by	Written by	Original release date
1	1	"The Prisoner of Spenda"	Alan Tarrant	Dave Freeman	4 January 1975
Starring Sid James, Barbara Windsor, Peter Butterworth, Joan Sims, Kenneth Connor, Jack Douglas, David Lodge and Ronnie Brody Parody of The Prisoner of Zenda
2	2	"The Baron Outlook"	Alan Tarrant	Dave Freeman	11 January 1975
Starring Sid James, Joan Sims, Barbara Windsor, Kenneth Connor, Peter Butterworth, Diane Langton, and David Lodge
3	3	"The Sobbing Cavalier"	Alan Tarrant	Dave Freeman	18 January 1975
Starring Sid James, Jack Douglas, Barbara Windsor, Joan Sims, Peter Butterworth, David Lodge and Bernard Holley Parody of The English Civil War
4	4	"Orgy and Bess"	Alan Tarrant	Barry Cryer and Dick Vosburgh	25 January 1975
Starring Sid James, Kenneth Connor, Barbara Windsor, Hattie Jacques, and Jack Douglas Parody of Sir Francis Drake and the Spanish Armada
5	5	"One in the Eye for Harold"	Alan Tarrant	Lew Schwarz	1 February 1975
Starring Jack Douglas, Kenneth Connor, Joan Sims, Diane Langton, David Lodge, Norman Chappell, Patsy Smart, Jerold Wells and Billy Cornelius
6	6	"The Nine Old Cobblers"	Alan Tarrant	Dave Freeman	8 February 1975
Lord Peter Flimsy (Jack Douglas) and his butler Punter (Kenneth Connor) are summoned by Ameila Forbush (Joan Sims) to the village of Sincreek to solve a murder when a dead body is found on stage during Miss Dawkins's (Patsy Rowlands) solo at an amateur village hall concert. The first of three appearances of Flimsy (a parody of Lord Peter Wimsey), this episode also stars Barbara Windsor and David Lodge.

=== Series 2 ===
No. overall	No. in series	Title	Directed by	Written by	Original release date
7	1	"Under the Round Table"	Alan Tarrant	Lew Schwarz	26 October 1975
Starring Kenneth Connor, Joan Sims, Peter Butterworth, Bernard Bresslaw, Jack Douglas, Oscar James, Victor Maddern, Norman Chappell, Ronnie Brody, Brian Capron, Desmond McNamara and Billy Cornelius Parody of King Arthur
8	2	"The Case of the Screaming Winkles"	Alan Tarrant	Dave Freeman	2 November 1975
Starring Jack Douglas, Kenneth Connor, Joan Sims, Peter Butterworth, David Lodge and Melvyn Hayes
9	3	"And in My Lady's Chamber"	Alan Tarrant	Lew Schwarz	9 November 1975
Starring Kenneth Connor, Joan Sims, Peter Butterworth, Bernard Bresslaw, Jack Douglas, Sherrie Hewson, Andrew Ray and Carol Hawkins Parody of Upstairs, Downstairs
10	4	"Short Knight, Long Daze"	Alan Tarrant	Lew Schwarz	16 November 1975
Starring Kenneth Connor, Barbara Windsor, Joan Sims, Peter Butterworth, Bernard Bresslaw, Jack Douglas, Norman Chappell, Brian Capron, Susan Skipper and Desmond McNamara.
11	5	"The Case of the Coughing Parrot"	Alan Tarrant	Dave Freeman	23 November 1975
Starring Jack Douglas, Kenneth Connor, Joan Sims, David Lodge, Sherrie Hewson, Peter Butterworth, Norman Chappell and Johnny Briggs
12	6	"Who Needs Kitchener?"	Alan Tarrant	Lew Schwarz	30 November 1975
Starring Kenneth Connor, Barbara Windsor, Jack Douglas, Joan Sims, Bernard Bresslaw, Andrew Ray, Sherrie Hewson and Carol Hawkins Parody of the First World War
13	7	"Lamp Posts of the Empire"	Alan Tarrant	Lew Schwarz	7 December 1975
Starring Barbara Windsor, Kenneth Connor, Jack Douglas, Bernard Bresslaw, Peter Butterworth, Oscar James, Norman Chappell, and Michael Nightingale

== Related use of the title ==
The title Carry On Laughing was also used for:

- a Carry On stage play performed in Scarborough in 1976 and featuring series regulars Jack Douglas, Kenneth Connor, Peter Butterworth and Liz Fraser.
- a series of television programmes shown by Thames Television from 1981 to 1984, featuring classic clips from the Carry On film series, although footage was also drawn from other British comedy films of the era, such as the movie spin-offs of On the Buses and Steptoe and Son. In 1983, a Christmas special of this series was made, entitled Carry On Laughing's Christmas Classics, featuring classic film clips, linked by newly filmed material with Kenneth Williams and Barbara Windsor.

== DVD releases ==
The entire series was released as DVD bonus features spread over various UK releases of Carry On films.

A complete 13-episode collection was released in a 2-Disc DVD box set on 25 May 2004 by A&E Home Video, under licence from Carlton International Media Limited (Region 1 format, US and Canada).

Prior to this DVD release, all 13 episodes from both series were released in a set of four VHS video cassettes issued by ITC (Incorporated Television Company Limited) in 1992.

== Bibliography ==
- Davidson, Andy (2012). Carry On Confidential. London: Miwk. ISBN 978-1-908630-01-8.
- Sheridan, Simon (2011). Keeping the British End Up - Four Decades of Saucy Cinema. London: Titan Books. ISBN 978-0-85768-279-6.
- Webber, Richard (2009). 50 Years of Carry On. London: Arrow. ISBN 978-0-09-949007-4.
- Hudis, Norman (2008). No Laughing Matter. London: Apex. ISBN 978-1-906358-15-0.
- Keeping the British End Up: Four Decades of Saucy Cinema by Simon Sheridan (third edition) (2007) (Reynolds & Hearn Books)
- Ross, Robert (2002). The Carry On Companion. London: Batsford. ISBN 978-0-7134-8771-8.
- Bright, Morris; Ross, Robert (2000). Mr Carry On – The Life & Work of Peter Rogers. London: BBC Books. ISBN 978-0-563-55183-6.
- Rigelsford, Adrian (1996). Carry On Laughing - a celebration. London: Virgin. ISBN 1-85227-554-5.
- Hibbin, Sally & Nina (1988). What a Carry On. London: Hamlyn. ISBN 978-0-600-55819-4.
- Eastaugh, Kenneth (1978). The Carry On Book. London: David & Charles. ISBN 978-0-7153-7403-0.
