= Liz Gebhardt =

English actress (1945–1996)

- Born: Elisabeth Anne Gebhardt; 12 April 1945; Liverpool, England
- Died: 10 August 1996 (aged 51); London, England
- Education: Guildhall School of Music and Drama
- Occupation: Actress
- Years active: 1966–1994
- Spouse: Ian Talbot

Elisabeth Anne Gebhardt (12 April 1945 – 10 August 1996) was an English actress, best known for playing the part of form 5C pupil Maureen Bullock in the LWT sitcom Please Sir! (1968–71) and in the subsequent spin-off show, The Fenn Street Gang (1971–73).

Following on from her role in the show and its spin-off, she continued working in television, starring as Doreen Bissel in Dear Mother...Love Albert, and appearing in a number of supporting roles in programmes such as New Scotland Yard, Z-Cars, The Naked Civil Servant, Doctor on the Go, Grange Hill, The Bill, Love Hurts, Keeping Up Appearances and others. Her few film roles included the movie version of Please Sir! (1971), and a brief appearance as a maid in Julius Caesar (1970).

She worked extensively in radio at the BBC, appearing in 54 radio broadcasts during the period 1967 to 1984, mostly drama productions, including for the BBC World Service drama department and for Radio 3. Often these were one-off plays, including for Radio 4's prestigious Saturday Night Theatre series. She worked repeatedly for World Service drama (in productions including the 1977 thriller serial The Toff on the Farm), but those credits are not included here due to a lack of sources: World Service productions in this period were not reported in BBC's Radio Times magazine. She also made repeated appearances for Radio 2 on the popular 1970s radio soap opera Waggoners' Walk in 1974. In comedy, she was a regular in the 1971 sitcom Life Is What Yer Make It for Radio 4, starring Michael Robbins and Pat Coombs, and in their 1973 sequel The Things, altogether appearing with them in 19 episodes. At the BBC her extensive radio work eventually led to her breaking into television, to which she switched entirely after 1984.

In her earlier years, Liz attended Willesden County Grammar School in North-West London.

== Death ==
Gebhardt was diagnosed with cancer and admitted to hospital in summer 1996; she died in August, aged 51. During her cancer treatment, she sustained injuries from radiotherapy, a situation which contributed to the formation of a campaign to prevent damage from such treatment.

Gebhardt married in 1968 fellow actor and former director of the Regent's Park Open Air Theatre, Ian Talbot.

== Filmography ==
Year	Title	Role	Notes
1966	The Rat Catchers	Receptionist	TV series (1 episode: "Operation Lost Souls")
1966	Blackmail	Meg	TV series (1 episode: "I Love Ivor Divor – Why the Devil Doesn't He Love Me?")
1967	Emergency – Ward 10	Liz Tyler	TV series (1 episode: "A Family Likeness")
1967	Send Foster	Liz Ellis	TV series (1 episode: "The Accident")
1967 – 1968	Half Hour Story	Mother/Dilys	TV series (2 episodes)
1968	ITV Playhouse	Carole	TV series (1 episode: "The Bonegrinder")
1968	Knock Three Times	Cissie	TV series (2 episodes)
1968 – 1974	Z Cars	Gwen Morgan/Linda Blackshaw	TV series (3 episodes)
1968 – 1971	Please Sir!	Maureen Bullock	36 episodes
1969	All Star Comedy Carnival	Maureen Bullock	TV movie
1970	Julius Caesar	Calpurnia's Maid (uncredited)	Film
1970	Frost on Sunday	Maureen Bullock	TV series (1 episode: "Frost at the London Palladium...")
1971	Please Sir!	Maureen Bullock	Film
1971	Dear Mother...Love Albert	Doreen Bissel	TV series (6 episodes)
1971 – 1973	The Fenn Street Gang	Maureen Bullock	27 episodes
1972	New Scotland Yard	Christine Beaumont	TV series (1 episode: "Ask No Questions"")
1972	All Star Comedy Carnival	Maureen Bullock	TV movie
1974	Football Crazy	Carol	TV short
1974	Funny Ha-Ha	Carol	TV series (1 episode: "Football Crazy")
1975	The Naked Civil Servant	Art Student	TV movie
1976	Shades of Greene	Miss Garfitt	TV series (1 episode: "The Case for the Defence")
1976	Hunter's Walk	Josie Dale	TV series (1 episode: "Missing")
1977	Doctor on the Go	Jane	TV series (1 episode: "The War of the Wards")
1984	Don't Wait Up	Mrs Davies	TV series (1 episode: "Episode #2.3")
1984	Dramarama	Mrs. Banks	TV Series (1 episode: "Dodger, Bonzo and the Rest'")
1985	Bulman	Fiona Lamont	TV series (1 episode: "A Cup for the Winner")
1985 – 1986	Troubles and Strife	Annette	TV series (13 episodes)
1987	Grange Hill	Mrs Edelman	TV series (3 episodes)
1988	Dramarama	Mum	TV series (1 Episode: "Now You See Them")
1989	Brookside	Mrs. Twist	TV Series (1 episode)
1989 – 1993	The Bill	Mrs. Martin/Mrs. Cook/Car Driver/Mrs. Booth	TV series (4 episodes)
1990	Keeping Up Appearances	Angry Woman	TV series (1 episode: "Stately Home")
1994	Love Hurts	Frances Kelly	TV series (1 episode: "Happy Families")
