= Noel Howlett =

English actor (1901–1984)

- Born: 22 December 1901; Bexley, Kent, England
- Died: 26 October 1984 (aged 82); Hammersmith, London, England
- Occupation: Actor
- Years active: 1936–1984

Noel Howlett (22 December 1901 – 26 October 1984) was an English actor, principally remembered as the incompetent headmaster, Morris Cromwell, in the ITV 1970s cult television programme Please Sir! He was the subject of infatuation by Deputy Head Doris Ewell, played by Joan Sanderson.

== Career ==
Howlett made his stage debut at Folkestone in 1925 in The Second Mrs Tanqueray. At Northampton Repertory Theatre in 1930 he played Sherlock Holmes. He also appeared as Mr Williams in the 1948 film The Winslow Boy, starring Robert Donat. At Stratford-on-Avon in 1953, he played Old Gobbo (father to Donald Pleasence's Launcelot Gobbo) in The Merchant of Venice, Edward IV (brother to Marius Goring's Richard III), Baptista in The Taming of the Shrew and Gloucester in King Lear.

An early TV role was portraying a vicar in the 1958/59 BBC series Quatermass and the Pit. He appeared as Professor Rushton in a one-off 1967 edition ("Mission Highly Improbable") of The Avengers and as the Reverend Simon Blanding in a one-off 1967 edition ("Dead Man's Shoes") of Man in a Suitcase. Other screen appearances include the 1960s TV shows Softly, Softly and Danger Man. He also appeared in one 1976 episode ("I Talk to the Trees") of the BBC situation comedy The Good Life as slightly eccentric allotment gardener Mr Wakeley.

He also frequently broadcast and did a spell for the BBC as a member of their Drama Repertory Company (now the Radio Drama Company), one of his appearances being as Inspector Walter Neider in the 1965 Paul Temple radio episode, "Paul Temple and the Geneva Mystery".

== Personal life and death ==
Howlett was born in Bexley, Kent. He studied theology at Leeds University and Mirfield Theological College. Howlett had planned to become a parson, but was encouraged to learn acting as good training for his days in the pulpit. He spent two years as a schoolmaster before taking up acting full time. He never married and had no children. He died on 26 October 1984 aged 82 after a long period of ill health.

== Selected filmography ==
- Men Are Not Gods (1936) – Cashier (uncredited)
- A Yank at Oxford (1938) – Tom Craddock
- The Proud Valley (1940) – Company Clerk (uncredited)
- George and Margaret (1940) – Malcolm
- Jassy (1947) – Court Usher (uncredited)
- The White Unicorn (1947) – Sir Humphrey Webster (uncredited)
- When the Bough Breaks (1947) – Judge
- The Mark of Cain (1947) – Judge (uncredited)
- This Was a Woman (1948) – Chief Surgeon Barclay
- Corridor of Mirrors (1948) – Psychiatrist (uncredited)
- The Calendar (1948) – Lawyer
- Good-Time Girl (1948) – Clerk
- The Winslow Boy (1948) – Mr. Williams (uncredited)
- Saraband for Dead Lovers (1948) – Count Platen
- The Blind Goddess (1948) – Court Usher
- Scott of the Antarctic (1948) – First Questioner
- Once Upon a Dream (1949) – Solicitor
- The Perfect Woman (1949) – Scientist
- Your Witness (1950) – Martin Foxglove K.C. – Sam's Barrister
- The Reluctant Widow (1950)
- Laughter in Paradise (1951) – Clerk of the Court
- Cloudburst (1951) – Johnson
- Scrooge (1951) – First Collector
- Father Brown (1954) – Auctioneer
- One Good Turn (1955) – Jeweller
- Handcuffs, London (1955) – Jeremiah Rugeley
- Lust for Life (1956) – Commissioner Van Den Berghe
- Nowhere to Go (1958) – Uncle Tom Howard (uncredited)
- Serious Charge (1959) – Mr. Peters
- The Scapegoat (1959) – Dr. Aloin
- The Battle of the Sexes (1960) – Mr. White
- Mary Had a Little... (1961) – Pottle
- Victim (1961) – Patterson
- Lawrence of Arabia (1962) – Vicar at St. Paul's (uncredited)
- Tomorrow at Ten (1962) – Brain Specialist
- Murder at the Gallop (1963) – Mr. Trundell
- Kiss of the Vampire (1963) – Father Xavier
- Woman of Straw (1964) – Assistant Solicitor
- The Amorous Adventures of Moll Flanders (1965) – Bishop
- Quatermass and the Pit (1967) – Abbey Librarian
- The Bushbaby (1969) – Rev. Barlow
- Some Will, Some Won't (1970) – Endicott
- Please Sir! (1971) – Mr. Cromwell
- Mr. Selkie (1979) – Grandpa Ross
- John Wycliffe: The Morning Star (1984) – Archbishop Sudbury
