= Dear Mother...Love Albert =

British TV sitcom (1969–1972)

- Created by: Rodney Bewes; Derrick Goodwin
- Starring: Rodney Bewes; Garfield Morgan; Sheila White; Geraldine Newman; Liz Gebhardt; Amelia Bayntun; Cheryl Hall
- Country of origin: United Kingdom
- Original language: English
- No. of series: 4
- No. of episodes: 26 (+ 3 short specials)

Production
- Running time: 30 minutes
- Production companies: Thames Television (series 1); Yorkshire Television (series 2–4)

Original release
- Network: ITV
- Release: 15 September 1969 – 6 June 1972

Dear Mother...Love Albert (later retitled Albert!) is a British television sitcom that aired on ITV from 15 September 1969 to 6 June 1972. It was created by and starred Rodney Bewes. Bewes co-wrote and produced the series with Derrick Goodwin. The show regularly appeared in the TV ratings top ten throughout its three-year run.

The theme song was sung by Bewes, co-written by Mike Hugg. Hugg had also encouraged Bewes to sing the theme to The Likely Lads, but Bewes recalls "I think I drank a bottle of port in the end, but I couldn't get it".

There were 26 episodes, including three Christmas specials, all three broadcast as part of All Star Comedy Carnival. The fourth and final series was broadcast as a sequel entitled Albert!, which ran for a further series of seven episodes. Series 1 was produced by Thames Television, while the subsequent series 2-4 were produced by Yorkshire Television.

== Plot ==
Albert Courtnay (Rodney Bewes) leaves his home in the North of England to live in London. At the start of each episode, he writes home to his mother, grossly exaggerating the events that have happened to him, while the episode goes on to show exactly the opposite. For example, Albert may say in his letter that he has been promoted at work — but the episode shows him being fired.

Albert finds work in a confectionery company, moves into a flat he shares with two young ladies and becomes engaged to Doreen Bissel (Liz Gebhardt). During the fourth and final series, Albert loses both his job and Doreen (now played by Cheryl Hall), but he continues his struggle to survive in London.

The name of Garfield Morgan's character, A.C. Strain, was an in-joke that would have been understood only by those who lived or worked in the same part of Fulham, south-west London, as Rodney Bewes at the time the series was made and broadcast. Bewes took the name from a local newsagent in New Kings Road.

== Regular cast ==
- Rodney Bewes as Albert Courtnay
- Garfield Morgan as A.C. Strain
- Sheila White as Vivian McKewan (series 1-2)
- Geraldine Newman as Mrs McKewan (series 1-2)
- Liz Gebhardt as Doreen Bissel (series 3)
- Cheryl Hall as Doreen Bissel (series 4)
- Mary Land as Frankie (series 3)
- Luan Peters as Lesley (series 3)
- Amelia Bayntun as Ada Bissel (series 3-4)

== Episode guide ==
=== Series 1 (1969) ===
- The Interview (missing)
- Merely A Formality (missing)
- In the Field (missing)
- Knight of the Road (missing)
- The Good Samaritan (missing)
- A Commercial Break (missing)

All Star Comedy Carnival Christmas special, broadcast 25 December 1969 (missing, see Wiping)

=== Series 2 (1970) ===
- Love Is A Many Splendoured Thing
- All The World's A Stage
- Hearts And Flowers
- The Deligate
- I'm Going To Be A Father
- Major Ab Adversis
- All Mod Cons

All Star Comedy Carnival Christmas special, broadcast 25 December 1970 (missing)

=== Series 3 (1971) ===
- A Ring On Her Finger
- The Compulsive Gambler
- Raquel
- De Profundis
- Hold Up, It's A Hand Up
- Lost Weekend

All Star Comedy Carnival Christmas special, broadcast 25 December 1971 (missing)

Note: All six episodes were broadcast in monochrome due to the ITV Colour Strike of 1970-71

=== Series 4 (1972) ===
- Hair!
- A Ghost Story
- Trouble At T'Mill
- Blood Brothers
- Hot-Pot
- If He'd Meant Us To Fly
- Brave New World

== DVD release ==
A 3-disc set containing series 2-4 made by Yorkshire Television and broadcast 1970-72 was released by Network on 14 June 2010. The third series (1971) is in black and white. The DVD notes state that no colour version of this series ever existed; the series was recorded in black and white because of the ITV Colour Strike.
