= Richard Davies (Welsh actor) =

Welsh actor (1926–2015)

- Born: Dennis Wilfred Davies; 25 January 1926; Dowlais, Glamorgan, Wales
- Died: 8 October 2015 (aged 89); Conford, Hampshire, England
- Occupation: Actor
- Spouses: Beryl Armstrong (m. 1944, divorced) Jill Britton (m. 1955)
- Children: 3

Dennis Wilfred Davies, known professionally as Richard Davies (25 January 1926 – 8 October 2015), was a Welsh actor. He was probably best known for his performance as the exasperated schoolmaster Mr Price in the popular LWT situation comedy Please Sir!. He used a broad Welsh accent for much of his work, but had used other accents to play a wide range of characters, in addition to several Welsh stereotypes.

== Biography ==
Davies was born in Dowlais, near Merthyr Tydfil, Glamorgan, the son of a railway guard. He played Idris Hopkins in Coronation Street between 1974 and 1975, and appeared in several science-fiction series, among them Robert's Robots, Out of the Unknown, and a well-received performance as Burton in the 1987 Doctor Who story Delta and the Bannermen. He played Mr. White in the Fawlty Towers episode "The Kipper and the Corpse" and also appeared in Yes Minister, Wyatt's Watchdogs, May to December, Whoops Apocalypse, 2point4 Children and One Foot in the Grave. In 1970, he appeared in an episode of Two in Clover as Victor Spinetti's character's brother when Spinetti was unavailable. His other main role was in the comedy series Oh No It's Selwyn Froggitt where he played Clive.

Davies had a recurring role as Jim Sloan in Z-Cars between 1962 and 1965, returning to the series playing different characters in 1968 and in its spin-off Softly, Softly. He also appeared in Dixon of Dock Green, The Sweeney and Van der Valk. He impersonated Clive Jenkins in a spoof edition of Question Time in a sketch on Not the Nine O'Clock News. He appeared in the Please Sir! spin-off series The Fenn Street Gang. In 1951, he made an uncredited appearance in the Ealing Studios comedy The Lavender Hill Mob. He had appeared in films such as Zulu (1964), the film adaptation of Please Sir! (1971), and Under Milk Wood (1971). In 1988, he played the schoolteacher in Queen Sacrifice. He died on 8 October 2015 at the age of 89, survived by his wife and two children, and a son from his first marriage after a battle against Alzheimer's disease.

== Filmography ==
=== Film ===
Year	Title	Roles	Notes
1949	A Run for Your Money	Rugby Fan	Uncredited
1951	The Lavender Hill Mob	Police Driver	Uncredited
1955	The Night My Number Came Up	Wireless Operator	
1956	The Long Arm	Detective	Uncredited
1961	A Fever in the Blood	Bates	Uncredited
1962	Some People	Harper	
1963	Critic's Choice	Spectator	Uncredited
1964	Zulu	Private 593 Jones	
1966	Sky West and Crooked	Rick	
1968	Twisted Nerve	'Taffy' Evans	
1968	The Fiction Makers	Reporter	
1969	Oh! What a Lovely War	Sergeant in Burial Party	Uncredited
1971	Please Sir!	Mr Price	
1971	Under Milk Wood	Mr Pritchard	
1973	Steptoe and Son Ride Again	Butcher	
1974	The Mutations	Doctor	
1974	Blue Blood	Jones	
1988	Queen Sacrifice	Wil Bevan	Short

=== Television ===
Year	Title	Role	Notes
1960	The Secret Kingdom	Rigby	
1962–1965	Z-Cars	Jim Sloan	
1968	Softly, Softly		
1968–1972	Please Sir!	Mr Price	
1970	Two in Clover	David Evans	
1974–1975	Coronation Street	Idris Hopkins	
1974–1977	Oh No It's Selwyn Froggitt	Clive Meredith	21 episodes
1975	The Sweeney	Doctor	S1E2 Jackpot
1977	Van der Valk	Sgt Lloyd	S3E8 Dead on Arrival
1979	Fawlty Towers	Mr White	
1980	Yes Minister	Joe Morgan	
1982	Whoops Apocalypse	Chancellor of the Exchequer	
1983	Give Us a Break	Taffy	
1984	Bottle Boys	Stan Evans	
1985	Big Deal	Dai Phillips	
1986	That Uncertain Feeling	Mr Davis	
1987	Doctor Who	Burton	Serial: Delta and the Bannermen
1988	Wyatt's Watchdogs		
1989	EastEnders	Ted	
1992	One Foot in the Grave	Billy Whitney	
1992–1993	2point4 Children	Gareth	
1993	The Bill	Caretaker	
1996	And the Beat Goes On	Father Hopkins	
1998	2point4 Children	Jack	
