= Tunes (confectionery) =

Brand of throat lozenge

- Product type: Throat lozenge
- Current owner: Mars, Inc.
- Produced by: Wrigley Company
- Country: United Kingdom
- Introduced: 1987
- Discontinued: 2017; 9 years ago
- Previous owners: Rowntree Mackintosh

Tunes was a brand of throat lozenge manufactured by Wrigley Company in the United Kingdom. It was marketed as a cough sweet, or anti-congestant lozenge, containing eucalyptus oil and menthol. It was a relative of the also discontinued brand of Spangles, and shares the same packaging and dimensions of that brand.

In the United Kingdom, Tunes no longer have the style packaging of Spangles.

Mars Wrigley Confectionery discontinued the Tunes brand in 2017, the last available flavour of the product was Cherry Menthol, in a sugar free format. No new Tunes products have been made since then.

There was a memorable television advertising campaign for the product with the slogan "Tunes help you breathe more easily". The commercials featured the actor Peter Cleall, who would perfectly enunciate the word "Tunes" after taking the anti-congestant.
