= The Fenn Street Gang =

British TV sitcom (1971–1973)

- Credits
- Created by: John Esmonde; Bob Larbey
- Starring: Peter Cleall; Carol Hawkins; David Barry; Peter Denyer; Liz Gebhardt; Malcolm McFee; Leon Vitali
- Country of origin: United Kingdom
- Original language: English
- No. of series: 3
- No. of episodes: 47 (list of episodes)

Production
- Running time: 30 minutes
- Production company: London Weekend

Original release
- Network: ITV
- Release: 17 September 1971 – 15 July 1973

The Fenn Street Gang is a British television sitcom which ran for three series between 17 September 1971 and 15 July 1973. Created by John Esmonde and Bob Larbey, it was a spin-off from their popular Please Sir! series.

== Synopsis ==
The series follows the lives of many of the pupils from Fenn Street School as they enter the world of work. Some episodes were written by Geoff Rowley and Andy Baker, as well as David Barry and Tony Bilbow. The series' stars were Peter Cleall, Carol Hawkins (who also replaced Penny Spencer as Sharon in the 1971 Please Sir! film), David Barry, Peter Denyer and Liz Gebhardt.

Leon Vitali replaced Malcolm McFee as Peter Craven during the first series, although McFee took this role back for the second and third series'. Peter Denyer (Dennis Dunstable) and Liz Gebhardt (Maureen Bullock) were absent from the third (and final) series. John Alderton (Mr Hedges, their form-master in Please Sir!) guest-appeared in three episodes of the first series of The Fenn Street Gang and the first two episodes from the final series of Please Sir!, which ran alongside The Fenn Street Gang in transmission dates. Richard Davies, who played science teacher Mr Price in Please Sir!, also appeared again as Mr Price in one episode of series one.

The series ran for two years and 47 episodes.

== Production ==
The first series, consisting of twenty-one episodes, was produced by London Weekend Television at Wembley Studios in north-west London. Series two and three, consisting of eighteen and eight episodes respectively, were recorded at LWT's newly constructed South Bank Television Centre (also known as Kent House).

== Sequel ==
Bowler (1973) was a 13-episode spin-off series following The Fenn Street Gang crime boss Stanley Bowler, played by George Baker.

== DVD releases ==
All three series of The Fenn Street Gang have been released on DVD.

DVD	Release date
The Complete Series 1	29 October 2007
The Complete Series 2	5 May 2008
The Complete Series 3	21 July 2008
The Complete Series 1 – 3	12 March 2018
