= Your Witness (film) =

1950 British film by Robert Montgomery

- British theatrical poster
- Directed by: Robert Montgomery
- Written by: Hugo Butler; Ian McLellan Hunter
- Produced by: Joan Harrison
- Starring: Robert Montgomery; Leslie Banks; Felix Aylmer; Andrew Cruickshank
- Cinematography: Gerald Gibbs
- Edited by: Lito Carruthers
- Music by: Malcolm Arnold
- Production company: Coronado Productions
- Distributed by: Warner Brothers (U.K.)
- Release date: 6 March 1950 (U.K.)
- Running time: 100 minutes
- Country: United Kingdom
- Language: English
- Budget: £108,600 or $1 million
- Box office: £90,000

Your Witness (U.S title Eye Witness) is a 1950 British drama film directed by and starring Robert Montgomery, Leslie Banks, Felix Aylmer and Andrew Cruickshank. It was written by Hugo Butler and Ian McLellan Hunter.

== Plot ==
A leading American lawyer travels to a village in England to help an old friend from the Second World War who is facing a charge of murder.

== Cast ==
- Robert Montgomery as Adam Heyward
- Leslie Banks as Colonel Summerfield
- Felix Aylmer as The Judge
- Andrew Cruickshank as Sir Adrian Horth KC
- Patricia Cutts as Alex Summerfield (credited as Patricia Wayne)
- Harcourt Williams as Richard Beamish
- Jenny Laird as Mary Baxter
- Michael Ripper as Samuel 'Sam' Baxter
- Ann Stephens as Catherine Ann 'Sandy' Summerfield
- Wylie Watson as Mr Widgery, Red Lion Proprietor
- Noel Howlett as Martin Foxglove KC, Sam's Barrister
- James Hayter as Prouty
- John Sharp as Police Constable Hawkins
- Shelagh Fraser as Ellen Foster
- Dandy Nichols as waitress
- Stanley Baker as Sergeant Bannoch
- Erik Chitty as Clerk of the Court
- Amy Dalby as Mrs Widgely
- Wensley Pithey as Alfred
- Hal Osmond as taxi driver

== Production ==
The film was shot at Teddington Studios. It was the first film from Coronado Productions.

== Critical reception ==
In The New York Times, Bosley Crowther wrote, "Robert Montgomery's 'Eye Witness,' which came to the Little Carnegie on Saturday, is an amiable combination of British and American cinema crafts, run up for pleasant diversion if not exceptional note".

Monthly Film Bulletin said "The film ... does not ask to be taken seriously as detection, preferring tiresome and self-conscious commentary on the English scene. In a distressingly picturesque village twenty miles from London the inhabitants talk straight Cockney, broad Yorkshire, and stage Somerset: other details strike equally false. Montgomery wanders among these strange creatures with a justifiable look of pop-eyed horror, and, as he has directed the picture inordinately slowly for such a trifle, it seems that he is for ever walking aimlessly from side to side of the screen. Apart from some exhausting character playing, the film is chiefly remarkable for the embarrassing ineptitude of its leading lady, Patricia Wayne, who faces the camera as if she would much prefer a firing squad."

TV Guide rated the film two out of five stars, calling it a "Routine crime melodrama with another of the American heroes British audiences seem to like."

Leslie Halliwell said: "Interesting but ineffective blend of comedy and courtroom procedure intended to contrast English and American ways."

In British Sound Films: The Studio Years 1928–1959 David Quinlan rated the film as "average", writing: "Sometimes suspenseful and well directed, but long and rather slow thriller."
