= Bowler (TV series) =

1973 British TV sitcom

- Genre: Crime comedy Sitcom
- Created by: John Esmonde; Bob Larbey
- Written by: John Esmonde; Bob Larbey
- Directed by: Mike Mansfield
- Starring: George Baker; Fred Beauman; Renny Lister
- Country of origin: United Kingdom
- Original language: English
- No. of series: 1
- No. of episodes: 13

Production
- Producers: Philip Casson; Derrick Goodwin

Original release
- Network: LWT; ITV
- Release: 29 July – 21 October 1973

Related
- The Fenn Street Gang

Bowler is a British television sitcom which originally aired on ITV in a single series of 13 episodes between 29 July and 21 October 1973. A situation-comedy, it was a spin-off from The Fenn Street Gang featuring George Baker as East End criminal Stanley Bowler.

Released after serving a prison sentence, Stanley Bowler sets about trying to 'better' himself. The basic premise of the series revolves around Bowler's attempts to develop (and to project to others) a more-cultured personality, as he tries (but fails) to understand the fine arts, and to move into higher social circles.

== Main cast ==
- George Baker as Stanley Bowler
- Fred Beauman as Reg
- Renny Lister as Doreen Bowler
- Gretchen Franklin as Mum
- Christopher Benjamin as Supt. Chamberlain
- Johnnie Wade as Nigel
