= Cheryl Hall =

English actress (1950–2026)

- Born: Cheryl Georgette Hall; 23 July 1950; Whitechapel, London, England
- Died: 9 August 2026 (aged 76)
- Education: Corona Theatre School
- Occupation: Actress
- Years active: 1968–2011
- Political party: Labour
- Spouses: Robert Lindsay (m. 1974; div. 1980) Robert Potter (m. 1985; div. 1989)
- Partner: Robin Askwith (1970–1973)
- Children: 2

Cheryl Georgette Hall (23 July 1950 – 9 August 2026) was an English actress. She was best known for playing Shirley Johnson in the British sitcom Citizen Smith (1977–1979) and had a recurring role as Sadie in The Bill (1984–1988).

== Early life and education ==
Hall was born in Whitechapel, East London on 23 July 1950, to mother Lilian (née Coles), a civil servant, and father George, a woodworker and trader, and grew up in Bethnal Green. She attended Coborn School for Girls. Hall trained at the Corona Theatre School.

== Career ==
One of her first television appearances was in 1971 when she played Eileen, a clippie, in the On the Buses episode "The Epidemic".

Hall also appeared in Dear Mother...Love Albert playing Rodney Bewes' screen girlfriend. She appeared in the Doctor Who story Carnival of Monsters (1973) as Shirna. Two years previously, Hall had been in the final shortlist of three actresses for the part of the Doctor's companion Jo Grant, alongside eventual winner Katy Manning and Gabrielle Drake, with Jenny McCracken fourth in the list. Producer Barry Letts remembered Hall and McCracken and cast them both in Carnival of Monsters, which Letts also directed.

She played Linda, Sid Abbott's secretary in Bless This House starring Sid James. Hall appeared in an episode of Sykes (1972) and also played an inmate in one episode of Within These Walls (1974) and was David Jason's love interest in the ITV sitcom Lucky Feller (1976). She was girlfriend of her then real-life husband Robert Lindsay in the show Citizen Smith (1977). She also had a small role in EastEnders. Her film appearances included the Avarice segment of The Magnificent Seven Deadly Sins (1971), the farce comedy No Sex Please, We're British (1973) and the all-star pop comedy Three for All (1975).

In the 1980s, Hall had a recurring role as Sadie in the police drama series The Bill and had a guest role in EastEnders. She maintained a steady television career into the 2000s, and appeared in a 2011 documentary recounting her time appearing in Doctor Who.

Hall was the Labour Party parliamentary candidate for Canterbury at the 1997 general election. She also served as a member of Kent County Council, holding the position of Leader of the Labour group for a period.

== Personal life and death ==
Hall was in a relationship with actor and singer Robin Askwith from 1970 to 1973. From 1974 to 1980, she was married to her Citizen Smith co-star Robert Lindsay. From 1985 to 1989, she was married to Robert Potter, with whom she had two sons.

Hall died on 9 August 2026, aged 76.

== Selected filmography ==
=== Film ===
Year	Title	Role	Notes
1970	Deep End	Red Hat Girl	
1971	Villain	Judy	
1971	To Catch a Spy	Clarke's Girlfriend	uncredited
1971	The Magnificent Seven Deadly Sins	Vanessa	segment "Avarice"
1972	Rentadick	Maxine	
1973	The Love Ban	Pregnant Girl	
1973	The 14	Reena	
1973	No Sex Please, We're British	Daphne Martin	
1974	Who Killed Lamb?	Amy	Television film
1975	Three for All	Pet	

=== Television ===
Year	Title	Role	Notes
1968–1971	You and the World	Rene	6 episodes
1969	Scene	Marge	Episode: "Two-Way Traffic"
1969	Special Branch	Blonde Girl	Episode: "Exit a Diplomat"
1970	Smith	Miss Fanny	5 episodes
1970	Armchair Theatre	Julie	Episode: "A Room in Town"
1970	Comedy Playhouse	Audrey	Episode: "Mind Your Own Business"
1971	Sykes and a Big, Big Show	Various	Episode: "Britain's First Moon Shot"
1971	Armchair Theatre	Waitress	Episode: "Brown Skin Gal, Stay Home and Mind Bay-Bee"
1971	On the Buses	Eileen	Episode: "The Epidemic"
1971	The Rivals of Sherlock Holmes	Millie	Episode: "The Affairs of the Tortoise"
1971	The Fenn Street Gang	Brenda Grey	Episode: "Who Was That Lady?"
1972	Callan	Gladys	Episode: "The Richmond File: Do You Recognise the Woman?"
1972	Albert!	Doreen Bissel	3 episodes
1972	Villains	Shirley Coombs	Episode: "His Dad Named Him After the General"
1972	Kate	Brenda	Episode: "People Depend on You"
1972	Sykes	Deirdre	Episode: "Stranger"
1972	Public Eye	Beryl Taylor	Episode: "Mrs. Podmore's Cat"
1972	Love Story	Dilys	Episode: "Once Upon A Time..."
1973	Doctor Who	Shirna	Serial: Carnival of Monsters
1973	Z-Cars	Maureen Price	Episode: "Care"
1973	Love Story	Pam	Episode: "A Great Big Crack in Heaven"
1973	Black and Blue	Carol	Episode: "Soap Opera in Stockwell"
1973	Oranges and Lemons	Brenda	Episode: "Brenda"
1973	Love Story	Terri	Episode: "The String-Tying Machine"
1974	Crown Court	Doreen Tring	Episode: "The Dogs" (3 parts)
1974	Bless This House	Linda	2 episodes
1974	Within These Walls	Magda Selby	Episode: "The Group"
1974	Bedtime Stories	Linda	Episode: "The Water Maiden"
1975	The Sweeney	Jenny	Episode: "Contact Breaker"
1975	Crown Court	Jane Barnes	Episode: "The Also Ran" (3 parts)
1975	Comedy Playhouse	Avril	Episode: "Captive Audience"
1975	Whodunnit?	Jenny	Episode: "Pop Goes the Weasel"
1975	Ten from the Twenties	Peach Grey	Episode: "Her Wedding Morn"
1975	Angels	Clare Truman	Episode: "On the Mat"
1975	Rooms	Sandra	Episode: "Nellie" (2 parts)
1976	Lucky Feller	Kathleen Peake	13 episodes
1976	Dixon of Dock Green	Rita Batty	Episode: "Everybody's Business"
1976	Softly, Softly: Task Force	Minerva Myers	Episode: "The Trojan Horse"
1977	Survivors	Mavis	2 episodes
1977	Rooms	Shirley Tomlin	7 episodes
1977	Get Some In!	Melody	Episode: "Cards"
1977–1979	Citizen Smith	Shirley Johnson	15 episodes
1979	Danger UXB	Jean	Episode: "Digging Out"
1979	A Moment in Time	Doll	2 episodes
1981	Tales of the Unexpected	Irene Rankin	Episode: "Never Speak Ill of the Dead"
1981	The Gentle Touch	Bonus	Episode: "Knife"
1982	In Loving Memory	Vera Venables	Episode: "The Actress and the Undertaker"
1984	Dramarama	Mrs. Jackson	Episode: "Dodger, Bonzo and the Rest"
1984–1988	The Bill	Sadie	13 episodes
1985	Dodger, Bonzo and the Rest	Mrs. Jackson	6 episodes
1988	EastEnders	Christine	8 episodes
1988	A Gentleman's Club	Mrs. Jeavons	Episode: "The Actor"
1989	Poirot	Molly	Episode: "Four and Twenty Blackbirds"
1991	The Chief	Nancy Bonner	Episode: #2.5
1991	The Men's Room	Mavis McDonald	All 5 episodes
1992	As Time Goes By	Waitress	2 episodes
1992	London's Burning	Jan Smith	Episode #3.5
1992	Inspector Morse	Laura	Episode: "Absolute Conviction"
1992	The Bill	Mrs. Harvey	Episode: "Hands Up"
1993	The Bill	Mrs. Mackintosh	Episode: "Consequences"
1994	Grange Hill	Mrs. Catesby	Episode #17.2
1994	Woof!	Mrs. Tully	Episode: "Get Me to the Church"
1995	Casualty	Jane Turner	Episode: "Stiching the Surface"
1995	The Last Englishman	Barmaid	TV film
1995	Wycliffe	Mrs. Ling	Episode: "Four and Twenty Black Birds"
1996	The Bill	Jean Briggs	Episode: "Second Sense"
1997	The Bill	Patty Hudson	Episode: "Just Looking"
1998	The Bill	Janice Richards	Episode: "A People Person"
1998	Bramwell	Vonnie	2 episodes
1999–2000	Silent Witness	Sheryl Marsh	3 episodes
2001	Rehab	Adam's Mum	TV film
2002	Waking the Dead	Valerie Truelove	Episode: "Deathwatch - Part 2"
2003	William and Mary	Alison	Episode #1.1
2007	The Bill	Pauline Smith	Episode: "Killer on the Run"
