= Erik Chitty =

English actor (1907–1977)

- Born: 8 July 1907; Dover, Kent, England
- Died: 22 July 1977 (aged 70); Brent, Middlesex, England
- Education: RADA
- Occupation: Actor
- Years active: 1937–1977
- Spouse: Hester Bevan
- Children: 3

Erik Chitty (8 July 1907 – 22 July 1977) was an English stage, film and television actor.

== Early life ==
Chitty was the son of a flour miller, Frederick Walter Chitty and his wife Ethel Elsie Assistance née Franklin; they married in 1902. He attended Dover College and Jesus College, Cambridge, where he was one of the founders of the Cambridge University Mummers, before training at RADA and becoming a professional actor. He then ran his own repertory company in Frinton-on-Sea.

== Personal life ==
Chitty and former actress Hester Bevan married in 1936, and they had two daughters and one son. He was also a keen genealogist.

== Television career ==
=== Early television (1936–1939) ===
Chitty was an early player in the fledgling BBC television output, which started in November 1936 until it was closed at the beginning of World War II.

- Pyramus And Thisbe, 23 July 1937, Snout
- Rosencrantz and Guildenstern, 2 March 1938, Guildenstern
- Henry IV 22 March 1938, "Valet"
- The White Chateau, 11 November 1938, (Note: Armistice Day, 20th anniversary) Trooper of Uhlans/Orderly/Linesman
- Edna's Fruit Hat, 27 January 1939, Cousin Sid
- The Tempest, 5 February 1939, Boatswain
- The Unquiet Spirit, 7 March 1939 "Hall Porter"
- Katharine and Petruchio, 12 April 1939, "A Tailor"
- Annajanska, The Bolsjevik Empress 2 May 1939, "Stammfest"
- The Day is Gone, 4 August 1939, Radio announcer's voice
- The Advantages of Paternity 12 May 1939, "Brunov"

=== Television postwar (1946 onwards) ===
His television credits included a major role as the aged "Mr Smith" in Please Sir!, and multiple appearances in Dad's Army, Raffles, Doctor Who, Danger Man, Maigret, Man About the House and The Goodies. He appeared in the TV musical Pickwick for the BBC in 1969.

== Filmography ==
- Contraband (1940) – Cloakroom attendant (uncredited)
- Oliver Twist (1948) – Workhouse Board member (uncredited)
- Forbidden (1949) – Schofield
- All Over the Town (1949) – Frobisher
- Your Witness (1950) – Judge's clerk
- Chance of a Lifetime (1950) – Silas Pike
- Circle of Danger (1951) - Box-office clerk (uncredited)
- John Wesley (1954) – Trustee of Georgia
- Time Is My Enemy (1954) – Ballistics expert
- Views on Trial (1954) – Sterling Silver
- Raising a Riot (1955) – Mr Buttons (uncredited)
- Footsteps in the Fog (1955) – Hedges
- Windfall (1955) – (uncredited)
- After the Ball (1957) – Waiter
- Zoo Baby (1957) – Vulture man
- Left Right and Centre (1959) – Deputy returning officer
- The Devil's Disciple (1959) – Uncle Titus
- The Day They Robbed the Bank of England (1960) – Gudgeon (uncredited)
- Not a Hope in Hell (1960) – Joe
- Raising the Wind (1961) – Elderly Man at concert
- Follow That Man (1961) – Doctor
- First Men in the Moon (1964) – Gibbs, Cavor's hired man (uncredited)
- The Horror of It All (1964) – Grandpa Marley
- Doctor Zhivago (1965) – Old Soldier
- Casino Royale (1967) – Sir James Bond's butler (uncredited)
- Bedazzled (1967) – Seed – Sir Stanley Moon's butler (uncredited)
- Anne of the Thousand Days (1969) – Priest (uncredited)
- Arthur? Arthur! (1969) – Uncle Ratty
- A Nice Girl Like Me (1969) – Vicar
- Twinky (1969) – Lawyer's elderly client
- Song of Norway (1970) – Helsted
- The Railway Children (1970) – Photographer
- Lust for a Vampire (1971) – Professor Herz
- The Statue (1971) – Mouser
- Please Sir! (1971) – Mr Smith
- The Amazing Mr. Blunden (1972) – Mr Claverton
- The Vault of Horror (1973) – Old waiter (segment 1 "Midnight Mess")
- Op de Hollandse toer (1973) – Mr Molenaar
- The Flying Sorcerer (1973) – Sir Roger
- Fall of Eagles (1974) - Hertling, German Chancellor
- One of Our Dinosaurs Is Missing (1975) – Museum guard
- The Bawdy Adventures of Tom Jones (1976) – Sam (uncredited)
- The Seven-Per-Cent Solution (1976) – The butler
- Jabberwocky (1977) – Second door-opener / Servant (uncredited)
- A Bridge Too Far (1977) – Organist
