= Derrick Goodwin =

English director, writer, and producer (1935–2021)

- Born: Derrick John Goodwin; 6 July 1935; London, England
- Died: 26 December 2021 (aged 86); Stratford-upon-Avon, Warwickshire, England
- Education: Royal College of Music
- Occupations: Theatre and television director, writer, producer
- Spouse: Nell Curran (m. 1980)

Derrick John Goodwin (6 July 1935 – 26 December 2021) was an English theatre and television director, writer and producer.

== Biography ==
=== Early life ===
Goodwin was born in London and educated at St Mary's School, Hendon (now St Mary's and St John's Church of England School) and the Royal College of Music. He had a BA in music (Hons) and undertook national service in the Royal Air Force.

=== Career ===
Goodwin began his career in stage management. He was an assistant director at the Royal Court Theatre. Goodwin founded The Living Theatre Company with Ken Loach, Jill Gascoine and Brian Grellis, converting an old school in Leicester into a 200-seat open stage theatre. After two years, the building was needed for a new road scheme. A new theatre was built for their use by the city council, but the company never moved into it. Goodwin directed over a hundred theatre productions including plays by Harold Pinter, Samuel Beckett, John Osborne, Anton Chekhov and several of his own plays, including four plays for children.

Goodwin returned to the Royal Court to assist David William in the production of Luigi Pirandello's Naked and then was invited to become assistant director at the Open Air Theatre Regent's Park. He was then appointed Artistic Director of the Dundee Repertory Theatre. After two years at Dundee he was invited by David William to become his Associate Director at the Citizens Theatre, Glasgow, mainly being responsible for the new Close Theatre Club, which was also run by the Citizens' theatre board. He was then appointed Artistic Director of the Ipswich Arts Theatre. John Neville was about to become Artistic Director of the new Nottingham Playhouse, he also wanted to re-open the Newcastle Playhouse and asked Goodwin to become its director. When John Neville decided to leave the Nottingham Playhouse, Goodwin also resigned and joined the BBC television drama department, where he directed episodes of Thirty-Minute Theatre and Z-Cars. He then became a freelancer and with Rodney Bewes co-wrote and directed several series of Dear Mother...Love Albert. He directed the tour of My Fat Friend for Michael Codron Ltd and the tour of Relatively Speaking for the Oxford Playhouse.

In television, Goodwin was involved in producing and directing many series of both drama and situation comedy. In drama, his directing credits included New Scotland Yard, Within These Walls and the Doctor Who serial The Invisible Enemy. In comedy, he co-wrote, with Sid Green, the series Mixed Blessings, which he also produced and directed. He directed and produced Thick as Thieves, written by Dick Clement and Ian La Frenais, starring John Thaw and Bob Hoskins. He was then invited by the Canadian Broadcasting Company to set up a new drama and entertainment department in Winnipeg. Whilst in Canada, he wrote and directed two half-hour films. He returned to England and directed many productions for the BBC, London Weekend Television, Thames Television and Yorkshire Television. He was commissioned by Alan Ayckbourn to write a play, Abiding Passions, which was directed by Ayckbourn at the Stephen Joseph Theatre, Scarborough. It was later re-cast and directed by Goodwin at the Palace Theatre, Watford. It also had a production at the Riverside Studios, Hammersmith, directed by Claire Nielson. Goodwin's last television series was for Alamo Productions and the BBC, Taking the Floor. He later concentrated on writing for theatre and TV and also teaching theatre, television and film.

Goodwin won many awards for theatre and television productions and was a Fellow of the Royal Society of Arts. He wrote a novel, I Got You Babe, which is available as a free e-book.
