= Please Sir! =

British TV sitcom (ITV, 1968–1972)

- Series 3 opening title card, 1970
- Genre: Sitcom
- Starring: John Alderton; Deryck Guyler; Noel Howlett; Joan Sanderson; Richard Davies; Erik Chitty; David Barry; Peter Cleall; Peter Denyer; Liz Gebhardt; Malcolm McFee; Penny Spencer; Carol Hawkins; Richard Warwick
- Theme music composer: Sam Fonteyn
- Opening theme: "School's Out"
- Country of origin: United Kingdom
- Original language: English
- No. of series: 4
- No. of episodes: 55

Production
- Running time: 25-45 minutes
- Production company: London Weekend Television

Original release
- Network: ITV
- Release: 8 November 1968 – 12 February 1972

Related
- The Fenn Street Gang

Please Sir! is a British television sitcom created by John Esmonde and Bob Larbey and featuring actors John Alderton, Deryck Guyler, Penny Spencer, Joan Sanderson, Noel Howlett, Erik Chitty and Richard Davies. Produced by London Weekend Television for ITV, the series ran for 55 episodes between 1968 and 1972.

The theme tune "School's Out" was by Sam Fonteyn.

Exterior location scenes in the TV series were filmed at Stonebridge Primary School.

The title derives from the then-standard request phrase used in Britain when pupils wish to interrupt a male teacher with a question. ("Please Miss!" when addressing a female teacher.) The series was provisionally titled Rough House before being revised to Please Sir! during rehearsals.

Although the series is based around a class of 16-year-old pupils, most of the actors in these roles were in their twenties.

== Synopsis ==
The programme was set in the fictional Fenn Street Secondary Modern School and starred John Alderton as Bernard Hedges, a young teacher fresh out of training college. The supporting cast included Deryck Guyler, Joan Sanderson and Richard Davies. Character actors and actresses formed the guest cast, including Mollie Sugden as a parent of one of the pupils, Barbara Mitchell as Frankie Abbott's mother, and Ann Lancaster as Mrs Pearce in a pair of 1968 episodes.

There were three basic locations for the scenarios: Hedges' classroom, the staffroom and the playground/outer area.

The class nickname for Hedges is "Privet" deriving from privet hedges.

Bernard Hedges and the 5C pupils were replaced by a new teacher and pupils for the final series in 1971–1972, while the original pupils continued in a spin-off series, The Fenn Street Gang, which ran for 47 episodes between 1971 and 1973. This was followed by Bowler (1973), following crime boss Stanley Bowler, played by George Baker for 13 episodes.

As with many situation comedies of this era, a film version was developed, released in 1971. This was set in an outdoor pursuit centre, but starred most of the TV cast.

== Cast ==
=== Staff ===
- John Alderton as Mr Bernard Hedges (1968–1971) (36 episodes)
- Deryck Guyler as Mr Norman Potter, the caretaker (55 episodes)
- Noel Howlett as Mr Cromwell, the headmaster (55 episodes)
- Joan Sanderson as Miss Doris Ewell, the senior mistress (55 episodes)
- Richard Davies as Mr Price, the chemistry teacher (55 episodes)
- Erik Chitty as Mr Smith (55 episodes)
- Bernard Holley as Mr Hurst (1971–1972) (8 episodes)
- Vivienne Martin as Miss Petting (1971–1972) (8 episodes)
- Richard Warwick as Mr David Ffitchett-Brown (1971) (7 episodes)
- Lindsay Campbell as Mr Sibley (1970–1972) (5 episodes)
- Glynn Edwards as Mr Dix (1971) (2 episodes)
- Arnold Peters as School Governor (1970–1972) (3 episodes)
- Geoffrey Hughes as odd job man (series 2)

=== Pupils ===
==== 1968–1971 ====
- Liz Gebhardt as Maureen Bullock (37 episodes)
- Peter Cleall as Eric Duffy (36 episodes)
- David Barry as Frankie Abbott (35 episodes)
- Peter Denyer as Dennis Dunstable (35 episodes)
- Penny Spencer as Sharon Eversleigh (1968–1970) (34 episodes)
- Carol Hawkins as Sharon Eversleigh (1971) (1 episode), Hawkins also played the role in the 1971 film spin-off and the sequel series The Fenn Street Gang.
- Malcolm McFee as Peter Craven (1968–1970) (34 episodes)
- Leon Vitali as Peter Craven (1971) (1 episode)
- George Georghiou pupil 1968 - 1971 (20 episodes)

==== 1971–1972 ====
- Charles Bolton as Godber (13 episodes)
- Shirley Cheriton as Pat (1971) (3 episodes)
- Rosemary Faith as Daisy (12 episodes)
- Brinsley Forde as Herman (1971) (2 episodes)
- Billy Hamon as Des (12 episodes)
- David Howe as Colin Lovelace (1970–1971) (6 episodes)
- Linda Joliff as Elizabeth Jane Tye (1971) (2 episodes)
- Barry McCarthy as Terry Stringer (12 episodes)
- Drina Pavlovic as Celia (12 episodes)
- Roderick Smith as Philip Larch (1971) (3 episodes)
- Ian Lane as Kenny "Podge" Bethell

=== Other ===
- Jill Kerman as Penny Hedges (nee Wheeler) (1970) (14 episodes)
- Ann Lancaster as Mrs Pearce (1968) (2 episodes)
- Barbara Mitchell as Mrs Abbott (1969–1970) (2 episodes)
- Susan Richards as Madge Smith (2 episodes)

== Series overview ==
| Series | Episodes | Originally released | |
| Series | Episodes | First released | Last released |
|---|---|---|---|
| 1 | 7 | 8 November 1968 | 20 December 1968 |
| 2 | 13 | 20 September 1969 | 13 December 1969 |
| 3 | 14 | 20 September 1970 | 27 December 1970 |
| 4 | 21 | 18 September 1971 | 13 February 1972 |

== Episodes ==
NOTE: All of these episode descriptions have been taken from the DVD sleeves of the Please Sir DVDs, released by Network (In Australia, Series One and Two are available as one set of DVDs, Series Three (along with the 1971 Please Sir movie) as another).

Note: The first series was in an experimental 40-minute format (to fit in a 45-minute slot). Repeats of some first series episodes were later edited down into the standard 25-minute (half hour) runtime, losing a considerable amount of footage (and on occasion, plot detail) as a result. The remaining episodes were in the traditional 25-minute format (to fit in a 30-minute slot)

The transmission dates and times reflect the listings for the London ITV region. Listings for the alternative ITV regions are not indicated.

=== Series 1 (1968) ===
This series was recorded and transmitted in black and white on the VHF 405-line TV system.

| No. overall | No. in series | Title | Directed by | Written by | Original release date |
|---|---|---|---|---|---|
| 1 | 1 | "The Welcome Mat" | Mark Stuart | John Esmonde and Bob Larbey | 8 November 1968 |
When newly-qualified teacher Bernard Hedges arrives at Fenn Street Secondary Modern School to start his first job, even he hasn't bargained on what awaits him.
| 2 | 2 | "A Picture of Innocence" | Mark Stuart | John Esmonde and Bob Larbey | 15 November 1968 |
Bernard Hedges has to use all his tact when a member of the art club produces some stunning life studies of one of his unruly class - in the nude.
| 3 | 3 | "Maureen Bullock Loves Sir" | Mark Stuart | John Esmonde and Bob Larbey | 22 November 1968 |
Things start hotting up for Bernard Hedges when a pupil gets a crush on him. He thinks that he is settling into the district rather well, but when Maureen Bullock is seen leaving his new flat (after his class have helped him move into the flat), the rumours begin to fly.
| 4 | 4 | "A Near Greek Tragedy" | Mark Stuart | John Esmonde and Bob Larbey | 29 November 1968 |
This episode was shown later than usual as it contains swearing. Apollon Abapellogopholis means more problems for Bernard Hedges. Pronouncing his name is trouble enough, but when Appollon rings the school fire alarm he decides to take firm measures with the boy.
| 5 | 5 | "Barbarian Librarians" | Mark Stuart | John Esmonde and Bob Larbey | 6 December 1968 |
This episode was shown later than usual as it contains swearing. Bernard Hedges' touching faith in the virtues of 5C is often misplaced. The worst seems to have happened when he entrusts them with the library key in order to look after the library, outside school hours.
| 6 | 6 | "Student Princess" | Mark Stuart | John Esmonde and Bob Larbey | 13 December 1968 |
An old flame from Bernard's student days turns up as a trainee teacher. She disrupts not only his life but 5C's as well.
| 7 | 7 | "It's the Thought that Counts" | Mark Stuart | John Esmonde and Bob Larbey | 20 December 1968 |
End-of-term at Fenn Street, and the staff wait for their traditional presents from their forms. Bernard's anticipation at the thought of what he might get from 5C is tempered by the news that the injured Mr Wiggins will be fit to return as 5C's form master next term.

=== Series 2 (1969) ===
All of these episodes were made in colour, although all the episodes up to The Generation Gap were transmitted in monochrome, as ITV began colour transmission on Saturday 15 November 1969. All were shown in colour in a repeat run, seen in some ITV regions in early 1970.

| No. overall | No. in series | Title | Directed by | Written by | Original release date |
|---|---|---|---|---|---|
| 8 | 1 | "They're Off" | Mark Stuart | John Esmonde and Bob Larbey | 20 September 1969 |
Bernard's attempts to teach maths by using betting as an example earns him admiration from not only 5C but a man who just happens to be painting the classroom walls.
| 9 | 2 | "Common Law" | Mark Stuart | John Esmonde and Bob Larbey | 27 September 1969 |
It's 5C to the rescue when Sharon is attacked on the common going home. Suspicion falls on Potter the Caretaker but how can he prove his innocence?
| 10 | 3 | "Panalal Passes By" | Mark Stuart | John Esmonde and Bob Larbey | 4 October 1969 |
Bernard's efforts to stimulate interest in the Parent-teacher Association ends in chaos when Panalal, a young Indian boy, joins 5C.
| 11 | 4 | "The Sporting Life" | Mark Stuart | John Esmonde and Bob Larbey | 11 October 1969 |
Bernard's new job as sports master gives him the chance to help Eric Duffy solve a problem. Then Eric decides that one good turn deserves another.
| 12 | 5 | "Norman's Conquest" | Mark Stuart | John Esmonde and Bob Larbey | 18 October 1969 |
Potter the caretaker fought in the North Africa regiment during World War II - known as the "desert rats". So when Form 5C get the chance to adopt an animal, they decide on a Jerboa, otherwise known as a desert rat and decide to call him Norman.
| 13 | 6 | "X Certificate" | Mark Stuart | John Esmonde and Bob Larbey | 25 October 1969 |
Fenn Street is having an open day and each class must contribute, even 5C. The only problem is that no-one told Bernard.
| 14 | 7 | "The Decent Thing" | Mark Stuart | John Esmonde and Bob Larbey | 1 November 1969 |
After a particularly raucous night out, Bernard wakes up in a strange bed in a state of alcoholic confusion. Things get worse when he discovers the bed belongs to Sharon's mother.
| 15 | 8 | "The Generation Gap" | Mark Stuart | John Esmonde and Bob Larbey | 8 November 1969 |
Potter's on the warpath as someone has painted his wellies but 5C claim innocence. Bernard tries to get them interested in caring for geriatrics but the enthusiasm is lacking.
| 16 | 9 | "Life Without Doris" | Mark Stuart | John Esmonde and Bob Larbey | 15 November 1969 |
Miss Ewell entertains an offer of migrating to Australia and the staff and kids rejoice. But if she goes then her role as Deputy Headteacher needs filling and Mr Price (science teacher) has his eye on it.
| 17 | 10 | "The School Captain" | Mark Stuart | John Esmonde and Bob Larbey | 22 November 1969 |
The Headmaster, Mr Cromwell, decides to divide the school into houses. But Bernard discovers that 5C's voting methods do not run along the normal lines.
| 18 | 11 | "Out of the Frying Pan" | Mark Stuart | John Esmonde and Bob Larbey | 29 November 1969 |
Fenn Street School dinners are not very appetising, and teachers and pupils alike are avoiding them. Bernard does his best to remedy the situation, but he discovers Mr Potter is in league with the cook. Only the Headmaster considers the dinners to be tasty, but he doesn't realise that it isn't the school cook cooking them.
| 19 | 12 | "Mixed Doubles" | Mark Stuart | John Esmonde and Bob Larbey | 6 December 1969 |
The Headmaster invites the staff out to dinner to celebrate his birthday - at their own expense. Abbott endeavours to copy Duffy's technique with the opposite sex, but after a night out with Maureen Bullock, he only lands himself in trouble with the police.
| 20 | 13 | "Dress Circle" | Mark Stuart | John Esmonde and Bob Larbey | 13 December 1969 |
The staff arrange an outing to the theatre for the fifth form. But the redoubtable Miss Ewell dampens the enthusiasm of all concerned by disapproving of the choice of dress of some of the pupils. Annoyed at being sent home to change, Bernard and 5C plan - and get - their revenge later in the day.

=== Series 3 (1970) ===
The final three episodes of this series were affected by the ITV Colour Strike, which affected all ITV programmes recorded between November 1970 and March 1971. As a result of this industrial action, these affected episodes were recorded and transmitted in black and white.

| No. overall | No. in series | Title | Directed by | Written by | Original release date |
|---|---|---|---|---|---|
| 21 | 1 | "Ag Bow Rumber" | Mark Stuart | John Esmonde and Bob Larbey | 20 September 1970 |
A new term starts at Fenn Street and this means even more trouble for Bernard Hedges. Apart from the day-to-day hazards of teaching 5C, he has to prepare his unruly bunch for their imminent launching on an unsuspecting world. As prospective school leavers, 5C have to consider their future prospects. Bernard is also considering his, in the shapely form of Penny Wheeler (whom he met in the Please Sir! (1971) feature film, in which he took 5C on a two-week school trip to the Woodbridge Activity Centre).
| 22 | 2 | "Stitches and Hitches" | Mark Stuart. | John Esmonde and Bob Larbey | 27 September 1970 |
Bernard gets engaged - and Abbott gets appendicitis.
| 23 | 3 | "Knick Knack Taffy Whack" | Mark Stuart | John Esmonde and Bob Larbey | 4 October 1970 |
Why does one set about weighing Fenn Street School? It seems that Bernard believes that acts like this will help prepare 5C for their entry into the great, wide world at the end of this term.
| 24 | 4 | "Enter Mister Sibley" | Mark Stuart | John Esmonde and Bob Larbey | 11 October 1970 |
Duffy enters the embraces of the cold and harsh world outside school and finds it - cold and harsh.
| 25 | 5 | "It's a Saint Bernard's Life" | Mark Stuart | John Esmonde and Bob Larbey | 18 October 1970 |
When Smithy (Mr Smith) falls ill in the country, Bernard sees Reigate in all its rustic glory. He is quite smitten and dreams of the idyllic married life there, but his fiance, Penny, dreams otherwise.
| 26 | 6 | "Two and Two Make Nun" | Mark Stuart | John Esmonde and Bob Larbey | 25 October 1970 |
Maureen feels rejected - not only by Sir, but now by Monsignor Sopwith.
| 27 | 7 | "The Honour of the School" | Mark Stuart | John Esmonde and Bob Larbey | 1 November 1970 |
Bernard has an annoying habit of being honourable - even when playing golf. But what of his pupils? When Duffy invites Sharon to a half-term Majorcan holiday, will the habit be catching?
| 28 | 8 | "Cromwell's Last Stand" | Alan Wallis | John Esmonde and Bob Larbey | 8 November 1970 |
When "Hank" Abbott, private detective, goes into action, he opens the cupboards that let out the skeletons. One produces a rash of honesty from Potter. The other makes Cromwell feel that Miss Ewell might yet be won back from Mr Sibley (careers advisor).
| 29 | 9 | "Catch a Falling Drop-Out" | Mark Stuart | John Esmonde and Bob Larbey | 15 November 1970 |
Bernard and 5C drop in at the Conservative Club and make new friends. Maureen also makes a new friend, but he is more interested in dropping out.
| 30 | 10 | "A Star is Born" | Alan Wallis | John Esmonde and Bob Larbey | 22 November 1970 |
It takes a face in a thousand to star in an advertising campaign, but Bernard and Potter make it a two-horse race.
| 31 | 11 | "The Facts of Life" | Alan Wallis | John Esmonde and Bob Larbey | 29 November 1970 |
When Bernard hears Abbott's version of the facts of life - which can only be described as high fiction - he feels that it is time to teach 5C the facts of life in an adult way. The only problem is, the Headmaster thinks that the rabbit reproductive system is good enough.
| 32 | 12 | "Situations Vacant" | Alan Wallis | John Esmonde and Bob Larbey | 6 December 1970 |
With the end of the school term approaching, most of Fenn Street's form 5C are already fixed up with jobs, but animal-loving Dennis Dunstable still has no apparent future. Then Bernard has a brainwave which looks like the solution - he suggests Dennis for a stable-lad's job down at the local brewery. But Dennis's bullying, alcoholic dad won't let him work there due to a dispute with the pub's landlord.
| 33 | 13 | "Peace in Our Time" | Mark Stuart | John Esmonde and Bob Larbey | 13 December 1970 |
As 5C break up for the very last time, they prepare to take life by the throat, the shirt, the vest or anything else they can lay their hands on.
| 34 | 14 | "Christmas Special: And Everyone Came Too" | Mark Stuart | John Esmonde and Bob Larbey | 27 December 1970 |
Bernard and Penny dream of their wedding day: it should be the happiest day of their lives. However, Potter is chief usher, class 5C are guests, the meteorological department forecasts snow and there are those inevitable unforeseen problems. So their dream acquires all the elements of a nightmare.

=== Series 4 (1971-1972) ===
Unlike the previous series, episodes were initially broadcast on a Saturday. However, there was a week's break in transmission between Episode 14 (Old Fennians Day) and Episode 15 (What Are You Incinerating). When it returned it was broadcast in a Sunday night slot. This was only in London. In the other ITV regions, it continued to be broadcast on Saturdays at 6:30pm, so the rest of the nation saw the last 7 episodes of this series one day before Londoners saw them.

| No. overall | No. in series | Title | Directed by | Written by | Original release date |
|---|---|---|---|---|---|
| 35 | 1 | "Identitwit" | Philip Casson | John Esmonde and Bob Larbey | 18 September 1971 |
Bernard has to say goodbye to his 5C class at Fenn Street School but his new class (4C) brings some unexpected problems.
| 36 | 2 | "The Pruning of Hedges" | Howard Ross | John Esmonde and Bob Larbey | 25 September 1971 |
Bernard has finally decided to leave Fenn Street School, but he finds that resigning is not as simple as he had imagined.
| 37 | 3 | "Vive La Revolution" | Philip Casson | Geoff Rowley and Andy Baker | 2 October 1971 |
All contributions are gratefully accepted when magazine time comes around at Fenn Street School. But headmaster Cromwell's efforts to muster his usual support are thwarted by an irate local shopkeeper and Fenn Street's alternative press - The Fenntasy.
| 38 | 4 | "A Rather Nasty Outbreak" | Howard Ross | Tony Bilbow | 9 October 1971 |
Guest: Peter Cleall Georgie Duffy is nervous. He is due to start his first term at Fenn Street School - three weeks late. But big brother Eric, a member of last year's 5C and an old hand at dealing with authority, explains that there is nothing to worry about. No-one, however, has taken into account the arrival of new master Gregory Dix on the scene.
| 39 | 5 | "David and Goliath" | Philip Casson | John Esmonde and Bob Larbey | 16 October 1971 |
Bernard Hedges has left Fenn Street School and the gap has been filled by Mr Dix, a living example of everything a teacher should not be. The staff long for a new young champion to challenge this tyrant, but when David Ffitchett-Brown arrives wearing beads, they wonder just what sort of champion they have.
| 40 | 6 | "AWOL" | Howard Ross | Geoff Rowley and Andy Baker | 23 October 1971 |
Cromwell's yo-yo obsession helps distract him from David's request for new school supplies, including a new television set that Mr Price attacked with Nitric Acid after his horse had lost a horse race. But between themselves and Potter they work out a cunning plan.
| 41 | 7 | "What's a Class Between Friends?" | Philip Casson | Geoff Rowley and Andy Baker | 30 October 1971 |
Guest: Mollie Sugden When Cromwell succumbs to an attack of administrative megalomania, the Charge of the Light Brigade is cancelled, a class is lost at the cinema and Mr Price is driven to drink.
| 42 | 8 | "Our Mr Price" | Howard Ross | Tony Bilbow | 6 November 1971 |
It looks as though Fenn Street will lose yet another teacher when Price applies for a job in industry. But can he really make the break?
| 43 | 9 | "Black Power" | Philip Casson | Tony Bilbow | 13 November 1971 |
Guest: Derek Griffiths Potter's repeated demands for an assistant are finally heeded, and Sidney Noakes arrives at Fenn Street.
| 44 | 10 | "False Alarm" | Howard Ross | John Esmonde and Bob Larbey | 20 November 1971 |
The amalgamation with neighbouring Weaver Street and the possibility of Fenn Street going comprehensive is more than the Fenn Street staff can cope with. And even Potter has to decide where his loyalties lie.
| 45 | 11 | "Sibley, Mumsie, Dodo and Georgie" | Philip Casson | Geoff Rowley and Andy Baker | 27 November 1971 |
For Miss Ewell, life is not exactly a bowl of cherries at the moment. There is the school inspection to be organised, and the new Weaver Street kids to keep under control. But then, Doris can always turn to Mr Sibley for comfort - at least until mother's interferences.
| 46 | 12 | "United we Sit" | Howard Ross | John Esmonde and Bob Larbey | 4 December 1971 |
Headmaster Cromwell makes a new rule about haircuts and skirts at Fenn Street School. But the kids won't take this lying down - they decide on a sit-in to ask for pupil representation on staff meetings.
| 47 | 13 | "Nemesis for Norman" | Philip Casson | John Esmonde and Bob Larbey | 11 December 1971 |
Potter's boasting about his war career gets out of hand when he is chosen to carry the banner at his El Alamein reunion.
| 48 | 14 | "Old Fennians Day" | Howard Ross | Tony Bilbow | 18 December 1971 |
Cromwell's latest idea is a school song for the first meeting of his newly-formed Old Fennians Association. With the staff bursting into a flurry of musical activity, and the return of the old Form 5C for the big event, it is a day to remember.
| 49 | 15 | "What Are You Incinerating" | Philip Casson | Geoff Rowley and Andy Baker | 2 January 1972 |
The headmaster's "Clean Up Fenn Street" campaign is in full swing. But when Potter takes on some temporary assistance, an explosive situation develops which threatens to clean up Fenn Street for good.
| 50 | 16 | "The Ugly Ducklings" | Howard Ross | John Esmonde and Bob Larbey | 9 January 1972 |
Miss Ewell gets her "mountie", Miss Petting her mandarin and Daisy her "prince".
| 51 | 17 | "Cup Fever" | Philip Casson | John Esmonde and Bob Larbey | 16 January 1972 |
Fenn Street School makes sporting history when its football team reaches the semi-final of the district cup. But Miss Ewell has a match of her own with the star of the team, and if she wins, the school loses.
| 52 | 18 | "Please Give Generously" | Howard Ross | Geoff Rowley and Andy Baker | 23 January 1972 |
When Fenn Street School holds a charity walk for the local "old and needy", the staff are confident of its success. But deciding just who the "needy" are, can be a tricky business.
| 53 | 19 | "Blodwyn All Over" | Alan Wallis | Geoff Rowley and Andy Baker | 30 January 1972 |
When the chairman of the Fenn Street School governors makes rash promises to his "niece", the whole school is affected. Cromwell gets a secretary, the kids get a pin-up, and Pricey gets a whole new outlook on life.
| 54 | 20 | "The Price War" | Howard Ross | Tony Bilbow | 6 February 1972 |
Headmaster Cromwell has a new toy to help him communicate with the whole school, but Price does not want to keep in touch, for an old enemy is out to get him.
| 55 | 21 | "The Fixer" | Howard Ross | John Esmonde and Bob Larbey | 13 February 1972 |
Wedding bells ring out for Miss Ewell and Mr Sibley. Meanwhile, Potter's ding-dong with his wife Ruby ends in a fly-away flourish.

== Characters ==
Staff

Mr Bernard Hedges (Portrayed by John Alderton). A teacher fresh out of training. He was allocated Class 5C, the most unruly form in the school, at the beginning of term. At first relations were frosty between Bernard and Class 5C, but gradually Bernard gained the respect of his class and the rest of the staff. As the series progressed, he is shown to be a caring and very fair teacher and would always defend his form, regardless of how much evidence is put towards them.

In the movie, he met air stewardess Penny Wheeler. After misinterpreting a 'few white lies' made by a pupil accidentally left behind, Penny began to take shine to Bernard. After a period of dating, Bernard attempted to propose to Penny but she already said yes before he could complete his sentence and they got engaged and later married.

Shortly after Bernard got married, a new term started and he was allocated Class 4C. However, it was not quite the same as 5C. He later resigned and left at the end of Series 4 episode 2 to take a course in Sociology at the University of London..

Mr Norman Potter (Portrayed by Deryck Guyler). The pedantic and officious school caretaker. His speech is peppered with malapropisms. He claimed to have been a Desert Rat and constantly complains about the unruly behaviour of Hedges' class 5C. He is fiercely loyal (to the point of sycophancy) to the headmaster but a thorn in the side of the rest of the staff. His various comeuppances provide much of the ongoing humour of the sitcom. He often talks of his wife Ruby but she is never seen on-screen.

Mr Maurice Cromwell (Portrayed by Noel Howlett). The Headteacher – nicknamed "Oliver"– is a well-meaning, idealistic and liberal figure. He is also utterly ineffectual. He is admired and consistently flattered by his deputy Miss Ewell and caretaker Potter but regarded more ambivalently by Hedges and Price. He is the only person in the school who is unable to see through Potter's trouble-making and incompetence and sometimes ends up in childish arguments with the otherwise mild-mannered Mr Smith. Later in the Series his relationship with Miss Ewell becomes more strained but he does make a bond with new teacher Miss Petting.

Miss Doris Ewell (Portrayed by Joan Sanderson). Nicknamed Doris "Rotten" Ewell or "Old Mother Ewell", she is Mr Cromwell's deputy and is rigorously strict and humourless, not just with the pupils but also the staff and as a result she is an unpopular – but feared – figure. Her icy demeanour initially only breaks when she is with the headteacher to whom she is devoted but later on she strikes up a romantic relationship with careers teacher Mr Sibley who is capable of getting her to relax her strict standards. In Series 4 in particular – possibly linked to her new relationship – Miss Ewell becomes more critical of the Head, becoming increasingly frustrated with his incompetence, limited work ethic and immature behaviour. Just before the final episode she marries Mr Sibley off-screen.

Mr Smith (Portrayed by Erik Chitty). Mr Smith's unusual first name of "Osborne" reflects his rather quaint and old-fashioned personality although he is more commonly called "Smithy" by staff and pupils. He teaches Geography and – rather incongruously given his advancing years – P.E. An affable man he is occasionally drawn into childish spats with the Headteacher. He is utterly devoted to his wife Madge & often talks about her, even bringing her picture to school which he brings out when he has the lunch she has prepared. Similar to Potter's wife Ruby she is a character much discussed but very rarely seen on screen.

Mr Vaughan Price (Portrayed by Richard Davies). A science and maths teacher nicknamed "Pricey" by staff and pupils, any enthusiasm for teaching he once had had long since disappeared. His personality swings between sarcastic and subversive humour (often with a poetic turn of phrase) to fury, particularly when antagonised by pupils. The only things that seem to enthuse Mr Price are alcohol, women (unrequited) and pride in his Welsh identity.

Mr Gregory Dix (Portrayed by Glynn Edwards). He appears for two episodes in Series 4. A former army physical training instructor he is aggressive and bullying in his manner, showing contempt towards pupils and other staff – especially Potter. He unites pupils and staff against him although the weak Head is reluctant to challenge him.

Mr David Ffitchett-Brown (Portrayed by Richard Warwick). Ffitchett-Brown arrives early in Series 4. He is a very posh former army officer but despite his traditional background he is a flashy dresser, drives a sports car and has liberal and progressive views on education. He has a strong sense of humour and a fearless streak – he is the only member of staff confident enough to confront Mr Dix.

Mr John Hurst (Portrayed by Bernard Holley). Mr Hurst arrives almost half-way through Series 4 – he used to teach at Weaver Street which has just been closed down leading to an influx of its former pupils at Fenn Street. He has a good sense of humour and a mild cynicism but without the more noted eccentricities of other staff.

Miss Gloria Petting (Portrayed by Vivienne Martin). Miss Petting arrives at the same time as Mr Hurst but unlike him she has no experience of teaching secondary school pupils – indeed her only experience has been teaching at nursery school and she tries to use the same techniques at Fenn Street. Although she is good-natured and dedicated she is completely out of her depth and is often left upset by 5C. Her rather innocent nature does though help her make a connection with the similarly naive Mr Cromwell who also likes her desire to please after Miss Ewell drifts away from him.

Pupils

Eric Duffy (Portrayed by Peter Cleall). Eric is the undisputed leader of the pupils. He has a tough demeanour and although – in common with almost all the pupils – he displays little enthusiasm for school he generally does the right thing and is always fair-minded.

Peter Craven (Portrayed by Malcolm McFee) Nicknamed "Cottage", Craven is known for his sharp dress-sense and wise-cracking and after Duffy he is the most influential of the boys.

Dennis Dunstable (Portrayed by Peter Denyer) Dennis has learning difficulties and his misunderstandings are sometimes the source of humour but he always impresses with his good intentions and positivity and therefore is popular with just about everyone in the school (Potter being an occasional exception). In one of the ways in which the show occasionally touched on more serious themes Dennis often talks about the cruelty of his father towards him and his mother and staff and pupils are united in their solidarity with him.

Frankie Abbott (Portrayed by David Barry) Abbott is a trouble-maker and fantasist who often tries to portray himself as tough and talented (e.g. that he is a private eye called "Hank Abbott") but is always exposed as inept and immature. He is regarded with derision by staff and his fellow pupils. He is embarrassed by his mother (played by Barbara Mitchell) who calls him "my little soldier" and makes all-too clear that he has a lot of growing-up to do.

Sharon Eversleigh (Portrayed by Penny Spencer, and later portrayed by Carol Hawkins) Sharon dresses and acts in a flirtatious manner, often to the embarrassment of her teacher Mr Hedges but to the approval of the boys. She is well-versed in relationships, including with Duffy and Craven as well as the unseen "Vic".

Maureen Bullock (Portrayed by Liz Gebhardt) Maureen has two passions in life – her Catholic faith and her very public crush on Mr Hedges, which he does his best not to indulge but is never successful in deflecting her interest. She is generally one of the more dedicated pupils and often talks of her religious leader Monsignor Sopwith – another of the rarely seen (only one episode), much-discussed characters in the show. She is, though, capable of occasional protests and rebellious behaviour, often when she feels overlooked by Mr Hedges. She generally gets on well with Sharon but the two occasionally have their differences with Maureen regarding Sharon as sometimes crossing the line in her appearance and provocative demeanour.

Former Weaver Street pupils (Series 4 only)

Terry Stringer (Portrayed by Barry McCarthy) Stringer is the leader of the former Weaver Street pupils who arrive almost half-way through Series 4. He therefore has some similarities with Eric Duffy but without the latter's good-humour, wit and essential good-naturedness. Also unlike Eric he relies on another pupil (Gobber) to make sure the others follow his lead.

Gobber (Portrayed by Charles Bolton). His actual name is Robin Gibbon but he is almost always referred to as "Gobber". Like Dennis in the first three series Gobber has learning difficulties but unlike Dennis he is aggressive and intimidating, used by Terry Stringer as his "enforcer".

Des (Portrayed by Billy Hamon) Des is almost always seen with his guitar and often interrupts lessons by trying to break into song (often of a protest or blues style) but his attempts at music-making are tuneless, raucous and abysmal. He does seem to have rather more of a talent at football but even then his defiant nature brings him into difficulties.

Celia (Portrayed by Drina Pavlovic) and Daisy (portrayed by Rosemary Faith) are two friends but it is a rather one-sided friendship with Daisy doting on Celia. Daisy lacks confidence, particularly in her appearance, and makes a connection with the similarly unconfident Miss Petting.

== See also ==
- British sitcom
- List of films based on British sitcoms
- Welcome Back, Kotter
