= Bernard Holley =

British actor (1940–2021)

- Born: Bernard John Holley; 9 August 1940; Eastcote, Middlesex, England
- Died: 22 November 2021 (aged 81)
- Education: Rose Bruford College
- Occupation: Actor
- Years active: 1960–2021
- Known for: The Tomb of the Cybermen; Please Sir!; The Gentle Touch; Z-Cars; The Claws of Axos; Birds of a Feather
- Spouse: Jean Holley
- Children: 1

Bernard John Holley (9 August 1940 – 22 November 2021) was a British actor whose career spanned more than six decades.

== Life and career ==
Holley was born in Eastcote, Middlesex. He attended Kilburn Grammar School and the Rose Bruford Drama School, and made his first professional stage appearance at the Theatre Royal, Lincoln, in 1963.

Holley came to notice in the long-running UK police drama series Z-Cars as PC Newcombe, a character he played for four years. He also appeared in Doctor Who, first as Peter Haydon in The Tomb of the Cybermen (1967), starring Patrick Troughton as the Doctor, and later as the Axon Man in The Claws of Axos (1971), starring Jon Pertwee. Holley reprised his role as Axos in a new Doctor Who audio drama, The Feast of Axos, opposite Colin Baker, which was released on CD in February 2011. Holley played Mr Hurst in eight episodes of the popular ITV sitcom Please Sir! (1971-2). Other regular roles included Detective Inspector Mike Turnbull in The Gentle Touch (1982–84), a character he also played in an episode of the follow-up series C.A.T.S. Eyes in 1985. He later played Richard in two seasons of Birds of a Feather in 1998. He also appeared as the Chief Constable in the popular drama series A Touch of Frost, in 1999 and returned to play the role in 2003. His later television appearances included roles in Hollyoaks, EastEnders, Doctors and Holby City.

Holley also voiced hundreds of television commercials, including the campaign for the PlayStation 3 game LittleBigPlanet, and presented many corporate videos.

His film roles included appearances in Travels with My Aunt (1972) and the film The Deadly Females (1976).

Holley also worked consistently on the stage in theatres across the UK, including Farnham, Brighton, Manchester, Edinburgh, Derby and Norwich. One of his last stage roles was in Allan Monkhouse's Mary Broome at the Orange Tree Theatre, Richmond, in 2011.

Holley died after a long illness on 22 November 2021, at the age of 81. He was survived by his wife, Jean and their son, Michael.
