= Peter Cleall =

British actor (b. 1944)

- Born: Peter Cleall; 16 March 1944 (age 82); Finchley, Middlesex, England, UK
- Education: East 15 Acting School
- Years active: 1964 – present
- Spouse(s): Catherine McNamara (1964–?) (divorced); Dione Inman (1989–present)
- Children: Miles Cleall; Damian Cleall; Daniel Cleall; Spencer Cleall

Peter Cleall (born 16 March 1944 in Finchley, Middlesex) is an actors' agent and former actor who is probably best known for playing wise-cracking Eric Duffy in the London Weekend Television comedy series Please Sir! which ran from 1968 to 1972, and its sequel The Fenn Street Gang from 1971 to 1973. He also advertised Tunes menthol sweets, as a passenger buying a train ticket to Nottingham, in 1985.

== Early life ==
Cleall's father was a draughtsman. He was educated at Brighton College and trained as an actor at East 15 Acting School.

== Career ==
Cleall began his acting career at Watford Palace Theatre and appeared at many theatres throughout the country including a number of seasons at Regent's Park Open Air Theatre. His first screen appearance was in the horror feature Theatre of Death (1967) which starred Christopher Lee, and his other film roles included Confessions of a Pop Performer (1975), Under the Doctor (1976), Adventures of a Plumber's Mate (1978), and the film version of Please Sir! in 1971.

Cleall played at the Edinburgh Festival and on tour in a one-person show titled The World Turned Upside Down which told of the experiences of an ordinary man caught up in the aftermath of the English Civil War.

He played Detective Sergeant Harrison in the BBC Radio 7 / Radio 4 Extra audio series "Detective", written by Raymond Barr.

Cleall has worked as an agent for over 20 years helping to run Pelham Associates, which is based in Brighton, East Sussex.

== Television appearances ==
- Please Sir
- The Fenn Street Gang
- D.H. Lawrence Playhouse
- Thirty-Minute Theatre
- Mickey Dunne
- Dixon of Dock Green
- The Paul Hogan Show
- Spooner's Patch
- Dempsey and Makepeace
- Minder
- Are You Being Served?
- Unipart TV advert: "Thousands of Parts for Millions of Cars" (co-stars Michael Ripper)
- Tunes TV advert: "Tunes help you breathe more easily"
- Fire Doors public information film: "Fire Doors Save Lives" (co-stars Patsy Rowlands)
- Grange Hill
- Peak Practice
- A Tale of Two Cities
- The Bill
- Casualty
- Growing Pains
- Thief Takers
- Big Deal
- Till Death Us Do Part
- EastEnders
- Special Branch
- Silent Witness
