= David Barry (actor) =

Welsh actor and novelist

- Born: Meurig Wyn Jones; 30 April 1943 (age 82); Bangor, Gwynedd, Wales
- Occupation(s): Actor, author
- Years active: 1964–present

David Barry (born Meurig Wyn Jones, 30 April 1943) is a Welsh actor and novelist. He is best known for his role as Frankie Abbott, (the gum-chewing mother's boy who was convinced he was extremely tough), in the LWT sitcom Please Sir! and the spin-off series The Fenn Street Gang.

He also appeared in two TV spin-off movies - Please Sir! (1971) and George and Mildred (1980).

His first broadcast script was written for The Fenn Street Gang and he wrote many episodes of Thames TV's Keep it in the Family.

In 2016 Barry reprised the role of Frankie Abbott in his own play A Day in the Lives of Frankie Abbott. In 2017, he appeared in the horror comedy short film Frankula. In 2018, he appeared in another horror comedy short film called Bad Friday.

Barry is also a novelist. His police thriller Each Man kills, set in Swansea, was published in 2002, followed by Willie the Actor in 2008. His autobiography was entitled Flashback. He has also written a children's book, The Ice Cream Time Machine. He lives in Tunbridge Wells, Kent.

== Bibliography ==
- Each Man Kills
- Willie the Actor
- Murder in Wales
- Muscle
- A Deadly Diversion
- Walking Shadows
- Careless Talk
- More Careless Talk
- The Franz Anton Mesmer Show
- The Ice Cream Time Machine
- Mr Micawber Down Under
- Flashback: An Autobiography
- The Wrecking Bar (as Meurig Jones)
- Missing Persons (as Meurig Jones)
