= John Alderton =

English actor (born 1940)

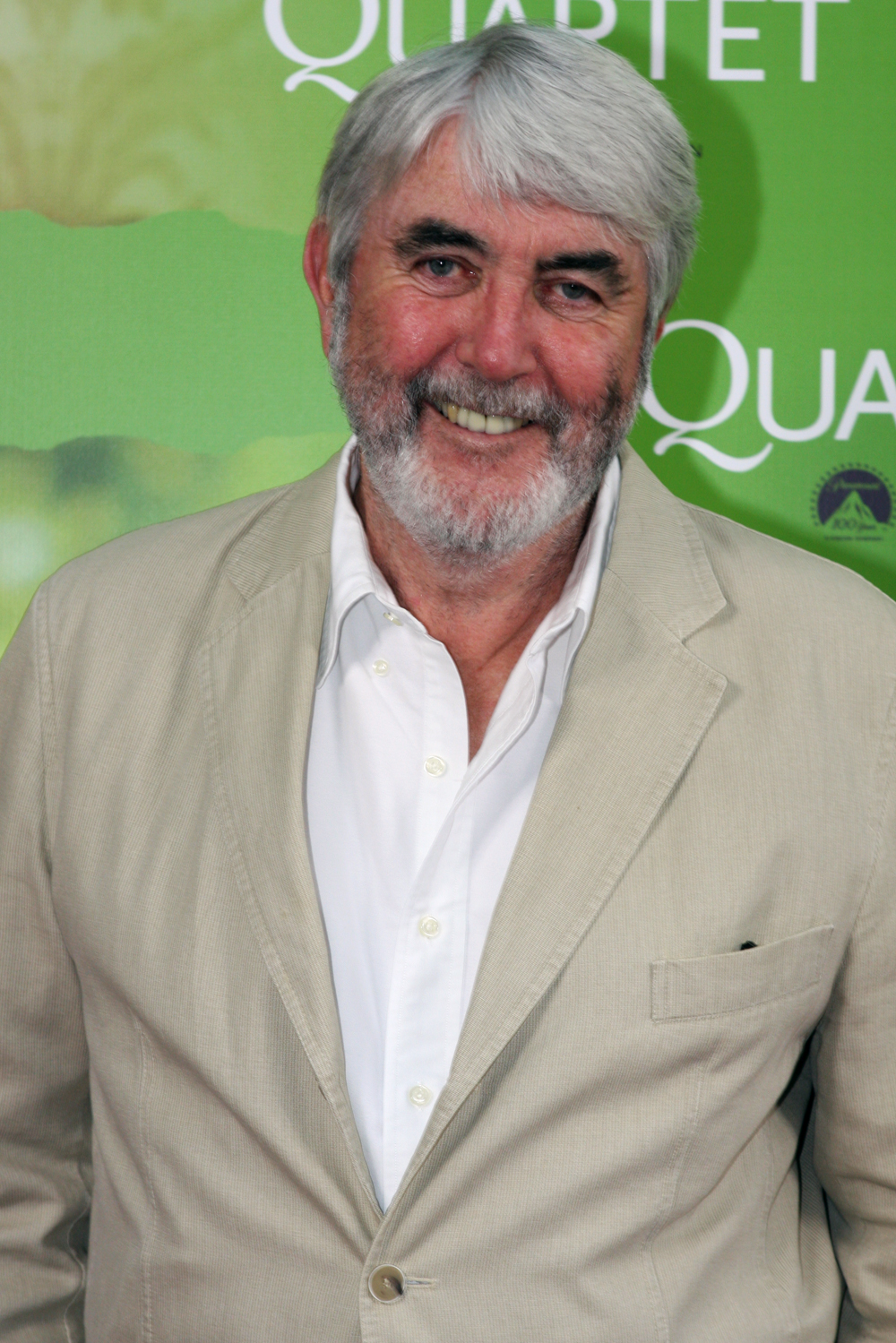
- Alderton in 2012
- Born: 27 November 1940 (age 85); Gainsborough, Lincolnshire, England
- Occupation: Actor
- Years active: 1962–2010
- Spouses: Jill Browne (m. 1964; div. 1969) Pauline Collins (m. 1969; died 2025)
- Children: 3

John Alderton (born 27 November 1940) is an English retired actor. He is best known for his roles in Upstairs, Downstairs, Thomas & Sarah, Wodehouse Playhouse, Little Miss (original television series), Please Sir!, No - Honestly and Fireman Sam (the original series). Alderton often starred alongside his second wife, Pauline Collins.

== Early life ==
Alderton was born on 27 November 1940 in Gainsborough, Lincolnshire, the son of Ivy (née Handley) and Gordon John Alderton. He grew up in Hull where he attended Kingston High School.

== Career ==
He graduated from the Royal Academy of Dramatic Art in 1961 and appeared in their production of The Doctor and The Devils by Dylan Thomas. Alderton first became familiar to television viewers in 1962, when he played Dr Moone in the ITV soap opera Emergency Ward 10. After an uncredited role in Cleopatra (1963), and appearing in British films such as The System (1964), Assignment K (1968), Duffy (1968) and Hannibal Brooks (1969), he played the lead in the comedy series Please Sir!, as hapless teacher Mr Hedges, which later resulted in him also playing the character in the 1971 feature film of the same name. He was cast by Richard Lester in the title role of a film version of Flashman but the project was abandoned.

In 1972, he appeared with Hannah Gordon in the BBC comedy series My Wife Next Door which ran for 13 episodes, and for which he won a Jacob's Award in 1975. He then joined another top-rated ITV series where he played Thomas Watkins, the chauffeur, in Upstairs, Downstairs, opposite his wife, Pauline Collins. They had a daughter (the actress Kate Alderton) and two sons and also acted together in spin-off series, Thomas & Sarah, and another sitcom, No - Honestly, as well as in Wodehouse Playhouse (1975–78), a series featuring adaptations of short stories by P. G. Wodehouse (primarily the Mr. Mulliner stories). In the meantime, he appeared on the big screen against-type as 'Friend' in John Boorman's cult sci-fi film Zardoz (1974), before returning to more familiar territory, as 1930s Yorkshire vet James Herriot in the 1976 film, It Shouldn't Happen to a Vet. Filmink called him "the great lost British film star of the 1970s".

He was a subject of the television programme This Is Your Life in 1974 when he was surprised by Eamonn Andrews.

He made his first stage appearance with the repertory company of the Theatre Royal, York in August 1961, in Badger's Green by R. C. Sherriff. After a period in repertory, he made his first London appearance at the Mermaid, November 1965, as Harold Crompton in Spring and Port Wine, later transferring with the production to the Apollo. At the Aldwych. In March 1969, he played Eric Hoyden in the RSC's production of Dutch Uncle. At the Comedy Theatre, July 1969, he played Jimmy Cooper in The Night I Chased the Women with an Eel. At the Howff,London, in October 1973, he played Stanley in Punch and Judy Stories, and played the same part in Judies at the Comedy, January 1974. At the Shaw Theatre, London, in January 1975, he played Stanley in Pinter's The Birthday Party. At the Apollo, London in May 1976, he played four parts in Ayckbourn's Confusions.

During the 1980s and 1990s, Alderton had a few roles. He narrated BBC1's children's original animated series Little Miss in 1983 (with his wife Pauline Collins) and, from 1987 to 1994, narrated and voiced all the characters in the original series of Fireman Sam. From 1987 to 1988 he played Estragon in Samuel Beckett's Waiting For Godot at the National Theatre. In 1988, he starred as Surgeon Robert Sandy in Tales of the Unexpected, in the episode "The Surgeon", and from 1989 to 1992 he starred in the series Forever Green as the character Jack Boult. He also appeared in the film Clockwork Mice in 1995. Alderton played opposite his wife Pauline in Mrs Caldicot's Cabbage War in 2002 and made something of a comeback in the 2003 film, Calendar Girls. In 2004, he played a role in the BBC series of Anthony Trollope's He Knew He Was Right. Also in 2004, Alderton starred in the first series of ITV1's Doc Martin in an episode entitled "Of All The Harbours in All The Towns" as sailor John Slater, a friend and former lover of Aunt Joan. He played Christopher Casby in the 2008 BBC adaptation of Charles Dickens' Little Dorrit.

== Personal life ==
Alderton married actress Jill Browne in 1964, but they divorced. In 1969, he married actress Pauline Collins. They had three children, a daughter (who is an actress) and two sons.

== Filmography ==
=== Film ===
Year	Title	Role	Notes
1963	Cleopatra	1st Officer	Uncredited
1964	The System	Nidge	
1965	Operation Crossbow	RAF 'Dakota' Navigator	Uncredited
1968	Assignment K	George	
1968	Duffy	Antony	
1969	Hannibal Brooks	Bernard	
1971	Please Sir!	Bernard Hedges	
1974	Zardoz	Friend	
1976	It Shouldn't Happen to a Vet	James Herriot	
1995	Clockwork Mice	Swaney	
2002	Mrs Caldicot's Cabbage War	Hawksmoor	
2003	Calendar Girls	John Clarke	
2010	Magic Hour 2	Robert	

=== Television ===
Year	Title	Role	Notes
1962–1963	Emergency Ward 10	Richard Moone	Series regular
1963	Drama 61-67	Peter Harris	Episode: "Drama '63: Question of Guilt"
1965	The Sullavan Brothers	Norman Vincent	Episode: "Insufficient Evidence"
1965	Londoners	Telfer, Rait's Assistant	Episode: "A Little Touch of Henry"
1965	Six of the Best	Alf	Episode: "Annie Doesn't Live Here Anymore"
1965	Love Story	Albert	Episode: "Twice Upon a Time"
1966	In the West End Tonight	Harold Crompton	TV film
1968	The Wednesday Play	Charley	Episode: "Mooney and His Caravans"
1968	Thirty-Minute Theatre	Geoffrey Bell	Episode: "A Personal Affair"
1968	Armchair Theatre	Peter	Episode: "One Night I Danced with Mr Dalton"
1968	Never a Cross Word	Blackdown	Episode: "Mr and Mrs Baldock and Friend"
1968	Boy Meets Girl	Gerald	Episode: "Easy on the Clutch"
1968–1971	Please Sir!	Bernard Hedges	Series regular
1969	All Star Comedy Carnival	Bernard Hedges	TV film
1969	BBC Play of the Month	Octavius Caesar	Episode: "Julius Caesar"
1969	Thirty-Minute Theatre	Richard Fox	Episode: "Roly Poly"
1969	The Wednesday Play	Mike	Episode: "A Serpent in Putney"
1970	BBC Play of the Month	Bob Acres	Episode: "The Rivals"
1970	BBC Play of the Month	Malcolm	Episode: "Macbeth"
1971	The Fenn Street Gang	Bernard Hedges	3 episodes
1972	BBC Play of the Month	Tom Wrench	Episode: "Trelawny of the Wells"
1972	ITV Sunday Night Theatre	Ben Spray	Episode: "Ben Spray"
1972	My Wife Next Door	George Bassett	Series regular
1972–1973	Upstairs, Downstairs	Thomas Watkins	Recurring role
1973	ITV Play of the Week	Azarius	Episode: "Tobias and the Angel"
1974–1975	No, Honestly	Charles Danby	Series regular
1975–1978	Wodehouse Playhouse	Various roles	Series regular
1977	The Upchat Line	Mike Upchat	Recurring role
1979	Thomas & Sarah	Thomas Watkins	Series regular
1980	Play for Today	Paul Clements	Episode: "A Walk in the Forest"
1980	Tales of the Unexpected	Rev. George Duckworth	Episode: "Georgy Porgy"
1983–1984	Father's Day	Lyall Jarvis	Series regular
1987–1994	Fireman Sam	Narrator, all voices	Voice role
1988	Tales of the Unexpected	Robert Sandy	Episode: "The Surgeon"
1989–1992	Forever Green	Jack Boult	Series regular
1990	Screenplay	Doug	Episode: "Keeping Tom Nice"
1991	Tonight at 8.30	Various roles	3 episodes
1996	Testament: The Bible in Animation	Jonah	Episode: "Jonah", voice role
1998	Heartbeat	Jim Ryan	Episode: "The Enemy Within"
1998	The Mrs Bradley Mysteries	Alastair Bing	Episode: "Speedy Death"
1999	Peak Practice	Harry Capper	Episode: "Before the Lights Go Out"
2001	Dalziel and Pascoe	Sgt Ted Lock	Episode: "Secrets of the Dead"
2004	Down to Earth	David Brewer	Episode: "Family Ties"
2004	He Knew He Was Right	Mr Outhouse	Miniseries
2004	Doc Martin	John Slater	Episode: "Of All the Harbours in All the Towns"
2008	Little Dorrit	Mr Casby	Series regular
