= Penny Spencer =

British actress (born 1948)

Penny Spencer is a British actress, remembered for her performance as coquettish schoolgirl Sharon Eversleigh (1968–1970) in the LWT television comedy series Please Sir! (1968–1972).

== Early life ==
She attended Coombe Girls School in New Malden, Surrey.

== Career ==
Spencer's earliest acting experience was with the amateur theatre group led by Buster Merryfield.

In addition to Please Sir!, her TV appearances include UFO (1970) and Public Eye (1972). Her films include The Whisperers (1967), The Best Pair of Legs in the Business (1973) and Under the Doctor (1976).

In 2017 and 2019, she was a guest at conventions organised by the Gerry and Sylvia Anderson appreciation group Fanderson, and in 2018 appeared at a Please Sir! reunion event.

== Filmography ==
- Georgy Girl (1966) – Kate (uncredited)
- The Whisperers (1967) – Mavis Noonan
- Countdown to Danger (1967, Children's Film Foundation) – Sue
- The Best House in London (1969) – Evelyn (uncredited)
- The Best Pair of Legs in the Business (1973) – Eunice
- Under the Doctor (1976) – Marion Parson
- The Playbirds (1978) – W.P.C. Andrews

== Television ==
- Mickey Dunne (1967) – starlet (Episode 5: "Yes – But Can He Go the Distance?")
- Please Sir! (1968–1970, Series 1 – Series 3) – Sharon Eversleigh
- Man in a Suitcase (1968) – second model (Episode 4: "Variation on a Million Bucks: Part 1")
- Dixon of Dock Green (1968) – Karen Dewar (Episode 18.8: "The Informant")
- Crossroads (1968) – Muriel Pawcett (Episodes 836–838)
- Mr Rose (1968) – secretary (Episode 2.5: "The Dead Commercial")
- Call My Bluff (1969–1970) – self/panellist (Episodes 4.3, 4.24, 4.39)
- All Star Comedy Carnival (1969 and 1971, Please Sir! sketches) – Sharon Eversleigh
- Anything You Can Do (1970–1971) – self/judge (Episodes 2.14, 3.3, 3.8)
- Frost on Sunday at the British Film and Television Awards (1970) – Sharon Eversleigh
- Paul Temple (1970) – Maria (Episode 2.3: "Games People Play")
- The Troubleshooters a.k.a. Mogul (1970) – Poppy Mandragora (Episode 6.9: "Boys and Girls Come Out to Play")
- UFO (1970) – Janis (Pilot episode: "Identified"); SHADO operative (Episode 5: "A Question of Priorities", Episode 22: "The Responsibility Seat")
- The Golden Shot (1970) – self ("Peoples past and present", 5 April 1970)
- All Gas and Gaiters (1971) – Felicity Pugh Critchley (Episode 5.6: "The Bishop Loses his Chaplain")
- Seasons of the Year (1971) – Ruby (Episode 5: "It's Cold Outside")
- Public Eye (1972) – Pauline (Episode 6.6: "Horse and Carriage")
- The Dick Emery Show (1972) – Episode 11.8
- Dixon of Dock Green (1972) – girl at accident (Episode 14.19: "The White Mercedes")
- The Man Outside (1972) – Mildred (Episode 6: "Cuculus Canorus")
- A Picture of Katherine Mansfield (1973) – Kitty (Episode 1: "The Garden Party")
- This Is Your Life (1974) – self/guest (Episode 14.8: subject Derek Guyler)
- Lucky Feller (1976) – woman in street (Episode 11: "The Boat")
