= Get Some In! =

- Created by: John Esmonde; Bob Larbey
- Directed by: Michael Mills
- Starring: Tony Selby; David Janson; Robert Lindsay; Karl Howman; Gerard Ryder; Brian Pettifer; Lori Wells; John D. Collins; Jenny Cryst (Jenny Clarke); Robert Fountain
- Composer: Alan Braden
- Country of origin: United Kingdom
- Original language: English
- No. of series: 5
- No. of episodes: 33 (and 1 special)

Production
- Producer: Michael Mills
- Running time: 30 minutes
- Production company: Thames Television

Original release
- Network: ITV
- Release: 16 October 1975 – 18 May 1978

Get Some In! is a British television sitcom about National Service life in the Royal Air Force, broadcast between 1975 and 1978 by Thames Television. Scripts were by John Esmonde and Bob Larbey, the team behind sitcoms such as The Good Life.

The programme drew its inspiration from late 1950s – early 1960s National Service situation-comedy The Army Game and from nostalgic BBC TV sitcom Dad's Army. Thirty-four (commercial) half-hour episodes were made.

The title is a contraction of "Get some service in!", which was a piece of Second World War-era military slang sometimes shouted by conscripted soldiers at civilians of conscription age whom the conscripts may have believed were avoiding call-up.

Episodes aired on UK Gold between 1994 and 1996, with Forces TV (UK) later repeating the whole series in 2016 and 2019. Further repeats aired on Talking Pictures TV in 2019, 2021 and 2022. It was screened in Australia in the early 1980s.

== Premise ==
The overarching concept follows a single hut of recruits at RAF Skelton in 1955. They are a disparate group lead, through default, by Jakey Smith. Most stories concern their ongoing conflict with the sadistic corporal who runs the hut. The corporal lives in married quarters on site, and this female dimension gives an occasional sexual dimension to the plots.

Relocation in series 3 to RAF Midham next to a WAAF station allowed an additional sexual angle, as did Corporal Marsh moving into married quarters on-site (albeit a caravan). Marsh also decides to retrain and effectively becomes an equal rather than superior to the other men as all train to be medics. Series 4 ends with the main group posted to Malta as medics.

Series 5 is effectively a hospital comedy.

== Characters ==
=== National Service recruits ===
- Ken Richardson. A former grammar school pupil, Ken is very well-mannered much to the disgust of Corporal Marsh. Due to his education, he often finds himself on the receiving end of insults from Corporal Marsh such as "poofhouse" and "Nance" (short for "Nancy Boy", i.e. homosexual). Far from being homosexual, Richardson falls quickly for the charms of Lilley's sister Agnes, and later for Mrs. Fairfax - an officer's wife. Richardson is kind to all the other national servicemen, despite exhibiting obvious differences from them. Played by David Janson.
- Jakey Smith, a former Teddy Boy from London. Jakey soon finds himself at odds with Corporal Marsh, and dislikes the whole concept of National Service. He has little or no respect for authority but is at heart a decent individual. Marsh delights in calling him "Edward VII", an allusion to his former Teddy Boy culture, though on leave Jakey finds himself no longer accepted amongst the Teds. Played by Robert Lindsay (Series 1–4) until Lindsay left to star in his own show Citizen Smith, and then by Karl Howman (Series 5).
- Matthew Lilley, a mild mannered vicar's son who plays the harpsichord. Raised to be God-fearing, Lilley prides himself on not hating anybody - not even Marsh. Though naturally shy, Matthew is usually the first to object to Corporal Marsh's shady schemes. Marsh sometimes calls him "Holy Joe" or "Christopher Robin" - the latter an allusion to the poem Vespers by A.A. Milne (in which the first and final stanzas end with the line "Christopher Robin is saying his prayers"). In series 3 and 4 Lilley shows a phobia for blood and body parts which causes him to faint but nevertheless he scores high as a medic and passes the exam. Played by Gerard Ryder.
- Bruce Leckie. A Scotsman from Glasgow and is a supporter of Glasgow Rangers, Bruce has a very cynical view of life and is a pessimist. Cpl. Marsh called him "Jockstrap" and "Jock". Like Jakey, he does not like being conscripted for National Service. Bruce is very shy around women but eventually falls in love with and finds happiness with Corporal Wendy (Jenny Cryst), though this happiness is short-lived as after Bruce completes his trade training they are both posted to different RAF stations, but get married in series 4. Played by Brian Pettifer.

=== Officers and instructors ===
- Corporal Percy Marsh GM. Corporal, later sergeant, later corporal, later AC1, later corporal, Marsh is a drill instructor who becomes the bane of the recruits' lives. A man with a sadistic sense of humour and few (if any) friends, he continually makes his charges' lives miserable. He has an eidetic memory and an eerie aptitude for mental arithmetic, which are sometimes mistaken for high intelligence. Marsh always craves promotion but his own schemes usually backfire preventing him from attaining his goal. At the end of series 4 he is demoted for cheating in an exam, though he later regains his rank by faking an act of heroism (for which he also receives the George Medal). Played by Tony Selby.
- Squadron Leader Clive Baker. Medical officer of RAF Skelton and later anatomy instructor at RAF Midham. Played by John D. Collins.
- Flight Lieutenant Roland Grant. Officer commanding C Flight and Marsh's superior at Skelton. He dislikes Marsh's bullying, but his public school code of conduct prevents him from doing much about it; when forced to exert his authority, he generally sides with Marsh. Played by David Quilter.
- Group-captain Ruark. Played by Nigel Pegram.
- The Padre. A mild-mannered priest who caters for the recruits' spiritual needs - though only Lilley ever has much to do with him. Played by Tim Barrett.

=== Other characters ===
- Alice Marsh. Corporal Marsh's wife. She is constantly irritated by her husband's lack of advancement in the RAF, but she is a kind-hearted woman and is good to the recruits, much to the irritation of Marsh. She left him during the fourth series, only to return in the end. Played by Lori Wells.
- Mrs Fairfax. Wife of one of the senior officers, a beautiful and compassionate lady who despises Marsh and is kind to recruits. Richardson develops a crush on her in Series 2. Played by Angela Thorne.
- Corporal Wendy Williams/Leckie. A WRAF corporal who marries Bruce Leckie in the fourth season. Played by Jenny Cryst.

== Episodes ==
=== Series overview ===
| Series | Episodes | Originally released | |
| Series | Episodes | First released | Last released |
|---|---|---|---|
| 1 | 7 | 16 October 1975 | 27 November 1975 |
| Special | 1 | 25 December 1975 | |
| 2 | 7 | 28 June 1976 | 9 August 1976 |
| 3 | 6 | 6 January 1977 | 10 February 1977 |
| 4 | 6 | 16 June 1977 | 21 July 1977 |
| 5 | 7 | 6 April 1978 | 18 May 1978 |

=== Series 1 (1975) ===
| No. | Title | Produced and directed by | Original release date |
|---|---|---|---|
| 1 | "Call Up" | Michael Mills | 16 October 1975 |
Sadistic Drill Instructor, Corporal Percy Marsh takes charge of C Flight, a new intake of National Servicemen who have joined the Royal Air Force. Ken Richardson is a former grammar school pupil, Jakey Smith is a teddy boy, Bruce Leckie is a pessimistic Glaswegian and Matthew Lilley is a vicar’s mild-mannered son. Marsh tries to fiddle a good posting to Hong Kong for himself and his wife, Alice. With Talfryn Thomas as Corporal White, Ralph Watson as Corporal Potts, Seymour Green as Rev. Lilley and Tom Watson as Mr. Richardson.
| 2 | "Kit" | Michael Mills | 23 October 1975 |
Marsh finds Smith with a gift box of ladies’ handkerchiefs. As Smith doesn’t expect to see his girl again, he agrees to sell them to Marsh. While Marsh visits his wife with the hankies, the recruits collect their kit from the supply stores. Richardson loses his kit while helping Lilley and when Marsh confronts the supply store clerk, he discovers a hanky and suspects the clerk of having an affair with Alice.
| 3 | "Medical" | Michael Mills | 30 October 1975 |
C Flight visit Sqn Ldr Baker, the Medical Officer, for their physical examination. Smith has a plan to get thrown out and pretends his hearing is poor. Marsh subjects the recruits to square-bashing. Leckie wants to quit and makes a casual remark about shooting himself. When Leckie and some ammunition go missing, his friends fear the worst and look for him. With John D. Collins as the M.O. and Derek Deadman as Rankin.
| 4 | "At The Hop" | Michael Mills | 6 November 1975 |
After two weeks training, C Flight are allowed their first night off base. Smith plans to pick up a girl at the local dance hall and gets more than he bargained for. Leckie is confined to camp but still manages to enjoy himself. Following a domestic argument, Marsh accuses his wife of infidelity and, in a drunken state, he challenges Squadron Leader Baker.
| 5 | "Boots" | Michael Mills | 13 November 1975 |
Lilley’s attitude gets him into trouble with Marsh who punishes the whole group with extra bull. Infuriated by Lilley’ stubbornness to violate his self-esteem, Marsh nails Lilley’s boots to the floor and leaves him abandoned in the hut for hours. Richardson helps Smith write a letter to Jakey’s girl, Edna.
| 6 | "Picket Detail" | Michael Mills | 20 November 1975 |
Sergeant Dobson, soon to be demobbed, is in charge of the picket detail. C Flight enjoy his company and consider him to be the complete opposite to Marsh. However, when the sergeant turns up drunk and the air commodore is on a surprise inspection, the lads have to think fast to protect Dobson’s reputation and pension. With Alfred Marks as Sgt Dobson and Bernard Archard as Air-Commodore Sir Nigel Savage.
| 7 | "36 Hour Pass" | Michael Mills | 27 November 1975 |
C Flight get their first chance to travel home to see family. Marsh tries to keep them late and Leckie misses his train. Alice wants to visit Paris but Marsh makes excuses. Matthew offers Ken and Jakey a lift to London and they meet his sister, Agnes who leaves an impression on Ken. Jakey runs afoul of some local teddy boys and they all risk a charge for being AWOL when Agnes’ car won’t start. With Simon Callow as Wally and Johnnie Wade as Corporal 'Bunny' Warren.

=== Special (1975) ===
| No. | Title | Produced and directed by | Original release date |
|---|---|---|---|
| 8 | "Christmas at the Camp" | Robert Reed | 25 December 1975 |
It’s Christmas Day at RAF Skelton. C Flight are on maintenance duty while everyone else is on leave. Boredom soon sets in when they discover all of the entertainments and alcohol are locked up. Alice has insisted Marsh invites the four lads over for lunch but falls ill before she can cook a meal for them. Marsh doesn’t want to miss his Christmas dinner and insists the lads help him.

=== Series 2 (1976) ===
| No. | Title | Produced and directed by | Original release date |
|---|---|---|---|
| 9 | "Flight" | Michael Mills | 28 June 1976 |
C Flight head to RAF Wareham for target practice and their first time in an aircraft. Lilley's ineptitude on the rifle range has everyone ducking for cover. A last minute change of plan forces Marsh to confront his deepest fear. With George Baker as Wing Commander Birch
| 10 | "Coke" | Michael Mills | 5 July 1976 |
The camp is in the grip of a severe cold spell. Fuel is scarce and rationed. Despite their objections and best efforts, C Flight cannot stop Marsh from stealing their coke for his own house, to keep Alice warm. Ken finds out that Agnes is engaged and is crestfallen. Ken gets tasked to help Squadron Leader Fairfax’s wife and soon forgets about Agnes. With Angela Thorne as Mrs Fairfax.
| 11 | "Ejected" | Michael Mills | 12 July 1976 |
Marsh is uncharacteristically nice and impresses Alice with a car, hoping it will improve their social standing in the camp. Jakey’s request for compassionate leave is rejected so he goes AWOL to help his grandad with a landlord problem. Fearing Marsh will find out, the lads cover for Jakey. Alice explodes when she discovers where Marsh got the money for the car.
| 12 | "Field Exercise" | Michael Mills | 19 July 1976 |
C Flight are woken early for a field exercise. Their task is to make it back to camp and ring the bell. All that stands between them and victory is the formidable RAF Regiment as the enemy. Marsh umpires the event but not before he places Lilley in charge of the team. One by one, they are picked off by the enemy until just four remain. Lilley, overcome with a sudden rush of courage makes a last ditch attempt to reach the bell.
| 13 | "Crush" | Michael Mills | 26 July 1976 |
Jakey and Ken head to the local pub and meet two girls. Ken’s efforts fail while Jakey leaves triumphant. Marsh finds a way to avoid paying Leckie the two quid he owes him. Ken is sent to help Mrs Fairfax again and discovers she is leaving for Aden with her husband. A surprise encounter at the bus stop infuriates Marsh, much to everyone else’s delight. With Shirley Cheriton as Rhonda.
| 14 | "Complaints" | Michael Mills | 2 August 1976 |
Fed up with the disgusting food served in the canteen, the four friends try to complain. Marsh volunteers them to clean the large vats and they observe a double standard. Matthew has to complain and Corporal Jenner plots revenge with Marsh to lock Matthew in the freezer as payback. With Roy Kinnear as Chef, Corporal Lionel Jenner.
| 15 | "Rugby" | Michael Mills | 9 August 1976 |
Leckie shares his ideas on getting the red mist during bayonet practice. Richardson accepts an invitation to play rugby from Flt Lt Grant because of his grammar school background. Marsh sees a new opportunity to ingratiate himself with the officers.

=== Series 3 (1977) ===
| No. | Title | Produced and directed by | Original release date |
|---|---|---|---|
| 16 | "Erks" | Michael Mills | 6 January 1977 |
Flt Lt Grant wants C Flight to win the Inter-Flight Competition but feels that Marsh does not have the respect of the men in his command. He bribes Marsh with sergeant stripes if Marsh can deliver on the trophy. The lads are suspicious when Marsh lets slip that Grant is dying. Marsh throws his weight about in the Sergeant’s Mess but is soon put in his place by the other sergeants. To make matters worse, a careless moment in the hut spells disaster. With Don Henderson as Flt Sgt Tidy, David Sibley as LAC Steward and Keith Ashley as Sergeant. Erk refers to the lowest ranks of the RAF.
| 17 | "End Of Basic Training" | Michael Mills | 13 January 1977 |
As the basic training ends, the recruits attend a trades training interview in order to determine where they will serve the remainder of their National Service. Lilley is concerned they will go into separate trades and lose touch. Richardson aims too high attempting for a commission, Jakey tries some reverse psychology for his trade and Alice threatens to walk out on Marsh when he loses his stripes. As the recruits leave ahead of their postings, they have a special gift for Marsh. With Paul Eddington as Sqn Ldr Bush.
| 18 | "RAF Midham" | Michael Mills | 20 January 1977 |
The lads find they have all been posted to RAF Midham in Lancashire. They are all training to become nursing attendants. Jakey brightens up when he discovers WAAFs in the new camp. Flight Sergeant Wells welcomes them warmly, their accommodation is superb and, for the first time since enlisting, everything appears to be going their way - at least until Marsh turns up. With George Innes as Flt Sgt Wells.
| 19 | "Marsh’s Wife" | Michael Mills | 27 January 1977 |
Jakey teases the WAAFs and later, in the canteen, Bruce bumps into their NCO, Corporal Wendy who takes an interest in him. Marsh is preparing for Alice to arrive and forces the four friends to redecorate his dilapidated married quarters instead of allowing them to revise for their next lesson. Jakey plans to prank Marsh. With Jenny Cryst as Cpl Wendy.
| 20 | "The Human Body" | Michael Mills | 3 February 1977 |
Alice is less than pleased with the caravan and its lack of basic amenities. She and Marsh fall victim to Jakey’s prank. Much to everyone’s surprise, Marsh perfectly recites the muscles of the shoulder and upper arm. Ken sets out to discover how Marsh cheated. Matthew discovers that he may not be best suited to nursing.
| 21 | "Swimming" | Michael Mills | 10 February 1977 |
Wells demonstrates basic first aid techniques in the classroom. After lunch, Cpl Wendy is with her WAAFs in the pool when Marsh arrives with his squad. The swimmers begin fifty lengths while Marsh focuses on the non-swimmers and uses Bruce as a guinea-pig. Bruce loses consciousness when Marsh holds his head under the water for too long and Wendy performs resuscitation on him.

=== Series 4 (1977) ===
| No. | Title | Produced and directed by | Original release date |
|---|---|---|---|
| 22 | "Cards" | Michael Mills | 16 June 1977 |
Ken thinks his luck has changed when he meets Melody waiting for her bus. It falls through when she realises he hasn’t much money and she leaves. His unhappiness is short-lived when he comes to the aid of Alice who was hurt her finger at the bar. Short on cash himself, Marsh proposes a card game but Alice is angry when she discovers what he has wagered. With Cheryl Hall as Melody and Reg Lye as Barman.
| 23 | "New Room Mate" | Michael Mills | 23 June 1977 |
The lads find an extra bed in their room and wonder at the new arrival. Thrown out by Alice, the lads discover Marsh has moved himself into their room. Despite trying to overcome his fear of gore, Matthew continues to faint in the presence of anything related to surgery.
| 24 | "Blackpool" | Michael Mills | 30 June 1977 |
After one night of Marsh in the room, the lads are planning a way to get rid of him. A day trip to Blackpool reveals Alice working in a Hawaiian themed bar. Bruce and Wendy meet up and chat. Ken hatches a plan for Marsh and Alice to get together again.
| 25 | "Crash Exercise" | Michael Mills | 7 July 1977 |
The lads take part in a field training exercise of a mock downed aircraft with mock casualties. Matthew, Bruce and Jakey play injured victims. An ambulance driver reveals to Marsh that an additional civilian casualty with a broken leg has been arranged to test the medics. In his haste to complete the exercise, Marsh misses the diagnosis on the civilian and takes the wrong casualty to hospital.
| 26 | "Final Exams" | Michael Mills | 14 July 1977 |
The final exams have arrived and Ken panics as he realises he cannot retain information. Matthew tries to reassure Ken that everything will be alright while Jakey accepts that he won’t pass and Bruce announces he is going to get married. Marsh is confident he will pass when he seizes the opportunity to cheat during the exam. Matthew is more impressed that he didn’t faint.
| 27 | "Exam Results" | Michael Mills | 21 July 1977 |
Matthew and Ken pass out as nursing attendants. Jakey and Bruce are made ward orderlies. Marsh, also an orderly, loses his stripes due to cheating. Bruce is posted to Minden, Germany while the others are posted to Luqa, Malta. They try to appeal to Marsh to swap with Bruce but when Wendy says Minden is horrible, Marsh believes she is using reverse psychology and calls her bluff. At the last moment, Marsh’s posting to Minden is withdrawn and he contemplates his future at a local weir when he meets Alice. Believing fate has brought them together again, they rekindle their relationship.

=== Series 5 (1978) ===
| No. | Title | Produced and directed by | Original release date |
|---|---|---|---|
| 28 | "VIP Guard" | Michael Mills | 6 April 1978 |
After just a week in Malta, the lads are posted back to RAF Hospital Druidswater in England. Bruce meets Wendy at RAF Lyneham after she arranges to be posted to Luqa. Druidswater receives a VIP patient, a recently promoted, heroic corporal who selflessly carried his commanding officer 84 miles in sub-zero temperatures. Karl Howman replaces Robert Lindsay as Jakey Smith for the fifth series.
| 29 | "The Patient" | Michael Mills | 13 April 1978 |
Recovering from frostbite, Marsh makes life horrible for the medics by using them to tend to his every need. As a result, they cannot complete their regular tasks. Lilley begins to read a story to Marsh and reacts in horror as he realises it is a saucy novel. Group Captain Ruark is furious when he discovers a terrified patient has been cornered by the medics.
| 30 | "Death" | Michael Mills | 20 April 1978 |
Happy to be away from Marsh, the lads are reassigned to morgue duty with Sgt Foot. The sergeant welcomes the lads and notices a special talent in Bruce. Meanwhile, Alice worries what will happen to the lovely married quarters when Marsh is declared fit for duty and posted. Marsh discusses his options with Gp Capt Ruark. With Christopher Benjamin as Sergeant Foot.
| 31 | "The Morgue" | Michael Mills | 27 April 1978 |
Marsh boasts to Ruark how he is single-handedly reorganising the medical stores. In reality, he has enlisted the help of as many ACs as possible. After a mishap, Ken and Matthew misplace an amputated hand. Jakey suggest how to cover the loss and Bruce convinces Sgt Foot to allow him to incinerate it. Marsh finds out what really happened and tries to drop the lads in it.
| 32 | "Crisis" | Michael Mills | 4 May 1978 |
While working on the psychiatric ward, Jakey and Bruce spot an old face from RAF Skelton. Marsh works his way onto the detail taking Rankin for tests off-base and, against regulations, stops for a bite to eat. Rankin is drawn to the sound of the band and it’s only some quick thinking from Jakey that saves the day, leaving Marsh out of pocket.
| 33 | "Labrador" | Michael Mills | 11 May 1978 |
Invited as the ‘Meet the Celebrity’ guest speaker at the local church, Marsh embellishes his account of how he carried his CO, Wg Cdr ’Pinky’ Pinkerton, over 80 miles. Flashbacks reveal what actually happened. Matthew is furious that his parents have been taken in by Marsh’s lies. When Pinky’s diary turns up, it threatens to expose Marsh when it falls into Lilley’s hands. With Anthony Verner as Wing-Commander Pinkerton, Seymour Green as Reverend Lilley and Paul Luty as Mr. Talbot.
| 34 | "Operation Greenfly" | Michael Mills | 18 May 1978 |
Ruark sends the four friends to a remote island on a training exercise. He includes Marsh because of his survival skills in Labrador. Marsh manages to knock their rations and gear into the sea but he doesn’t care as he has made alternative plans to survive the exercise. They discover his secret and demand equal treatment. When a storm threatens the island and no one is where they are supposed to be, a plan is hatched.

== Stage show ==
A stage version of Get Some In! was produced for a 1977 summer season at the Princess Theatre, Torquay.

== Setting and filming locations ==
Series 1–2 were set at the fictional Royal Air Force station RAF Skelton. They were filmed at Hobbs Barracks near Felbridge in Surrey. The barracks are, as of 2017, an industrial estate.

At the beginning of the third series, the recruits' barracks hut is destroyed by fire and so in series 3–4 events were set at fictional RAF Midham. Series 5 was set at fictional RAF hospital Druidswater which was filmed at RAF Halton, the very first scene was filmed outside the old Guard room.

The Christmas special (broadcast between Series 1 and 2), set at RAF Skelton, was captioned "Christmas 1955", but the remainder of the series (involving two changes of camp) continued to be set in 1955.

== Home release ==
All five series including a 5-DVD set of the complete series of Get Some In! have been released by Network.

| DVD | Release date |
|---|---|
| The Complete Series 1 | 19 September 2008 |
| The Complete Series 2 | 28 January 2009 |
| The Complete Series 3 | 6 April 2009 |
| The Complete Series 4 | 20 July 2009 |
| The Complete Series 5 | 5 October 2009 |
| The Complete Series 1 to 5 Box Set | 2 November 2009 |
