= A Small Problem =

1987 British television series

- Written by: Tony Millan; Mike Walling
- Starring: Christopher Ryan
- Theme music composer: Mo Foster; Mike Walling
- Country of origin: United Kingdom
- No. of seasons: 1
- No. of episodes: 6

Original release
- Network: BBC Two
- Release: 26 January – 2 March 1987

A Small Problem is a British sitcom originally broadcast on BBC2 in 1987. Intended as a satire on prejudice, the show was set in a Britain with a form of apartheid based on people's height. Anyone below 5 ft 1 in (1.55 m) tall was forced to live in tower-block ghettos south of the River Thames.

The main characters of the show were Howard (Christopher Ryan, who had previously played Mike in The Young Ones), a cheerful cinema projectionist always making fun of things and quoting classic movies, but revealed to be in a member of terrorist group Short Liberation Front; Roy Pink (Mike Elles), who at 5 ft 3/4 in (1.543 m) was previously considered normal height, but with new EEC regulations, he was now considered short as his metric height of 1.54 m (5 ft 1 in) now fell below the new 1.55 m mark, thus relegating him to South London, whilst he always refused to consider himself short and even insulted other short characters, whilst getting no help for his predicament from his tall brother George (David Simeon), who with his wife Heather (Joan Blackham) were trying to erase him out of their lives; Fred (Dickie Arnold), the elderly head of the tower-block's Residents Association, who with his wife Lily (Christine Ozanne) are trying to make the best of a bad situation, only seeming to be concerned about trivial matters and not the heightist apartheid; Jenny (Cory Pulman), and petition-wielding activist trying to fight the system not to much success; Sid (Big Mick), a conniving dwarf who calls everyone a "dickhead", and Mr. Motokura (Tetsu Nishino), a rich Japanese businessman who came to Britain with his wife (Sayo Inaba) looking to build a factory, but ended up directed to the tower-block and trying to escape with his wife, whilst they struggle to communicate with others as they speak no English.

It was written by actors and comedy writers Tony Millan and Mike Walling. Walling was short himself at 5 ft 5 in (1.65 m), and one day, whilst walking to Millan's house, had noticed two men, one tall and one short, playing tennis, and how the tall man seemed to have an advantage, so during a brainstorming session, he pitched the idea. The theme tune was written by Mo Foster and Mike Walling.

== See also ==
- Heightism
