= John D. Collins =

English actor (born 1942)

- Born: John Christopher Dixon; 2 December 1942 (age 83); London, England
- Occupations: Actor, narrator
- Years active: 1965–2007

John Christopher Dixon (born 2 December 1942), billed as John D. Collins, is a British actor who played Flt. Lt. Fairfax, a stranded British airman in occupied France during World War II, in the BBC sitcom 'Allo 'Allo!. He is the actor to have been cast most frequently in writer/producer David Croft's sitcoms: a total of six different series and ten characters.

== Biography ==
Collins won the Ivor Novello and Robert Donat Scholarships to RADA. After graduating he went on to run the Summer Theatre at Frinton-on-Sea, Essex for three years and then went to work in the first season of the Nottingham Playhouse.

In his early years he made a number of films including the Hammer Film Dracula Has Risen from the Grave (1968), the film versions of Till Death Us Do Part (1969) and Dad's Army (1971), The Adventures of Barry McKenzie (1972), The Ghoul (1975), and The Boys in Blue (1982), and also many plays for Granada Television. As a vicar in Coronation Street, he failed to marry Albert Tatlock.

For ten years he worked with Spike Milligan as his assistant director and as an actor, in Son of Oblomov and The Bed-Sitting Room. He also appeared with Milligan in his 'Q’ series on television.

He became a regular cast member of two television series – A Family at War and also with Robert Lindsay in Get Some In!. He first worked for David Croft in the film version of Dad's Army in 1971, and subsequently was cast in episodes of It Ain't Half Hot Mum, Hi-de-Hi!, Are You Being Served? and Oh, Doctor Beeching!, as well his regular role in 'Allo 'Allo! and the recurring character of Jerry in You Rang, M'Lord?. Along with several other cast members of 'Allo 'Allo, Collins had previously appeared in Secret Army, the series of which 'Allo 'Allo was a parody.

Other TV work includes The Brittas Empire, On the Up, Birds of a Feather, Trial & Retribution, Peak Practice, Ain't Misbehavin', Harry's Mad, Wycliffe, Mosley, Some Mothers Do 'Ave 'Em, The Sweeney, Secret Army, Citizen Smith, Yes Minister, Doctor Who, Only Fools and Horses and Lovejoy.

Other theatre credits includes the tour of When Did You Last See Your Trousers?, The Winslow Boy, That's Showbiz, Richard III and the title role in King Lear. He has also played the role of Mr. Paravicini in the record-breaking production of The Mousetrap at St Martin's Theatre, London.

Collins has appeared in a number of pantomimes as Abanazer and as an ugly sister in Cinderella. He has narrated The Snowman, Carnival of the Animals, Peter and the Wolf and William Walton's Façade and has also recorded a Shakespearean CD with the Gesualdo Consort. He has just played the voice of God in Noye's Fludde by Benjamin Britten and has been appearing regularly as Henry VIII at the banquets in the Old Palace at Hatfield House.

Collins made two appearances in the British BBC sitcom Only Fools and Horses, initially in the episode "Ashes to Ashes", as a river policeman who informs Del and Rodney that they have to have river permission to empty ashes into a river (St. Katharine Docks). He then appeared in the later episode "Sleeping Dogs Lie" as the Veterinarian.

Collins has also appeared in BBC children's programme, including ChuckleVision as a flying instructor in the 1996 episode Dear Diary.

== Filmography ==
=== Film ===
Year	Title	Role	Notes
1968	Dracula Has Risen from the Grave	Student	
1968	Till Death Us Do Part	RAF Officer at Tube Station	
1970	Trog	TV Crewman Watching Monitor	Uncredited
1971	Dad's Army	Naval Officer - Lt. Short	
1972	The Adventures of Barry McKenzie	Toff at Young Conservatives' Ball	
1975	The Ghoul	Young Man	
1979	Le Pétomane	Unknown	Short film
1982	The Boys in Blue	Customs Officer	

=== Television ===
Year	Title	Role	Notes
1965	The Flying Swan	Gerald	Episode: "The Diamond Pendant"
1966	The Liars	Henry Bulkeley	Episode: #1.5
1966	The Man in Room 17	Bob Henty	Episode: "How to Rob a Bank - And Get Away with It"
1966	Theatre 625	Arkwright's son	Episode: "Girl of my Dreams"
1965–1966	ITV Play of the Week	Stephen Whittington Towneley	2 episodes
1969	The Saint	Chick	Episode: "The Man Who Gambled with Life"
1969	Coronation Street	Rev. Vernon Lingard	2 episodes
1971	A Family at War	Peter Bryant	6 episodes
1972	The Pathfinders	Flight Sergeant Taffy Williams	Episode: "One Man's Lancaster"
1973	Some Mothers Do 'Ave 'Em	Dr. Boyde	2 episodes
1975	The Venturers	Dr. Tate	Episode: "Gentleman's Agreement"
1975	The Changes	Unknown	Episode: "The Cavern"
1975	The Sweeney	Stephen Vane	Episode: "Poppy"
1976	When the Boat Comes In	Freddy Calderbeck	Episode: "King for a Day"
1975–1977	Get Some In!	Squadron Leader Baker Medical Officer	7 episodes
1979	Feet First	Michael Overton	Episode: #1.4
1979	Dick Barton: Special Agent	Miles	4 episodes
1978–1979	Q6	Various	11 episodes
1979	Rings on Their Fingers	The Estate Agent	Episode: "Home Market"
1978–1979	Secret Army	Inspector Paul Delon	5 episodes
1979	Citizen Smith	Army Officer	Episode: "The Glorious Day"
1978–1980	Bernie	Unknown	2 episodes
1980	Flesh and Blood	John Ewing	2 episodes
1980	Yes Minister	BBC Interviewer	Episode: "Jobs for the Boys"
1980	Grundy	City gent	Episode: "What You Don't See, Ask For"
1980	Cowboys	TV Reporter	Episode: "Remember Honky Stubbs"
1981	The Dick Emery Show	Unknown	Episode: #19.3
1981	Jackanory Playhouse	Vishikhila	Episode: "The Mouse, the Merchant and the Elephant"
1981	Coming Home	Assistant bank manager	Episode: #1.3
1981	Chintz	Joe Wilson	Episode: #1.2
1981	Shillingbury Tales	Arthur Warwick M.P.	Episode: "The Shillinhbury Daydream"
1980–1981	It Ain't Half Hot Mum	Capt Hutchins Charles Medical Officer	4 episodes
1981	Seconds Out	Sgt. Grimson The Television Reporter	2 episodes
1982	Shine on Harvey Moon	Harry	Episode: "In Sickness and in Health"
1982	The New Adventures of Lucky Jim	Charles Seymour	Episode: "The Big Smoke"
1982	Hi-de-Hi!	Bailiff	Episode: "Trouble and Strife"
1983	Doctor Who	Talor	Episode: "Arc of Infinity: Part One"
1983	Tears Before Bedtime	Estate agent	Episode: "Home from Home"
1981–1983	Are You Being Served?	2nd Waiter Doctor Secretary at Number Ten	3 episodes
1983	Triangle	Geoff Brooks	8 episodes
1984	Grandad	Mr Carter	Episode: #4.5
1984	Hammer House of Mystery and Suspense	Estate Agent	Episode: "In Possession"
1984	Chance in a Million	Thames News Reporter	Episode: "Stuff of Dreams"
1982–1985	Only Fools and Horses	Mr. Collins, the Vet River Policeman	2 episodes
1985	The Kenny Everett Television Show	Various	Episode: #3.5
1988	Rude Health	Agincourt	Episode: "Civil Defiance"
1991	Lovejoy	Reg	Episode: "One Born Every Minute"
1992	The Brittas Empire	Mr Kitson	Episode: "An Inspector Calls"
1992	On The Up	Drunken Guest	Episode: "Temporary Secretary"
1982–1992	'Allo 'Allo	Flying Officer Fairfax	64 episodes
1988–1993	You Rang, M'Lord?	Jerry	10 episodes
1993	The Real McCoy	Unknown	Episode: #3.5
1995	Peak Practice	David Cornish	Episode: "Other Lives"
1996	ChuckleVision	Pilot	Episode: "Dear Diary"
1995–1996	Oh Doctor Beeching!	Passenger	2 episodes
1997	Birds of a Feather	Chemist	Episode: "Relative Strangers"
1997	Ain't Misbehavin'	Medical Officer	Episode: #1.1
1997	Wycliffe	Armstrong	Episode: "Old Crimes, New Times"
1998	Mosley	Toastmaster	Episode: "Rules of the Game"
1998–1999	Trial & Retribution	Clerk of Court	2 episodes
2003	Fortysomething	MIddle Aged Man	Episode: #1.2
2007	The Return of 'Allo 'Allo!	Flying Officer Fairfax	Television film
2022	'Allo 'Allo! Forty Years of Laughter	Himself/Flying Officer Fairfax	Documentary
