= Ashenden: Or the British Agent =

1927 collection of loosely linked stories by W. Somerset Maugham

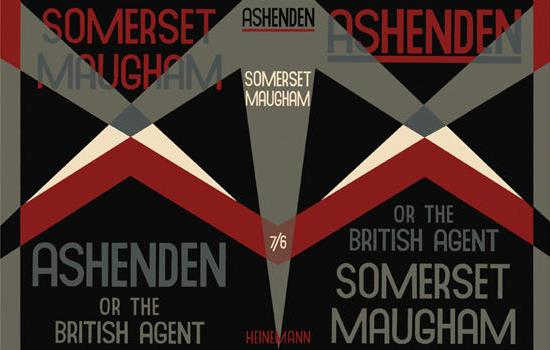
First UK edition (Heinemann)

Ashenden: Or the British Agent is a 1927 collection of loosely linked stories by W. Somerset Maugham. It is partly based on the author's experience as a member of British Intelligence in Europe during the First World War.

== Plot summary ==
During the First World War, a writer named Ashenden, referenced only by his surname, is enlisted as an agent through threats and promises by "R", a Colonel with British Intelligence. He is sent to Switzerland where he becomes involved in a number of counter-intelligence operations; these he accomplishes by means of persuasion, bribery, blackmail or coincidence. He does not use a weapon.

In one, he accompanies a man called the Hairless Mexican to Italy, where they are to intercept important papers carried by an arriving Greek agent of the Germans. The Hairless Mexican meets the only Greek on the incoming ship, and during a search of the Greek's hotel room, the Hairless Mexican and Ashenden do not find any papers. As they prepare to leave the country, Ashenden decodes a cable which tells him that the intended Greek had never boarded the ship; spots of dried blood on the Hairless Mexican's sleeve mean that he had killed the wrong man.

In another, Ashenden must induce an Italian dancer to betray her lover, an anti-British Indian and a German agent, by convincing him to cross the border from neutral Switzerland to see her in allied France, where the Allies can arrest him. The ironic denouement is that after the man is captured by the British, he commits suicide before he can be arrested, tried and executed. When she finds out of his death, the dancer goes to Ashenden and asks to get back the valuable watch she had given to the man whom she has just betrayed.

After a number of similar operations, Ashenden is sent to Imperial Russia during the 1917 revolution, as an "agent of influence", to do what he can to keep Russia in the war against Germany. He spends eleven days on the train from Vladivostok to Petrograd sharing a cabin with Harrington, an American business man who is a constant conversationalist. A few days after they arrive, the revolution breaks out in earnest. As they try to evacuate, the business man insists on getting back his laundry that had been sent out. During his return with the laundry, Harrington is killed in a street riot.

The stories combine Maugham's talent at character detail with a tragic structure where an affecting and sometimes funny person is damaged in the game of national spying. Some regard these as the forerunner of all the more sceptical spy fiction written by such as Eric Ambler, Graham Greene and books such as The Spy Who Came in from the Cold. Raymond Chandler was a great admirer of Ashenden, writing to the author in January 1950: "There are no other great spy stories – none at all. I have been searching and I know".

=== Chapters ===
1. R.
2. A Domiciliary Visit
3. Miss King
4. The Hairless Mexican
5. The Dark Woman
6. The Greek
7. A Trip to Paris
8. Giulia Lazzari
9. Gustav
10. The Traitor
11. Behind the Scenes
12. His Excellency
13. The Flip of a Coin
14. A Chance Acquaintance
15. Love and Russian Literature
16. Mr. Harrington's Washing

In later collections, the chapters are combined and collected under different titles, as below.

- "A Domiciliary Visit" & "Miss King" as Miss King
- "The Hairless Mexican", "The Dark Woman", "The Greek" as The Hairless Mexican
- "A Trip to Paris, "Giulia Lazzari" as Giulia Lazzari
- "Gustav", "The Traitor" as The Traitor
- "Behind the Scenes", "His Excellency", as His Excellency
- "A Chance Acquaintance", "Love and Russian Literature", "Mr. Harrington's Washing" as Mr. Harrington's Washing

== Origins ==
The incidents described in the stories are modelled on Maugham's experiences as a secret agent, and "the central character, Ashenden, is very much an autobiographical character." He is supposed to have modelled Chandra Lal after Virendranath Chattopadhyaya, an Indian Nationalist in Germany during the war. Maugham, who was in the British Secret Service in Europe during the war, based a number of his stories on his own experiences. Among other enterprises, Britain's European intelligence network attempted to eliminate a number of Indian nationalists in Europe, notably members of the Berlin Committee. Donald Gullick, a British agent, was dispatched to assassinate Chattopadhaya while the latter was on his way to Geneva to meet another Indian nationalist, Mahendra Pratap and forward the Kaiser's invitation to Berlin. The short story of Giulia Lazzari is a blend of Gullick's attempts to assassinate Chattopadhyaya and Mata Hari's story. Winston Churchill reportedly advised Maugham to burn 14 other stories.

== Adaptations ==
=== Film ===
- The 1936 Alfred Hitchcock-directed film Secret Agent is a loose adaptation of "The Traitor" and "The Hairless Mexican", with John Gielgud as Ashenden (whose "real" name is Edgar Brodie), and Peter Lorre as The General.
- In the 1950 anthology film Trio, Ashenden was played by Roland Culver in the third story called "Sanatorium".

=== Television ===
- On 7 August 1959, BBC Television broadcast a live version of "The Traitor." Written by Troy Kennedy Martin and directed by Gerard Glaister, it starred Stephen Murray as Ashenden, Donald Pleasence as Grantley Caypor, and Mai Zetterling as Frau Caypor. No copy is known to exist.
- A number of the stories formed the basis of the 1991 four-part BBC1 series Ashenden, written by David Pirie and directed by Christopher Morahan, with Alex Jennings in the title role, Joss Ackland as Cumming and Ian Bannen as 'R'. Guest actors included Harriet Walter as Giulia Lazzari in the first episode, Alan Bennett as Grantly Caypor in the second, René Auberjonois as John Quincy Harrington in the third, with Elizabeth McGovern as Aileen Sommerville and Alfred Molina as Carmona, the hairless Mexican, in the final story. A framing device at the start of each episode shows progressively more of an aged Ashenden living in France in the mid-1960s, reacting adversely to a piece of music on the radio. The final episode – which gives the context to this reaction – closes with a return to this "future" setting.

=== Radio ===
There have been many full cast adaptations of the stories for BBC Radio.

- 1940, Miss King adapted by M. H. Allen andproduced by Val Gielgud. Starring Ronald Squire as Ashenden.
- 1940, Giulia Lazzari adapted by M. H. Allen and produced by Val Gielgud. Starring Ronald Squire as Ashenden.
- 1940, The Traitor adapted by M. H. Allen and produced by Val Gielgud. Starring Ronald Squire as Ashenden.
- 1940, The Hairless Mexican adapted by M. H. Allen and produced by Val Gielgud.
- 1943, The Hairless Mexican adapted by Hugh Stewart and produced by Howard Rose. Part of the Saturday Night Theatre series.
- 1947, The Traitor adapted by Hugh Stewart and produced by Mary Hope Allen. Starring Laidman Browne as Ashenden.
- 1947, Ashenden: Miss King adapted by Mary Hope Allen and produced by Neil Tuson. Starring Richard Williams as Ashenden.
- 1947, Ashenden: The Hairless Mexican adapted by Hugh Stewart and produced by Neil Tuson. Starring Richard Williams as Ashenden.
- 1947, Ashenden: Giulia Lazzari adapted by Mary Hope Allen and produced by Neil Tuson. Starring Richard Williams as Ashenden.
- 1947, Ashenden: The Traitor adapted by Hugh Stewart and produced by Neil Tuson. Starring Richard Williams as Ashenden.
- 1947, Ashenden: His Excellency adapted and produced by Neil Tuson. Starring Richard Williams as Ashenden.
- 1947, Ashenden: Mr. Harrington's Washing adapted and produced by Neil Tuson. Starring Richard Williams as Ashenden.
- 1953, Cakes and Ale adapted by Howard Agg and produced by Val Gielgud.
- 1954, The Tenth Man adapted by Peggy Wells and produced by Archie Campbell. Part of the Saturday Night Theatre series.
- 1968, Cakes and Ale adapted by Howard Agg and produced by Martyn C. Webster. Starring Raymond Huntley as Ashenden.
- 1974, Cakes and Ale in three episodes, adapted by Harry Green and produced by Richard Beynon. Starring Michael Hordern as Ashenden.

There are also various BBC serialised solo readings:

- 1966, Ashenden – Secret Agent 1914–1918: The Hairless Mexican in five episodes, adapted by Howard Agg, produced by George Angell and read by Leo Genn.
- 1967, Ashenden – Secret Agent 1914–1918: Giulia Lazzari in five episodes, adapted by Howard Agg, produced by George Angell and read by Leo Genn.
- 1969, Ashenden – Secret Agent 1914–1918: The Hairless Mexican in five episodes, adapted by Marjorie Bilbow, produced by George Angell and read by Roger Delgado. Part of the Book at Bedtime series.
- 1969, Ashenden – Secret Agent 1914–1918: Giulia Lazzari in five episodes, adapted by Marjorie Bilbow, produced by George Angell and read by Roger Delgado. Part of the Book at Bedtime series.
- 1970, Ashenden – Secret Agent 1914–1918: Mr. Harrington's Washing in five episodes, adapted and read by Roger Delgado, produced by George Angell. Part of the Book at Bedtime series.
- 2002, Cakes and Ale in ten episodes, abridged and produced by Jane Marshall, read by Richard Pasco. Part of the Book at Bedtime series
- 2007, Ashenden, Gentleman Spy in five episodes, abridged by Neville Teller, produced by Eoin O'Callaghan and read by Alex Jennings. Part of the Book at Bedtime series.

There is also at least one full length audiobook:

- 2012, Ashenden unabridged, read by Christopher Oxford and released by Audible audiobooks.

== Other appearances ==
A character named "William Ashenden" is the narrator of Maugham's 1930 novel Cakes and Ale. A character named Ashenden also appears in several other of Maugham's short stories.

The character appears briefly in the book The Bloody Red Baron by Kim Newman.

"Ashenden" is mentioned a number of times in the Mick Herron novel "Slow Horses".

== Sources ==
- Barooah, N.K (2004), Chatto: The Life and Times of an Anti-Imperialist in Europe, Oxford University Press, USA, ISBN 0-19-566547-3.
- Popplewell, Richard J (1995), Intelligence and Imperial Defence: British Intelligence and the Defence of the Indian Empire 1904–1924, Routledge, ISBN 0-7146-4580-X.
