= Joan Blackham =

British actress (1946–2020)

- Born: Joan M. Blackham; 15 May 1946; Wolverhampton, Staffordshire, England
- Died: 6 September 2020 (aged 74); London, England
- Occupation: Actress
- Years active: 1977–2020

Joan Blackham (15 May 1946 – 6 September 2020) was a British actress with a long stage, film and television career.

== Education ==
Blackham attended The Alice Ottley School, Worcester and was head of Carroll house.

== Career ==
Blackham was a professional actress and supply teacher, including special needs. She studied at the New College of Speech and Drama in London and with the Open University. She was a board member of Women in Film and Television UK and co-produced script-reading sessions for its Writers' Group.

== Selected appearances ==
=== Stage ===
- Calendar Girls (Chichester/National tour, West End, 2008) – Brenda Hulse/Lady Cravenshire
- Jane Eyre (Shared Experience at the West Yorkshire Playhouse, Leeds, 1999) – Mrs. Reed/Mrs. Fairfax
- The Man of Mode (RSC) – Lady Townley
- The Love of the Nightingale (RSC) – Queen/Chorus
- King Lear (RSC) – Goneril
- Across Oka (RSC) – Margaret

=== Film ===
- Return to Waterloo (1984) – Mother
- Keep the Aspidistra Flying (1997) – Librarian
- Bridget Jones's Diary (2001) – Shirley
- Mothers and Daughters (2004) – Paddy, a mother who just can't help but meddle
- Twisted Sisters (2006) – Jennifer's mother
- These Foolish Things (2006) – Mrs. Griffin
- The Sweeney (2012) – Landlady
- The Knot (2012) – Aunt Claire
- Battle for Sevastopol (2015) – Eleanor Roosevelt
- A Prominent Patient (2017) – Mrs. Fitzgerald

=== Television ===
- The Fall and Rise of Reginald Perrin (1977) Season 2, 2 Episodes – Miss Erith
- To the Manor Born (1980) Series 2, Episode 2 The Spare Room – Diana 'Podge' Hodge, a glamorous divorcee
- Take a Letter, Mr. Jones (1981) All 6 episodes – Ruth
- Sweet Sixteen (1983) All 6 episodes – Jane
- Chocky's Challenge (1986) All 6 episodes – Mrs. Gibson
- Home to Roost (1987) Series 3, 6 Episodes – Fiona Fennell
- Intimate Contact (1987) - Headmistress
- The Castle of Adventure (1990) All 8 episodes – the school teacher
- Inspector Morse (1993) Season 7, Episode 3 Twilight of the Gods – Helen Buscott
- Judge John Deed (2003–2006) 8 episodes over 3 seasons – Lady Vera Everard
- Blue Murder (2003–2009) 2 episodes over 2 seasons – Diane
- Midsomer Murders (2011) Season 13, Episode 7 Not in My Back Yard – Maureen Stubbs
- Doctors (2012) Season 13, Episode 182 Baby Steps – Eleanor Lawson
- Doctor Who (2014) Series 8, Episode 11 Dark Water - the Woman

=== Video games ===
- Dark Souls III (2016) – High Priestess Emma (voice)
- Fragments of Him (2016) – Mary (voice)
- Warhammer Age of Sigmar: Storm Ground (2021) – Crone (voice)

== See also ==
- List of people from Wolverhampton
