= Mike Walling =

English comic actor and screenwriter (1950–2020)

- Born: Michael John Walling; 8 July 1950; Salford, Lancashire, England
- Died: 29 June 2020 (aged 69); Manchester, England
- Occupations: Actor, screenwriter, comedian.

Michael John Walling (8 July 1950 – 29 June 2020) was an English comic actor and screenwriter.

== Career ==
Walling began his career as an English teacher at Holland Park School in London. In the mid-1970s, while still a teacher, he won a British TV talent contest, New Faces, with a comedy double act called "Mr Carline & Mr Walling." He immediately left teaching and embarked on launching his new career in comedy. When the comedy duo ended their partnership, Walling moved into situation comedy, appearing in several series—"Just Liz", "Bootle Saddles" and then the highly successful "Brush Strokes". He began starting to get more work as a screenwriter when he teamed up with Tony Millan. The two of them wrote screenplays for a number of different shows, as well as their own series.

In the early 1980s Walling teamed up with session bass player Mo Foster for various comedy music projects, with Walling writing the lyrics and Foster writing the music and producing the resulting songs.

One of their songs, "The Papadum Song", a novelty song revolving around two men visiting an Indian restaurant (one of them for the first time) was repeatedly played on BBC Radio 1 and featured them live on several TV shows (including the BBC's Blue Peter) and was very popular at the time, but a three-week strike at the distributors (Phonogram Records) meant that the records never actually got to the shops and were not sold. The song was eventually re-released in 2006 as part of a collection of comedy/parody songs called Make Tea, Not War by the imaginary, but ill-fated and tragic, R.J. Wagsmith Band. Another song from the same album, "Chalk Dust", which was written for Roger Kitter who released it under the pseudonym "The Brat", did hit the top ten all over Europe. Walling has appeared in shows such as "The Smoking Room", "Coronation Street" and My Family.

Walling died on 29 June 2020, at home in Manchester.

== Filmography ==
Mike Walling appeared in the following TV shows and films:

- Just Liz, TV (1980)
- The Disappearance of Harry, TV (1982)
- Badger by Owl-Light, TV (1982)
- The Pirates of Penzance, TV (1983)
- Bootle Saddles, TV (1983)
- Scandalous, film (1984)
- Brush Strokes, TV (1986)
- Alfonso Bonzo, TV (1990)
- Billy Webb's Amazing Story, TV (1991)
- Harry's Mad, TV (1993)
- Last of the Summer Wine, TV (2001)

- Ep. – The Missing Bus of Mrs Avery

- Chaos and Cadavers, film (2003)
- The Smoking Room, TV (2004)

- Ep. – "Last Night a Graphic Designer Saved My Life"
- Ep. – "Quitters"
- Ep. – "1987"
- Ep. – "Happy Birthday"
- Ep. – "Feeding Time"

- Coronation Street, TV (2006)
- My Family, TV (2007)

- Ep. – "Abi Ever After"
- Ep. – "Once More with Feeling"
- Ep. – "Four Affairs and a Funeral"
- Ep. – "The Heart of Christmas"
- Ep. – "2039: A Christmas Oddity"
- Ep. – "Susan for a Bruisin'"

- Made in Romania, film (2008)
- Not Going Out, TV (2013)

- Ep. - "Rabbit"

- Citizen Khan, TV (2014)

- Ep. - "Farmer Khan

== Scriptwriter ==
He wrote or co-wrote scripts for the following comedy shows:

- Me and My Girl, TV, 1984
- Relative Strangers, TV, 1985
- A Small Problem, TV, 1987
- ChuckleVision, 1987

- Ep. - "Breakfast Telly"

- Valentine Park, TV, 1987
- Birds of a Feather, TV, 1989

- Ep. – "In at the Deep End"
- Ep. – "First-Time Caller"
- Ep. – "Suspicious Minds"

- Not with a Bang, TV, 1990

- Ep. – No.1.3
- Ep. – No.1.4
- Ep. – No.1.5
- Ep. – No.1.6
- Ep. – No.1.7

- The Brittas Empire, TV, 1991

- Ep. – "The Disappearing Act"
- Ep. – "Reviewing the Situation"
- Ep. – "Surviving Christmas"
- Ep. – "A Walk on the Wildside"
- Ep. – "Body Language"

- Trouble in Mind, TV, 1991
- A Prince Among Men, TV, 1997
