= Not with a Bang =

1990 British television series

- Genre: Situation comedy
- Written by: Tony Millan; Mike Walling
- Directed by: Robin Carr
- Starring: Mike Grady; Josie Lawrence; Ronald Pickup; Stephen Rea
- Theme music composer: Rod Argent; Peter Van Hooke
- Country of origin: United Kingdom
- Original language: English
- No. of series: 1
- No. of episodes: 7

Production
- Producer: Robin Carr
- Running time: 30 minutes
- Production company: LWT

Original release
- Network: ITV
- Release: 25 March – 6 May 1990

Not with a Bang is a British television sitcom produced by LWT for ITV in 1990. It ran for seven episodes, each 30 minutes long. The show was a dark science fiction comedy, focusing on the end of the human race on Earth. The title comes from the last line of T. S. Eliot's poem "The Hollow Men" "not with a bang, but a whimper"; The concept for the series originates from a self-contained 1986 Radio 4 afternoon play of the same title, from which Mike Grady was the only cast member to reprise his role in the television series.

== Premise ==
The pilot episode of Not with a Bang begins with an episode of the spoof science show The World Tomorrow where Judith Hann is presenting a story on how scientists have apparently isolated the hormone that causes aging in humans. The conical flask containing the chemical is then accidentally dropped on the floor and smashes. The hormone is released and the effect spreads almost instantly, annihilating virtually all human life on Earth, turning people into little piles of an ash-like compound, before dissipating harmlessly.

The show then follows the plight of the four human survivors – three male, one female – who survive due to various far-fetched reasons – for example being sealed in a sound-proof booth during a pub quiz when the agent strikes the vicinity. The four characters are united by chance about one year after the event, and set up a base of operations in a country cottage. They then spend the next six episodes looking for other survivors, adjusting to life after the end of the world, and deliberating over the repopulation of the human race.

The show relies heavily on a small cast of esoteric characters, including: rugby league fanatic Colin; everyman Brian, who comes closest to being the group's leader; and Graham and Janet, a bland couple who struggle over the issue of having children. Conversation between Graham and Janet frequently features Graham's reluctance and Janet's determination to have children, as well as Graham's extraordinarily low sperm count.

The pub name is never mentioned in the show. Although an interior quiz advert references the Red Lion in Episode 1, there is also a V for Versus above, as well as a faint H, suggesting they did not attempt to rename the pub, as in an earlier shot of the outside, the White Hart sign is visible. These shots are of the White Hart in the village of Bouth, Cumbria.

== Cast ==
- Mike Grady as Graham Wilkins
- Josie Lawrence as Janet Wilkins
- Ronald Pickup as Brian Appleyard
- Stephen Rea as Colin Garrity
- Judith Hann as herself

== See also ==
- Woops, a 1992 American sitcom with a similar theme.
- The Last Man on Earth, a 2015 American comedy with a similar theme.

== Reception ==
The Daily Mirror television critic Hilary Kingsley criticised the television series, writing, "Not to mince words, Not With A Bang is awful. It certainly comes with a whimper—mine—and four wimps, the nerdish characters who sit around misunderstanding each other each week. We're supposed to find it droll that the continuance of the human race rests with Janet, a prissy housewife and pot-holer (Josie Lawrence) and either her gormless loft-converter husband (Mike Grady) or one of the two other fluke survivors getting on each others' nerves. ... Josie-Lawrence can do 20 things funnier in one episode of Whose Line Is It Anyway."

In a positive review, James Green of The Stage stated, "It is funny, very funny at times, which is a help and as a saucy show with adult innuendoes has been given a 10. 5 pm network slot. ... Now that is an entirely novel kind of sit-com and for that thanks are due to writers Mike Walling and Tony Millan, and director-producer Robin Carr. In their own style of innuendo may they keep it up." The Evening Standard's Geoffrey Phillips wrote, "It's a doomsday comedy, faintly reminiscent of a funny version of the Seventies series Survivors, benefiting very considerably from the casting of Ronald Pickup and Stephen Rea. The arrival of Mike Grady and Josie Lawrence promises even better things to come."
