= Mike Grady (actor) =

British actor (born 1946)

- Born: Michael Grady; 6 February 1946 (age 80); Cheltenham, Gloucestershire, England
- Occupation: Actor
- Years active: 1967–present

Michael Grady (born 6 February 1946) is an English character actor. He is best known for his comedy roles in films and television, particularly as Ken Mills in Citizen Smith (1977–1980) and Barry Wilkinson in Last of the Summer Wine (1986–2010).

== Early life ==
Grady was born on 6 February 1946, in Cheltenham, Gloucestershire. He undertook classical training at the Bristol Old Vic Theatre School.

== Career ==
Grady's theatre career was extensive, including theatre roles at the Royal Shakespeare Company and London's Royal National Theatre, as well the West End, the Royal Court, the Bush, and the Soho Poly, plus many tours and pantomimes around the country.

His television roles have included Minder as Kev in the Series 1 episode, The Bengal Tiger, Steve Bracket in Rooms, Citizen Smith, as series regular, Ken Mills, Look and Read, Dr Ballantyne, Sweet Sixteen, 161 episodes of Last of the Summer Wine, playing Barry Wilkinson, husband of Glenda, Colin's Sandwich, Up the Garden Path, Not with a Bang. His film credits include Carry On Loving (1970), Up the Front (1972), Symptoms (1974), The Return of the Pink Panther (1975), opposite Peter Sellers, I'm Not Feeling Myself Tonight (1976), Britannia Hospital (1982), Bert Rigby, You're a Fool (1989) and Sherlock Holmes: A Game of Shadows (2011). He was also in the Wycliffe episode Slave of Duty. He also has starred in advertisements including a Pepsi advertisement from 1976.

A regular performer on radio, Grady played Rob Pengelly in Waggoners' Walk, a BBC Radio 2 soap opera. He has been involved in award-winning productions such as Christianity at Glacier for BBC Radio 3 and comedies Up the Garden Path, Dial M For Pizza, and Giles Wemmbley-Hogg Goes Off.

He continues work in the theatre and on television. In March 2023, Grady portrayed Clyde Taylor in an episode of the BBC soap opera Doctors.

== Filmography ==
=== Film ===
Year	Title	Role(s)	Notes
1970	Carry On Loving	Boy Lover	
1972	Up the Front	Newsboy	
1974	Symptoms	Nick	
1975	The Return of the Pink Panther	Bell Boy	
1976	I'm Not Feeling Myself Tonight	Boy Scout	
1979	The London Connection	Courier	
1979	The Prisoner of Zenda	Villager	
1983	The Pirates of Penzance	Pirate	
1989	Bert Rigby, You're a Fool	Mick O'Grady	
2011	Sherlock Holmes: A Game of Shadows	Train Conductor	
2011	Much Ado About Nothing	Verges	
2013	King of the Railway	Sir Robert Norramby	Voice
2014	Tale of the Brave	Sir Robert Norramby	Voice

=== Television ===
Year	Title	Role(s)	Notes
1969	Doctor in the House	Various	3 episodes
1970	Scene	Dave	Episode: "Hero in the Dust"
1971	Public Eye	Ted	Episode: "The Beater and the Game"
1971	The Fenn Street Gang	Batch	2 episodes
1971	Suspicion	Brian McGrath	Episode: "No Case to Answer"
1972	Tightrope	Spud	6 episodes
1972	In for a Penny	Wol	Episode: "Dan and the U.X.B."
1973	Emmerdale	Robin	2 episodes
1973	Public Eye	Freddie	Episode: "Home and Away"
1973	Look and Read	Denis Beasley	Episode: "Joe and the Sheep Rustlers"
1973	Once Upon A Time	Tibbs	Episode: "Sister Alice"
1973	Doctor in Charge	Spud	Episode: "In Place of Strife"
1973–1974	The Kids from 47A	Andy	3 episodes
1974	Second City Firsts	Derry	Episode: "Sunday Tea"
1975	Coronation Street	Les Grimes	Episode: #1.1546
1975–1976	My Brother's Keeper	Trevor Gribbin	2 episodes
1976	The Howerd Confessions	Kaufman	episode 2
1977–80	Citizen Smith	Ken Mills	All 30 episodes
1979	Minder	Kev	Episode: "The Bengal Tiger"
1979	Play for Today	Chas	Episode: "Instant Enlightenment Including VAT"
1983	Sweet Sixteen	Dr. Ballentine	5 episodes
1984-1987	Chish and Fips	Mr Fisher	All 16 episodes
1986	Troubles and Strife	Christopher	5 episodes
1986–1990, 1996–2010	Last of the Summer Wine	Barry Wilkinson	161 episodes
1988–1990	Colin's Sandwich	Des	8 episodes
1990	Not with a Bang	Graham Wilkins	All 7 episodes
1992	An Ungentlemanly Act	Patrick Watts	TV film
1990–93	Up the Garden Path	Dick Barnes	All 18 episodes
1996	Wycliffe	Michael Morva	Episode: "Slave of Duty"
1996	The Willows in Winter	Pilot	TV film
1997	As Time Goes By	Herald	Episode: "The Dinner Party"
2001	Bernard's Watch	Dr. Stark	6 episodes
2010-2015	Doctors	Arthur Bruin/Ted Hicks	2 episodes
2011	Skins	Vicar	Episode: "Everyone"
2011	Holby City	Colin Campbell	Episode: "Tunnel Vision"
2013–2020	Thomas & Friends	Sir Robert Norramby	Voice; 20 episodes
2017	The Dumping Ground	Ralph	Episode: "Vox Populi"
2017	Casualty	Reg Cutler	Episode: #32.4
2018	Midsomer Murders	Les Morrison	Episode: "Send in the Clowns"
2018	Vanity Fair	Horrocks	3 episodes
2019	Endeavour	Ernest Croglin	Episode: "Pylon"
2019	Shakespeare & Hathaway: Private Investigators	Adam Oldknow	Episode: "The Envious Court"
2023	Doctors	Clyde Taylor	Episode: "As One Door Closes... A Window Opens"
