= Paul Luty =

British professional wrestler and actor (1932 – 1985)

- Born: Philip Graham Luty; 5 May 1932; Leeds, West Riding of Yorkshire, England
- Died: 12 January 1985 (aged 52); Leeds, West Yorkshire, England
- Occupations: Actor, Wrestler
- Years active: 1969 - 1985

Paul Graham Luty (5 May 1932 – 12 January 1985) was an English wrestler who later became a film and television actor.

In 1973 Luty played window cleaner, Bert Henshaw on Coronation Street. Other television credits include Kisses at Fifty, Love Thy Neighbour (as Nobby Garside), A Sharp Intake of Breath, Emmerdale (Sid Pickles), All Creatures Great and Small (as Bert Sharpe), Rosie (Chief Inspector Dunwoody), In Loving Memory (Tom Wrigley), Porridge (Chalky) and Dixon of Dock Green - Episode "Alice" (1976) (Alfie Tredwin).

== Film credits ==
Year	Title	Role	Notes
1970	The Railway Children	Malcolm	Uncredited
1972	For the Love of Ada	Bert	Uncredited
1972	Play for Today	Terry	Episode: Kisses at Fifty
1972	Burke & Hare	Cruncher	
1973	Father, Dear Father	Milkman	
1974	Juggernaut	Clerk	
1976	Last of the Summer Wine	Big Malcolm Simmonite	
1977	The Black Panther	Night Watchman	
1978	The Water Babies	Sladd / Voice of Claude the Swordfish	
1979	Porridge	Chalky	
1979	Yanks	Ted the Pub Landlord	
1981	4D Special Agents	Steve's grandfather	
1983	The Dresser	Stallkeeper	

== Television ==
Year	Title	Role	Notes
1980	Leave it to Charlie	Wrestler	Episode: "The World of Mr. Wellbeloved"
