= Dial M For Pizza =

Radio sketch show broadcast by the BBC

Dial M for Pizza is a sketch show broadcast on BBC Radio 4 in two series in 1987 and 1988, written by Ian Brown and James Hendrie.

The series starred Robert Bathurst, Brenda Blethyn, Mike Grady and Jonathan Kydd. Other performers on the show included Jim Broadbent, Janine Duvitski, Felicity Montagu, Enn Reitel and Morwenna Banks.

Both series were produced and directed by David Tyler
