= Ashenden (TV series) =

- Genre: Drama; Espionage
- Based on: Ashenden: Or the British Agent by W. Somerset Maugham
- Written by: David Pirie
- Directed by: Christopher Morahan
- Starring: Alex Jennings; Joss Ackland; Ian Bannen; Jason Isaacs
- Theme music composer: Stephen Oliver
- Composer: Carl Davis
- Country of origin: United Kingdom
- Original language: English
- No. of series: 1
- No. of episodes: 4

Production
- Executive producer: Michael Wearing
- Producers: Joe Knatchbull; Julian Hope
- Cinematography: Chris Seager
- Editor: Dave King
- Running time: 53 minutes
- Production company: Kelso Films for BBC

Original release
- Network: BBC1
- Release: 17 November – 8 December 1991

Ashenden is a British four-part TV series based on the 1927 spy novel, Ashenden: Or the British Agent, by W. Somerset Maugham, that aired on BBC1 from 17 November to 8 December 1991, directed by Christopher Morahan, with Alex Jennings in the title role, Joss Ackland as Cumming, Ian Bannen as 'R' and Jason Isaacs as Andrew Lehman.

Guest actors included Harriet Walter as Giulia Lazzari in the first episode, Alan Bennett as Grantly Caypor in the second, René Auberjonois as John Quincy Harrington in the third, with Elizabeth McGovern as Aileen Sommerville and Alfred Molina as Carmona, the titular character, in the final story.

A framing device at the start of each episode shows progressively more of an aged Ashenden living in France in the mid-1960s, reacting adversely to a piece of music on the radio. The final episode – which gives the context to this section – closes with a return to this "future" setting.

The series was filmed in 13 weeks on location in Yugoslavia and was completed in June 1991, immediately prior to the outbreak of the Ten-Day War.

== Cast ==
- Alex Jennings as John Ashenden
- Joss Ackland as Cumming
- Ian Bannen as 'R'
- Jason Isaacs as Andrew Lehman
- Sarah Bullen as 'R's secretary
- Fiona Mollison as Sarah
- Jane Hollowood as Maid
- Peter Stockbridge as Roberts
- Harriet Walter as Giulia Lazzari
- Alan Bennett as Grantly Caypor
- René Auberjonois as John Quincy Harrington
- Elizabeth McGovern as Aileen Sommerville
- Alfred Molina as Carmona

== Episodes ==
1. The Dark Woman (17 November 1991)
2. The Traitor (24 November 1991)
3. Mr Harrington's Washing (1 December 1991)
4. The Hairless Mexican (8 December 1991)
