= Alfonso Bonzo =

- Created by: Andrew Davies
- Starring: Alex Jennings; Mike Walling
- Country of origin: United Kingdom
- Original language: English
- No. of series: 1
- No. of episodes: 6

Production
- Running time: 25mins

Original release
- Network: BBC1
- Release: 4 January – 8 February 1990

First edition (publ. Methuen)

Alfonso Bonzo is a 1986 British children's book by Andrew Davies. A television adaptation was broadcast on BBC 1 starring Alex Jennings as Alfonso Bonzo and Scott Riley as Billy Webb.

Billy Webb is a young boy who likes to swap things with his schoolmates. He meets Alfonso Bonzo, an "Italian exchange student" who also has a talent for swapping things (thus his self-description: he is an Italian student who exchanges things). Alfonso offers Billy a variety of temporary swaps to demonstrate his abilities: Billy's boring old dog for a greyhound that does ballet, the wonky Webb family television for a new model with a button that lets the viewer become part of the action, Billy's battered schoolbag full of unfinished homework for a brand new schoolbag containing a file folder that magically produces finished homework, but, each swap has disadvantages as well as advantages, and Alfonso Bonzo cuts an increasingly sinister figure as he leads up to one last swap, this one for keeps.

The television series later had a spinoff called Billy Webb's Amazing Story, featuring Billy's further (non-Alfonso-related) adventures, broadcast in 1991.

== Cast ==
- Scott Riley as Billy Webb
- Alex Jennings as Alfonso Bonzo
- Mike Walling as Trevor Trotman
- Susan Porrett as Mrs. Webb
- Fleur Taylor as Linda Webb
- Gil Brailey as Mrs. Peasgood
- Brian Hall as Mr. Webb
