= Lori Wells =

English actress and singer (born 1942)

- Born: Lorraine A Burns
- Other names: Lori Wells Keefe; Lori Keefe
- Occupations: Actress, singer
- Years active: 1970–present
- Television: Get Some In!

Signature
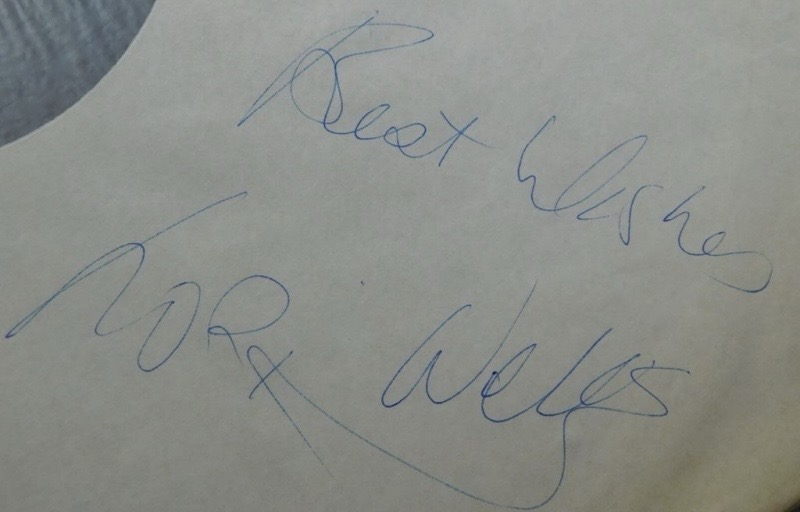

Lorraine A Keefe, known professionally as Lori Wells, is an English actress and singer. She is best known for her role of Alice Marsh in the ITV sitcom Get Some In! (1975–1978).

== Career ==
Wells made her television debut in 1970. She performed as a singer, with The Brothers, on the BBC light entertainment programme, The Good Old Days. Her debut album, I Gotcha!, was self-released and consists of 16 songs. Mike Berry, The Peter Husband Sound, Mike Ibbetson, her former husband Jack Wells, and Brian Ibbetson are credited on the album.

Wells portrayed Brenda, a check-out assistant at Harrison's Supermarket, for one episode of the ITV soap opera Coronation Street, in 1972.

Wells was praised for her performance as Sandra, the battleaxe daughter, in Kisses at Fifty, a 1973 episode of the BBC television anthology drama series Play for Today. Kisses at Fifty was repeated on BBC Two in 1993, as part of the BBC One anthology series The Wednesday Play, and again in 2024. She portrayed Sadie in Leeds United!, in 1974.

Wells portrayed Brenda in the BBC police procedural series Z-Cars, in an episode, "Bowman", broadcast in 1973.

Wells portrayed Alice Marsh in the ITV sitcom Get Some In! from 1975 to 1978. The series focused on National service life in the Royal Air Force. Her character, Alice, is constantly irritated by her husband's lack of advancement in the RAF, but she is a kind-hearted woman and is good to the recruits, much to the irritation of Corporal Percy Marsh (Tony Selby). Alice left her husband during the fourth series, only to return to him in the end. The series was written by [John] Esmonde and [Bob] Larbey, regularly attracted 15 million viewers, and was one of a number of shows from that decade to have never been repeated.

Wells made her radio debut in the BBC Radio 2 programme, Variety Club, in 1979.

Wells made a second appearance in Coronation Street, when she portrayed Pauline Jarvis, a customer of Ray Langton's building firm, for two episodes in 1982.

Wells made her final appearance in Coronation Street, when she portrayed Kath Goodwin, a relief barmaid at the Rovers Return Inn, for six episodes in 1984. She was credited as Lori Wells Keefe in this role.

Wells portrayed Jean Denton in the BBC One police procedural drama series Juliet Bravo. The episode, "Reasons for Leaving", was broadcast in 1985.

Wells appeared as herself in the 1991 television film, Classic Coronation Street.

Wells portrayed Belle in the BBC sitcom Last of the Summer Wine. The episode, "Magic and the Morris Minor", was broadcast in 2000.

Wells voiced Shirley in the BBC Radio 4 radio drama Afternoon Play: Coming down the Mountain as part of Drama.

== Filmography ==
Year	Title	Role	Notes	Ref.
1970	The Good Old Days	Performer	Episode: "Episode #18.6"	
1972, 1975, 1984	Coronation Street	Brenda, Pauline Jarvis, Kath Goodwin	9 episodes, credited as Lori Wells Keefe in 1984	
1973	Z-Cars	Brenda	Episode: "Bowman"	
1973–1974	Play for Today	Sandra, Sadie	2 episodes	
1975	Couples	Jean	4 episodes	
1975–1978	Get Some In!	Alice Marsh	21 episodes	
1975	The ITV Play	Betty Pratt	Episode: "A House in Regent Place: Mrs Tycoon"	
1978	Oh No It's Selwyn Froggitt	Cafe Cashier	2 episodes	
1979	Variety Club		BBC Radio 2	
1979	Chalk and Cheese	Dot	Episode: "Strangers in the Night"	
1979, 1982, 1984	In Loving Memory	Daisy Plummer, Gladys, Annie Dawson	3 episodes, credited as Lori Wells Keefe on "Cuckoo in the Nest"	
1981	The Gaffer	Rose	Episode: "The Trouble with Women"	
1982	Young at Heart	Barmaid	Episode: "On the Move"	
1983	The Dresser	Barmaid		
1985	Them and Us	Mrs. Cartwright	Episode: "Wagging It"	
1985	Juliet Bravo	Jean Denton	Episode: "Reason for Leaving", credited as Lori Wells Keefe	
1991	Classic Coronation Street	Herself	Television film	
1993	The Wednesday Play	Sandra	Episode: "Kisses at Fifty"	
1995	Heartbeat	Mrs. Clegg	Episode: "Toss Up"	
2000	Last of the Summer Wine	Belle	Episode: "Magic and the Morris Minor"	
2000	Between Two Women	Mrs Britchenor		
2003	Drama	Shirley (voice)	Episode: "Afternoon Play: Coming down the Mountain"	
