= Billy Webb's Amazing Story =

English mini TV series

- Created by: Steve Attridge
- Starring: Brian Hall; Mike Walling
- Country of origin: United Kingdom
- Original language: English
- No. of series: 1
- No. of episodes: 6

Production
- Running time: 25mins

Original release
- Network: CBBC
- Release: 3 January – 7 February 1991

Billy Webb's Amazing Story is a 1991 CBBC series by Steve Attridge, continuing the story of Billy Webb, a character in the book the series was based on, Alfonso Bonzo by Andrew Davies.

== Plot ==
Each episode begins with Billy recounting the strange happenings he has encountered to journalist Trevor Trotman. Billy has been having trouble with certain items he acquires from strange people, including pancake mixture that gives his whole class hiccups, a bike which flies, and a strange watch. Billy and Trevor soon discover the man is the same person, who appears every time he reads a certain book. They eventually find out how to stop him and, inevitably, get rid of him. The villain is played by a different actor in each episode.

== Production ==
The series was written by Steve Attridge, who later wrote The Boot Street Band with Andrew Davies, and who then went on to write many television series including The Queen's Nose, as well as the film Guy X.

== Ratings (CBBC Channel) ==
Sunday 10 March 2002- 50,000
