= Tony Millan =

British actor and scriptwriter

Anthony Millan, known professionally as Tony Millan, is a British character actor and television comedy scriptwriter. Millan appeared in numerous roles, predominantly in sitcoms and drama series on British television throughout the 1980s and 1990s.

== Early life ==
Millan was born in Edmonton, London, England in 1946. He was educated in London and trained there as an actor.

== Career ==
Millan has had a career in British television spanning several decades.

== Personal life ==
Millan married Marilyn J Honig in 1971 in London. The marriage produced three children.

== Selected filmography ==
- The Girls of Slender Means (3 episodes, 1975) as Ernest Claymore
- Holding On (1977) as officer in trench
- Citizen Smith (1977–1980) as Tucker
- Mixed Blessings (1980) as Giovanni
- Holding the Fort (1980) as Daniel
- L for Lester (3 episodes, 1982) as Sid
- Lame Ducks (series 1 and 2, 1984–1985) as Maurice
- Roll Over Beethoven (1985) as waiter
- The Lenny Henry Show (2 episodes, 1985)
- Sweet Sixteen (2 episodes, 1986) as Tom Sherrin
- Hot Metal (series 2, episode 3, 1988) as peasant
- Alexei Sayle's Stuff (1988–1991) multiple roles
- Close To Home (1990) as Mr Gill
- May to December as Mr Kennedy (1990)
- On The Up (1991) as Chalky Smith
- The Brittas Empire (1991) as Ken Owen
- One Foot in the Grave (1992) as Jack Aylesbury
- As Time Goes By (1992) as gorillagram
- If You See God, Tell Him (1993) as Leonard Ewbank
- The Bill (1993) as Mr Linnell
- Hale and Pace (TV series) (1993)
- Casualty (series nine, 1994) as George a paramedic
- Nelson's Column (series 1, episode 4, 1994) as theatre manager
- Grange Hill (1 episode, 1995) as Mr Dennis
- Jack and Jeremy's Real Lives (1996)
- Last of the Summer Wine (1 episode, 1997) as Gunnie
- Birds of a Feather (series 7, 1997) as the hotel manager
- Goodnight Sweetheart (series 6, 1999) as Kenneth
- High Hopes (2 episodes, 2006) as Renfield

== Writing credits ==
- ChuckleVision (series 1 and series 16)
- A Prince Among Men (series 1)
- Birds of a Feather (3 episodes)
- Not with a Bang (entire series)
- The Brittas Empire (5 episodes)

== Voice acting credits ==
- Big Finish, Dr Who series audio books (several roles)
