= Sweet Sixteen (TV series) =

1983 British television series

- Opening titles of Sweet Sixteen
- Created by: Douglas Watkinson
- Starring: Penelope Keith; Christopher Villiers; Joan Blackham; Mike Grady; Matthew Solon; Victor Spinetti
- Country of origin: United Kingdom
- No. of series: 1
- No. of episodes: 6

Production
- Running time: 30 minutes

Original release
- Network: BBC1
- Release: 16 October – 20 November 1983

Sweet Sixteen is a British sitcom that aired on BBC1 in 1983. It stars Penelope Keith and was written by Douglas Watkinson and directed and produced by Gareth Gwenlan.

== Plot ==
Helen Morgan (nee Carrington and formerly Walker) is the no-nonsense and independent 41-year-old head of a successful local building firm known as Carrington and Daughter, founded by her late father (John Carrington) and leads a rather affluent lifestyle with her luxury Jaguar and all the trappings. However, her life is turned upside down when she falls in love with Peter Morgan, her young, attractive and recently recruited architect who is 16 years younger than she. After a torrid beginning, time softens and he also falls in love with her after she has become pregnant with his child, despite already having a 19-year-old son James (Jimmy) Walker. Jimmy is a history student from her previous marriage to Mr. Walker (deceased). After the two marry in a registrars office, they move into a cozy property that Helen has sourced as part of her business dealings (Church Farm) through Hartshorn Jr. who is her dopey agent. He wants nothing more than to be liked by her so after buying that and a 4ac development site known as "Askett Field" which is also part of the story. The story remained largely unresolved as low viewing figures meant a second series was not commissioned and the series was never repeated on any BBC channel.

== Cast ==
- Penelope Keith – Helen Walker
- Christopher Villiers – Peter Morgan
- John Rapley – Arthur Poole – Helen's building supervisor
- Sheila Fay – Millie Poole – Arthur's wife and the Morgan's Housekeeper
- Joan Blackham – Jane – Helen's secretary
- Mike Grady – Dr Ballantine – local GP
- Matthew Solon – James Walker – James (Jimmy) Walker – Helen's son (b.1964)
- Victor Spinetti – Ken Green – Helen's accountant
- David Neville – Tony Hartshorn – Helen's estate agent
- Richard E. Grant – Anton

== Episodes ==
1. Episode One (16 October 1983)
2. Episode Two (23 October 1983)
3. Episode Three (30 October 1983)
4. Episode Four (6 November 1983)
5. Episode Five (13 November 1983)
6. Episode Six (20 November 1983)
