= List of Citizen Smith episodes =

Citizen Smith is a British sitcom that aired on BBC One between 12 April 1977 and 31 December 1980. A total of 30 episodes were aired.

The pilot episode aired on 12 April 1977. The first series of eight episodes aired from 3 November to 15 December 1977 (apart from a Christmas special aired on 22 December 1977). The second series, of six episodes, was scheduled to air from 1 December 1978 to 5 January 1979, but the fifth episode was postponed due to industrial action, eventually being broadcast on 16 August 1979. The third series, of seven episodes, began on 20 September 1979 and ended on 1 November. The fourth and final series consisted of seven episodes, beginning on 23 May 1980 and ended on 4 July 1980.

The 1980 Christmas special is 30 minutes long and aired on 31 December 1980. All episodes were originally shown on BBC One.

== Series overview ==
Series	Episodes	Originally released	
Series	Episodes	First released	Last released
Pilot		12 April 1977	
1	7	3 November 1977	15 December 1977
1977 Christmas Special		22 December 1977	
2	6	1 December 1978	16 August 1979
3	7	20 September 1979	1 November 1979
4	7	23 May 1980	4 July 1980
1980 Christmas Special		31 December 1980	

== Episodes ==
=== Pilot (1977) ===
No.	Title	Original release date	Prod. code
1	"Citizen Smith"	12 April 1977	NMYJ376N
In this pilot for the series we meet the Tooting Popular Front and its leader, Wolfie Smith.

=== Series 1 (1977) ===
No.	Title	Original release date	Prod. code
2	"Crocodile Tears"	3 November 1977	LLCD876H
Once again we meet the Tooting Popular Front and its leader, Wolfie Smith in this straight forward remake of the Pilot (but with Peter Vaughan as Dad instead of Artro Morris.)
3	"Guess Who's Coming to Dinner"	10 November 1977	LLCD877B
When Wolfie comes around for dinner, trouble isn’t far behind.
4	"Abide with Me"	17 November 1977	LLC1521K
Will Wolfie be allowed to move in upstairs or will he have to remain on the streets?
5	"The Weekend"	24 November 1977	LLCG917T
When Wolfie takes Shirley away for the weekend, her dad isn’t best pleased.
6	"The Hostage"	1 December 1977	LLC1523Y
A kidnap plan goes wrong when they kidnap the wrong person (Harry Fenning instead of the newly elected local MP).
7	"The Path of True Love"	8 December 1977	LLC1524S
Wolfie finds himself a new girlfriend when he spots Shirley with another man.
8	"But Is It Art?"	15 December 1977	LLC1525L
When Ken brings a paving slab home, Wolfie calls it anything but art.

=== Christmas Special (1977) ===
No.	Title	Original release date	Prod. code
9	"A Story for Christmas"	22 December 1977	LEGR471A
It's Christmas time and Wolfie, Ken and Tucker are struggling for money to buy presents, so Ken suggests that he tries praying to God. It seems to work and they have a lot of luck with stamps – well at least they think they do!

=== Series 2 (1978–79) ===
No.	Title	Original release date	Prod. code
10	"Speed's Return"	1 December 1978	LLCY432E
Speed is being released from prison. Wolfie sees Speed's girlfriend Desiree outside a Hospital at heading for a maternity/gynaecology clinic, and tells Shirley and Ken about it, but Charlie and Florence overhear them talking and think that Shirley is pregnant.
11	"Rebel Without a Pause"	8 December 1978	LLC1549W
When Shirley's dad is made redundant, Wolfie decides to have a demonstration outside the factory gates.
12	"The Tooting Connection"	15 December 1978	LLC1551J
Some stereos have been stolen from Charlie's factory, and Wolfie just happens to know where they are.
13	"Working Class Hero"	29 December 1978	LLCY435L
When Wolfie is holding a Right to Work protest at the Labour Exchange, he gets a job, but he can't say no or his benefits will be stopped. But, when he actually goes to work he is shocked to see that Charlie is his new boss! Originally scheduled for broadcast on 22 December 1978, but rescheduled due to industrial action.
14	"Rock Bottom"	5 January 1979	LLC1554R
Wolfie tries to get into the pop world by going for an audition.
15	"Spanish Fly"	16 August 1979	LLC1554R
Wolfie gets an offer of support from Jose, a brother from Spain who will provide Bilbao Liberation Movement soldiers to help Wolfie take control of Tooting. This episode has the last appearances by Peter Vaughan as Dad and Cheryl Hall as Shirley. Originally scheduled for broadcast on 29 December 1978, its place was taken by "Working Class Hero" and it eventually aired the following summer.

=== Series 3 (1979) ===
No.	Title	Original release date	Prod. code
16	"Don't Look Down"	20 September 1979	LLCA721R
When Shirley takes a job in Rimini, Wolfie threatens to throw himself off the roof of the pub and he has a heart-to-heart interrogation with a policeman named Brian Tofkin (This episode has Tony Steedman making his first appearance as Dad).
17	"Only Fools and Horses"	27 September 1979	LLCA725S
Wolfie and the gang try to lobby a local council meeting but it all goes wrong and they end up taking over a lift instead.
18	"The Big Job"	4 October 1979	LLCA722K
Ken is shocked when Wolfie decides to turn to crime to get some money for the cause.
19	"Tofkin's Revenge"	11 October 1979	LLCA726L
Inspector Tofkin asks for help from Wolfie and the Front to get his own back on his cousin Harry Fenning.
20	"We Shall Not Be Moved"	18 October 1979	LLCA723E
When Dad throws Wolfie and Ken out from their home, they sneak back in later as squatters.
21	"The Party's Over"	25 October 1979	LLCA724Y
Wolfie and the Johnsons get invited to a special party by Wolfie's new girlfriend. (This episode has the last appearance of Stephen Greif as Harry Fenning and his two "foster children".)
22	"The Glorious Day"	1 November 1979	TBA
Ex-Territorial Army man Speed "finds" a Scorpion Tank and, along with Wolfie and the gang, eventually drives it to Westminster.

=== Series 4 (1980) ===
No.	Title	Original release date	Prod. code
23	"Bigger Than Guy Fawkes"	23 May 1980	TBA
After the failure of their coup, Wolfie and the gang are stuck in jail. (Valerie Singleton appears as a BBC reporter who interviews Wolfie.)
24	"Changes"	30 May 1980	LLCB352H
Wolfie and the gang are released from prison and notice that Tooting has changed a lot, so Wolfie thinks of a plan to try to change things back to normal.
25	"The Final Try"	6 June 1980	LLCB353B
Wolfie plans to try to disrupt a proposed tour of the UK by a multi-racial rugby team from South Africa.
26	"The Letter of the Law"	13 June 1980	LLCB354W
Wolfie turns up for jury duty and finds out that the trial is for Ronnie Lynch.
27	"Prisoners"	20 June 1980	LLCB355P
When some unexpected visitors call at the house, it looks like everyone will have a night that they won't forget in a hurry.
28	"Casablanca Was Never Like This"	27 June 1980	LLCB356J
The Tooting Popular Front hire a private detective to prove that Speed is innocent of the crime that he has been accused of committing; unfortunately the detective in question, Dick Diamond, is in fact Tofkin.
29	"Sweet Sorrow"	4 July 1980	LLCB357D
Trying to save Tooting that he loves gets Wolfie in a lot of trouble.

=== Christmas Special (1980) ===
No.	Title	Original release date	Prod. code
30	"Buon Natale"	31 December 1980	LLCB358X
Ken and Wolfie take a trip over to Italy for the Christmas holidays.
