= Fragments of Him =

Indie video game

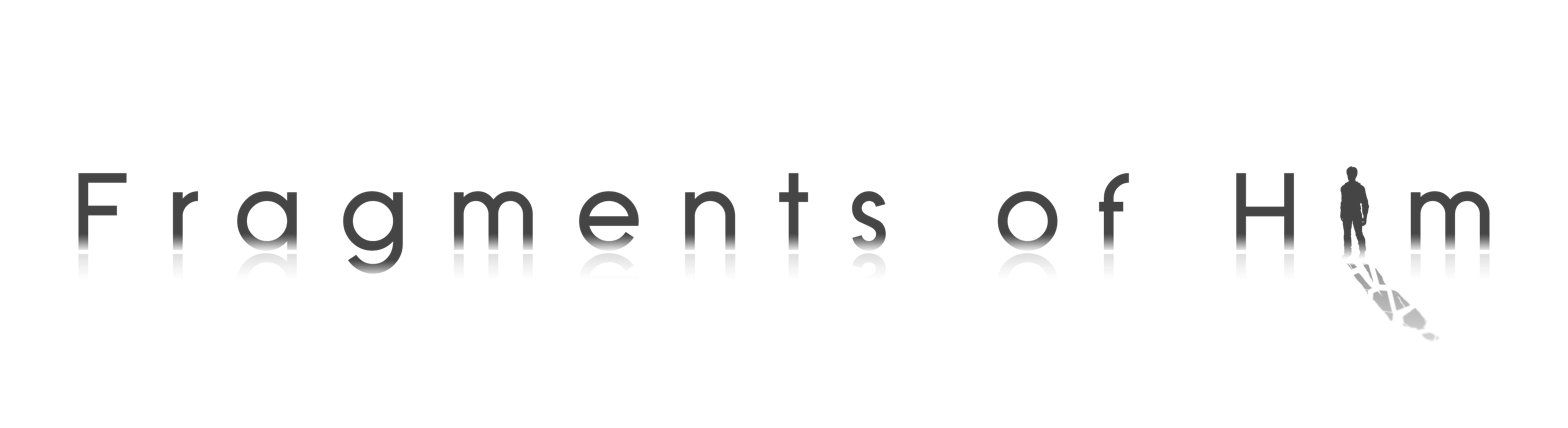
- Developer: Sassybot
- Publisher: Sassybot
- Engine: Unity
- Platforms: Windows; Xbox One; PlayStation 4
- Release: Windows; May 3, 2016; Xbox One; June 1, 2016; PlayStation 4; September 26, 2017
- Genre: Casual
- Mode: Single-player

Fragments of Him is a video game developed and published by Sassybot and released for Microsoft Windows and Xbox One on 3 May 2016 and 1 June 2016, respectively. The PlayStation 4 version was released on 26 September 2017.

The gameplay in Fragments of Him is based on the life and death of Will, a man who dies early in the game. The player controls four characters throughout the game; Will, his ex-girlfriend, his boyfriend at the time when he died, and his grandmother. As the game progresses, it becomes apparent that the story is not only based on Will's life, but also on those of the other characters, and how they cope with his death. The game relies heavily on its narrative which, although the player controls the game in the first-person, is described by the developer as being viewed in a second-person perspective, i.e. where the player is not directly controlling a character but instead indicates what the characters should interact with next.

Both versions of the game received mixed reviews. Reviewers praised its narrative, but criticized its gameplay as repetitive and sometimes tedious; some felt the game would have worked better as a short film or an audio drama.

== Gameplay ==
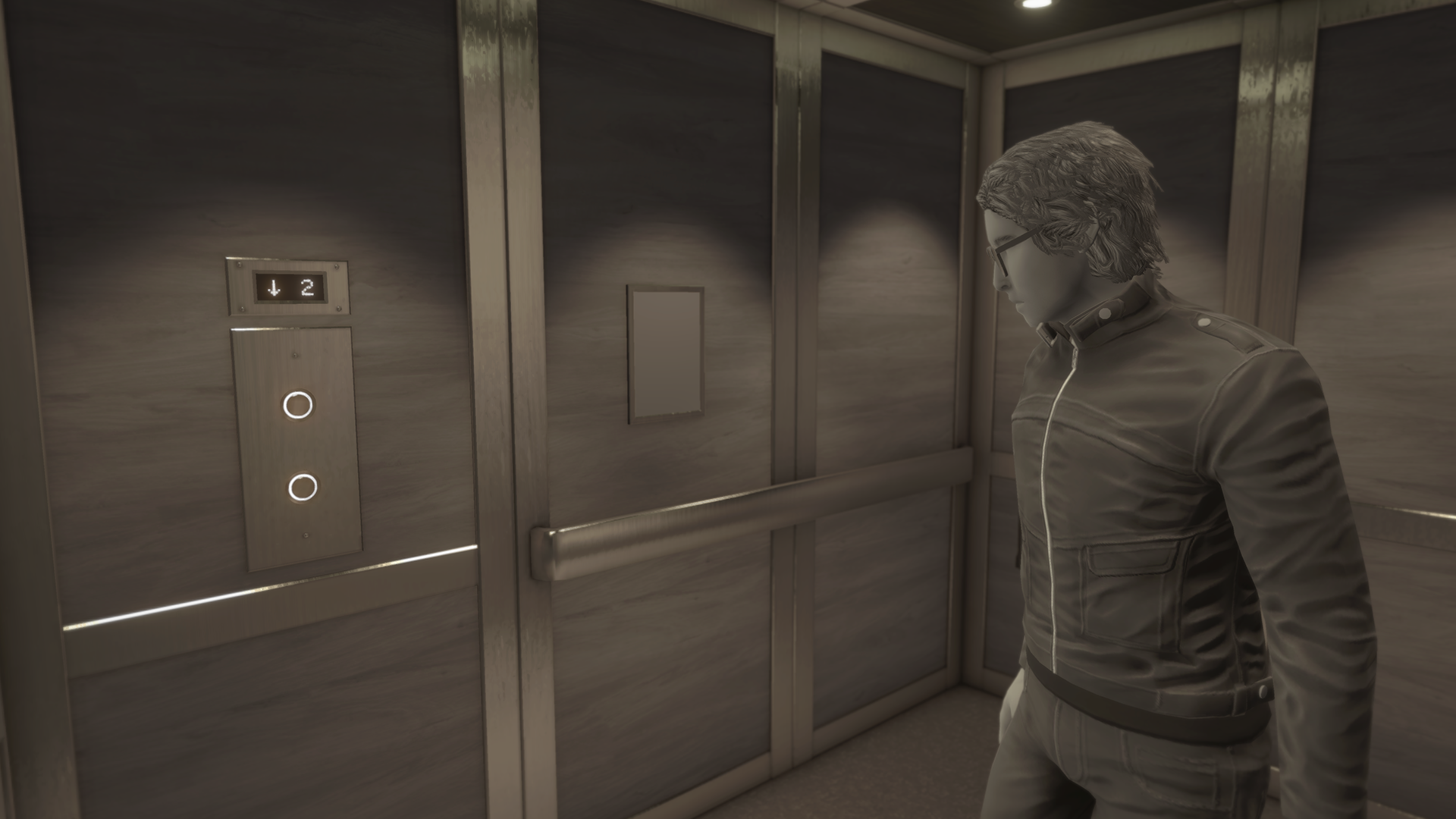
Will standing in an elevator

Fragments of Him is a first-person narrative-based video game set around the death of a bisexual man named Will. The player controls four characters, each of whom was connected to Will during his lifetime. The characters consist of: Will, who dies in a car crash early in the game; Sarah, Will's ex-girlfriend; Harry, Will's boyfriend at the time of his death; and Mary, Will's grandmother. The gameplay has the player character walk around the world, with the player triggering snippets of narration by clicking on highlighted objects. When interacting with non-player characters, clicking on them will sometimes result in them disappearing and reappearing in a different location to give the impression of them walking.

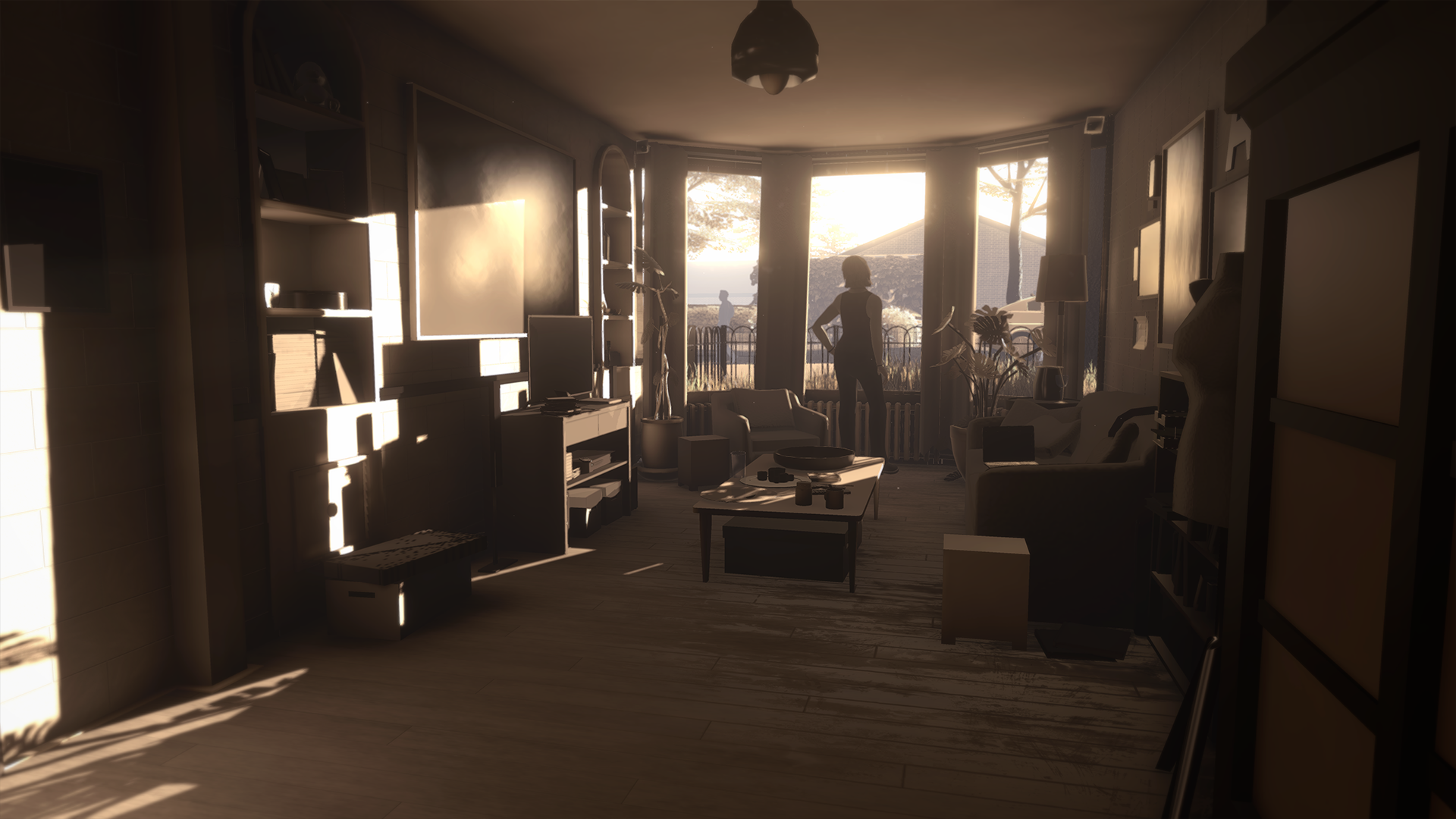
One of the living rooms

As the player progresses through the game, the perspective changes from Will's, to Sarah's, to Mary's and finally to Harry's. Players passively select whether they see Sarah's or Mary's story first through a hidden choice (which room they walk into first early in the game). It becomes apparent that the story is not only based on Will's life, but also those of other characters and how they cope with his death. During Sarah's portrayal she says "Let me set the scene..." and during this part of the game the player clicks on objects that slowly turn the setting into a pub. After a few pieces of dialogue, the player clicks again to make it all disappear. During Harry's section, the player clicks on objects that remind Harry of Will. In some parts of the game, the player clicks on other characters to make them move forward, suggesting the idea of snapshots based on their memories. Once the player has clicked on enough objects, a meter becomes full and that triggers the next part of the game.

== Development and release ==
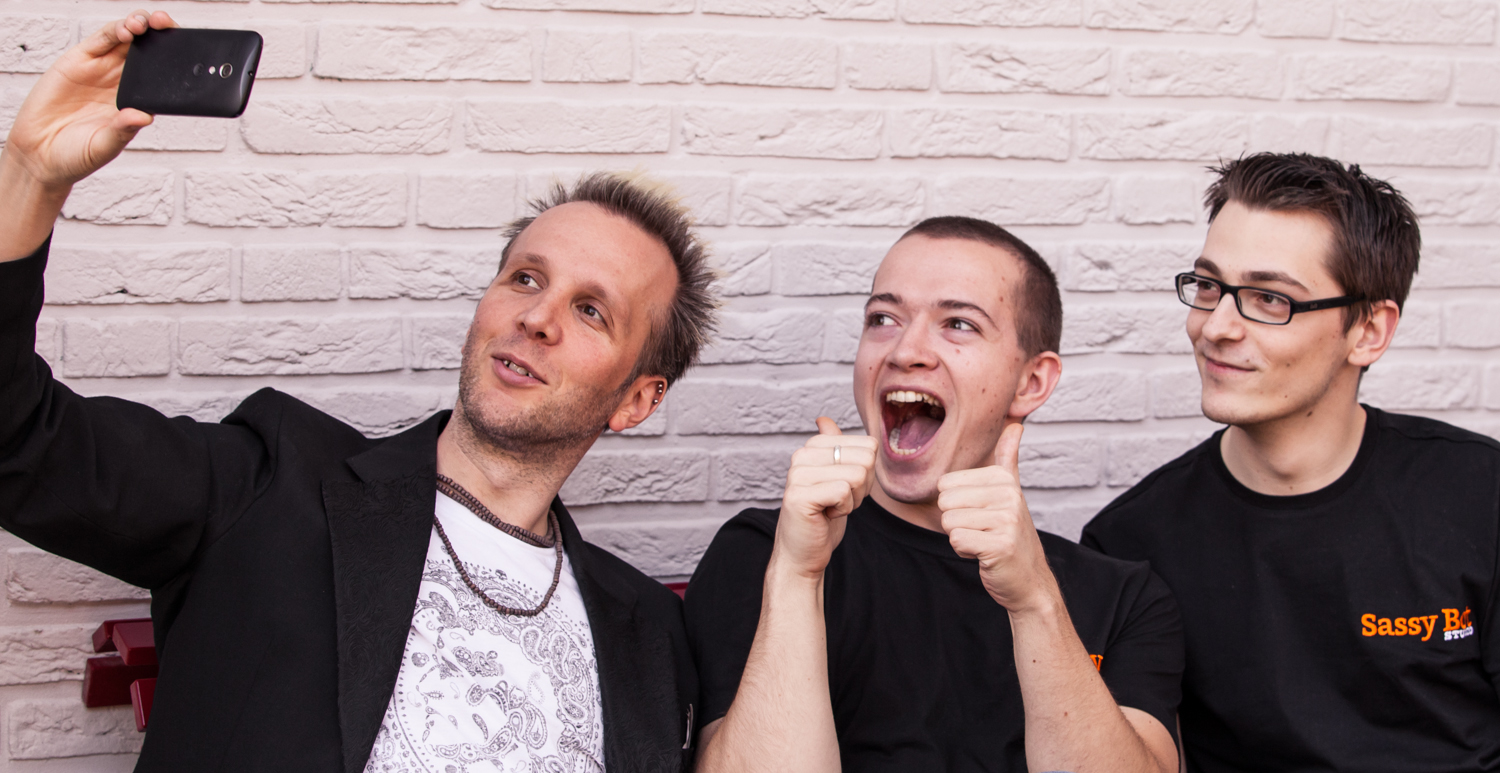
The development team

Fragments of Him stemmed from an idea developed at a game jam called the Ludum Dare. The game originally had players removing objects while the main character became more and more depressed. Mata Haggis, one of the developers of Fragments of Him, told the Rock, Paper, Shotgun blog that in the final version there would be more mechanics than just removing objects. He said that there would be some choices to be made, and that the story would branch off a little from the choices. The prototype of the game focused only on the boyfriend, while the full version was to include four different character perspectives. He described the gameplay style as a mix of Heavy Rain and Gone Home. Haggis told Nathan Grayson of the Kotaku blog that many of the objects in the game, such as hotels and parks, were based on his real-life experiences of when he lost a friend.

The game was released on the web gaming portal Kongregate in 2013. In December 2013, the game received funding from Mediafonds, a Dutch organisation. During the 2015 GaymerX in San Jose, California, the video game was demoed. About three years after the release of the original prototype, the full game, which was developed and published by Sassybot, a three-man indie game studio in the Netherlands, was released on 3 May 2016 for Microsoft Windows and 1 June 2016 for Xbox One, with the PlayStation 4 version released 26 September 2017. The developers tested and demoed the game during the 2016 Game Developers Conference and said that they experienced people crying while playing the game at their booth and that this was the reaction for which they had hoped.

== Reception ==
Reception

Aggregate score
Aggregator	Score
Metacritic	PC: 69/100; XONE: 73/100

Review scores
Publication	Score
Destructoid	4/10
Eurogamer	7/10
IGN	PC: 7.2/10; PC: 9/10
PopMatters	5/10
RPGFan	PC: 80%
Kill Screen	PC: 79/100

Edit on Wikidata

The PC and Xbox One releases of Fragments of Him received "mixed or average" reviews, according to the review aggregator site Metacritic. On Steam, the game varies between 80% and 90% positive reviews. Reviewers said that because of the graphics, as well as the slow pace of the game, it was obviously created for casual gamers. Bob Richardson of the website RPGFan said that it might not be for everyone, and would appeal to those who like relaxing video games. He said that the design of the graphics might be too minimalistic for today, although he liked it and thought that it worked well with the game. He said that it was worth trying out and that the time the creators had put into making the game was obvious. Jose Rodriguez of the website IGN praised the "deep and realistic" story and said that the game gave priority to the narrative, and that it will appeal to casual gamers because of its realism and leisurely gameplay. Rodriguez criticised the duration of the game saying, that it is quite short for its price. Andrea Maderna, also from IGN, said that the game was not suited for everybody, but that those who appreciate games based on interactive storytelling should try playing it.

Colin Campbell from the website Polygon described the game as "emotional" and compared the "gloomy visual tones" to another video game, That Dragon, Cancer. Campbell said that Fragments of Him took time to rise to its emotional peak but when it does, it reaches it "with a searing and open humanity that connects the player with each of [the game's] characters". He continued by saying that the game contained excellent voice acting and writing. Laura Kate Dale, writing for the blog Destructoid, also compared Fragments of Him to That Dragon, Cancer.

Many reviewers praised the game's narrative. Andrea Maderna said that it gave off an emotional vibe and had fantastic narrative choices and structure, though the player's role is limited. Laura Kate Dale was disappointed, saying that the narrative would shine more in the form of a short film as it seemed more impressive when it was a "five minute convention floor demo than as a two and a half hour long finished product". Eric Swain, of the on-line magazine PopMatters, said that he found himself asking "Why is this a game?", and suggested that it would work better as an audio drama.

The game's repetitiveness was criticised by many reviewers. Sam Zucchi of Kill Screen said that the game got tedious and that the repetitiveness of clicking on objects was sometimes trivial. He said that it was as though the game was saying: "No, you really don't understand. Let me show you". Alessandro Baravalle of Eurogamer said that although parts of the game were poorly managed or redundant, it did have some exciting moments. Eric Swain said that the story is great but the game as a whole is let down by the repetitiveness of some parts and, as a result, becomes exhausting to play.

=== Awards ===
Fragments of Him has won one award and has been nominated for others. The game won the People's Choice Award at Develop: Brighton, as well as being nominated for the Writers' Guild Awards' Best Writing in a Video Game award, the SXSW Matthew Crump Cultural Innovation Award in 2017, and being nominated for five awards at the Game Connection conference in Paris. The five nominations consisted of the Best Desktop / Downloadable, Best Casual Game, Best Story / Storytelling, Most Creative & Original, and the Best Indie Game. It was also nominated for two Dutch Game Industry Awards in 2016 in the categories of Special Award and Best Music & Audio.
