= Kisses at Fifty =

- Play for Today episode
- Directed by: Michael Apted
- Written by: Colin Welland
- Original air date: 22 January 1973

Episode chronology
← Previous "Land of Green Ginger"	Next → "Highway Robbery"

"Kisses at Fifty" is a British television drama, part of the Play for Today series, originally broadcast in January 1973.

It was written by Colin Welland, directed by Michael Apted, and starred Bill Maynard as a man who kisses a barmaid (played by Marjorie Yates) on his 50th birthday. Rosemarie Dunham played his wife, and Lori Wells played his daughter Sandra.

It dealt realistically with issues of adultery and failed marriage, and won the British Academy Television Award for Best Single Drama in 1974. In real life, Maynard was only 44.
