= Alex Jennings =

British actor (born 1957)

Alex Jennings CBE
- Born: Alex Michael Jennings; 10 May 1957 (age 69); Upminster, Essex, England
- Occupation: Actor
- Years active: 1978–present
- Known for: The Queen (2006); The Lady in the Van (2015); The Crown (2016–2017); Victoria (2016–2019); A Very English Scandal (2018); Mr Bates vs The Post Office (2024)

Alex Michael Jennings CBE (born 10 May 1957) is an English actor of the stage and screen who has worked extensively with the Royal Shakespeare Company and the Royal National Theatre. For his work on the London stage, Jennings has received three Olivier Awards, winning for Too Clever by Half (1988), Peer Gynt (1996), and My Fair Lady (2003). He is the only performer to have won Olivier awards in the drama, musical, and comedy categories.

Jennings is known for his film work, in particular for his performance as Prince Charles in Stephen Frears's film The Queen (2006) opposite Helen Mirren. His other film appearances include The Wings of the Dove (1997), Bridget Jones: The Edge of Reason (2004), Babel (2006), Belle (2013), and The Lady in the Van (2015) starring Maggie Smith.

Jennings has won acclaim for his performances in television, including for his portrayal of Edward VIII, the Duke of Windsor, in the Netflix series The Crown opposite Claire Foy. He also starred as Leopold I of Belgium in the ITV series Victoria (2016–2019) opposite Jenna Coleman. His other roles include Stephen Frears's A Very English Scandal (2018) alongside Hugh Grant and Ben Whishaw, and in Steve McQueen's Small Axe: Mangrove (2020) starring Letitia Wright.

== Early life and education ==
Alex Michael Jennings was born in Romford, Essex, the son of Peggy Patricia (née Mahoney) and Michael Thomas Jennings. He attended Abbs Cross Technical High School in Hornchurch and studied English and theatre studies at the University of Warwick, graduating in 1978.

Jennings trained as an actor for two years at the Bristol Old Vic Theatre School.

== Career ==
=== 1980s ===
In the early 1980s, Jennings began his career in regional repertory theatre. In 1985, playing a range of roles including Maximilien Robespierre in The Scarlet Pimpernel. Jennings met director Nicholas Hytner during this production and has worked with him many times since. For his performance as Gloumov in Too Clever by Half at the Old Vic, he won the Olivier Award for Best Comedy Performance in 1988. He was nominated in the same category the following year for portraying Dorante in The Liar. He has performed for the Royal National Theatre in a number of plays, including Leontes in The Winter's Tale and the title role in Albert Speer.

Jennings's work in television includes appearances in The State Within, Smiley's People, The Franchise Affair, Inspector Morse, Lewis, Alfonso Bonzo, the title role in Ashenden, Dead Poets Society, Inspector Alleyn, Hard Times, Bad Blood, and Peter Ackroyd's London. His many radio credits include Casino Royale, The Way of the World, Strange Meeting, Vorbis in Small Gods, and The Old Curiosity Shop.

=== 1990s ===
Jennings's Royal Shakespeare Company roles include the title role in Peer Gynt (for which he won an Olivier Award 1995-06 for Best Actor), the title role in Richard II (opposite Anton Lesser as Henry Bolingbroke), Theseus/Oberon in A Midsummer Night's Dream (UK, American tour and Broadway), Angelo in Measure for Measure, and the title role in Hamlet.

Jennings also appeared in War Requiem, the RSC's film version of A Midsummer Night's Dream, and Joseph and the Amazing Technicolor Dreamcoat (1999). Jennings also appeared as Lord Mark in the romantic drama film The Wings of the Dove starring Helena Bonham Carter, Elizabeth McGovern, Charlotte Rampling, and Michael Gambon. The film received great acclaim and many awards nominations including four Academy Award nominations and five British Academy Film Award nominations.

=== 2000s ===
In 2002, Jennings appeared in the Cameron Mackintosh/Trevor Nunn revival of My Fair Lady at the Theatre Royal, Drury Lane and won an Olivier Award as Best Actor in a Musical. He was an Associate Artist at the Royal Shakespeare Company. That year he also appeared in The Four Feathers (2002) as Colonel Hamilton alongside Heath Ledger, Kate Hudson, and Michael Sheen. In 2004, he played George W. Bush in London in the original National Theatre production of David Hare's "Stuff Happens."

In 2006, Jennings made his breakthrough film role as Charles, Prince of Wales opposite Helen Mirren as Queen Elizabeth II in The Queen. The film was directed by Stephen Frears, and written by Peter Morgan. The film depicts the death of Diana, Princess of Wales on 31 August 1997 and the reaction from the British public and the British royal family. The film was an immense critical and box office success after it premiered at the Venice Film Festival. The film received six Academy Award nominations including a win for Mirren's performance.

In 2007, Jennings played the role of Garry Essendine in Noël Coward's Present Laughter at the NT. Also in 2007, he portrayed the Rev. Hutton in the BBC miniseries Cranford starring Judi Dench. He also played John Le Mesurier in the one-off BBC drama Hancock and Joan. In 2009, he appeared in The Habit of Art as Benjamin Britten.

In June 2008, Jennings made his debut in the Operetta at the ENO in Robert Carsen's production of Bernstein's Candide, in which he played Voltaire and Doctor Pangloss.

Jennings has recorded the audio versions of the books: Sins of the Father by Jeffrey Archer, The Kraken Wakes by John Wyndham, The Horse and His Boy, Out of the Silent Planet, and Perelandra by C.S. Lewis, Twenty Thousand Leagues Under the Seas by Jules Verne, and Attention All Shipping by Charlie Connelly, which was selected in June 2008 as one of the top 40 audiobooks of all time. In 2006, he recorded an abridgement of A Spot of Bother by Mark Haddon. He is also a regular narrator on BBC Radio 4's Book at Bedtime. He was also a member of the BBC's Radio Drama Company.

=== 2010s ===
In 2010, Jennings played Captain Shipshape in the CBeebies second series of Grandpa in my Pocket and starred in the film Belle. After that, he played Henry Tizard in Castles in the Sky. In 2011, he played Mikhail Bulgakov in the National Theatre's production of Collaborators. In 2014, he played the role of Willy Wonka in Charlie and the Chocolate Factory the Musical, which was directed by Sam Mendes and was performed on London's West End theatre district. He took over the role from Douglas Hodge in 2014.

From 2011 to 2014, Jennings played Alan Cowdrey QC in the BBC One legal drama Silk. He has also appeared in the ITV television series Lewis (2012), and Foyle's War (2015).

Jennings portrayed playwright Alan Bennett in the 2015 film The Lady in the Van opposite Academy Award winner Dame Maggie Smith in the title role. The film is directed by Nicolas Hytner, who is a long-time collaborator from the theatre. The film also featured performances from Jim Broadbent, Claire Foy, Frances de la Tour, and James Corden. The film premiered at the 2015 Toronto International Film Festival to great acclaim, specifically for Smith's performance. To promote the film Maggie Smith, and Jennings, appeared on The Graham Norton Show, this is Smith's first chat show appearance in over 40 years.

In 2016, Jennings reprised his role as Professor Henry Higgins in the Australian 60th anniversary production of My Fair Lady, directed by Julie Andrews. On television, from 2016 to 2017, he appeared in the Netflix series The Crown alongside Claire Foy and Jared Harris, as Prince Edward, Duke of Windsor, uncle to Queen Elizabeth and great-uncle to Prince Charles (whom Jennings played in The Queen). The series has received widespread acclaim from audiences and critics alike. Jennings also portrayed King Leopold I of Belgium in the ITV/PBS series Victoria (2016–2019) alongside Jenna Coleman.

In 2018, Jennings played Liberal MP Peter Bessell in the BBC One series, A Very English Scandal alongside Hugh Grant, and Ben Whishaw, a miniseries about the Jeremy Thorpe affair directed by Stephen Frears. The film received widespread critical acclaim with a 97% on Rotten Tomatoes with the critics consensus reading, "Hugh Grant and Ben Whishaw impress in A Very English Scandal, an equally absorbing and appalling look at British politics and society". The series also received four Primetime Emmy Award nominations including a win for Whishaw for his performance.

In 2019, Jennings played Andrew Aldridge, a Conservative MP, in the American TV miniseries Four Weddings and a Funeral.

=== 2020s ===
In 2020, Jennings appeared in the Small Axe miniseries directed by Steve McQueen, specifically the television movie Mangrove as Judge Edward Clarke alongside Letitia Wright as physician and British Black Panther Altheia Jones-LeCointe. In Mangrove, the story revolves around the true story based on the Mangrove Nine who were British black activists tried for inciting a riot at a protest, in 1970, against the police targeting of the Mangrove restaurant, Notting Hill, in west London. The film received widespread critical acclaim, with the critics consensus on Rotten Tomatoes reading, "Anchored by strong performances and an even stronger sense of conviction, Mangrove is a powerful indictment of institutional racism."

== Acting credits ==
=== Film ===
Year	Title	Role	Notes
1989	War Requiem	Blinded Soldier	
1996	A Midsummer Night's Dream	Theseus/Oberon	
1997	The Wings of the Dove	Lord Mark	
1999	Joseph and the Amazing Technicolor Dreamcoat	The Butler	
2002	The Four Feathers	Colonel Hamilton	
2004	Five Children and It	Father	
2004	Bridget Jones: The Edge of Reason	Horatio	
2006	Babel	Ken Clifford	
2006	The Queen	Prince Charles	
2008	The Disappeared	Adrian Ballan	
2010	Words of the Blitz	George Orwell	
2013	Trap for Cinderella	Chance	
2013	Belle	Lord Ashford	
2014	Castles in the Sky	Henry Tizard	
2015	The Lady in the Van	Alan Bennett	
2016	Denial	Sir Charles Gray	
2021	Munich – The Edge of War	Sir Horace Wilson	
2021	Operation Mincemeat	John Masterman	
2021	The Forgiven	Lord Swanthorne	
2022	Your Christmas or Mine?	Humphrey Hughes	
2023	Your Christmas or Mine 2	Humphrey Hughes	
2024	Blitz	Victor Smythe	
2025	The Phoenician Scheme	Broadcloth	
2025	Ballad of a Small Player	Adrian Lippett	

=== Television ===
Year	Title	Role	Notes
1982	Smiley's People	P.C. Hall	Episode: "Episode No. 1.1"
1986	Kit Curran	PC Woods	Episode: "A Sick Society"
1988	The Franchise Affair	Nevil Bennet	6 episodes
1989	The Return of Shelley	Jeremy	Episode: "The Gospel According to Shelley"
1990	Inspector Morse	Victor Preece	Episode: "The Sins of the Fathers"
1990	Alfonso Bonzo	Alfonso Bonzo	6 episodes
1991	Ashenden	John Ashenden	4 episodes
1991	Bye Bye Columbus	King Ferdinand	Television movie
1992	ScreenPlay	Byron	Episode: "Dread Poets' Society"
1993	The Inspector Alleyn Mysteries	Sebastian Parish	Episode: "Death at the Bar"
1994	Hard Times	Bitzer	Episode: "Episode No. 1.1"
1997	Liberty! The American Revolution	King George III	6 episodes
1999	Bad Blood	Joe Harker	Television movie
1999	The Hunley	Lt. Alexander	Television movie
2000	Too Much Sun	Julian Edgbaston-Bowles	6 episodes
2002	100 Greatest Britons	Churchill	Voice; Episode: "Sir Winston Churchill"
2004	London	Stephen Spender	Television movie
2005	A Very Social Secretary	Alastair Campbell	Television movie
2005	Riot at the Rite	Sergei Diaghilev	Television movie
2005	Agatha Christie's Poirot	Dr Roberts	Episode: "Cards on the Table"
2006	Spooks	James Allan	Episode: "Episode No. 5.4"
2006	The State Within	James Sinclair	6 episodes
2007	Waking the Dead	James Andrews	2 episodes
2007–2009	Cranford	Reverend Hutton	7 episodes
2008	10 Days to War	Vincent	Episode: "Failure Is Not an Option"
2008	Fairy Tales	Roger Bateman	Episode: "Rapunzel"
2008	Hancock and Joan	John Le Mesurier	Television movie
2008	The 39 Steps	Captain Kell	Television movie, BBC
2009	The Last Days of Lehman Brothers	Timothy Geithner	Television movie
2009	Agatha Christie's Marple	Inspector Curry	Episode: "They Do It with Mirrors"
2009–2010	Whitechapel	Commander Anderson	5 episodes
2010	Masterpiece Classic	Captain Kell	Episode: "The 39 Steps"
2010	Grandpa in My Pocket	Captain Shipshape	Episode: "Captain Shipshape and a Fish Called Bryan"
2010	On Expenses	Andrew Walker	Television movie
2011–2014	Silk	Alan Cowdrey, QC	13 episodes
2012	Being Human	Griffin	Episode: "Eve of the War"
2012	Lewis	Rev Conor Hawes	Episode: "The Soul of Genius"
2012	New Tricks	Prof. Blake	Episode: "Body of Evidence"
2012	We'll Take Manhattan	John Parsons	Television movie
2013	The Lady Vanishes	The Professor	Television movie
2015	Churchill's Secret	Anthony Eden	Television movie, PBS
2015	Foyle's War	Clive Ord-Smith	Episode: "Trespass"
2016–2019	Victoria	King Leopold I	9 episodes
2016–2017, 2022	The Crown	Prince Edward, Duke of Windsor	Main role (Seasons 1–2); Guest role (Season 5)
2017	The Halcyon	Lord Hamilton	Episode: #1.1
2018	A Very English Scandal	Peter Bessell	3 episodes
2018	Unforgotten	Tim Finch	6 episodes
2019	Four Weddings and a Funeral	Andrew Aldridge	Miniseries, Hulu
2019	Gold Digger	Ted Day	6 episodes
2020	Small Axe	Judge Clarke	Episode: "Mangrove"
2022	This Is Going to Hurt	Nigel Lockhart	7 episodes
2022	The Undeclared War	David Neal	5 episodes
2024	Mr Bates vs The Post Office	James Arbuthnot	4 episodes
2024	The New Look	Raymond Dior	2 episodes
2024	A Very Royal Scandal	Sir Edward Young	3 episodes
2024	Wolf Hall: The Mirror and the Light	Stephen Gardiner	3 episodes
2024	The Agency	Frank	Episode: "The Bends"
2025	MobLand	Archie Hammond	3 episodes
2025	Suspect: The Shooting of Jean Charles de Menezes	Michael Mansfield	Episode: "The Verdict"
2026	Legends	Home Secretary	Supporting cast; 6 episodes

=== Theatre ===
Year	Title	Role	Playwright	Venue	Ref.
1985	The Scarlet Pimpernel	Performer	Baroness Orczy	Her Majesty's Theatre	
1987–88	Measure for Measure	Lucio	William Shakespeare	Royal Shakespeare Company	
1988	Too Clever by Half	Yegor Dimitrich Gloumov	Alexander Ostrovsky	Old Vic Theatre, London	
1988	The Country Wife	Performer	William Wycherley	Royal Exchange, Manchester	
1989	Ghetto	Kittel	Yehoshua Sobol	National Theatre	
1990	The Wild Duck	Hjalmar Ekdal	Henrik Ibsen	Peter Hall Company	
1990	The Liars	Dorante	Henry Arthur Jones	Old Vic Theatre, London	
1990	Richard II	Richard II	William Shakespeare	Royal Shakespeare Company	
1992	The Recruiting Officer	Captain Plume	George Farquhar	National Theatre	
1993	The Importance of Being Earnest	John Worthing	Oscar Wilde	Aldwych Theatre	
1994	Peer Gynt	Peer Gynt	Henrik Ibsen	Royal Shakespeare Company	
1994–95	Measure for Measure	Angelo	William Shakespeare	Royal Shakespeare Company	
1996	A Midsummer Night's Dream	Oberon/Theseus	William Shakespeare	Lunt-Fontanne Theatre, Broadway	
1996	Hyde Park	Performer	James Shirley	Royal Shakespeare Company	
1996	The Taming of the Shrew	Lucentio	William Shakespeare	Royal Shakespeare Company	
1997	Hamlet	Hamlet	William Shakespeare	Royal Shakespeare Company	
2000	Albert Speer	Albert Speer	David Edgar	Lyttelton Theatre, London	
2001	The Winter's Tale	Performer	William Shakespeare	Royal National Theatre	
2001	The Relapse	Foppington	John Vanbrugh	Royal National Theatre	
2001	My Fair Lady	Prof. Henry Higgins	Alan Jay Lerner & Frederick Loewe	Royal National Theatre	
2007	Present Laughter	Garry Essendine	Noël Coward	Royal National Theatre	
2009	The Habit of Art	Henry	Alan Bennett	National Theatre of Great Britain; Lyttelton Theatre in London	
2011	Collaborators	Mikhail Bulgakov	John Hodge	National Theatre of Great Britain; Cottesloe Theatre in London	
2012	Hymn/Cocktail Sticks	Performer	Alan Bennett	National Theatre of Great Britain; Lyttelton Theatre in London	
2013	Charlie and the Chocolate Factory	Willy Wonka	Marc Shaiman, Scott Wittman & David Greig	Theatre Royal Drury Lane, London	
2016	My Fair Lady	Prof. Henry Higgins	Alan Jay Lerner & Frederick Loewe	Sydney Opera House	
2019	Hansard	Robin Hesketh	Simon Woods	Royal National Theatre	
2019	The Light in the Piazza	Signor Naccarelli	Adam Guettel & Craig Lucas	Royal Festival Hall, London; Civic Opera House Chicago	
2022	The Southbury Child	David Highland	Stephen Beresford	Chichester Festival Theatre; Bridge Theatre, London	

Filmed Theatrical Events

- 1999: Joseph and the Amazing Technicolor Dreamcoat as Butler
- 2010: National Theatre Live: The Habit of Art as Henry / Benjamin Britten
- 2011: National Theatre Live: Collaborators as Mikhail Bulgakov
- 2013: National Theatre Live: 50 Years on Stage as Henry Higgins
- 2019: National Theatre Live: Hansard as Robin Hesketh

== Awards and nominations ==
Year	Award	Category	Title	Result	Ref.
1988	Olivier Award	Best Comedy Performance	Too Clever by Half	Won	
1990	Olivier Award	Best Comedy Performance	The Liar	Nominated	
1996	Olivier Award	Best Actor	Peer Gynt	Won	
2003	Olivier Award	Best Actor in a Musical	My Fair Lady	Won	
2019	British Academy Television Awards	Best Supporting Actor	Unforgotten	Nominated	

Jennings was appointed Commander of the Order of the British Empire (CBE) in the 2024 Birthday Honours for services to drama.
