= Jankers =

Disciplinary measures in the British military

In the British Armed Services, "Jankers" or "Restrictions of Privileges" refers to an official disciplinary measure employed for minor breaches of military discipline. This contrasts with more severe punitive actions like "detention," which is reserved for more serious or criminal offenses. When a service member is "on jankers," it indicates that they have been subjected to disciplinary action initiated by a non-commissioned officer (NCO) or occasionally a commissioned officer (referred to in service slang as "being put on a fizzer"). The alleged offence is documented on a Charge Report (Army or RAF Form No. 252).

Following a hearing before an officer, the decision to impose the punishment is made based on the evidence presented and any mitigating circumstances. The use of acronyms is common in the British military, as in many organizations, and such abbreviations often become part of the standard jargon. The term "Jankers" may have originated as a shorthand for "Justice Administered by NCO" and subsequently evolved into its colloquial form.

== Terminology ==
Jankers is a much used vernacular term. The official Army terminology for Jankers was "CB" which means "Confined to Barracks" or in the RAF "CC" "Confined to Camp" but later during the epoch of National Service the term was changed to "ROP" or "Restrictions of Privileges" in both Services.

The term jankers is today very occasionally used jokingly in civilian life, such as in journalism to mean the punishment of minor infringements by the imposition of tedious duties.

== Ordering of Jankers ==
As an alternative to ordering Jankers, the officer may alternatively decide to "dismiss the charge", if they have considered the serviceperson had no case to answer. Or the officer may simply "admonish" them if they have decided the alleged breach of discipline had occurred but was just not serious enough to warrant Jankers. For some offences, like drunkenness, the officer might alternatively impose a fine instead of Jankers.

When Jankers is "awarded" by the officer taking the charge, the officer will also specify the number of days the Jankers would last for up to a maximum of 14 days.

The officer's decision, in this regard, is dependent upon their judgement of the seriousness, or otherwise, of the offence(s) committed and also whether it is a first offence or there were previous similar breaches of discipline already recorded on the offending serviceperson's conduct sheet. "Jankers" is a familiar part of life during Regular and National Service in both the British Army and the Royal Air Force.

The kinds of offences which, most typically, resulted in being put on Jankers, have always been fairly minor breaches of discipline, most commonly being AWOL, e.g. returning to base slightly late after leave on a weekend pass. Other common offences, often resulting in a spell of Jankers, were being caught still in bed after reveille, being drunk, being deemed "scruffy" when in uniform such as boots or brasses not gleaming satisfactorily, performing some minor duty lazily or carelessly, failing to comply correctly with some order or regulation, failing to salute an officer correctly or some other similar mistake, being late for some duty, being untidy or lazy in his barrack room, such as not sweeping his bed space properly or having dust on his locker, making a sloppy bed pack, or else not being up to the required standard of smartness on parade or on a kit inspection.

In many such cases, another officer might have ordered an NCO to "put that man on a Charge" when the breach of discipline or mistake was originally observed, and the form 252 would then be signed by the NCO. The more severe punishment of "detention" was given for offences which might be considered as criminal in a civil court, such as theft or violence against another person, or insubordination. Detention could only be given to a soldier or airman by the Commanding Officer, usually somebody of the Army rank of Colonel or RAF rank of Group Captain or by a convened Court Martial Board. Jankers could be given by a less senior officer, most typically a Captain or Flight Lieutenant.

== Being on Jankers ==
Although what being on Jankers involved has varied between different bases, different Services and over time, typically, whilst on Jankers, the soldier or airmen was subjected to several punishment parades and inspections each day in different forms of dress, starting with working clothes fatigues half an hour after reveille, where he paraded outside the guardhouse for inspection by the Orderly Officer. After inspection, the offender is sent to perform a variety of tasks, often menial, before breakfast. After lunch, the man has to report again to the guardroom for inspection, and is then assigned unpleasant work, known as "fatigues", until shortly before he must attend the afternoon's muster parade. After tea, he parades again at the guardhouse, this time in battledress and in battle order, where he is rigorously inspected. Any criticism of his turnout or equipment can result in another 'charge' or 'fizzer.' The final parade of the day was at 22.00 hours, and in best Battle Dress, best boots, sharply and cleanly turned out, and with every piece of equipment provided by the Army. After inspection, the soldier could then return to barracks, prepare his kit for tomorrow's parades, and then get to bed for some rest.

The theory was that the whole punishment made the offender's daily life unpleasant, having to get up extremely early, then rushing about miserable, often having the mickey taken out of him by his mates and perhaps feeling humiliated. So he was thereby motivated never to repeat in future, the mistake or slackness that got him put on the charge in the first place. Being put on Jankers was never considered an indication of bad character in the Services, but particularly in the days of conscription, rather more as normal Armed Forces discipline likely to be experienced by the majority of "other ranks", or ratings (RN), at some time or other while in the Forces.

British cinema films of that epoch like Private's Progress (1956) and Carry on Sergeant (1958) habitually made fun of Jankers, as have memoirs of life in the armed services.
