= Citizen Smith =

British TV sitcom (1977–1980)

- Created by: John Sullivan
- Starring: Robert Lindsay; Mike Grady; Cheryl Hall; Hilda Braid; Peter Vaughan; Tony Steedman; Tony Millan; George Sweeney; Stephen Greif; David Garfield
- Country of origin: United Kingdom
- Original language: English
- No. of series: 4
- No. of episodes: 30 (list of episodes)

Production
- Running time: 30 minutes

Original release
- Network: BBC1
- Release: 12 April 1977 – 31 December 1980

Citizen Smith is a British television sitcom written by John Sullivan, first broadcast from 1977 to 1980.

It starred Robert Lindsay as Walter Henry "Wolfie" Smith, a young Marxist "urban guerrilla" in Tooting, south London, who is attempting to emulate his hero Che Guevara. The main character's name comes from Winston Smith in Orwell's '1984' (claims that it was an alias of Irish revolutionary Wolfe Tone whilst living in Paris are an internet urban legend with no foundation), with the first name being a reference to German poet and dissident Wolf Biermann's 1973 song "(Hasta Siempre) Commandante Che Guevara". Wolfie is the self-proclaimed leader of the revolutionary Tooting Popular Front (the TPF, merely being his small bunch of friends), the goals of which are "Power to the People" and "Freedom for Tooting".

Wolfie dresses in a stereotypical fashion for rebellious students of the period: logoed T-shirt, denim jeans, Afghan coat, and black beret. He supports Fulham and occasionally wears a Fulham scarf. He rides a scooter and lives in the attic room at his girlfriend's parents’ house, and constantly clashes with her over-protective father.

== Cast ==
- Robert Lindsay as Walter Henry "Wolfie" Smith
- Mike Grady as Ken Mills
- George Sweeney as Speed (Anthony "Speed" King)
- Tony Millan as Tucker
- Cheryl Hall as Shirley Johnson (series 1–2)
- Hilda Braid as Florence Johnson, Shirley's mother
- Artro Morris as Charles Johnson, Shirley's father (pilot episode)
- Peter Vaughan/Tony Steedman as Charlie Johnson, Shirley's father (series 1–2) and (series 3–4; 1980 Christmas special)
- Stephen Greif as Harry Fenning (series 1–3)
- David Garfield as Ronnie Lynch (series 4; 1980 Christmas special)
- Susie Baker as Mandy Lynch (series 4; 1980 Christmas special)
- Anna Nygh as Desiree, Speed's girlfriend (series 1–2)
- John Tordoff as policeman, Brian Tofkin (series 3-4)

== History ==
John Sullivan became a scenery shifter at the BBC in 1974 because of his desire to write a sitcom outline he had called Citizen Smith; fearing rejection if he sent the idea in, he decided it would be better to get a job, any job, at the BBC, learn more about the business and then meet someone who would actually take notice of his as yet unwritten script. After he approached producer Dennis Main Wilson, the first Citizen Smith script was written. Main Wilson loved the script, and saw the potential for a series; it was put into production almost immediately as a pilot for Comedy Special — a showcase for new talent, which had succeeded Comedy Playhouse — under the title Citizen Smith. The pilot was a success, and four series and a Christmas special were produced between 1977 and 1980.

It has been claimed that the "Tooting Popular Front" — fictionally based near to writer John Sullivan's childhood home of Balham — was partly inspired by a real-life fellow-South London far-left group, the Brixton-based Workers' Institute of Marxism-Leninism-Mao Tsetung Thought. The group's activities were reported in The Times' diary of April 1977, the same month the pilot episode of Citizen Smith was broadcast.

== Opening titles ==
The opening titles of each episode of the first two series always began with Wolfie emerging from Tooting Broadway Underground station, followed by a shot of him kicking a can across a bridge until he is in close up, accompanied by a background rendition of the socialist anthem The Red Flag. They always ended with him shouting "Power to the People", resulting in awkward consequences such as waking a sleeping baby or causing a vehicle to crash. From the third series, the shots of Wolfie on the bridge were replaced with on-screen clips of other cast members and their names, rather than just the list of names that had been used previously, and the reactions to Wolfie's shout were dropped entirely. Series 4 had a new title sequence, which began with Tucker's van driving past Tooting Broadway tube station with "The Revolution is Back" painted on it. The rest of the credits were backed by clips from the last episode of series three, "The Glorious Day", and Wolfie's shout is heard, but he is not seen.

== Plot ==
=== Series 1 ===
From episode three, "Abide with Me", Wolfie Smith (Robert Lindsay) lives, with his religious, teetotal friend Ken Mills (Mike Grady), in a flat in the house of his girlfriend's family — Shirley Johnson (Cheryl Hall, at the time Lindsay's wife); her affable but naïve mother, Florence, who mistakenly calls Wolfie "Foxy"; and her strict, right-wing father, Charlie, who disapproves of Smith's lifestyle and refers to him as a "flaming yeti" or "Chairman Mao". Shirley considers herself engaged to Wolfie, on account of a fake crocodile tooth necklace he gave her after she was asked when they would get engaged.

Other regular characters in the series are the other "urban guerrillas": Tucker (married to the ever-pregnant but never-seen June); Speed, the TPF's Warlord, and his girlfriend Desiree; and local gangster publican Harry Fenning (played by Stephen Greif), who refers to Wolfie as "Trotsky". Wolfie and the TPF frequent Harry's pub, The Vigilante, and are at times menaced by Harry's hired muscle Floyd and Cyril (played by Dana Michie and Barry Hayes), who are referred to by Florence as "Mr Fenning's foster children".

The closest Wolfie comes to legitimate political office is contesting the Tooting North constituency as the TPF candidate at a parliamentary by-election, whose election night declaration is televised; however, he gains only six votes, losing to the Conservative candidate David West. He and the gang attempt to kidnap the new MP from a victory celebration, only to mistakenly capture Harry Fenning (who was leaving the Conservative Club during the occasion) instead (Episode 6 - "The Hostage").

=== Series 2 ===
Series two consists of six episodes; however, owing to industrial action at the BBC on 22 December 1978, one episode ("Spanish Fly") had to be rescheduled as a special in August 1979.

=== Series 3 ===
"The Glorious Day", which Wolfie had always been plotting, comes at the end of the third series, in an episode of the same name, in which the Tooting Popular Front "liberate" a Scorpion tank and use it to invade the Houses of Parliament, only to find the place empty, owing to a parliamentary recess. During the TPF's "annual manoeuvres" on Salisbury Plain, Wolfie, Ken, Tucker and Speed decide to camp down after an evening of heavy drinking; unbeknownst to them, they are in the middle of a military live firing area. During the night, the Army hold an exercise, and the Scorpion is "abandoned" by its crew after being declared "knocked out" by a "landmine" during a training exercise. When Wolfie and his comrades discover this, Wolfie comes up with his revolutionary plan. Speed states that he learned to drive a Scorpion during his time in the Territorial Army, at which point the group steal it and drive it back to London.

On returning, they hide it in Charlie Johnson's garage. Charlie comes home from work and opens the garage door to park his car. Curious as to the purpose of the Scorpion parked amongst the garden tools, he climbs down inside and accidentally steps on the machine-gun fire button. The result is that their neat garden is raked with heavy machine-gun fire, narrowly missing his wife Florence who is hanging out the washing, and annihilating their garden gnomes. This episode also includes a new song from John Sullivan and sung by Robert Lindsay — "We are the TPF. We are the People."

Series three consists of seven episodes.

=== Series 4 ===
The series began with Wolfie and company being paroled. A brief flirtation at being pop stars on the back of their "fame" ended in disaster. While the TPF have been away, a new gangster, Ronnie Lynch, has usurped Fenning's position in Tooting, including his old pub. Wolfie hates him more than he did Fenning, and after various run-ins with Lynch (who constantly refers to Wolfie as "Wally"), the series was concluded in the penultimate episode, with Wolfie fleeing Tooting to escape a £6,000 contract put on his head by Ronnie Lynch after Lynch had caught Wolfie in his wife Mandy's bedroom. Closing with a shot mirroring the opening credits, Wolfie is seen entering Tooting Broadway tube station. Series four consisted of seven episodes and a Christmas special, "Buon Natale", in which Wolfie and Ken ride to Rimini on Wolfie's Lambretta to visit Shirley for the festive period, only to find that she has become romantically involved with an Italian named Paolo. This episode was shown after the series officially ended, but is set before the events of the last episode.

== Notes ==
- Some sources erroneously name the pilot as "A Roof Over My Head", which was actually the title of the previous week's Comedy Special, written by Barry Took (which also led to a series).
- In the penultimate episode, Wolfie's full name was revealed as Walter Henry Smith – W H Smith.
- Early episodes state that there are six members of the Tooting Popular Front, but only four appear onscreen. In series 3 Wolfie says that two founder members have left the TPF: Dave the Nose (the TPF's Foreign Secretary) has emigrated, and Reg X (a Black Panther) is playing second oil drum in a steel band at Butlins.
- In the 1980 Christmas special, the Italianate village of Portmeirion in North Wales stood in for Rimini, with other locations in the vicinity used for other parts of their journey across Europe.
- The 1980 Christmas special featured the Beatles' song "Here Comes the Sun", which has been replaced on subsequent DVD releases, owing to licensing issues.
- In the original television broadcast of the episode, "Working Class Hero", the music that accompanies Wolfie's commute on his first day at work is "Carry That Weight" from the Beatles' Abbey Road album. This too was substituted on the DVD issue, with a nondescript jazz tune.
- The end title theme was written by John Sullivan and sung by Robert Lindsay, and is called "The Glorious Day".

== Episodes ==
The show aired between 1977 and 1980 in four seasons.

== Novel ==
Citizen Smith, a novelisation of the first series written by Christopher Kenworthy, was published by Universal books, London in 1978.

== Mooted revival ==
In 2015, Lindsay was reported as saying he was very keen to reprise the role of Wolfie Smith, particularly with the rise of Jeremy Corbyn. However, it was also reported that the family of the by then deceased Sullivan, who own the rights, did not want to bring it back.

== Home media ==
Playback released two DVD volumes of Citizen Smith, each with two series. Series one and two (including the pilot) were released in 2003 followed by series three and four later that year.

Only two episodes have actually been cut: "Changes" – where Tucker and Wolfie miming to the Beatles tracks "Till There Was You" (and Tucker's line "I think they like us.") and "Help!" have been cut from the scene where Tucker serenades June; and "Prisoners" – where a short scene of Wolfie singing along to the Beatles track "She Loves You", which comes in between the shot of Speed throwing stones at Wolfie's window and the shot of the window breaking, has also been cut.

Cinema Club bought the rights to the series, and later released all four series in a complete series set on 17 July 2017.

In Spring 2026, Fabulous Films is scheduled to release Citizen Smith: The Complete Series (1977–1980) on Blu-ray for the first time. The four-disc set features a new restoration from the surviving original tape elements, with previously removed scenes reinstated using revised music.
