= Oliver Bayldon =

British production designer (1938–2019)

Oliver Bayldon FRSA, FCSD
- Born: Richard Oliver Maxwell Bayldon; 12 September 1938; Leicester
- Died: 23 December 2019 (aged 81); London
- Education: Leicester College of Art
- Occupation: Production designer
- Years active: 1961–1997
- Employers: Northampton Repertory Theatre; BBC Television
- Awards: Full list

Oliver Bayldon (12 September 1938 – 23 December 2019) was a London-based British production designer who worked with the Northampton Repertory Theatre, the BBC, and the Royal Academy of Music. Between 1966 and 1997, he designed over 220 TV drama episodes and films.

He is best known for designing sets for TV shows such as: Meet the Wife (1966), Till Death Us Do Part (1968), The Railway Children (1968), Dad's Army (1968), Z-Cars (1970–1971), The Onedin Line (1971–1972), Poldark (1975–1976), When the Boat Comes In (1976–1977), Happy Ever After (1978), Shakespeare's first tetralogy (the Henry VI plays and Richard III) directed by Jane Howell (1983), Strangers and Brothers (1984), On the Up (1990), Memento Mori (1992), and Wokenwell (1997). For the Royal Academy of Music, he created costumes or sets for four operas: Belisario (1972), The Fairy Queen Act IV: The Masque of the Seasons, Tobermory, and Trial by Jury (all 1977). His design work was the subject of five exhibitions held between 1959 and 1996.

Bayldon also wrote poetry, essays and fiction published in newspapers and books, and some of his poems and short stories were broadcast on radio. He is a cousin of the actor Geoffrey Bayldon.

== Early life and education ==
Oliver Bayldon was born in Leicester and brought up in Rutland where, aged five, he decided he wanted to be a theatre designer after attending his first pantomime and being more impressed by the sets than by the acting.

At the age of five, I was taken to see Where the Rainbow Ends at the theatre as a Christmas treat and was wildly impressed by the décor. When I got home I started making model stages of cardboard and Plasticine and announced I was going to become a theatre designer!

— Oliver Bayldon, in Creating a Visual Style (2013)

In August 1943, Bayldon took part in a Child Artists' competition organised at the Leicester Museum, where painting and plasticine modelling competitions had been arranged during a holiday-at-home programme. Prizes were presented by the Leicester Lord Mayor, and Bayldon was one of the winners.

=== 1946–1957: Stamford School ===
In 1946, Bayldon joined Stamford School for eleven years, where he began to develop his design and production skills. In December 1953, aged 15, he participated in the presentation of Shakespeare's Coriolanus by the school's Dramatic Society, for which he also designed and stencilled the soldiers' and crowd's costumes. A few weeks later, he organised a variety show called To-night's the Night with ballet, sketches and songs, in aid of one of his witty schemes: the "Morcott Dustbin Society". Morcott is a village near Barrowden—his family home—and was devoid of dustbins at the time. During an interview with the Stamford Mercury on 15 January 1954, Bayldon explained: "I was about to put on a show anyway, so I thought it would be a good idea to do one for a litter basket". The show was a success and raised £2 8s. towards a dustbin. Prior to the show, Bayldon had paid a visit to the Theatre Royal, Covent Garden, and secured a batch of costumes which were no longer used.

At the end of 1954, the school produced Nikolai Gogol's The Government Inspector, for which Bayldon designed and painted the Victorian décor, as well as acting in the leading female part "with fine control of voice and features." In the spring of 1955, Bayldon designed the costumes for the school's production of Christopher Fry's The Boy with a Cart, a story of St Cuthman, written as a legend of miracles and faith in the style of the mystery plays. In December 1955, the boys presented the first part of Shakespeare's Henry IV to a limited number of parents and friends; in addition to designing and painting the scenery, Bayldon played the role of the Archbishop of York.

In November 1956, a group of masters from the school, aided by wives and friends, produced an amusing version of Brandon Thomas's Charley's Aunt to raise money for new stage equipment; Bayldon was responsible for designing the scenery. For their end-of-term play in December 1957, the boys gave a public performance—the first to use Dudley Fitts's new translation—of Aristophanes's The Frogs, a Greek comedy produced at Athens in 405 B.C.. The play, for which Bayldon had painted the gateway, was produced under the scholarly guidance of Mr. Chapman, senior classics master.

=== 1958–1961: Leicester College of Art ===
In 1958, Bayldon enrolled on a course of studies in Fine Arts and Textile Design at Leicester College of Art and Technology. He soon discovered that no amateur drama society existed, despite there being a fine stage. The Leicester Evening Mail would later quote him saying: "Attempts have often been made to get one going, but one or two people have been left to do all the work. So many students are committed to evening study that it is hard to organise a group." In July, he was awarded the Sir Jonathan North Endowment Scheme gold medal for his designs of costumes and set for the musical My Fair Lady, which he created specially for this art competition. At the time, the production had not yet come to Britain, and he had never even seen a photograph of it. So he set to work in his spare time to study the Edwardian era and relied extensively on his knowledge of the play. Upon receiving the prize, he told the Leicester Mercury: "I had to imagine what Bernard Shaw's Pygmalion would be like as a musical. But I enjoyed the whole thing tremendously. I hope to take up stage or television design as a career." The Vice-Chancellor of the University, Dr. C. H. Wilson, who had been on the awards committee for six years, said: "In presenting Mr. Richard O. M. Bayldon, of the Leicester College of Art, with the gold medal, we found he had remarkable sympathy with the Edwardian era".

In August 1959, he launched his first exhibition, entitled Paintings and Stage Designs, at the Bookshop in King Street, Leicester. In December, he organised the college's Arts Ball at Leicester Palais on a "Medieval" theme, and led the ball—attended by 800—in a knight's mailed armour, with plumed helmet. In March 1960, he was 'Commended' in the "Stage and Television Settings" section of a design contest organised by the Royal Society of Arts industrial art bursaries, for which 653 young designers had entered. In May, St Anthony Press, a private book publisher in Leicester, published one of Bayldon's poems, entitled "Morning", illustrated by Chris Shorten. The reviewer from the Leicester Evening Mail, stated that: "Mr. Bayldon is a young Leicester student who has had poems broadcast on the BBC Third Programme, and who is likely to have a successful career as a stage designer." In August, he wrote an article in the first issue of Crescent, one of Leicester's two privately published magazines. The Leicester Evening Mail reviewer wrote: "Oliver Bayldon, an articulate and perceptive writer, whose work has found favour with the BBC, tries to define art and says society must come to terms with it." At the end of September 1960, the Malvern Drama Club presented Norman Ginsbury's English language version of Ibsen's Peer Gynt, with sets designed by Bayldon.

Later in 1960, Bayldon was invited by a local furniture store to attend the Furniture Exhibition in Manchester. The store manager was so impressed with Bayldon's comments that he commissioned him to assemble and decorate a living room and bedroom to his individual taste, a project he completed in November. (Note: In her review for the Leicester Daily Mercury on 19 November 1960, Kaye Almey wrote: "(...) Mr. Bayldon's creed for young homes is built on areas of warm colours—he carpeted his living room with vermilion, sharpened up the bedroom with citron yellow—and the gradual collection, when money is tight, of good pieces of furniture rather than making a more complete start with cheaper lines. He showed marked enthusiasm for fireplaces in the centre of a living room rather than attached to a wall. (...) [Photo caption:] The young idea of what a living room should look like. Leicester College of Art student, Mr. Oliver Bayldon, who planned it, chose a curved settee in charcoal and deep blue, scatter cushion, a round supper table, room dividers and a low long sideboard.") The same month, Bayldon was among the students who plotted a hoax to publicise their year-end Arts Ball, as they began digging trenches in a bogus search for antiquities from an Egyptian mercenary camp site on the demolition plot where the new college was going to be built. After unearthing a medieval wall, bones, and pieces of ancient pottery, they alerted officials of Leicester Museum who became interested, and Bayldon decided to call off the hoax and continue with serious excavations.

In March 1961, he was awarded £150 in another design contest organised by the Royal Society of Arts industrial art bursaries, again in the "Stage and Television" section. On the strength of this RSA design award, he won an Arts Council New Designers trainee scheme, which would lead to his appointment as an assistant designer at the Northampton Repertory Theatre. In June, he was elected Fellow of the RSA. In August, Bayldon was one of the college's 39 students graduating with a National Diploma in Design. From August to November, he spent his RSA bursary undertaking a 14-weeks study tour to the United States, travelling through 13 states to study arts and design. On his return, he relayed his experiences in four articles published in the Stamford Mercury on successive Fridays, from 15 December 1961.

== Career ==
=== 1961–1963: Northampton Repertory Theatre ===
Shortly after returning from his US study tour in November 1961, 22-year-old Bayldon began a one-year apprenticeship on an Arts Council Scholarship at the Northampton Repertory Theatre, as an assistant to the long-serving regular designer Thomas Osborne Robinson. The design team included John Page, also 22, who had joined Robinson in 1959. In early 1962, Bayldon designed and produced banners for St Mary's Church, in Glenfield, a village to the west of Leicester.

In September 1962, Page and Bayldon—who was about to start his second year at the Repertory, now as a designer—stood in for Robinson when he took a sabbatical to teach at Vanderbilt University until late 1963. They maintained Robinson's high design standards, (Note: On 18 July 1963, a reviewer for The Stage highlighted the outstanding productions of the season as including: "The Party, with Valerie Bond and Jonathan Adams; Storm Lantern, in which David Lyn played David Lloyd George; Peter Ustinov's Photo Finish, with Jonathan Adams, John Cheffins, Alan Brown and Mark Lewes as the four Sams; the musical Love From Judy, with Yvonne Marlowe as a captivating Judy, Babes in the Wood, one of the best-ever pantomimes in which Lionel Hamilton again excelled as the Dame, The Rivals, with Vera Lennox as Mrs. Mala-prop, Jean Anouilh's The Rehearsal, and A Passage to India. (...) The premiere of Roy Plomley's The Shiny Surface was notable for the appearance of Vic Oliver as guest star. Other guest artists included Tenniel Evans (a former member of the company) with Chairmain Eyre in The Keep. (...) During the absence of scenic designer Osborne Robinson, in America, John Page and Oliver Bayldon have kept up the high standard associated with this company. (...) The company finished the season with an elegant production of Somerset Maugham's The Circle".) and Bayldon was credited, for costumes or settings, on the playbills of: Guilty Party and Murder at Quay Cottage (both 1962), Babes in the Wood (1962–1963), The Shiny Surface, Write Me a Murder, and Go Back For Murder (all 1963). Bayldon would also act for the Repertory Theatre; he played one of the "Gentlemen, Dancers and Guests" in the 1961 Christmas season pantomime of Cinderella, and "Ranjit, Fielding's servant" during the run of A Passage to India (17–29 September 1962) which included Ken Loach as "Mr Burton-Fletcher, a Civil Servant". It was Loach—on a trainee director's course backed by an ITV company at the time—who turned Bayldon's attention towards television.

On 23 February 1963, Bayldon launched a month-long exhibition, entitled Costume and Theatre Designs, at the Museum and Art Gallery, Northampton.

=== 1963–1995: BBC Television and Royal Academy of Music ===
When Bayldon's second year at the Northampton Repertory Theatre was coming to an end, he received an advertisement from BBC Television to apply for a design assistant post for the forthcoming opening of a second BBC channel, BBC Two, a post he secured. By early December 1963, he had already worked on programmes such as Compact, Dr. Finlay's Casebook, and other drama presentations. On 4 December, one of his poems, "A man in a crowd", was broadcast on BBC radio (Midland Region) in the programme Midland Poets. During an interview with the Stamford Mercury on 6 December, Bayldon commented on his appointment at the BBC: "Looking back, I think I was very fortunate in getting the right sort of grounding from Mr. Walter Douglas at Stamford School."

On 20 March 1964, another of his poems was read in the BBC Home Service's Midland Poets, at 9 pm. In December of that year, The Stage announced that Durwell Productions Ltd. were planning a March or April 1965 presentation of a new musical, Cupid & Psyche, with book and lyrics by Glyn Idris Jones and music by Kenny Clayton, and that Bayldon was scheduled to be the designer. He drew up sets and costumes for this show, which was never staged. In March 1965, Bayldon released his first book of verse, The Paper Makers Craft, published by Twelve by Eight Paper Mill & Private Press in Leicester, the only place in England where paper was still made by hand. The collection included his own free translation (Note: In his 2012 book, The Art & Craft of Handmade Paper, author Vance Studley wrote: "Oliver Bayldon has freely translated a papermaker's Latin poem from the seventeenth century, that in part reads: 'The blocks begin their hobnail dance/and rising, falling tramp in rows,/stumping on like thunder butts/that crash and rush, and rip and rend/until foundations tremble and sway/buffeting the air around. (...)'. The poem is highly flavoured with the kind of activity which is so essential to good paper beating (...).") of a 17th-century Latin poem, "Papyrus", by Father Imberdis S.J. of Ambert, the papermaking district of the Auvergne in France. (Note: The reviewer for the Stamford Mercury wrote: "Mr. Oliver Bayldon (...) has had published a book of verse, The Paper Makers Craft. Mr. Bayldon, who has had verse broadcast and published over a number of years, chanced one day to visit a small paper mill, and he watched entranced the transmutation of growing things into sheets of textured paper. He subsequently returned to the mill at Leicester with sacks of stalks, roots and leaves, and stayed to turn them into paper. Later he brought to the paper maker verses, his own free translation of a 17th century Latin poem "Papyrus" by Father Imberdis S.J. of Ambert, the papermaking district of the Auvergne in France. Some of the coloured paper in the book (price £5 5s.) was made at the Twelve by Eight mill in Leicester, the only place in England where paper is still made by hand.")

==== 1966–1973 ====
In 1966, Bayldon stage designed four episodes in the BBC television series Quick Before They Catch Us, which aired in September. He also designed episodes 99 and 100 of The Newcomers, and seven episodes of Meet the Wife. The following year, he designed three episodes each for Thirty-Minute Theatre and Room at the Bottom, one episode, "Hughie", for Comedy Playhouse (Series 6), and one episode, "Bohuslav Martinů 1890–1959", for BBC2's Workshop programme (replayed on BBC1's Omnibus programme the following year). In 1968, he designed five episodes for Till Death Us Do Part, three for Beggar My Neighbour, seven for The Railway Children, and one episode on Sir Tyrone Guthrie for An Evening with....

In 1969, he designed one episode, "These Men Are Dangerous: Mussolini", for the Thirty-Minute Theatre programme, three episodes each for The Troubleshooters and Dad's Army, all six episodes of The Gnomes of Dulwich—for which he and his colleague Peter Brachacki had to create giant-size scenery to surround the two garden gnomes portrayed by Terry Scott and Hugh Lloyd—and three episodes of The Battle of St. George Without. In 1970, Bayldon designed one episode of Not in Front of the Children, four episodes each for Oh Brother! and The Troubleshooters, and two episodes each of Comedy Playhouse (Series 10) and Z-Cars. In 1971, he designed one episode, "Waugh Plays Cops and Robbers", for Thirty-Minute Theatre, and eight more episodes of Z-Cars.

In October 1971, the BBC began broadcasting the first series of The Onedin Line, for which Bayldon had designed six episodes, as well as another six episodes for the second series, aired in 1972. The filming in Exeter and Dartmouth involved many dramatic incidents at sea, for one of which he created a specially constructed steam pinnace, a period steamship complete with a 13-foot high funnel and a large boiler. (Note: "The experimental steam pinnace, Vessel, (...) was reconstructed by designer Oliver Bayldon and shipping master Gerry Poolman in the Tumchappel shipyard, Plymouth. Fully practical, the small steamer was able to outrun the sailing ship Tectona manned by cadets from Plymouth School of Maritime Studies.") Other scenes included a storm at sea and a ship on fire. The creation of bustling Victorian markets and docks presented many problems for the designer because any modern additions had either to be removed or hidden. This meant the complete removal of street signs, the covering of shop fronts, and even, on one occasion, the repainting of an entire house façade.

In February 1972, Bayldon was nominated in a short list of four television designers for the BAFTA award of Best Design of the Year for his work on The Onedin Line series. During this time, Bayldon also designed 17 individual costumes (plus nine design studies, each with several costume sketches) for the Goths and Bulgars in Donizetti's Belisario, which was produced by the Royal Academy of Music on the occasion of its 150th anniversary celebrations and performed at the Sadler's Wells Theatre, on 8 to 11 March. From 25 August to 17 September, he presented illustrations of his set and costume designs—including stage sets for Il Trovatore and The Magic Flute—in an exhibition entitled Stage and Television Designs at the Herbert Art Gallery, Coventry. In February 1973, Bayldon and the entire BBC Design Team were nominated for a second BAFTA Television Design Award for The Onedin Line. In June, the BBC broadcast one episode, "Three's One", with Bayldon's design for the programme Play for Today, followed, in September and October, by four episodes of The Dragon's Opponent.

==== 1974–1979 ====
In early 1974, the BBC broadcast four episodes of The Liver Birds, with sets designed by Bayldon. In March and April 1975, BBC2 aired The Fight Against Slavery, a six-part dramatised documentary co-produced with Time Life, written by Evan Jones and directed by Christopher Ralling, with sets designed by Bayldon. This series was filmed on location in the West Country, West Africa and Jamaica. (Note: In his biographical article, entitled "Creating a Visual Style" in The Veteran (Winter 2013), Bayldon wrote: "Its filming was a great experience, travelling from location to location, transforming an old steel barge in Freetown harbour, Sierra Leone, into a mock-up 18th century slaver's deck, all done by local African carpenters in oppressive heat".) Between October 1975 and January 1976, BBC1 showed the first series of Poldark, based on the novels by Winston Graham and starring Angharad Rees and Robin Ellis, for which Bayldon designed all sixteen episodes. Over fifty sets had to be built for the programme, and a large section of copper mine had to be constructed in the film studios for scenes which occur in later episodes. Bayldon also designed sets for the television film version of D. H. Lawrence's The Widowing of Mrs. Holroyd, shown on 5 May 1976. In late 1976, he produced designs for four episodes in the second series of When the Boat Comes In, for which he was once again nominated for a BAFTA award. (Note: The award nomination was shared with Richard Morris, Bernard Lloyd-Jones, Sue Spence, and Peter Brachacki.)

In 1977, Bayldon worked on the Velvet Glove series of dramatised biographies and designed those of Edith Cavell, Elizabeth Fry and the play on Lilian Baylis. In an interview with the Leicester Daily Mercury on 14 March 1977, Bayldon stated: "The research for these is often almost as interesting as the programmes themselves. It was somehow strange to be poring through boxes of Edith Cavell's private possessions or to search through treasured photographs at Lilian Baylis' original desk. The greatest challenge in these plays was to build a complete theatre in the studios, and also to recreate the horrors of Newgate prison in the 1800s." In April 1977, he produced designs for "A Choice of Evils", as part of Play for Today, followed, in October, by "Able's Will", for BBC2 Play of the Week. On 2 October, Gordon Burn interviewed Bayldon in an article for the Sunday Times Magazine entitled "All his own work – Ollie's living room sets the scene for the TV viewers", which explained Bayldon's approach to designing a living room for "Able's Will". During this period, he also designed costumes and sets for three short operas produced by the Royal Academy of Music for the Gala Opera Performance organised for the opening of the Sir Jack Lyons Theatre on 26 October 1977, inaugurated by HRH Princess Alice, Duchess of Gloucester, President of the RAM. These three pieces were: Henry Purcell's The Fairy Queen Act IV: The Masque of the Seasons, Gavin Ewart & John Gardner's Tobermory, and Gilbert & Sullivan's Trial by Jury, the latter after an interval. This performance was repeated on 28 and 31 October, and 1 November. At the end of the year, Bayldon created designs for all five episodes of the BBC's adaptation of Frederick Marryat's The Children of the New Forest, which aired in November and December.

In 1978, Bayldon made designs for "The Legion Hall Bombing", which aired in August for Play for Today, and worked on three episodes of Happy Ever After, starring Terry Scott and June Whitfield, shown in September and October. He designed The Dancing Princesses, broadcast in December, as a significantly modified television adaptation of the Brothers Grimm's fairy tale, directed by Ben Rea and featuring Jim Dale, Freddie Jones, and Gloria Grahame. During the latter part of 1978, Bayldon designed sets for the serialised TV adaptation of George Eliot's The Mill on the Floss, directed by Ronald Wilson and starring Christopher Blake, Pippa Guard, Judy Cornwell, Ray Smith and Anton Lesser; these eight episodes were broadcast from December 1978 to February 1979. In her review for The Stage on 4 January 1979, Jennifer Lovelace stated: "(...) So far, The Mill On The Floss is well up to standard. The quality of design (Oliver Bayldon) and costume (Caroline Maxwell) is sound and a little quickening of pace in future episodes will ensure that the traditions of the BBC Classic Serial are maintained."

==== 1980–1985 ====
On 22 March 1980, BBC2 Playhouse broadcast Rottingdean, with designs by Bayldon. It was written by Richard Crane, produced by Anne Head, and directed by Mark Cullingham, starring Pat Heywood, Trevor Peacock and Roger Brierley. From March to June 1980, BBC2 aired the TV series A Question of Guilt, with two cases set in the 1800s, "Constance Kent" and "Adelaide Bartlett" (eight episodes each), for which Bayldon designed Victorian sets. During an interview with the Stamford Mercury on 16 May 1980, he said: "It was a problem to recreate locations which either no longer existed, or had been totally changed in the name of redevelopment. We took immense pains to be as accurate as possible even to reconstructing an 1860 railway compartment in a gutted carriage, and building a realistic Victorian earth privy among the bushes. I believe we have been faithful to the facts as they were recorded". He also designed the production of Shakespeare's The Merchant of Venice, directed by Jack Gold and produced by Jonathan Miller, which BBC2 aired on 17 December.

On 20 March 1981, BBC2 Playhouse broadcast Unity, a play by John Mortimer depicting Unity Mitford's time in Berlin, based on the biography by David Pryce-Jones. Produced by Louis Marks, directed by James Cellan Jones, and designed by Bayldon, it starred Lesley-Anne Down in the role of Mitford. Later in 1981, Bayldon produced designs for the TV serial adaptation of Rudyard Kipling's Stalky & Co., directed by Rodney Bennett and produced by Barry Letts. Starring Robert Addie and David Parfitt, it was broadcast on BBC1 in a series of six weekly episodes from 31 January to 7 March 1982. On 12 February 1982, BBC2 Playhouse broadcast A Shilling Life, written by Guy Meredith, produced by Rosemary Hill, directed by Michael Heffernan, and designed by Bayldon. It starred Eric Porter and Julie Covington.

Bayldon contributed elaborate sets (Note: In his 1992 essay published in Literature/Film Quarterly, Hardy M. Cook wrote: "(...) All four plays are staged on a single set based on English, "adventure playgrounds". This single set, however, changes dramatically over the course of the cycle. Starting in 1 Henry VI, brightly painted in primary colours and largely open, it includes catwalks, platforms, stairs, walls, and many doors. The cyclorama behind, containing brilliant golds, is conspicuous even through open doors. Most of the staging area is used, including the upper levels. Taken as a whole, the set acts as a textured backdrop for the play that is filled with many actors and much action. In 2 Henry VI, the set looks darker than it was for Part 1. As Oliver Bayldon, the set designer, notes, "It's still a play park but it's not a place for playing games any more, it's got sinister. It's gone very sombre and textured – it's almost as though it has been boarded up and whitewashed and the whitewash has gone grey". (...) At the beginning, some additional platforms have been erected, such as the one that opens the play, from which the actors enter (...). Gradually, these platforms disappear as the play proceeds. (...) In 3 Henry VI, the set gets darker still: "By Part 3 the adventure playground has become burned and charred – colours have been subdued to black and grey and the colour of charred timber". (...) One of the main doors through which the actors enter and depart is now battered and darkened. The only exceptions to the bleakness of the set are the scenes at the French court. By the time of Richard III, the set has become very enclosed. Free standing doors now fill in once open spaces, and the rope netting is looped up, suggesting dark clouds. The upper stages and stairs are seldom used. The entire set looks very dark, dominated by dark browns with only an occasional splash of colour. Unquestionably, Howell conceived of the progress through the tetralogy as a darkening one, reflecting "a historical development from an age of chivalry to an age of conscienceless, ruthless killing, a breakdown in order and ethics".) for Shakespeare's first tetralogy (the Henry VI plays and Richard III) directed by Jane Howell and produced by Jonathan Miller, with costumes by John Peacock. Among the well-known television actors featured were: Julia Foster, Annette Crosbie, Frank Middlemass, Tenniel Evans, Trevor Peacock, and Bernard Hill. This project delivered four films aired on BBC2 as part of the BBC Television Shakespeare series, on successive Sundays throughout January 1983. About his decision to use a modern parquet floor as a deliberate violation of illusionist representation, Bayldon explained: "It stops the set from literally representing; it reminds us we are in a modern television studio." Stanley Wells commended this aspect of the production: "Jane Howell has dared to encourage us to remember that the action is taking place in a studio." In May 1983, Bayldon designed the BBC's TV adaptation of J.B. Priestley's Dangerous Corner for the programme Play of the Month.

In February and March 1984, Bayldon was the designer for the last seven (of thirteen) episodes of the TV adaptation of C. P. Snow's Strangers and Brothers. Later that year, he designed the set for BBC1's Review of the Year 1984, presented by Frank Bough and Selina Scott on 27 December. In March 1985, Bayldon designed the three-part adaptation of Oscar, starring Michael Gambon as Oscar Wilde during his trials and time in prison. Bayldon designed episode 9, "Windfall", for the second series of Big Deal, which aired in October, and also worked on the adaptation of Noël Coward's Star Quality: Me and the Girls, directed by Jack Gold and starring Tom Courtenay and Nichola McAuliffe, broadcast on 1 December 1985.

==== 1986–1991 ====
In 1986, Bayldon was made a Fellow of the Chartered Society of Designers. That year, he designed two consecutive episodes for the programme ScreenPlay: "The Mozart Inquest" and "The Marlowe Inquest", directed by Anthony Garner, which aired on 27 August and 3 September. In 1987, he designed the second of three episodes of Gaudy Night, (Note: The first and third episodes of Gaudy Night were designed by Barbara Gosnold, and aired on 13 and 27 May 1987, respectively.) starring Edward Petherbridge, Harriet Walter, and Richard Morant, and directed by Michael Simpson from Philip Broadley's adaptation of Dorothy L. Sayers's Lord Peter Wimsey novel of the same name; this second episode was broadcast on 20 May 1987.

In January 1989, BBC2 aired The Dark Angel, a three-part television adaptation of J. Sheridan Le Fanu's Uncle Silas, starring Peter O'Toole, Beatie Edney, Simon Shepherd, and Jane Lapotaire. In an article for Variety Television Reviews (1991–92), the reviewer—"Tone"—wrote: "Oliver Bayldon's rich design gives the production substance and finality." Writing about The Dark Angel for the Los Angeles Times, Ray Loynd wrote: "Don Macpherson's script is wafer-thin, genre period melodrama. But the nightmare is salvaged by O'Toole and production designer Oliver Bayldon's sickly rich decay."

In 1990, Bayldon designed sets for Never Come Back, a three-part crime drama created by David Pirie and starring Nathaniel Parker, James Fox, Jonathan Coy, Suzanna Hamilton, and Ingrid Lacey, aired on BBC2 over three successive Wednesdays from 21 March 1990. On 20 September, BBC2's Arena showed "Agatha Christie – Unfinished Portrait" for which Bayldon had designed and illustrated dramatic inserts highlighting incidents in Christie's childhood, including a nightmare sequence and a drawing of the novelist reading to her grandmother from a newspaper in the 1890s. On 12 October, Bayldon won a Royal Television Society Design Award for his work on Never Come Back, and was presented with his award by news presenter Sue Lawley at the London Hilton Hotel. Also in 1990, Bayldon produced sets for all seven episodes of the first series of On the Up, a situation comedy written by Bob Larbey and starring Dennis Waterman, Sam Kelly, Joan Sims, Jenna Russell, and Judy Buxton. The first series was shown on successive Tuesdays from 4 September to 16 October 1990.

In 1991, Bayldon created designs for "Do Not Disturb", an episode aired on 17 March 1991 in series seven of the BBC2 programme Screen Two, produced by Simon Passmore and directed by Nicholas Renton, and starring Frances Barber, Peter Capaldi, and Éva Darlan. In 1992, Bayldon was production designer for the BBC's adaptation of Muriel Spark's novel Memento Mori, directed by Jack Clayton and starring Dame Maggie Smith, Dame Thora Hird, Sir Michael Hordern, Stephanie Cole, and Zoë Wanamaker. This TV film was first broadcast on BBC2's Screen Two on 19 April 1992, and was awarded six nominations for the BAFTA Awards, with Bayldon winning in the Best TV Production Design category.

==== 1992–1995 ====
On 15 September 1992, BBC1's Omnibus programme broadcast "Angela Carter's Curious Room", a profile of the novelist and writer Angela Carter, filmed in the last months before her death. Bayldon was the designer, and his drawing of Carter's 1950 living room in Balham was published in the September 1992 edition of House & Garden. The following month, Bayldon was the production designer for "Seconds Out", an episode about the world of unlicensed boxing, broadcast on 4 October as part of series four of the BBC's Screen One anthology drama series.

In 1993, Bayldon created sets for two episodes of BBC2's Scene series for teenagers; the first, Dear Life, written by Sue Glover and directed by Jane Howell, was broadcast on 19 March; the second was a play by Tom Stoppard, A Separate Peace, which aired a week later. Later that year, Bayldon was production designer for "The Maitlands", the first episode in the third series of BBC2's Performance programme. It was directed by Lindsay Posner and produced by Simon Curtis, and aired on 13 November 1993, starring Eileen Atkins, Jennifer Ehle, Bill Nighy, Edward Fox, and Samuel West. In 1994, Bayldon designed sets for "Return to Blood River", the seventh episode in the tenth series of BBC2's Screen Two programme. It was directed by Jane Howell and produced by Peter Goodchild, and aired on 13 April 1994, starring Kevin McNally, Warren Clarke, Frances Barber, and Samantha Bond.

In January 1995, Bayldon was credited as production designer on The Plant, a science fiction film shown on BBC1, about an alien visitor to a London suburb; it was written and directed by Jonathan Lewis, and starred Joanna Roth, Valentine Pelka, and Eoin McCarthy. Later that year, Bayldon held his fourth exhibition on design visuals and illustrations for television and film at the British Academy of Film & Television Arts, 195 Piccadilly, London, from 9 October to 11 November.

=== 1996–1997: Freelance ===
After going freelance when the BBC downsized, (Note: At its peak in the 1990s, the BBC Scenic Design Department employed over 130 designers, plus freelancers, before being shut down by the then-Director-General of the BBC, John Birt.) Bayldon returned as production designer for Into the Fire, a three-part television thriller drama mini-series first shown on BBC1 on 14 February 1996 for three consecutive nights; it was written by Tony Marchant, directed by Jane Howell, and starred Donal McCann, David Morrissey, Sharon Duce, and Sue Johnston. Two months later, Bayldon held his fifth exhibition, entitled Arts in the Vaults, at the Royal Society of Arts, 8 John Adam Street, London WC2, from 26 April until 26 July.

Bayldon's final project as a production designer was Wokenwell, a six-part television crime drama series, broadcast on ITV from 18 May to 22 June 1997. The series was created by screenwriter Bill Gallagher and produced by LWT, starring Ian McElhinney, Celia Imrie, Nicholas Gleaves, Lesley Dunlop, Jason Done and Nicola Stephenson.

=== Writing career ===
Bayldon retired from designing in 1997, and continued to write. Between 1987 and 1991, some of his short stories had already been read on the BBC Radio 4 programme, Morning Story: "Moya" (1987), "Model Responses New York Style" (1988), "Introductions à la Mode" (1988), "City Column" (1989), "Away from It All" (1989), "Sideways Promotion" (1989), and "Home from Home" (1991).

In addition to the two books already published in the 1960s, The Paper Makers Craft (1965) and Enigma I (1969), he wrote two more books: Acts of Defiance (2013) and Darkly Blows the Harmattan: Short Stories (2015). In 2013, he contributed illustrations to Mike Sharland's The Digby Stories.

Bayldon also wrote articles for magazines, following on from the four articles published in the Stamford Mercury (1961), in which he had related his experiences during a 14-weeks study tour in the US. In retirement, he wrote two articles for The Veteran, summarising his professional experiences: Creating a Visual Style (2013), and Filming in Perspective (2014). He also wrote three articles in Prospero: Memories: Ealing Studios remembered (2015), as well as obituaries for his colleagues Peter Hammond, actor and director (2011), and John Hurst, Senior TV production designer (2016).

== Selected works ==
=== Stage ===
While at Stamford School, Bayldon designed sets for plays performed at the School Hall:

- Coriolanus (1953)
- The Government Inspector (1954)
- The Boy with a Cart (1955)
- Henry IV, Part 1 (1955)
- Charley's Aunt (1956)
- The Frogs (1957)

While at Leicester College of Art, Bayldon designed sets or costumes for:

- My Fair Lady (1958) – Sir Jonathan North Endowment Scheme art competition
- Peer Gynt (1960) – Malvern Drama Club

In the 1960s, Bayldon designed costumes and sets for the Northampton Repertory Theatre:

- Guilty Party (1962)
- Murder at Quay Cottage (1962)
- Babes in the Wood (1962–1963)
- The Shiny Surface (1963)
- Write Me a Murder (1963)
- Go Back For Murder (1963)

In the 1970s, Bayldon designed costumes and sets for four operas produced by the Royal Academy of Music:

- Belisario (1972) – costumes only
- The Fairy Queen Act IV: The Masque of the Seasons (1977) – set only
- Tobermory (1977) – set and costumes
- Trial by Jury (1977) – set and costumes

=== Television ===
Bayldon was production designer for the following television programmes (except where indicated):

- Quick Before They Catch Us (1966 TV Series) – 4 episodes
- The Newcomers (1965–1969 TV Series) – 2 episodes (1966)
- Meet the Wife (1966 TV Series) – 7 episodes
- Thirty-Minute Theatre (1967–1971 TV Series) – 5 episodes
- Room at the Bottom (1967 TV Mini Series) – 3 episodes
- Comedy Playhouse (1967–1970 TV Series) – 3 episodes
- Workshop (1967–1975 TV Series) – 1 episode (1967)
- Till Death Us Do Part (1968 TV Series) – 4 episodes
- Beggar My Neighbour (1968 TV Series) – 3 episodes
- The Railway Children (1968 TV Mini Series) – 7 episodes
- An Evening with... (1968 TV Series) – 1 episode
- The Troubleshooters (1969–1970 TV Series) – 7 episodes
- Dad's Army (1969 TV Series) – 3 episodes
- The Gnomes of Dulwich (1969 TV Series) – 6 episodes
- The Battle of St. George Without (1969 TV Series) – 3 episodes
- Not in Front of the Children (1970 TV Series) – 1 episode
- Oh Brother! (1970 TV Series) – 4 episodes
- Z Cars (1970–1972 TV Series) – 11 episodes
- The Onedin Line (1971–1972 TV Series) – 12 episodes
- Doomwatch (1972 TV Series) – 1 episode
- Play for Today (1973–1978 TV Series) – 3 episodes
- The Dragon's Opponent (1973 TV Series) – 4 episodes
- The Liver Birds (1974 TV Series) – 4 episodes
- The Fight Against Slavery (1975 TV Mini Series) – 6 episodes
- Poldark (1975–1976 TV Series) – 16 episodes
- The Widowing of Mrs. Holroyd (1976 TV Movie)
- When the Boat Comes In (1976–1977 TV Series) – 4 episodes
- The Velvet Glove (1977 TV Series) – 3 episodes
- BBC2 Play of the Week (1977 TV Series) – 1 episode
- The Children of the New Forest (1977 TV Series) – 5 episodes
- Happy Ever After (1978 TV Series) – 3 episodes
- The Dancing Princesses (1978 TV Movie)
- The Mill on the Floss (1978–1979 TV Mini Series) – 8 episodes
- BBC2 Playhouse (1980–1982 TV Series) – 3 episodes
- A Question of Guilt (1980–1982 TV Series) – 16 episodes
- The Merchant of Venice (1980 TV Movie)
- Stalky & Co. (1982 TV Mini Series) – 6 episodes
- Objects of Affection (1982 TV Series) – 1 episode
- The First Part of King Henry VI (1983 TV Movie)
- The Second Part of King Henry VI (1983 TV Movie)
- The Third Part of King Henry VI (1983 TV Movie)
- The Tragedy of Richard III (1983 TV Movie)
- BBC Play of the Month (1983 TV Series) – 1 episode
- Strangers and Brothers (1984 TV Series) – 9 episodes
- Oscar (1985 TV Series) – 3 episodes
- Big Deal (1985 TV Series) – 1 episode
- Me and the Girls (1985 TV Movie) – Art director
- The Paul Daniels Magic Show (1985 TV Series) – 1 episode
- ScreenPlay (1986 TV Series) – 2 episodes
- A Dorothy L. Sayers Mystery (1987 TV Series) – 1 episode
- An Affair in Mind (1988 TV Movie) – Art director
- The Dark Angel (1989 TV Mini Series) – 3 episodes
- Never Come Back (1990 TV Mini Series) – 3 episodes
- On the Up (1990 TV Series) – 7 episodes
- Arena (1990 TV Series) – 1 episode
- Screen Two (1991–1994 TV Series) – 3 episodes (incl. Memento Mori in 1992)
- Omnibus (1992 TV Series) – 1 episode
- Screen One (1992 TV Series) – 1 episode
- Scene (1968–2002 TV Series) – uncredited; 2 episodes (1993)
- Performance (1991–1998 TV Series) – Art Designer; 1 episode (1993)
- The Plant (1995 TV Movie)
- Into the Fire (1996 TV Mini Series) – 3 episodes
- Wokenwell (1997 TV Series) – 6 episodes

=== Radio ===
Bayldon wrote the following short stories, read on the BBC Radio 4 programme, Morning Story:

- "Moya" (30 September 1987) – Read by Peter Howell
- "Model Responses New York Style" (1 February 1988) – Read by Shelley Thompson
- "Introductions à la Mode" (5 December 1988) – Read by Daniel Webb
- "City Column" (25 January 1989) – Read by Alfred Molina
- "Away from It All" (8 February 1989) – Read by Joseph Marcell
- "Sideways Promotion" (12 April 1989) – Read by Geoffrey Whitehead
- "Home from Home" (16 October 1991) – Read by Seán Barrett

== Exhibitions ==
- Paintings and Stage Designs. Bookshop, King Street, Leicester (August 1959)
- Costume and Theatre Designs. Museum and Art Gallery, Northampton (23 February – 23 March 1963)
- Stage and Television Designs. Herbert Art Gallery, Coventry (25 August – 17 September 1972)
- Oliver Bayldon at 195. British Academy of Film and Television Arts, London W1 (9 October – 11 November 1995)
- Arts in the Vaults. Royal Society of Arts, London WC2 (26 April – 26 July 1996)

== Collections ==
- Bayldon's designs for opera are held in the public collections of the Royal Academy of Music, London. A collection of 45 costume and set designs by Bayldon from the 1970s can also be viewed on the Academy's website.
- The King Richard III Visitor Centre in Leicester has a collection of ten visuals—six of which are on permanent display—that Bayldon designed for the BBC's 1980s production of Shakespeare's Henry VI Parts 1-3 and The Tragedy of Richard III.

== Publications ==
=== Books ===
- The Paper Makers Craft (1965)
- Enigma I (1969) – Collective work, including four poems by Bayldon
- Acts of Defiance (2013)
- Darkly Blows the Harmattan: Short Stories (2015)

=== Articles ===
- Four articles about his 14-weeks US study tour (1961); published in the Stamford Mercury
- Obituaries: Peter Hammond (2011); published in Prospero
- Creating a Visual Style (2013); published in The Veteran
- Filming in Perspective (2014); published in The Veteran
- Memories: Ealing Studios remembered (2015); published in Prospero
- Obituaries: John Hurst (2016); published in Prospero

== Awards and fellowships ==
- Sir Jonathan North Endowment Scheme gold medal (1958)
- Royal Society of Arts / Industrial Art Bursary (1961)
- Fellow of the Royal Society of Arts (1961)
- Nominee of BAFTA Television Design Award for The Onedin Line (1972)
- Nominee of BAFTA Television Design Award (Note: The award nomination was shared with the Design Team.) for The Onedin Line (1973)
- Nominee of BAFTA Television Design Award for When the Boat Comes In (1977)
- Fellow of the Chartered Society of Designers (1986)
- Winner of RTS Best Production Design (Drama) Award for Never Come Back (1989)
- Winner of BAFTA Television Craft Design Award for Memento Mori (1993)

== Family connections ==
He is related to the actor Geoffrey Bayldon.

I don't really have a theatrical background, although I have a cousin Geoffrey Bayldon who's a well-known actor — but somehow the whole concept of creating sets appealed to me.

— Oliver Bayldon, in Man behind the scenes...behind the scenes by Pete Barraclough (1972)

== See also ==
- Costume design
- Prop design
- Scenic design
