= List of TV programmes with designs by Oliver Bayldon =

TV shows designed by Oliver Bayldon (1938–2019)

Oliver Bayldon FRSA, FCSD (12 September 1938 – 23 December 2019) was a London-based, award-winning British production designer who worked with the Northampton Repertory Theatre, the BBC, and the Royal Academy of Music. Between 1966 and 1997, he designed over 220 TV drama episodes and films.

== Television ==
The following table is an incomplete list of television programmes with sets designed by Oliver Bayldon; it provides the following information:

- Year – the year the TV programme was aired
- Programme – the title of the TV programme
- Type – the type of TV programme (TV Film, TV Series, TV Mini Series)
- Episode – the number or title of each TV programme episode
- Aired – the date the episode was shown on TV
- Ref. – one or more reference(s) for the programme or episode (this column is not sortable).

Year	Programme	Type	Episode	Aired	Ref.
1966	Quick Before They Catch Us	TV Series	"The Weasel Goes Pop: Part 1"	3 September 1966	
1966	Quick Before They Catch Us	TV Series	"The Weasel Goes Pop: Part 2"	10 September 1966	
1966	Quick Before They Catch Us	TV Series	"The Weasel Goes Pop: Part 3"	17 September 1966	
1966	Quick Before They Catch Us	TV Series	"The Weasel Goes Pop: Part 4"	24 September 1966	
1966	The Newcomers	TV Series	Ep. 99	13 September 1966	
1966	The Newcomers	TV Series	Ep. 100	16 September 1966	
1966	Meet the Wife (Series 5)	TV Series	Ep. 7: "Old Time Dancing"	7 November 1966	
1966	Meet the Wife (Series 5)	TV Series	Ep. 8: "The Schoolboy"	14 November 1966	
1966	Meet the Wife (Series 5)	TV Series	Ep. 9: "The Homework"	21 November 1966	
1966	Meet the Wife (Series 5)	TV Series	Ep. 10: "The Nasty Sleeper"	28 November 1966	
1966	Meet the Wife (Series 5)	TV Series	Ep. 11: "Bless 'Em All"	5 December 1966	
1966	Meet the Wife (Series 5)	TV Series	Ep. 12: "This Christmas, Shop Early!"	12 December 1966	
1966	Meet the Wife (Series 5)	TV Series	Ep. 13: "Christmas Travel"	19 December 1966	
1967	Thirty-Minute Theatre	TV Series	"Turn Off If You Know the Ending"	15 February 1967	
1967	Thirty-Minute Theatre	TV Series	"Leave Me Alone"	2 October 1967	
1967	Thirty-Minute Theatre	TV Series	"Have It on the House"	6 November 1967	
1967	Room at the Bottom	TV Series	Ep. 2	21 March 1967	
1967	Room at the Bottom	TV Series	Ep. 5	11 April 1967	
1967	Room at the Bottom	TV Series	Ep. 6	18 April 1967	
1967	Comedy Playhouse (Series 6)	TV Series	Ep. 1: "Hughie"	19 May 1967	
1967	Workshop	TV Series	"Bohuslav Martinů 1890-1959"	8 October 1967	
1968	Till Death Us Do Part (Season 3)	TV Series	Ep. 1: "The Phone"	5 January 1968	
1968	Till Death Us Do Part (Season 3)	TV Series	Ep. 3: "Monopoly"	12 January 1968	
1968	Till Death Us Do Part (Season 3)	TV Series	Ep. 4: "The Funeral"	26 January 1968	
1968	Till Death Us Do Part (Season 3)	TV Series	Ep. 6: "The Puppy"	9 February 1968	
1968	Till Death Us Do Part (Season 3)	TV Series	Ep. 7: "Aunt Maud"	14 December 1968	
1968	Beggar My Neighbour (Series 3)	TV Series	Ep. 1: "Old Before My Time"	30 January 1968	
1968	Beggar My Neighbour (Series 3)	TV Series	Ep. 2: "Ask Me No Questions"	6 February 1968	
1968	Beggar My Neighbour (Series 3)	TV Series	Ep. 7: "What About the Workers?"	12 March 1968	
1968	The Railway Children	TV Mini Series	Ep. 1: "The Visitors"	12 May 1968	
1968	The Railway Children	TV Mini Series	Ep. 2: "The Coalminers"	19 May 1968	
1968	The Railway Children	TV Mini Series	Ep. 3: "The Message"	26 May 1968	
1968	The Railway Children	TV Mini Series	Ep. 4: "The Foreign Gentleman"	2 June 1968	
1968	The Railway Children	TV Mini Series	Ep. 5: "The Secret"	9 June 1968	
1968	The Railway Children	TV Mini Series	Ep. 6: "The Rescue"	16 June 1968	
1968	The Railway Children	TV Mini Series	Ep. 7: "The Meeting"	23 June 1968	
1968	An Evening with...	TV Series	"Sir Tyrone Guthrie"	4 October 1968	
1969	Thirty-Minute Theatre	TV Series	"These Men Are Dangerous: Mussolini"	20 January 1969	
1969	The Troubleshooters (Season 5)	TV Series	Ep. 3: "How Much is One Man Worth?"	20 January 1969	
1969	The Troubleshooters (Season 5)	TV Series	Ep. 4: "If He Hollers, Let Him Go"	27 January 1969	
1969	The Troubleshooters (Season 5)	TV Series	Ep. 22: "She'll Be Right Mate"	16 June 1969	
1969	Dad's Army (Series 2)	TV Series	Ep. 8: "The Battle of Godfrey's Cottage"	8 March 1969	
1969	Dad's Army (Series 2)	TV Series	Ep. 10: "Sgt. Wilson's Little Secret"	22 March 1969	
1969	Dad's Army (Series 2)	TV Series	Ep. 12: "Under Fire"	5 April 1969	
1969	The Gnomes of Dulwich	TV Series	Ep. 1	12 May 1969	
1969	The Gnomes of Dulwich	TV Series	Ep. 2	19 May 1969	
1969	The Gnomes of Dulwich	TV Series	Ep. 3	26 May 1969	
1969	The Gnomes of Dulwich	TV Series	Ep. 4	2 June 1969	
1969	The Gnomes of Dulwich	TV Series	Ep. 5	9 June 1969	
1969	The Gnomes of Dulwich	TV Series	Ep. 6	16 June 1969	
1969	The Battle of St. George Without	TV Series	"Part 1: The Secret Place"	15 December 1969	
1969	The Battle of St. George Without	TV Series	"Part 2: Guard Duties"	22 December 1969	
1969	The Battle of St. George Without	TV Series	"Part 3: St George's Day"	29 December 1969	
1970	Not in Front of the Children (Season 4)	TV Series	Ep. 16: "Home from Home"	2 January 1970	
1970	Oh Brother! (Series 3)	TV Series	Ep. 3: "The Laughter of a Fool"	30 January 1970	
1970	Oh Brother! (Series 3)	TV Series	Ep. 5: "The Hand of Esau"	13 February 1970	
1970	Oh Brother! (Series 3)	TV Series	Ep. 6: "A Stone of Stumbling"	20 February 1970	
1970	Oh Brother! (Series 3)	TV Series	Ep. 7: "The Fullness of His Days"	27 February 1970	
1970	The Troubleshooters (Season 6)	TV Series	Ep. 2: "A Pig in a Pipe"	25 May 1970	
1970	The Troubleshooters (Season 6)	TV Series	Ep. 5: "The Price of a Bride"	15 June 1970	
1970	The Troubleshooters (Season 6)	TV Series	Ep. 6: "Operation Black Gold"	22 June 1970	
1970	The Troubleshooters (Season 6)	TV Series	Ep. 16: "The Order of the Good Time"	31 August 1970	
1970	Comedy Playhouse (Series 10)	TV Series	Ep. 6: "The Old Contemptible"	15 July 1970	
1970	Comedy Playhouse (Series 10)	TV Series	Ep. 8: "Meter Maids"	5 August 1970	
1970	Z-Cars (Series 6)	TV Series	Ep. 375: "Playing for Keeps: Part 1"	14 December 1970	
1970	Z-Cars (Series 6)	TV Series	Ep. 376: "Playing for Keeps: Part 2"	15 December 1970	
1971	Thirty-Minute Theatre	TV Series	"Waugh Plays Cops and Robbers"	1 January 1971	
1971	Z-Cars (Series 6)	TV Series	Ep. 382: "Right of Way: Part 1"	11 January 1971	
1971	Z-Cars (Series 6)	TV Series	Ep. 383: "Right of Way: Part 2"	12 January 1971	
1971	Z-Cars (Series 6)	TV Series	Ep. 390: "The More We Are Together: Part 1"	8 February 1971	
1971	Z-Cars (Series 6)	TV Series	Ep. 391: "The More We Are Together: Part 2"	9 February 1971	
1971	Z-Cars (Series 6)	TV Series	Ep. 398: "The Snoozer: Part 1"	8 March 1971	
1971	Z-Cars (Series 6)	TV Series	Ep. 399: "The Snoozer: Part 2"	9 March 1971	
1971	Z-Cars (Series 6)	TV Series	Ep. 405: "It Can Get to Be a Habit: Part 1"	5 April 1971	
1971	Z-Cars (Series 6)	TV Series	Ep. 406: "It Can Get to Be a Habit: Part 2"	6 April 1971	
1971	The Onedin Line (Series 1)	TV Series	Ep. 1: "The Wind Blows Free"	15 October 1971	
1971	The Onedin Line (Series 1)	TV Series	Ep. 2: "Plain Salling"	22 October 1971	
1971	The Onedin Line (Series 1)	TV Series	Ep. 6: "Salvage"	19 November 1971	
1971	The Onedin Line (Series 1)	TV Series	Ep. 10: "A Very Important Passenger"	17 December 1971	
1972	The Onedin Line (Series 1)	TV Series	Ep. 13: "Shadow of Doubt"	14 January 1972	
1972	The Onedin Line (Series 1)	TV Series	Ep. 15: "Winner Take All"	28 January 1972	
1972	Z-Cars (Series 7)	TV Series	Ep. 48: "Canal"	21 February 1972	
1972	Doomwatch (Series 3)	TV Series	Ep. 6: "Hair Trigger"	10 July 1972	
1972	The Onedin Line (Series 2)	TV Series	Ep. 1: "The Hard Case"	17 September 1972	
1972	The Onedin Line (Series 2)	TV Series	Ep. 4: "Fetch and Carry"	8 October 1972	
1972	The Onedin Line (Series 2)	TV Series	Ep. 5: "Yellow Jack"	15 October 1972	
1972	The Onedin Line (Series 2)	TV Series	Ep. 9: "Beyond the Upper Sea"	19 November 1972	
1972	The Onedin Line (Series 2)	TV Series	Ep. 11: "Goodbye, Goodbye"	3 December 1972	
1972	The Onedin Line (Series 2)	TV Series	Ep. 14: "Race for Power"	31 December 1972	
1973	Play for Today	TV Series	"Three's One"	4 June 1973	
1973	The Dragon's Opponent	TV Series	Ep. 1: "Rebellion"	23 September 1973	
1973	The Dragon's Opponent	TV Series	Ep. 2: "Banishment"	30 September 1973	
1973	The Dragon's Opponent	TV Series	Ep. 3: "The Drawn Sword"	7 October 1973	
1973	The Dragon's Opponent	TV Series	Ep. 4: "The Battle"	14 October 1973	
1974	The Liver Birds (Series 4)	TV Series	Ep. 8: "Love Is"	27 February 1974	
1974	The Liver Birds (Series 4)	TV Series	Ep. 9: "Anyone for Freedom"	6 March 1974	
1974	The Liver Birds (Series 4)	TV Series	Ep. 11: "The Bride Went That-A 'Way"	20 March 1974	
1974	The Liver Birds (Series 4)	TV Series	Ep. 12: "Let Sleeping Dogs Lie"	27 March 1974	
1975	The Fight Against Slavery	TV Mini Series	Ep. 1: "The Old African Blasphemer"	19 March 1975	
1975	The Fight Against Slavery	TV Mini Series	Ep. 2: "One Man's Property"	26 March 1975	
1975	The Fight Against Slavery	TV Mini Series	Ep. 3: "A Matter of Insurance"	2 April 1975	
1975	The Fight Against Slavery	TV Mini Series	Ep. 4: "Tight Packers & Loose Packers"	9 April 1975	
1975	The Fight Against Slavery	TV Mini Series	Ep. 5: "A Grateful Peasantry"	16 April 1975	
1975	The Fight Against Slavery	TV Mini Series	Ep. 6: "Free Paper Come"	23 April 1975	
1975	Poldark (Series 1)	TV Series	Ep. 1	5 October 1975	
1975	Poldark (Series 1)	TV Series	Ep. 2	12 October 1975	
1975	Poldark (Series 1)	TV Series	Ep. 3	19 October 1975	
1975	Poldark (Series 1)	TV Series	Ep. 4	26 October 1975	
1975	Poldark (Series 1)	TV Series	Ep. 5	2 November 1975	
1975	Poldark (Series 1)	TV Series	Ep. 6	9 November 1975	
1975	Poldark (Series 1)	TV Series	Ep. 7	16 November 1975	
1975	Poldark (Series 1)	TV Series	Ep. 8	23 November 1975	
1975	Poldark (Series 1)	TV Series	Ep. 9	30 November 1975	
1975	Poldark (Series 1)	TV Series	Ep. 10	7 December 1975	
1975	Poldark (Series 1)	TV Series	Ep. 11	14 December 1975	
1975	Poldark (Series 1)	TV Series	Ep. 12	21 December 1975	
1975	Poldark (Series 1)	TV Series	Ep. 13	28 December 1975	
1976	Poldark (Series 1)	TV Series	Ep. 14	4 January 1976	
1976	Poldark (Series 1)	TV Series	Ep. 15	11 January 1976	
1976	Poldark (Series 1)	TV Series	Ep. 16	18 January 1976	
1976	The Widowing of Mrs. Holroyd	TV Movie	–	5 May 1976	
1976	When the Boat Comes In (Series 2)	TV Series	Ep. 2: "Tram Ride to the Bluebell"	5 November 1976	
1976	When the Boat Comes In (Series 2)	TV Series	Ep. 5: "Some Bulbs to Keep the Garden Bright"	26 November 1976	
1977	When the Boat Comes In (Series 2)	TV Series	Ep. 9: "After the Bonfire"	7 January 1977	
1977	When the Boat Comes In (Series 2)	TV Series	Ep. 11: "The Way it was in Murmansk"	21 January 1977	
1977	The Velvet Glove	TV Series	Ep. 1: "Happy in War"	26 January 1977	
1977	The Velvet Glove	TV Series	Ep. 4: "Beyond This Life"	16 February 1977	
1977	The Velvet Glove	TV Series	Ep. 6: "Auntie's Niece"	2 March 1977	
1977	Play for Today	TV Series	"A Choice of Evils"	19 April 1977	
1977	BBC2 Play of the Week	TV Series	"Able's Will"	5 October 1977	
1977	The Children of the New Forest	TV Series	"Part 1"	13 November 1977	
1977	The Children of the New Forest	TV Series	"Part 2"	20 November 1977	
1977	The Children of the New Forest	TV Series	"Part 3"	27 November 1977	
1977	The Children of the New Forest	TV Series	"Part 4"	4 December 1977	
1977	The Children of the New Forest	TV Series	"Part 5"	11 December 1977	
1978	Play for Today	TV Series	"The Legion Hall Bombing"	22 August 1978	
1978	Happy Ever After (Series 5)	TV Series	Ep. 4: "The King and June"	26 September 1978	
1978	Happy Ever After (Series 5)	TV Series	Ep. 5: "A Woman Called Ironside"	3 October 1978	
1978	Happy Ever After (Series 5)	TV Series	Ep. 6: "The More We Are Together"	10 October 1978	
1978	The Dancing Princesses	TV Movie	–	17 December 1978	
1978	The Mill on the Floss	TV Mini Series	Ep. 1	31 December 1978	
1979	The Mill on the Floss	TV Mini Series	Ep. 2	7 January 1979	
1979	The Mill on the Floss	TV Mini Series	Ep. 3	14 January 1979	
1979	The Mill on the Floss	TV Mini Series	Ep. 4	21 January 1979	
1979	The Mill on the Floss	TV Mini Series	Ep. 5	28 January 1979	
1979	The Mill on the Floss	TV Mini Series	Ep. 6	4 February 1979	
1979	The Mill on the Floss	TV Mini Series	Ep. 7	11 February 1979	
1979	The Mill on the Floss	TV Mini Series	Ep. 8	18 February 1979	
1980	BBC2 Playhouse	TV Series	"Rottingdean"	22 March 1980	
1980	A Question of Guilt	TV Series	Ep. 1: "Constance Kent: Part 1"	25 March 1980	
1980	A Question of Guilt	TV Series	Ep. 2: "Constance Kent: Part 2"	27 March 1980	
1980	A Question of Guilt	TV Series	Ep. 3: "Constance Kent: Part 3"	1 April 1980	
1980	A Question of Guilt	TV Series	Ep. 4: "Constance Kent: Part 4"	3 April 1980	
1980	A Question of Guilt	TV Series	Ep. 5: "Constance Kent: Part 5"	8 April 1980	
1980	A Question of Guilt	TV Series	Ep. 6: "Constance Kent: Part 6"	10 April 1980	
1980	A Question of Guilt	TV Series	Ep. 7: "Constance Kent: Part 7"	15 April 1980	
1980	A Question of Guilt	TV Series	Ep. 8: "Constance Kent: Part 8"	17 April 1980	
1980	A Question of Guilt	TV Series	Ep. 15: "Adelaide Bartlett: Part 1"	13 May 1980	
1980	A Question of Guilt	TV Series	Ep. 16: "Adelaide Bartlett: Part 2"	15 May 1980	
1980	A Question of Guilt	TV Series	Ep. 17: "Adelaide Bartlett: Part 3"	20 May 1980	
1980	A Question of Guilt	TV Series	Ep. 18: "Adelaide Bartlett: Part 4"	22 May 1980	
1980	A Question of Guilt	TV Series	Ep. 19: "Adelaide Bartlett: Part 5"	27 May 1980	
1980	A Question of Guilt	TV Series	Ep. 20: "Adelaide Bartlett: Part 6"	29 May 1980	
1980	A Question of Guilt	TV Series	Ep. 21: "Adelaide Bartlett: Part 7"	3 June 1980	
1980	A Question of Guilt	TV Series	Ep. 22: "Adelaide Bartlett: Part 8	5 June 1980	
1980	The Merchant of Venice	TV Movie	–	17 December 1980	
1981	BBC2 Playhouse	TV Series	"Unity"	20 March 1981	
1982	Stalky & Co.	TV Mini Series	Ep. 1: "An Unsavoury Interlude"	31 January 1982	
1982	Stalky & Co.	TV Mini Series	Ep. 2: "In Ambush"	7 February 1982	
1982	Stalky & Co.	TV Mini Series	Ep. 3: "Slaves of the Lamp"	14 February 1982	
1982	Stalky & Co.	TV Mini Series	Ep. 4: "The Moral Reformers"	21 February 1982	
1982	Stalky & Co.	TV Mini Series	Ep. 5: "A Little Prep"	28 February 1982	
1982	Stalky & Co.	TV Mini Series	Ep. 6: "The Last Term"	7 March 1982	
1982	BBC2 Playhouse	TV Series	"A Shilling Life"	12 February 1982	
1982	Objects of Affection	TV Series	Ep. 4: "Marks"	10 December 1982	
1983	The First Part of King Henry VI	TV Movie	–	2 January 1983	
1983	The Second Part of King Henry VI	TV Movie	–	9 January 1983	
1983	The Third Part of King Henry VI	TV Movie	–	16 January 1983	
1983	The Tragedy of Richard III	TV Movie	–	23 January 1983	
1983	BBC Play of the Month	TV Series	"Dangerous Corner"	22 May 1983	
1984	Strangers and Brothers	TV Series	Ep. 7	22 February 1984	
1984	Strangers and Brothers	TV Series	Ep. 8	29 February 1984	
1984	Strangers and Brothers	TV Series	Ep. 9	7 March 1984	
1984	Strangers and Brothers	TV Series	Ep. 10	14 March 1984	
1984	Strangers and Brothers	TV Series	Ep. 11	21 March 1984	
1984	Strangers and Brothers	TV Series	Ep. 12	28 March 1984	
1984	Strangers and Brothers	TV Series	Ep. 13	4 April 1984	
1984	Review of the Year 1984	TV Series	–	27 December 1984	
1985	Oscar	TV Series	Ep. 1: "Gilded Youth"	26 March 1985	
1985	Oscar	TV Series	Ep. 2: "Trials"	27 March 1985	
1985	Oscar	TV Series	Ep. 3: "De Profundis"	28 March 1985	
1985	Big Deal (Series 2)	TV Series	Ep. 9: "Windfall"	29 October 1985	
1985	Star Quality: Me and the Girls	TV Movie	–	1 December 1985	
1985	The Paul Daniels Magic Show	TV Series	Ep. 7.11	26 December 1985	
1986	ScreenPlay (Series 1)	TV Series	Ep. 8: "The Mozart Inquest"	27 August 1986	
1986	ScreenPlay (Series 1)	TV Series	Ep. 9: "The Marlowe Inquest"	3 September 1986	
1987	A Dorothy L. Sayers Mystery	TV Series	"Gaudy Night: Episode 2"	20 May 1987	
1988	An Affair in Mind	TV Movie	–	5 January 1988	
1989	The Dark Angel	TV Mini Series	Ep. 1	4 January 1989	
1989	The Dark Angel	TV Mini Series	Ep. 2	11 January 1989	
1989	The Dark Angel	TV Mini Series	Ep. 3	18 January 1989	
1990	Never Come Back	TV Mini Series	Ep. 1	21 March 1990	
1990	Never Come Back	TV Mini Series	Ep. 2	28 March 1990	
1990	Never Come Back	TV Mini Series	Ep. 3	4 April 1990	
1990	On the Up (Series 1)	TV Series	Ep. 1: "Walking Out"	4 September 1990	
1990	On the Up (Series 1)	TV Series	Ep. 2: "Mum"	11 September 1990	
1990	On the Up (Series 1)	TV Series	Ep. 3: "Mr. Burton"	18 September 1990	
1990	On the Up (Series 1)	TV Series	Ep. 4: "Dawn"	25 September 1990	
1990	On the Up (Series 1)	TV Series	Ep. 5: "Maggie's Dad"	2 October 1990	
1990	On the Up (Series 1)	TV Series	Ep. 6: "Douglas"	9 October 1990	
1990	On the Up (Series 1)	TV Series	Ep. 7: "Barbados"	16 October 1990	
1990	Arena	TV Series	"Agatha Christie - Unfinished Portrait"	20 September 1990	
1991	Screen Two (Series 7)	TV Series	Ep. 9: Do Not Disturb	17 March 1991	
1992	Screen Two (Series 8)	TV Series	Ep. 13: Memento Mori	19 April 1992	
1992	Omnibus (Season 30)	TV Series	Ep. 2: "Angela Carter's Curious Room"	15 September 1992	
1992	Screen One (Series 4)	TV Series	Ep. 5: "Seconds Out"	4 October 1992	
1993	Scene	TV Series	Dear Life	19 March 1993	
1993	Scene	TV Series	A Separate Peace	26 March 1993	
1993	Performance (Season 3)	TV Series	Ep. 1: "The Maitlands"	13 November 1993	
1994	Screen Two (Series 10)	TV Series	Ep. 7: "Return to Blood River"	13 April 1994	
1995	The Plant	TV Movie	–	20 January 1995	
1996	Into the Fire	TV Mini Series	Ep. 1	14 February 1996	
1996	Into the Fire	TV Mini Series	Ep. 2	15 February 1996	
1996	Into the Fire	TV Mini Series	Ep. 3	16 February 1996	
1997	Wokenwell	TV Series	Ep. 1: "Meat is Murder"	18 May 1997	
1997	Wokenwell	TV Series	Ep. 2: "Gentleman of the Road"	25 May 1997	
1997	Wokenwell	TV Series	Ep. 3: "Flash Harry's Stalker"	1 June 1997	
1997	Wokenwell	TV Series	Ep. 4: "Misery Memoir"	8 June 1997	
1997	Wokenwell	TV Series	Ep. 5: "The Postman Strikes Twice"	15 June 1997	
1997	Wokenwell	TV Series	Ep. 6: "Gone Fishing"	22 June 1997	
