= Esmonde and Larbey =

British television comedy scriptwriting duo

- Born: John Gilbert Esmonde; 21 March 1937; Battersea, London, England; Robert Edward Larbey; 24 June 1934; Clapham, London, England
- Died: John Gilbert Esmonde; 10 August 2008 (aged 71); Spain; Robert Edward Larbey; 31 March 2014 (aged 79); London, England
- Notable work: Please Sir! The Good Life; Get Some In! Ever Decreasing Circles; Brush Strokes

Comedy career
- Years active: 1965–2005 (as collaboration)
- Medium: Screenwriter
- Genre: Television

Esmonde and Larbey were a British television screenwriting duo, consisting of John Gilbert Esmonde (21 March 1937 – 10 August 2008) and Robert Edward Larbey (24 June 1934 – 31 March 2014), who created popular sitcoms from the mid-1960s until the mid-1990s such as Please Sir!, The Good Life, Get Some In!, Ever Decreasing Circles, and Brush Strokes.

== Biographies ==
Bob Larbey made his writing debut for BBC radio, before contributing a film adaptation, Mrs Silly, starring Maggie Smith. Larbey met his future writing partner when they were pupils at Henry Thornton School, South Side, Clapham Common. He was born in Clapham, South London and died in London aged 79 in March 2014.

John Esmonde served a couple of years in the Royal Air Force in Air Ambulance before realising that his budding writing partnership with Larbey might prove more fruitful. Three years of after-hours writing yielded a BBC joint fee of two guineas for the pair in 1965, as they began to have sketches accepted on shows such as I'm Sorry, I'll Read That Again and The Dick Emery Show. Born in Battersea, South West London, Esmonde was married to Georgina Barton from 1960 until his death in Spain in August 2008, aged 71.

== Collaboration ==
Esmonde and Larbey's first sitcom as a writing team came in 1966 with Room at the Bottom for the BBC. This followed the exploits of a group of maintenance men working for Saracens Manufacturing Company. Starting out as a pilot in the BBC's Comedy Playhouse programme, it lasted for one series the next year, starring Kenneth Connor, Deryck Guyler and Francis Matthews.

The BBC radio comedy You're Only Old Once, also starring Deryck Guyler who appeared alongside Clive Dunn and Joan Sanderson, was broadcast between February 1968 and July 1969.

Also in 1968, Esmonde and Larbey created Please Sir!, a situation comedy which starred John Alderton as a naive teacher thrown in at the deep end in a tough south London school. Rejected by the BBC, the series was accepted by London Weekend Television, whose head of comedy was then Frank Muir.

The success of Please Sir! led to Esmonde and Larbey being commissioned to write a sequel – The Fenn Street Gang – which followed the former school pupils as they tried to make their way in the harsh world outside. This starred David Barry, Peter Cleall and Carol Hawkins. Making his debut in series 1, George Baker made such an impression as a wide-boy villain that the prequel Bowler was launched in 1973. This lasted for one series and co-starred Fred Beauman, Renny Lister and Gretchen Franklin.

In the early to mid-1970s, Esmonde and Larbey produced several lesser-known comedies, sometimes lasting no longer than a pilot. These include ITV's Cosmo And Thingy, set in prehistoric times featuring a cast of cavemen and cavewomen (based on a series of sketches they wrote for I'm Sorry, I'll Read That Again), and Football Crazy (also for ITV) which was a children's sitcom about the football team Wormwood Rovers.

In 1975, Esmonde and Larbey created their best-known situation comedy: The Good Life, starring Richard Briers, Felicity Kendal, Paul Eddington and Penelope Keith. Set in Surbiton, London, it concerns itself with the attempts of Tom and Barbara Good (Briers and Kendal) to be self-sufficient after they decide to leave the rat race. It ran on the BBC until 1978, although it is still regularly repeated. At its peak, the show was attracting some 15 million viewers per week – nearly a quarter of the population at the time. The writers had "just picked it [Surbiton] at random", Larbey once admitted. "To be honest, we were just looking for something that sounded like suburbia in big capital letters." The show poked fun at the ideologies of both lead couples – the aggressively socially climbing Leadbetters and the self-sufficient (and self-satisfied) Goods. Larbey later said that while he was too impractical to embrace self-sufficiency, its general philosophy appealed to him.

Also beginning in 1975 was Get Some In! for ITV, a national service comedy set in 1955. It starred Tony Selby, Robert Lindsay, David Janson and Gerard Ryder.

Esmonde and Larbey teamed up with Michael Gambon and Briers again for another BBC Comedy Series called The Other One (1977–79), a sitcom about a man who is a liar who attempts to hide his insecurities through charade; it was successful enough for a second series to be broadcast. They returned to football with ITV's Feet First (1979) starring Jonathan Barlow as Terry Prince, a local footballer given the chance to hit the big time. Also less successful than The Good Life was their sitcom for ITV Just Liz (1980) starring Sandra Payne. This was followed by Don't Rock The Boat (1982–83) which starred Nigel Davenport.

After the short-lived Now and Then (ITV 1983–84) they returned to form with Ever Decreasing Circles, which reunited the writers with Briers. Briers starred as Martin Bryce, an insecure and obsessive character whose need to be the leading light of local activities is undermined by the arrival of a talented and charming neighbour, Paul Ryman. The series also featured Penelope Wilton as Martin's long suffering wife Anne, and Peter Egan as Ryman.

Another hit for Esmonde and Larbey was Brush Strokes (1986–91), featuring Karl Howman and Gary Waldhorn as a house decorator and his boss. The BBC sitcom Double First (1988) only lasted one series, but marked a different approach. It starred Michael Williams.

The duo wrote Hope It Rains (1991–92) for ITV. It starred Tom Bell as the dour owner of a run-down seaside waxworks museum. Holly Aird and Eamon Boland also featured. There were 13 episodes transmitted.

Their last significant sitcom as a team was Mulberry (1992–93), again starring Karl Howman, here as an apprentice Grim Reaper who has to guide an elderly spinster (Geraldine McEwan) to the next world as easily as possible.

=== Larbey's solo work ===
By this time Larbey was also solo-writing the long-running BBC series As Time Goes By (1992–2005), starring Judi Dench and Geoffrey Palmer. While continuing his partnership with Esmonde, Larbey had been writing several sitcoms on his own throughout the 1980s and 1990s, most notably A Fine Romance starring Dench and her husband Michael Williams, which ran from 1981 to 1984. Along with the later As Time Goes By, these two series were credited with "catapulting Dench into the nation's affections" as they gave prime-time recognition to an actress who, until then, had largely confined herself to stage work and one-off TV dramas.

== TV credits ==
=== Collaborations ===
- The Dick Emery Show (1963)
- Spare a Copper (1965)
- Room at the Bottom (1966)
- Please Sir! (1968–1972)
- The Fenn Street Gang (1971–1973)
- Cosmo and Thingy (1972)
- Bowler (1973)
- Football Crazy (1974)
- Get Some In! (1975–1978)
- The Good Life (1975–1978)
- The Other One (1977–1979)
- Three Piece Suite (1977)
- Feet First (1979)
- Just Liz (1980)
- Don't Rock the Boat (1982–1983)
- Now and Then (1983–1984)
- Ever Decreasing Circles (1984–1989)
- Brush Strokes (1986–1991)
- Double First (1988)
- Hope It Rains (1991–1992)
- Mulberry (1992–1993)
- Down to Earth (1995)

=== Larbey without Esmonde ===
- A Fine Romance (1981–1984)
- The Curious Case of Santa Claus (1982)
- Age-Old Friends (1989), based on Larbey's play A Month of Sundays, first presented at The Nuffield Theatre in 1985 and winner of the London Evening Standard Award for Best Comedy of 1986
- On the Up (1990–1992)
- As Time Goes By (1992–2005)
- My Good Friend (1995–1996)
- Ain't Misbehavin' (1997)
