= Room at the Bottom =

Room at the Bottom may refer to:

- Room at the Bottom (Dad's Army), an episode of the British comedy series Dad's Army
- Room at the Bottom (1967 TV series), a British comedy television series
- Room at the Bottom (1986 TV series), a British comedy television series

== See also ==
- There's Plenty of Room at the Bottom, a lecture given by physicist Richard Feynman
