= Double First =

Double First is a 1988 British television sitcom that aired seven episodes on BBC 1. Written by the comedy writing duo Esmonde and Larbey, the series was directed by Gareth Gwenlan. It starred Michael Williams as N. V. Standish, Ann Bell as Mary Webster, Jennifer Hilary as Louise Hobson, Holly Aird as Ellen Hobson, Clive Merrison as Derek, and Peter Tuddenham as William.
