= Peter Tuddenham =

British actor

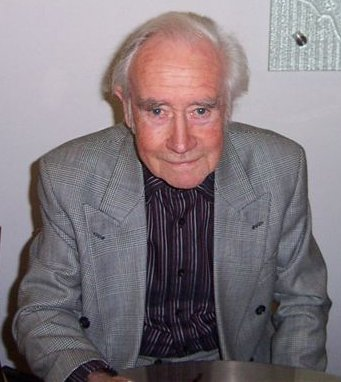
- Peter Tuddenham at the launch of the Blake's 7 second series DVD, 2005
- Born: 27 November 1918; Ipswich, Suffolk, England
- Died: 9 July 2007 (aged 88); Worthing, West Sussex, England
- Occupation: Actor
- Years active: 1955–1995
- Known for: Blake's 7

Peter Tuddenham (27 November 1918 – 9 July 2007) was a British actor. He was well known for his voice work, which included the voices of the computers in the BBC science fiction series Blake's 7 (1978–1981).

== Life and career ==
Tuddenham was born in Ipswich, Suffolk, and raised in the nearby seaside town of Felixstowe. He made his professional debut before the Second World War, in repertory at Hastings. In the wartime Royal Army Service Corps, he appeared in Stars in Battledress.

After the war he joined a production of Ivor Novello's The Dancing Years; later, in 1959, BBC productions of this and another Novello musical, Perchance to Dream, were among his early television appearances. In 1950 he appeared in Noël Coward's Ace of Clubs, which had a moderate run in the West End.

Tuddenham first appeared on television in an early ITV production The Granville Melodramas (1955), with Hattie Jacques and John Le Mesurier. He had a regular role in Anglia Television's Weavers Green (1966), a short-lived, twice-weekly soap.

He provided the voice-over for Akenfield, Peter Hall's 1974 film treatment of Ronald Blythe's book. Tuddenham became the dialogue coach for Hall's 1985 production at Glyndebourne of Benjamin Britten's opera, Albert Herring, which was televised on BBC2.

Tuddenham appeared in radio dramas including the soap operas Mrs Dale's Diary and Waggoner's Walk, and became an off-screen voice in the Doctor Who stories The Ark in Space and The Masque of Mandragora, in 1975 and 1976. He was then cast in Blake's 7, providing the voices of the computers Orac and Zen. Tuddenham reprised his roles in revivals for radio.

In serious drama television drama Tuddenham frequently appeared in character roles, playing doctors and other figures of authority. Among these appearances were North and South (1975), The Lost Boys (1978), The Burston Rebellion (1985), and Anything More Would Be Greedy (1989), again for Anglia. In comedy he featured in Nearest and Dearest, Only Fools and Horses, One Foot in the Grave and Double First.

According to an obituarist, "Tuddenham remained a genial character, and was an unfailingly popular guest at sci-fi conventions." Rosie, his second wife, and their son Julian survive him, together with a son from his first marriage. Another son predeceased him.

== Filmography ==
Year	Title	Role	Notes
1975-1987	Doctor Who	Computer/Titan/Brain (voice)	3 episodes
1975	North and South	Dr. Lowe	Miniseries
1978-1981	Blake's 7	Zen/Orac/Slave (voice)	
1978	The Lost Boys	Dr. Rendel	Miniseries
1981-1982	Tales of the Unexpected	Control Voice/Tommy	2 episodes
1986	Lovejoy	Auctioneer	Episode: The Sting
1986	David Copperfield	Bootmaker	Miniseries
1986	Only Fools and Horses	Charles	Episode: A Royal Flush
1989	Campion	Pepper	2 episodes
1995	The Bill	Mr. Wilson	Episode: Smoke Gets in Your Eyes
