= Now and Then (TV series) =

ITV television sitcom 1983–84

- Genre: Sitcom
- Created by: John Esmonde; Bob Larbey
- Directed by: Derrick Goodwin
- Starring: Bernard Holley; Jill Kerman; Marc Gilbey; Polly Bell; John Alford; Sam Kelly; Marcia Warren
- Composer: Denis King
- Country of origin: United Kingdom
- Original language: English
- No. of series: 2
- No. of episodes: 13

Production
- Producers: Derrick Goodwin (Series 1); Humphrey Barclay (Series 2)
- Production locations: London, England, UK
- Running time: 30 minutes
- Production company: LWT

Original release
- Network: ITV
- Release: 24 July 1983 – 12 August 1984

Now and Then is a British World War II sitcom written by John Esmonde and Bob Larbey that aired on ITV in the early to mid 1980s. It ran for two series: the first series of seven episodes ran from 24 July to 4 September 1983, and the second and final series of six episodes ran from 8 July to 12 August 1984. The show was produced by LWT for the ITV network.

== Plot ==
An unusual Esmonde and Larbey sitcom, with drama roots, the premise of Now And Then was the planned sale of a South London house where a middle-aged husband and father of two, Peter Elston (Bernard Holley), had spent his entire life. The potential move awoke in him a scrapbook of memories, so part of each episode was spent in the past - during the Second World War, when Peter was seven/eight years old - and part in the present, where Peter's rebellious son Alan (Marc Gilbey) reminded him of how he used to be.

It was the war years - as seen through the eyes of a small boy (John Alford) - that shone through the mist, however. As Peter saw it, his father, Norman (Sam Kelly), was a great sage; Mum (Jill Kerman) was a heroine; Grandad (Arthur Lovegrove) (who had died by the second series) and Gran (Liz Smith) doted upon him; psychic Aunt Sadie (June Brown) and Uncle Gordon (Barry Stanton), who owned a surgical appliances shop, caused plenty of merriment; elder sister Sonia (Cindy O'Callaghan) married a GI named Nelson (Alan Polonsky) and fell pregnant; another sister, Mary (Tracy Hyde), joined the ATS and went about with a boyfriend named Randall (Ray Burdis); and brother Ted (Martin Gower) was away in the forces. For young Peter, wartime meant exciting uncertainty, blackouts, the Anderson Shelter, food shortages and a doodlebug bomb interrupting one of his piano lessons.

== Cast ==
- Bernard Holley as Older Peter Elston
- Jill Kerman as Jill Elston
- Marc Gilbey as Alan Elston
- Polly Bell as Amanda Elston
- John Alford as Young Peter Elston
- Sam Kelly as Norman Elston
- Marcia Warren as Bet Elston
- Liz Smith as Gran
- Arthur Lovegrove as Grandad (Series 1)
- Tracy Hyde as Mary Elston
- Cindy O'Callaghan as Sonia Elston
- Ray Burdis as Randall
- June Brown as Aunt Sadie
- Barry Stanton as Uncle Gordon
- Carol Harrison as Rene Manderville (Series 2)
- John White as Mr Pluckrose (Series 2)
- Alan Polonsky as Nelson (Series 2)

== Crew ==
- John Esmonde and Bob Larbey as Writers
- Derrick Goodwin as Director (Series 1–2)
- Derrick Goodwin as Producer (Series 1)
- Humphrey Barclay as Producer (Series 2)

== Episodes ==
=== Series overview ===
Series	Episodes	Originally released	
Series	Episodes	First released	Last released
1	7	24 July 1983	4 September 1983
2	6	8 July 1984	12 August 1984

A total of thirteen episodes were produced over two series.

=== Series 1 (1983) ===
Episodes aired on ITV on Sundays at 21:15.

No. overall	No. in series	Title	Original release date
1	1	"Episode 1"	24 July 1983
2	2	"Episode 2"	31 July 1983
3	3	"Episode 3"	7 August 1983
4	4	"Episode 4"	14 August 1983
5	5	"Episode 5"	21 August 1983
6	6	"Episode 6"	28 August 1983
7	7	"Episode 7"	4 September 1983

=== Series 2 (1984) ===
Episodes aired on ITV on Sundays at 21:30.

No. overall	No. in series	Title	Original release date
8	1	"Episode 1"	8 July 1984
9	2	"Episode 2"	15 July 1984
10	3	"Episode 3"	22 July 1984
11	4	"Episode 4"	29 July 1984
12	5	"Episode 5"	5 August 1984
13	6	"Episode 6"	12 August 1984

== Reception ==
This comedy drama from London Weekend Television looked at the lives of an ordinary English family over two generations. The main character, Peter Elston (Bernard Holley), was a 48-year-old man preparing to sell up and move from his South London home to the countryside in England.
