= Brush Strokes =

British television sitcom (1986–1991)

- Genre: Sitcom
- Created by: Esmonde and Larbey
- Directed by: Mandie Fletcher; John B. Hobbs; Harold Snoad
- Starring: Karl Howman; Gary Waldhorn; Mike Walling; Howard Lew Lewis; Jackie Lye
- Opening theme: "Because of You" by Dexys Midnight Runners
- Country of origin: United Kingdom
- Original language: English
- No. of series: 5
- No. of episodes: 40

Production
- Camera setup: Multiple camera
- Running time: 29 mins approx.

Original release
- Network: BBC1
- Release: 1 September 1986 – 7 April 1991

Brush Strokes is a British television sitcom broadcast on BBC1 from 1986 to 1991. Written by Esmonde and Larbey and set in South London, it depicted the (mostly) amorous adventures of a wisecracking house painter, Jacko (Karl Howman). There were 40 episodes spread over five series.

== Premise ==
Jacko (Karl Howman) works as a house painter alongside his brother-in-law, Eric (Mike Walling), who was married to Jacko's sister Jean (Nicky Croydon). He lives with his sister and brother-in-law. Jacko also shares an anti-authority humour. In this case the butt of his humour is his boss, Lionel Bainbridge.

Gary Waldhorn played Lionel, and Elizabeth Counsell played his wife, Veronica, who had a crush on Jacko. The Bainbridges had a daughter called Lesley who is a spoiled daddy's girl and became Jacko's girlfriend during series one. She was played by two actresses during the life of the show: Kim Thomson in the first series and Erika Hoffman from series two onwards. In series one it was hinted that Jacko was somehow indebted to Lionel and working for him after the pair had become involved with some unlawful money making wheeling-dealing some years prior, for which Jacko almost got caught and was set to stand trial until Lionel used his "respectable business reputation" to fabricate a story and get him acquitted, leaving Jacko "indebted" and working for him, against his better wishes, as a result. This history between the pair was several times hinted at during the first series but was never mentioned from series two onwards.

Jacko is a ladies' man. Much of the humour comes from his attempts at picking up women whilst around town on painting jobs – much to the disdain of his sister, his boss, and his boss's secretary.

Jackie Lye played Sandra, the secretary at work who became Jacko's fiancée in series two (they never actually married but still went on their honeymoon because they had paid for it). Other familiar faces that have appeared in episodes include Janine Duvitski, Tracie Bennett and Pippa Haywood.

The show is remembered by many for the slow-off-the-mark pub landlord, Elmo Putney (Howard Lew Lewis), who runs the pub where Jacko and friends take their lunch breaks. Elmo's catchphrase instead of swearing was "Chisel". In later episodes, Jacko unsuccessfully starts his own company, Splosh. Later Elmo leaves for Australia to set up another business in Alice Springs, which because of its name he thinks must be near a very large body of water. He becomes a rich man after his dog discovers opals in Australia, before returning to London, buying Jacko's failing company and turning it into a wine bar where everything is decorated in pink. Jacko returns to Bainbridge's, where Veronica is now in charge after Lionel's death. Veronica subsequently begins a new romance and remarries in the final series. The end of the series sees Jacko walking down the street and flipping a coin to decide who he should end up with, while Sandra and Lesley wait in the wine bar.

== Episodes ==
Series	Episodes	Originally released	
Series	Episodes	First released	Last released
1	13	1 September 1986	24 November 1986
2	7	12 October 1987	23 November 1987
3	6	28 November 1988	16 January 1989
4	6	22 February 1990	29 March 1990
5	8	17 February 1991	7 April 1991

=== Series 1 (1986) ===
No. overall	No. in series	Directed by	Written by	Original release date
1	1	Mandie Fletcher	John Esmonde, Bob Larbey	1 September 1986
2	2	Mandie Fletcher	John Esmonde, Bob Larbey	8 September 1986
3	3	Mandie Fletcher	John Esmonde, Bob Larbey	15 September 1986
4	4	Mandie Fletcher	John Esmonde, Bob Larbey	22 September 1986
5	5	Mandie Fletcher	John Esmonde, Bob Larbey	29 September 1986
6	6	Mandie Fletcher	John Esmonde, Bob Larbey	6 October 1986
7	7	Mandie Fletcher	John Esmonde, Bob Larbey	13 October 1986
8	8	Mandie Fletcher	John Esmonde, Bob Larbey	20 October 1986
9	9	Mandie Fletcher	John Esmonde, Bob Larbey	27 October 1986
10	10	Mandie Fletcher	John Esmonde, Bob Larbey	3 November 1986
11	11	Mandie Fletcher	John Esmonde, Bob Larbey	10 November 1986
12	12	Mandie Fletcher	John Esmonde, Bob Larbey	17 November 1986
13	13	Mandie Fletcher	John Esmonde, Bob Larbey	24 November 1986

=== Series 2 (1987) ===
No. overall	No. in series	Directed by	Written by	Original release date
14	1	Mandie Fletcher	John Esmonde, Bob Larbey	12 October 1987
15	2	Mandie Fletcher	John Esmonde, Bob Larbey	19 October 1987
16	3	Mandie Fletcher	John Esmonde, Bob Larbey	26 October 1987
17	4	Mandie Fletcher	John Esmonde, Bob Larbey	2 November 1987
18	5	Mandie Fletcher	John Esmonde, Bob Larbey	9 November 1987
19	6	Mandie Fletcher	John Esmonde, Bob Larbey	16 November 1987
20	7	Mandie Fletcher	John Esmonde, Bob Larbey	23 November 1987

=== Series 3 (1988–1989) ===
No. overall	No. in series	Directed by	Written by	Original release date
21	1	Harold Snoad	John Esmonde, Bob Larbey	28 November 1988
22	2	Harold Snoad	John Esmonde, Bob Larbey	5 December 1988
23	3	Harold Snoad	John Esmonde, Bob Larbey	12 December 1988
24	4	Harold Snoad	John Esmonde, Bob Larbey	19 December 1988
25	5	Harold Snoad	John Esmonde, Bob Larbey	9 January 1989
26	6	Harold Snoad	John Esmonde, Bob Larbey	16 January 1989

=== Series 4 (1990) ===
No. overall	No. in series	Directed by	Written by	Original release date
27	1	John B. Hobbs	John Esmonde, Bob Larbey	22 February 1990
28	2	John B. Hobbs	John Esmonde, Bob Larbey	1 March 1990
29	3	John B. Hobbs	John Esmonde, Bob Larbey	8 March 1990
30	4	John B. Hobbs	John Esmonde, Bob Larbey	15 March 1990
31	5	John B. Hobbs	John Esmonde, Bob Larbey	22 March 1990
32	6	John B. Hobbs	John Esmonde, Bob Larbey	29 March 1990

=== Series 5 (1991) ===
No. overall	No. in series	Directed by	Written by	Original release date
33	1	John B. Hobbs	John Esmonde, Bob Larbey	17 February 1991
34	2	John B. Hobbs	John Esmonde, Bob Larbey	24 February 1991
35	3	John B. Hobbs	John Esmonde, Bob Larbey	3 March 1991
36	4	John B. Hobbs	John Esmonde, Bob Larbey	10 March 1991
37	5	John B. Hobbs	John Esmonde, Bob Larbey	17 March 1991
38	6	John B. Hobbs	John Esmonde, Bob Larbey	24 March 1991
39	7	John B. Hobbs	John Esmonde, Bob Larbey	31 March 1991
40	8	John B. Hobbs	John Esmonde, Bob Larbey	7 April 1991

== Music ==
The theme song "Because of You" was written and performed by Dexys Midnight Runners. Released as a single in November 1986, it reached number 13 in the UK Singles Chart.

== Other media ==
Jacko and Elmo also appeared in the 1989 Comic Relief show on BBC1 as a pair of murderous psychopaths.

Brush Strokes is also repeatedly referred to as a running joke in Diane Morgan’s 2018 show Cunk On Britain.

== DVD releases ==
Brush Strokes was originally released on VHS and DVD via Universal Playback, a subsidiary of Universal Pictures Home Entertainment, in August 2004. The sets were listed as the first and second series, when in fact, it consisted only of the complete first series of thirteen episodes. This became a common occurrence with Universal Playback as the same issues are present with their other titles, such as Last of the Summer Wine. Acorn Media acquired the distribution rights to the series thereafter, releasing in exactly the same format, mistakenly resulting in a complete series of six series instead of the proper five.

DVD title	Actual series	Release date		BBFC rating
DVD title	Actual series	Region 2	Region 4	BBFC rating
Series 1 & 2	One	30 August 2004	No release	PG
Series One	One (ep 1–7)	No release	18 March 2009	—N/a
Series Two	One (ep 8–13)	No release	24 June 2009	—N/a
The Complete Series One and Two	One	5 September 2011	3 July 2013	PG
The Complete Series Three and Four	Two and Three	16 April 2012	24 October 2012	PG
The Complete Series Five and Six	Four and Five	19 August 2013	20 March 2013	PG
Complete Series One to Six	One to Five	7 October 2013	No release	PG
