= The Other One (1977 TV series) =

- Genre: Sitcom
- Created by: John Esmonde and Bob Larbey
- Directed by: Gareth Gwenlan; John Howard Davies
- Starring: Richard Briers; Michael Gambon
- Music by: Ronnie Hazelhurst
- Country of origin: United Kingdom
- Original language: English
- No. of series: 2
- No. of episodes: 13

Production
- Producers: John Howard Davies (Series 1); Roger Race (Series 2)
- Running time: 30 minutes
- Production company: BBC

Original release
- Network: BBC 1
- Release: 11 November 1977 – 30 March 1979

The Other One is a British sitcom, produced by BBC Television. It ran from 1977 to 1979 - a total of 13 episodes were produced over two series - and was written by Bob Larbey and John Esmonde. The series was a follow up vehicle for Richard Briers who recently had success in the sitcom The Good Life (1975–1978). The premise for the series initially focussed on two passengers Ralph Tanner (Briers) and Brian Bryant (Michael Gambon) who meet at Gatwick Airport, en-route on holiday to Spain. They soon find themselves on the same flight and eventually the same hotel. Although they come from different walks of life, they soon bond and form a close friendship, as they embark on a series of misadventures.

== Premise ==
The idea for the show came from creating a dynamic similar to The Odd Couple, where two 'misfits' with different personalities, who are diametrically opposite in character, are drawn together in friendship. Brian is an introverted bore who is gullible and timid, whilst Ralph is an extroverted, outgoing and lively party animal, who also happens to be a compulsive liar. When interviewed about the series in an article by Mary Malcom at the time of show's release, Larbey noted that Brian has led a boring existence and sees Ralph as the fuse which makes his life more exciting, whilst Ralph sees Brian as someone who is naive and trustful enough not to see through him. However it turns out that Ralph is rather incompetent and quite ill-equipped for everyday life, yet he always seems to impress Brian, who fails to see Ralph's failings. The first series see the pair experiencing a series of misadventures during their holiday in Spain, whilst the second series charts their return to the UK, where they go into business together as travelling salesmen.

== Cast ==
- Richard Briers – Ralph Tanner
- Michael Gambon – Brian Bryant
- Hilary Mason – Mrs. Flensing
- Jill Kerman – Sue Bainbridge (Series 1)
- Michael Chesden – Manolo (Series 1)
- Martin Read – Fred (Series 1)
- Gretchen Franklin – Mrs. Tanner (Series 2)

== Episodes ==
=== Series 1 (1977) ===
No. overall	No. in series	Title	Original release date
1	1	"Episode One"	11 November 1977
2	2	"Episode Two"	18 November 1977
3	3	"Episode Three"	25 November 1977
4	4	"Episode Four"	2 December 1977
5	5	"Episode Five"	9 December 1977
6	6	"Episode Six"	16 December 1977
7	7	"Episode Seven"	30 December 1977

=== Series 2 (1979) ===
No. overall	No. in series	Title	Original release date
8	1	"Episode One"	23 February 1979
9	2	"Episode Two"	2 March 1979
10	3	"Episode Three"	9 March 1979
11	4	"Episode Four"	16 March 1979
12	5	"Episode Five"	23 March 1979
13	6	"Episode Six"	30 March 1979

== Reception ==
The series had a mixed reception. Jennifer Lovelace from The Stage described the humour in the first episode as desultory and lacking in laughs. Patrick Campbell from the same publication thought that Briers looked lost in his role and was prone to caricature, while Gambon seemed to have been created for one episode then left to his own devices. Bill Harris, writing for the Aberdeen Evening Express, described the interchange between Briers and Gambon as a slick routine of interchangeable comic and straight man roles that may not appeal to some. Although the first series was met with indifference, Bill Cotton, controller of BBC1 at the time, decided to give it another chance and commissioned another series consisting of six episodes. A third series was not commissioned and the show was cancelled after the final episode aired in March 1979.

== Home media ==
The series has seldom been repeated on television since it first aired, apart from a few repeats on UK Gold. A boxset of the complete Series 1 was released by the BBC on 27 August 2007, but due to low sales, Series 2 has not been released on DVD.
