= Hope It Rains =

ITV television sitcom 1991–92

- Genre: Sitcom
- Created by: John Esmonde; Bob Larbey
- Directed by: John Howard Davies
- Starring: Tom Bell; Holly Aird; Eamon Boland; Jenny Lee; Miles Richardson
- Composer: Graham de Wilde
- Country of origin: United Kingdom
- Original language: English
- No. of series: 2
- No. of episodes: 13

Production
- Producer: John Howard Davies
- Production locations: Bognor Regis, West Sussex, England, UK
- Running time: 30 minutes
- Production company: Thames Television

Original release
- Network: ITV
- Release: 3 June 1991 – 29 July 1992

Hope It Rains is a British sitcom written by John Esmonde and Bob Larbey that aired on ITV in the early 1990s. It ran for two series: the first series of seven episodes ran from 3 June to 15 July 1991, and the second and final series of six episodes ran from 24 June to 29 July 1992. The show was produced by Thames Television for the ITV network.

== Plot ==
The programme stars Harry Nash (Tom Bell) is the proprietor of a waxworks in a rundown seaside resort. He has to struggle to make ends meet, but he manages to get by somehow. Suddenly, Harry finds himself having to cope with his god-daughter Jace Elliott (Holly Aird), who comes to stay with him after the death of her parents. Harry is a morose, self-contained individual, while Jace is a hard-bitten, abrasive young lady from a tough neighbourhood. The two take an instant dislike to one another, but have to find ways to coexist.

== Cast ==
=== Regulars ===
- Tom Bell as Harry Nash
- Holly Aird as Jace Elliott
- Eamon Boland as Dennis Portland

=== Guests ===
- Jenny Lee as Sybil
- Miles Richardson as Nigel

== Crew ==
- John Esmonde and Bob Larbey as Writers
- John Howard Davies as Director
- John Howard Davies as Producer

== Episodes ==
=== Series overview ===
Series	Episodes	Originally released	
Series	Episodes	First released	Last released
1	7	3 June 1991	15 July 1991
2	6	24 June 1992	29 July 1992

A total of thirteen episodes were produced over two series.

=== Series 1 (1991) ===
No. overall	No. in series	Title	Original release date
1	1	"Relations"	3 June 1991
2	2	"The Lodger"	10 June 1991
3	3	"Cover Girl"	17 June 1991
4	4	"Illness"	24 June 1991
5	5	"Cleaning Up"	1 July 1991
6	6	"The King"	8 July 1991
7	7	"Fire Hazard"	15 July 1991

=== Series 2 (1992) ===
No. overall	No. in series	Title	Original release date
8	1	"No News"	24 June 1992
9	2	"The Summer Show"	1 July 1992
10	3	"Seaside Photos"	8 July 1992
11	4	"Music"	15 July 1992
12	5	"Television"	22 July 1992
13	6	"Old Actors"	29 July 1992

== Locations ==
Much of the show was filmed in and around the seaside town of Bognor Regis in West Sussex, England.
