= Mulberry (TV series) =

BBC1 fantasy sitcom 1992–93

- Genre: Fantasy sitcom
- Created by: John Esmonde; Bob Larbey
- Starring: Karl Howman; Geraldine McEwan; Tony Selby; Lill Roughley; Mary Healey; John Bennett; Derek Benfield
- Country of origin: United Kingdom
- Original language: English
- No. of series: 2
- No. of episodes: 13

Production
- Running time: 30 minutes

Original release
- Network: BBC 1
- Release: 24 February 1992 – 25 May 1993

Mulberry is a fantasy sitcom written by John Esmonde and Bob Larbey that aired on BBC 1 in the early 1990s. It ran for two series: the first series of six episodes ran from 24 February to 30 March 1992, and the second series of seven episodes ran from 8 April to 25 May 1993. A third series was planned which would have concluded the story and wrap up the plotlines established in the first two series, but was cancelled before production began. As a result, the story never reached a conclusion.

== Plot ==
The programme stars Karl Howman as the mysterious Mulberry, a man who appears at the household of a cantankerous spinster, Rose Farnaby, and applies for a position as her manservant. Miss Farnaby's other staff, Bert and Alice Finch, are immediately suspicious, as the position for which Mulberry applies had not yet been advertised.

Their suspicions are well placed. Mulberry is not all he seems; in fact, he is an apprentice Grim Reaper who has been dispatched to the house to escort Miss Farnaby to the next world. Surprisingly for a Grim Reaper, Mulberry has a sentimental, even comical, side with a love of life and laughter that moves him to dedicate himself to ensuring that the sullen Miss Farnaby's last days on Earth are happy, using his role as servant to put his plans into motion.

Mulberry's sensitivity and interest in Miss Farnaby's well-being do not sit well with Mulberry's father, a fully fledged Grim Reaper with no interest in human emotions. He appears in most episodes as a mysterious figure (billed as "The Stranger") in a black hat and dark clothes, urging Mulberry to get on with the job. This is Mulberry's first assignment as a Grim Reaper, a task which he was told he could ease into. His father is annoyed with his dawdling. Mulberry refuses at first to do the job, putting it off constantly much to his father's annoyance, and eventually, we learn the source of Mulberry's love of life: his mother, is actually Springtime. Mulberry's mother is one of the few things able to move his father as he grudgingly lets Miss Farnaby have three extra months of life and allows Mulberry to stay for that time after his mother visits. Mulberry also meets his mother for the first time who says she "does have some influence" on his father.

The device of Mulberry's father being Death and mother being Springtime is loosely borrowed from Greek mythology. Hades, lord of the underworld married a young maiden goddess named Persephone. Demeter was her mother and was heartbroken at the fate of Persephone having to live forever in hell. As the goddess of fertility and agriculture, her grief caused winter to come. As a compromise it was arranged for Persephone to only spend half the year with her husband. Thus we have winter and summer annually. Since springtime comes when Persephone returns to the surface she has become a symbol of youth, rebirth and spring. However, in Greek mythology, Hades and Persephone never have any children.

Ambiguous references are made to where Mulberry and his father 'come from', and what kind of beings they actually are, but these issues are not resolved in the show due to the cancellation of the series.

== Cast ==
=== Regulars ===
- Karl Howman – Mulberry
- Geraldine McEwan – Miss Rose Farnaby
- Tony Selby – Albert ("Bert") Finch
- Lill Roughley (Series 1) / Mary Healey (Series 2) – Alice Finch
- John Bennett – The Stranger

=== Guests ===
- Caroline Blakiston – Adele
- Sylvia Syms – Springtime
- Derek Benfield – Alf

== Crew ==
- John Esmonde and Bob Larbey – Writers
- John B. Hobbs / Clive Grainger – Director
- John B. Hobbs – Producer

== Episodes ==
A total of thirteen episodes were produced over two series.

=== Series 1 (1992) ===
No. overall	No. in series	Title	Original release date
1	1	"Arrival"	24 February 1992
2	2	"Fireworks"	2 March 1992
3	3	"The Quiz"	9 March 1992
4	4	"The Holiday"	16 March 1992
5	5	"The Dinner Party"	23 March 1992
6	6	"Leaving"	30 March 1992

=== Series 2 (1993) ===
No. overall	No. in series	Title	Original release date
7	1	"Springtime"	8 April 1993
8	2	"The Accident"	15 April 1993
9	3	"The Matchmaker"	22 April 1993
10	4	"The Art Class"	29 April 1993
11	5	"A Mysterious Guest"	6 May 1993
12	6	"A Musical Evening"	13 May 1993
13	7	"An Unexpected Visit"	20 May 1993

== Locations ==
Much of the show was filmed around Dorset.

- Exterior shots for the Farnaby estate were filmed at High Hall, a 17th-century manor-house near Wimborne.
- Witchampton was used for exterior shots of the local village.
- Agglestone Rock, Swanage in used in a couple of episodes.
- Wareham

Additional locations include a former Little Chef (now a Travelodge) in Saint Leonards in Hampshire, and the Westbourne Shopping Arcade in Bournemouth.
