= Peter Brachacki =

Kazimierz Piotr "Peter" Brachacki (1926 in Dębieńsko, Poland – 1980) was a production designer who worked for BBC Television in the 1960s. Although he worked on several programmes, he is best remembered as the first production designer for Doctor Who in 1963, making him responsible for the iconic design of the TARDIS interior.

== Doctor Who ==
The Peter Brachacki-designed TARDIS interior

Brachacki was production designer for the very first episode of Doctor Who, An Unearthly Child, shot and broadcast in 1963. Despite the success of his design for the TARDIS interior set, he was not enthusiastic about working on the programme and did so under duress. He worked only on the very first episode and its re-mount, thereafter being replaced on the opening serial by Barry Newbery and never working on the series again. Director Waris Hussein recalled in later interviews that he was never happy with Brachacki's contribution and only kept him on as designer out of necessity, as there was not the time to request a replacement. Original Doctor Who producer Verity Lambert was impressed with Brachacki's work on the TARDIS interior even though she personally did not like him.

Brachacki’s concept for the TARDIS interior included:

- the sterile, white timeless look
- the scattering about of random furniture and objects from different periods
- the central hexagonal console, designed so that all controls should be equally accessible to a single pilot
- the moving time column, intended to give an at-a-glance indication of the ship's status and whereabouts
- the roundels set into the wall, intended to pulsate when the ship was in motion. (This and other initial concepts were never realised due to budgetary restraints.) Hussein later noted that the roundel pattern arose simply from the fact that the plastic with which Brachacki had made his initial concept model featured round patterning.

The TARDIS interior saw occasional redesigns over the following twenty-six years, but always in line with the original concept. The console room was completely redesigned for the show's fourteenth season, but still the concept was retained of the single central console and the roundels on the wall. This became the default TARDIS design: hence the same concept applied for the brief glimpse of the interior of the Rani's TARDIS in the episode season twenty-two serial The Mark of the Rani. Similarly the Meddling Monk's TARDIS, and the Master's TARDIS during the Pertwee era, always followed roughly the same design as the Doctor's TARDIS, mostly because these last were obviously the same sets as were used for the Doctor's TARDIS, slightly redressed.

The TARDIS interior was completely redesigned again for the 1996 Doctor Who TV movie, and the new series that began broadcasting in 2005. Even then the central console was retained, and the new television series includes the geometric patterns on the walls.

In 2013 the BBC produced a docudrama called An Adventure in Space and Time, depicting the creation and early days of Doctor Who, as part of the programme's fiftieth anniversary celebrations. Brachacki appears as a character in the drama, played by actor David Annen.

== Other TV work ==
Brachacki also worked as production designer on:

- Blake's 7 (1978)
- When the Boat Comes In (1976)
- Fall of Eagles (1974)
- Play for Today - All Good Men (1974)
- The Witch's Daughter (1971)
- The Silver Sword (1971)
- Paul Temple (1969) TV Series
- The Liver Birds (1969) TV Series
