= Holly Aird =

English actress (born 1969)

- Born: Imogen Holly Aird; 18 May 1969 (age 57); Aldershot, Hampshire, England
- Occupation: Actress
- Years active: 1980–present
- Spouses: James Purefoy (m. 1996; div. 2002) Toby Merritt (m. 2004)
- Children: 2

Imogen Holly Aird (born 18 May 1969) is an English television actress. She was born in Aldershot, Hampshire.

== Career ==
Aird was spotted by a casting director at age nine whilst at Bush Davies Ballet School and starred in the 1980 dramatisation of the H. G. Wells novel The History of Mr Polly. In 1981, she portrayed the young Elspeth Huxley in the television adaptation of the latter's autobiographical book The Flame Trees of Thika. In 1982, she starred as the young Beatrix Potter in The Tale of Beatrix Potter. She was seen in The Happy Valley in 1987 with Denholm Elliott, a true story in which she played Juanita Carberry, a 1930s schoolgirl in Kenya who is often severely caned by her governess. She starred in the channel 4 sitcom Dressing for Breakfast in 1995. As well as small parts in various television series, Aird became known for playing Nancy Thorpe/Garvey in Soldier Soldier. She starred in the 1997 film Fever Pitch alongside Colin Firth, and in 2000 as forensic pathologist Frankie Wharton in Waking the Dead. Aird has done voiceover for various BBC natural history projects (including Wild Mallorca) as well as various TV advertisements. In 2007, she played a clinical psychologist in Channel 4's drama 'Secret Life' and in 2009 took a leading role in Talkback Thames's Monday Monday.

== Family ==
Aird has one son with her ex-husband James Purefoy, and one daughter with husband Toby Merritt.

== Filmography ==
=== Film ===
Year	Title	Role	Notes
1992	Carry On Columbus	Maria	
1996	Intimate Relations	Deirdre	
1997	Fever Pitch	Jo	
1998	The Theory of Flight	Julie	
1999	Dreaming of Joseph Lees	Maria	
1999	The Criminal	Det. Sgt. Rebecca White	
2002	Possession	Ellen Ash	
2006	Scenes of a Sexual Nature	Molly	
2021	Silent Night	Susie	
2022	Fly Free	Fiona	Short film

=== Television ===
Year	Title	Role	Notes
1980	The History of Mr. Polly	Miss Polly	2 episodes
1981	The Flame Trees of Thika	Elspeth Grant	7 episodes
1982	Secrets	Wendy Ansell	TV film
1982	Spider's Web	Pippa Hailsham-Brown	TV film
1983	The Tale of Beatrix Potter	Beatrix Potter (young)	TV film
1984	Oxbridge Blues	Lucy	Episode: "The Muse"
1985	Affairs of the Heart	Rosemary Bonamy	6 episodes
1986	Seal Morning	Rowena Farre	6 episodes
1986	Sunday Premiere	Juanita Carberry	Episode: "The Happy Valley"
1988	Inspector Morse	Angie Hartman	Episode: "Last Bus to Woodstock"
1988	Double First	Ellen Hobson	7 episodes
1989	Mother Love	Emily	4 episodes
1990	Chain	Vicky Elliott	Episode: "Vicky Elliott"
1990	Sea Dragon	Ffion	Episodes: "The Pursuit", "The Blood Feud"
1991	Miss Marple	Gina Hudd	Episode: "They Do It With Mirrors"
1991–1992	Hope It Rains	Jace Elliott	13 episodes
1991–1995	Soldier Soldier	Sgt. Nancy Thorpe	Regular role (series 1–3, 5)
1993	15: The Life and Death of Philip Knight	Karen Painter	TV film
1995	Kavanagh QC	Judy Simmons	Episode: "A Family Affair"
1995	Circles of Deceit: Dark Secret	Sarah Ellis	TV film
1995–1998	Dressing for Breakfast	Carla	21 episodes
1997	Have Your Cake and Eat It	Allie Gray	4 episodes
1997	Rules of Engagement	Dawn Boll	TV film
2000–2005	Waking the Dead	Frankie Wharton	Main role (series 1–4)
2006	Losing It	Nancy McNaughton	TV film
2006, 2021	Casualty	Laura Merriman	5 episodes
2007	Secret Life	Emma	TV film
2007	Torn	Sarah Hooper / Alice Hooper	3 episodes
2009	Law & Order: UK	Julia Mortimer	Episode: "Buried"
2009	Monday Monday	Alyson Cartmell	7 episodes
2010	Material Girl	Caroline	Episode #1.2
2010	Identity	Tessa Stein	6 episodes
2011	The Promise	Chris Matthews	4 episodes
2011	Midsomer Murders	Claire Powell	Episode: "The Oblong Murders"
2011	The Restaurant Inspector	Narrator (voice)	2 episodes
2011	Page Eight	Anna Hervé	TV film
2017	Unforgotten	Elise Dunphy	3 episodes
2017	Grantchester	Alice Dunn	Episode #3.3
2021	A Discovery of Witches	Francoise	6 episodes
2022	Four Lives	Jeanette Taylor	2 episodes
2022	McDonald & Dodds	Paula Monksford	Episode: "Belvedere"
2022	Midsomer Murders	Paige Burrows	Episode: "The Blacktrees Prophecy"
2023	Hijack	Amanda	7 episodes
