= Eamon Boland =

English actor (born 1947)

- Born: Eamon Denis Boland; 15 July 1947 (age 79); Manchester, Lancashire, England, UK
- Occupation: Actor

Eamon Denis Boland (born 15 July 1947) is an English actor.

He has played Tony Walker in Casualty, Frank O'Connor in Coronation Street, Gerry Hollis in Kinsey, Jim Gray in The Chief, Phil Fox in Fox and Clive in Singles. Boland has also appeared in The Gentle Touch, The Bill, Lady Killers, Stay Lucky, Soldier Soldier, The Grand, Peak Practice, Brookside, Doctors, Early Doors, Heartbeat, Spearhead, Inspector George Gently and Holby City. He played George Sugden in Heartbeat series 11 episode 18. In the TV series Liverpool One, which ran for two seasons, Boland appeared as Chief Inspector Graham Hill, head of division. He also had a regular role as Dennis, a seaside photographer, in the Thames Television sitcom Hope It Rains, which ran from 1991 to 1992.
