= Go Back for Murder =

1960 play

- Original language: English
- Written by: Agatha Christie
- Genre: Mystery
- Setting: Alderbury, a house in the West of England

Premiere
- Date: 22 February 1960
- Place: King's Theatre, Edinburgh

Go Back for Murder is a 1960 mystery play by the British writer Agatha Christie. It is an adaptation of her 1942 novel Five Little Pigs, with the principal character of the book Hercule Poirot removed from the story. Much of the detective work is taken over by Carla Crale, daughter of the murder victim, with the assistance of Justin Fogg, a lawyer.

It premiered at the King's Theatre in Edinburgh. It then transferred to the Duchess Theatre in London's West End where it ran for 37 performances. It received a poor reception from critics. The London cast included Robert Urquhart, Lisa Daniely, Ann Firbank, Margot Boyd, Mark Eden, Dorothy Bromiley and Nigel Green. It was directed by Hubert Gregg.

== Bibliography ==
- Kabatchnik, Amnon. Blood on the Stage, 1950-1975: Milestone Plays of Crime, Mystery, and Detection. Scarecrow Press, 2011.
- Lachman, Marvin. The Villainous Stage: Crime Plays on Broadway and in the West End. McFarland, 2014.
