= Karl Howman =

British actor (born 1953)

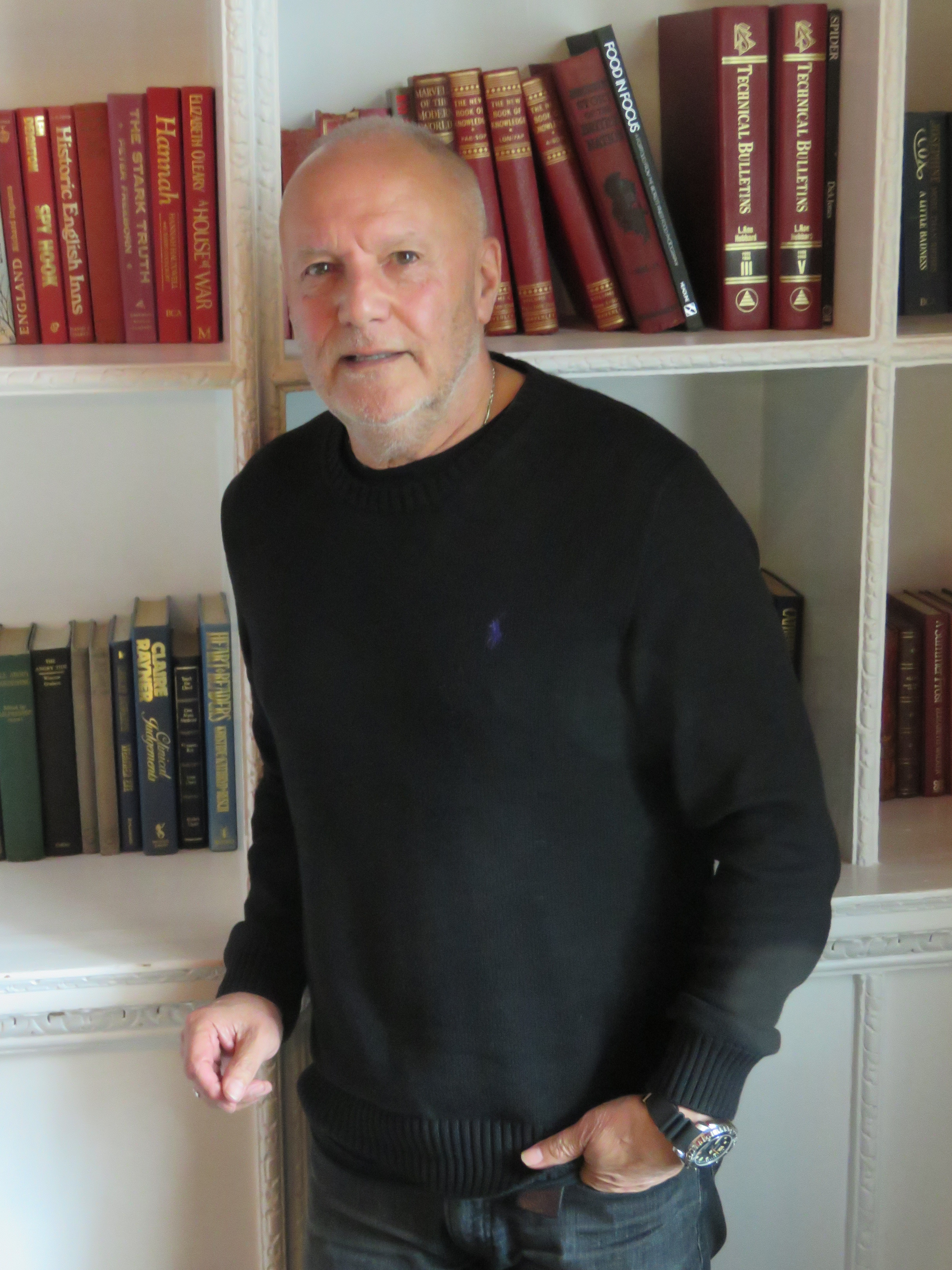
- Born: 13 December 1953 (age 72); Woolwich, London, England
- Occupations: Writer, actor, director
- Years active: 1972–present
- Spouse: Clare Lightfoot (m. 1976)
- Children: 2, including Chloe

Karl Howman (born 13 December 1953) is an English writer, actor and director.

Howman has been an actor since 1968, where he started with the National Youth Theatre. Howman is best known for playing Jacko in the sitcom Brush Strokes from 1986 to 1991, Mulberry in Mulberry from 1992 to 1993 and Buster Briggs in EastEnders from 2014 to 2016.

== Acting career ==
Howman appeared in many TV shows and films throughout his career. He is an established British comedy actor.

Howman took over the role of Jakey Smith from Robert Lindsay in Get Some In! in its final series in 1978. He then appeared in the episode "Shadow" in the BBC series Blake's 7, in the Minder episode "All About Scoring, Innit?" playing Danny Varrow, and in The Sweeney episode "May," playing Davey Holmes.

In 1980, he appeared in Babylon, a 1980 British drama film directed by Franco Rosso. Written by Franco Rosso and Martin Stellman, it is an incendiary portrait of racial tension and police brutality set in Brixton, London.

On 25 September 2014, it was announced that Howman had been cast in long-running BBC soap EastEnders. Howman appeared as the character Buster Briggs. In his time on the show, Buster's storylines included his relationship with Shirley Carter (Linda Henry), his relationship with his two sons Mick Carter (Danny Dyer) and Dean Wicks (Matt Di Angelo), running a fish stall and having an affair with Kathy Sullivan (Gillian Taylforth). In July 2016, it was announced that Howman would be leaving the show after nearly two years. Buster left the show after his relationship with Shirley and his affair with Kathy both ended, with Howman's last episode airing on 23 September 2016.

On the radio he also appeared in King Street Junior as Mr Philip Sims and in Coming Alive as Terry King.

== Writing projects ==
In recent years, Howman has begun developing work as a writer. His first book, Secret Spitfires, co-written with Ethem Cetintas and Gavin Clarke, went to paperback from hardback in 2022; he also co-directed and produced the film of the same name. Howman's second book, A Million Ways to stay on the Run (ISBN 978-1-915306-26-5) which he co-wrote with Donal Macintyre, was a Sunday Times bestseller two weeks after publication in early 2023. The audio book, which is narrated by Howman, won the Best Audio Book 2024 at True Crime Awards.

== Personal life ==
Howman married Clare Lightfoot in 1976. They have two children, actresses Chloe Howman and Katy-Jo Howman, and six grandchildren.

Howman supports Charlton Athletic.

== Filmography ==
=== Film ===
Year	Title	Role	Notes
1972	The Canterbury Tales	Lover	uncredited
1973	That'll Be the Day	Johnny	
1974	Stardust	Stevie	
1976	Exposé	Big Youth	
1979	Porridge	Urquart	
1980	Babylon	Ronnie	
1980	The Long Good Friday	David	
1983	Party Party	Johnny Reeves	
2000	Malicious Intent	Dirk Saunders	
2005	The Truth About Love	Cliff Sharpe	

=== Television ===
Year	Title	Role	Notes
1972	Softly, Softly: Task Force	Fletcher	Episode: "Justice"
1972	Thirty-Minute Theatre	Bennett	Episode: "You've Been a Long Time, Alfred"
1973	The Jensen Code	Jacko	7 episodes
1973	Warship	AB Mick Turner	Episode: "The Prize"
1973	Armchair Theatre	Spice	Episode: "The Death of Glory"
1974	Marked Personal	Gordon Smales	2 episodes
1974	Man About the House	Philip	Episode: "Two Foot Two, Eyes of Blue"
1974	The Fortunes of Nigel	Jenkin Vincent	All 5 episodes
1975	The Prodigal Daughter	Patrick O'Donnell	TV film
1975	Public Eye	Bricky	Episode: "They All Sound Simple at First"
1975	Angels	Barney	Episode: "Off Duty"
1975	Shades of Greene	Second Boy	Episode: "Two Gentle People"
1976	The Sweeney	Davey Holmes	Episode: "May"
1977	Van der Valk	Eric	Episode: "The Professor"
1978	Hazell	Slippery	Episode: "Hazell Pays a Debt"
1978	Life at Stake	Hostage	Episode: "The Train That Never Arrived"
1978	Get Some In!	Jakey Smith	7 episodes
1978	Angels	Terry Jordan	Episode: "The Visitor"
1978	People Like Us	Boxer Carver	6 episodes
1978	Il y a encore des noisetiers	Bob Perret-Latour	TV film
1978-1981	Play for Today	Policeman/Geoffrey	2 episodes, including The Flipside of Dominick Hide
1979	Blake's 7	Bek	Episode: "Shadow"
1979	S.O.S. Titanic	Harold Lowe	TV film
1980	Fox	Griff	4 episodes
1980	The Other 'Arf	Alex	2 episodes
1980-1985	Minder	Danny Varrow/Browning	2 episodes, including "Minder on the Orient Express"
1981	Keep It in the Family	Arnold	Episode: "Splitting Headaches"
1981	Only When I Laugh	Ronnie	Episode: "Accident"
1982	The Professionals	Stacey	Episode: "Foxhole on the Roof"
1982	Shelley	Messenger	Episode: "Shelley Versus Shelley"
1983–1984	A Fine Romance	Terry Bullivant	4 episodes
1985	Oscar	Fred Atkins	All 3 episodes
1985	Juliet Bravo	Billy Griffiths	Episode: "The Cut"
1985	Dempsey and Makepeace	Photographer	Episode: "Set a Thief"
1985	Black Silk	Det. Sgt. Hogg	Episode: "The Cause of Liberty"
1985	Ties of Blood	Bob Wynne	Episode: "The Military Wing"
1986–1991	Brush Strokes	Jacko	All 40 episodes
1986	Slinger's Day	Scruff	Episode: "New Management"
1988	Boon	Lenny Bright	Episode: "Peacemaker"
1989	Saracen	Jamie	Episode: "Robbers"
1992–1993	Mulberry	Mulberry	All 13 episodes
1995–1996	Bad Boys	Wayne Todd	All 7 episodes
1998–1999	Babes in the Wood	Charlie Lovall	All 14 episodes
2001	The Bill	Julian Napper	4 episodes
2001-2014	Doctors	Terry Murray/Ray Evendon	2 episodes
2002	Holby City	Ian Brooks	Episode: "The Private Sector"
2004	The Last Detective	Keith Telfer	Episode: "Christine"
2005	Mile High	Warren	Episode: #2.19
2009	Casualty	Rod	Episode: "Ask Me No Questions"
2014–2016	EastEnders	Buster Briggs	143 episodes
2020	Barmy Dale	DS Linklater	Episode: "Dreaming of a Quiet Christmas"
