= Oscar (1985 serial) =

- Genre: Biographical drama
- Written by: John Hawkesworth
- Directed by: Henry Herbert
- Starring: Michael Gambon; Robin Lermitte; Tim Hardy; Karl Howman; John Hudson; Bryan Murray
- Original language: English
- No. of series: 1
- No. of episodes: 3

Production
- Executive producer: John Hawkesworth
- Producer: Carol Robertson
- Editor: Phil Southby

Original release
- Release: 26 March – 28 March 1985

Oscar is a British TV serial first transmitted by BBC2 in March 1985. All three episodes were directed by Henry Herbert, 17th Earl of Pembroke. Michael Gambon portrayed Oscar Wilde while other actors included Robin Lermitte as Lord Alfred Douglas, Tim Hardy as Alfred Taylor, Emily Richard as Constance Wilde and Norman Rodway as the Marquis of Queensberry. The serial concentrated on Wilde's trials and time in prison.
