= Never Come Back =

- Genre: Crime drama
- Created by: David Pirie
- Based on: Never Come Back by John Mair
- Starring: Nathaniel Parker; James Fox; Jonathan Coy; Suzanna Hamilton; Martin Clunes
- Composer: Stanley Myers
- Country of origin: United Kingdom
- Original language: English
- No. of episodes: 3

Production
- Producer: Joe Waters
- Running time: 3 x 50 minutes

Original release
- Network: BBC Two
- Release: 21 March – 4 April 1990
- Network: BBC One
- Release: 17 December 1990

Never Come Back is a three-part television crime drama created by David Pirie, directed by Ben Bolt, and produced by the BBC. Three episodes were made and were first broadcast on BBC Two in 1990, on 21 March, 28 March, and 4 April. An edited 2 x 75 minute episode version was broadcast on BBC One later that year, on 17 December.

== Plot ==
In September 1939, Desmond Thane is attracted to Anna Raven, a beautiful young woman, but soon finds himself involved in a murder mystery.

== Cast ==
- Nathaniel Parker as Desmond Thane
- James Fox as Foster
- Jonathan Coy as Marcus
- Jo Ross as Woman Neighbour
- Suzanna Hamilton as Anna Raven
- Ingrid Lacey as Sarah
- Paul Casselle as PC at Hospital
- Robin Miller as Party Guest
- Martin Clunes as Luke
- Timothy Bateson as Poole
- Louise Ashbourne as Sally
- David Becalick as Wellman
- Serena Evans as Annabelle
- Brian Capron as Plain Clothes PC
- John Woodnutt as Sir John
- Mary Wimbush as Aunt Olivia
- Gareth Forwood as Male Neighbour
- Nigel Pegram as Dr Carver
- Larry Dann as Frederick
- Ken Sharrock as Uninformed PC
- Charles Pemberton as Police Sergeant
- Anthony Dawes as Embury
- Stella Tanner as Brothel madame
- Alec Linstead as Menswear President
- Christopher Saul as Detective
- John Baker as John Lilley
- Peter Robert Scott as Army officer
- Jamie Ripman as Army officer
- Colin Dunn as Lang
- Kenneth Midwood as Party Guest
- Tony Collins as ARP Warden
- Richard Jamieson as Film studio man

== Production ==
=== Writing ===
Never Come Back was written by David Pirie and based on the novel by John Mair. The novel had previously inspired the storyline of Tiger by the Tail (1955), scripted by John Gilling and Willis Goldbeck.

=== Filming ===
The series was filmed in the Severn Gorge and Bridgnorth, in Shropshire, England, UK.

== Home media release ==
Although the series was never released on commercial home video in the UK, a two-part compilation version - running to 83 & 63 minutes - appeared on Vol 2 No's 7 and 8 of BBC Video World, a fortnightly subscription-only service, primarily for expatriates, in April 1990.

The series was released on DVD in the United States in 2000.
