= Wokenwell =

British television crime drama series

- Genre: Crime drama
- Created by: Bill Gallagher
- Starring: Ian McElhinney; Celia Imrie; Nicholas Gleaves; Lesley Dunlop; Jason Done; Nicola Stephenson; Bryan Pringle
- Theme music composer: Ilona Sekacz
- Country of origin: United Kingdom
- Original language: English
- No. of series: 1
- No. of episodes: 6

Production
- Executive producer: Sally Head
- Producer: Paul Marcus
- Production locations: Marsden, West Yorkshire, England, UK
- Cinematography: Peter Jessop
- Running time: 60 minutes
- Production company: LWT

Original release
- Network: ITV
- Release: 18 May – 22 June 1997

Wokenwell is a six-part British television crime drama series, first broadcast on 18 May 1997, that aired on ITV. The series was produced by LWT and created by screenwriter Bill Gallagher. The series centred on three policemen and their wives living in the fictional northern England town of Wokenwell. The series was filmed on location in and around the picturesque West Yorkshire village of Marsden.

The series starred Ian McElhinney, Celia Imrie, Nicholas Gleaves, Lesley Dunlop, Jason Done and Nicola Stephenson, with Bryan Pringle and John Malcolm also appearing in supporting roles. On 1 April 1997 a TV-tie in novel, written by Graeme Grant, under the pseudonym Tom McGregor, was released as a prelude to the series.

== Cast ==
- Ian McElhinney as Sgt. Duncan Bonney
- Celia Imrie as June Bonney
- Nicholas Gleaves as PC Rudy Whiteside
- Lesley Dunlop as Lucky Whiteside
- Jason Done as PC Brian Rainford
- Nicola Stephenson as Fran Rainford
- Bryan Pringle as Sadly Stan Potter
- Matthew Knowles as Barry Whiteside
- Samantha Bishop as Natalie Perrin
- Kate Collings as Melissa Price
- Nicola Lumb as Vicky Cullings
- John Malcolm as Doc Seaden

== Episodes ==
No.	Title	Directed by	Written by	Original release date
1	"Meat is Murder"	Julian Farino	Bill Gallagher	18 May 1997
A human finger is found outside a local butcher's shop, prompting rumours about what might be going into the sausages, and threatening the butcher's relationship with his fiancée.
2	"Gentleman of the Road"	Julian Farino	Bill Gallagher	25 May 1997
Wokenwell police investigate a band of travelling people, who claim to have healing powers. The arrival of a new-born baby has unexpected consequences.
3	"Flash Harry's Stalker"	Keith Boak	Bill Gallagher	1 June 1997
A local bus driver claims that he is being hounded by the driver of a mysterious van, but no one else has seen it. Supt 'Razor' Reid visits Wokenwell to review the viability of the local station.
4	"Misery Memoir"	Keith Boak	Bill Gallagher	8 June 1997
A stranger arrives in Wokenwell, claiming to have lost his memory. Investigations into his background suggest he might be dangerous.
5	"The Postman Strikes Twice"	Julian Farino	Bill Gallagher	15 June 1997
When a mystery man in an iron mask launches a campaign of terror in Wokenwell, the local postman comes under suspicion.
6	"Gone Fishing"	Julian Farino	Bill Gallagher	22 June 1997
When Sadly Stan Potter disappears, a local builder, who has been trying to drive him from the village, starts to behave in a bizarre manner.
