= The Plant (film) =

- Genre: Drama / Science Fiction
- Written by: Jonathan Lewis
- Directed by: Jonathan Lewis
- Starring: Joanna Roth; Valentine Pelka
- Composer: Fiachra Trench
- Country of origin: United Kingdom
- No. of episodes: 1

Production
- Producer: Patrick Cassavetti
- Editor: Rodney Holland
- Running time: 90 mn
- Production company: BBC

Original release
- Network: BBC One
- Release: 20 January 1995

The Plant is a British television movie by Jonathan Lewis. It was first broadcast on the BBC in January 1995.

== Synopsis ==
In a garden in a London suburb, corpses sprout out of the earth on during a live television gardening programme called Down to Earth. However, it soon appears that these human bodies are not dead people, they are grown there, like plants. The question is who is growing these bodies and for which purpose.

== Cast ==
- Joanna Roth — Connie
- Valentine Pelka — Max
- Eoin McCarthy — Tom Collins
- Clive Francis — DCI Pinker
- Tim Preece — Alan
- Sally Dexter — Bella
- Doran Godwin — Connie's Mother
