= On the Up =

- Genre: Sitcom
- Created by: Bob Larbey
- Starring: Dennis Waterman; Sam Kelly; Jenna Russell; Joan Sims; Judy Buxton
- Country of origin: United Kingdom
- Original language: English
- No. of series: 3
- No. of episodes: 19

Production
- Running time: 30 minutes

Original release
- Network: BBC1
- Release: 4 September 1990 – 2 November 1992

On the Up is a British sitcom written by Bob Larbey, about the failure of a millionaire's marriage, and his relationship with his assorted live-in staff. The programme was first broadcast on BBC1 between 4 September 1990 and 2 November 1992.

== Plot summary ==
Tony Carpenter is a self-made millionaire who turned his South London minicab firm into a successful chauffeur-driven car service. He lives in a large detached mansion in Esher, surrounded by Rolls Royces and BMWs, with a domestic staff who respect him, and whom he adores: witty and insolent butler/driver Sam (who is also a childhood friend of Tony), acerbic secretary Maggie and cook Mrs Wembley (responsible for the series' catch-phrase of "Just the one", used to respond to the offer of a sherry even if it was her third or fourth).

Despite all these advantages, Tony's life is full of conflict:

- His working-class background and sensibilities make him uncomfortable with the idea of having domestic staff, and in dealing with local snobs.
- Nothing he does seems to please his snooty wife Ruth, who hates his downmarket behaviour, constantly suspects him of infidelity with either his secretary Maggie or friend & model Dawn (both of whom are significantly younger than herself), and cannot abide the "chummy" relationship he has with "servants".
- Then there is daughter Stephanie, away from home at a Public School and thus being inculcated with upper / middle class sensibilities, who is embarrassed by both her father's differing outlook, and by the unsettled relationship between her parents.
- Finally there is his mother, who is still living in a South London terrace, and never seems impressed with his achievements, finding herself unable to understand why he lives "all the way over there" (in reality about 14 miles away) in his big house.

The third series ended with Tony looking set to enter a happy relationship with new love interest Jane Webster, a single mother from Stephanie's school, as well as romantic interests for all three staff, but also closes on a slight cliffhanger as it is displayed that Tony and Ruth still share feelings for each other. A fourth series was initially planned, and was mentioned in in-house BBC literature for the Autumn 1993 season on BBC1, but never came to fruition.

== Cast ==
=== Regular ===
- Dennis Waterman as Tony Carpenter, the lead character, owner of a luxury car hire business in the Surrey "Stockbroker Belt" and ardent supporter of Charlton Athletic. Although he's proud to be a "self-made man" and enjoys the good life his success has brought, Tony is unashamed of his working-class roots and treats his staff more like friends, to the frustration of his wife.
- Sam Kelly as Sam Jones, a friend of Tony since their days at Clapham Parochial School. An ex-Merchant Seaman, Sam was the first driver he ever employed, and now works as chauffeur to the Carpenter family. Although Tony is his boss, Sam still behaves more like a friend towards him and isn't afraid to criticise his behaviour. Sam has feelings for Maggie but believes she prefers Tony; however, in the final episode the two get together.
- Joan Sims as Mrs. Fiona Wembley, the Carpenter family's cordon bleu cook. She is something of a confidante and mother figure for the others in the house and becomes upset if Tony isn't eating properly. Fond of sherry – leading to her largely inaccurate catchphrase "just the one" – her tippling is indulged by Tony; when she fears the sack because Ruth is returning home, she confides in Sam that she worries another employer wouldn't be so understanding. Late in series one it's revealed that she never actually married Mr Wembley, as he was killed in the Korean War before they could.
- Jenna Russell as Maggie Lomax, a young Scottish secretary of strong socialist leanings. She is highly efficient and regularly saves Tony's bacon when things go wrong. She and Ruth make no secret of disliking each other, something which largely stems from Ruth's (accurate) suspicion that Maggie has feelings for Tony. Maggie later gets over Tony and starts a relationship with Sam in the final episode.
- Judy Buxton as Ruth Carpenter, who is described in the title song as regarding her husband as a "bit of rough". She enjoys the good life Tony's money provides but is constantly frustrated by his tendency to treat the staff as friends and his disdain for her upper class friends. She has an on-off lover, Stephen, for whom she leaves Tony more than once.
- Michelle Hatch as Dawn, a lifelong friend-of-the-family and currently a Lingerie Model. Although she enjoys modelling, she is worried about being seen as a dumb blonde and, with Maggie's help, begins taking adult learning classes. She mostly sees Tony as a father figure, but in one episode attempts to seduce him.
- Vanessa Hadaway as Stephanie Carpenter, Ruth and Tony Carpenter's teenage daughter, who attends a very exclusive boarding school. Although both her parents love her, she often ends up a pawn in their power games, with both trying to buy her affection with expensive gifts. Seen as spoilt by the staff, Stephanie's attitude improves somewhat when she gets some tough but genuine love from her grandmother.
- Dora Bryan (series 1) then Pauline Letts (series 2 and 3) as Mrs Carpenter Senior, Tony's Mum. Proudly working class and an ardent supporter of the Labour Party, she thinks Tony has forgotten his roots. She and Ruth share a mutual dislike.
- Fiona Mollison as Jane Webster (Series 2–3), from nearby Cobham, the mother of Stephanie's school friend Marina. She becomes a new love interest for Tony and is liked by his staff, with Mrs Wembley even allowing her to call her "Fiona".

=== Recurring ===
- Jenny Lee as Mrs Purvis, Stephanie's headmistress
- William Lucas as Sir Douglas Hoyle, Mrs Wembley's suitor
- Bunny May as Barry, office manager of Tony Carpenter's car hire business
- Paul Weakley as the singing gardener
- John Harding as Stephen, Ruth's on-off boyfriend and a solicitor

== Music ==
The opening titles are accompanied by the 1st movement of the Handel concerti grossi Op.6 No.11 in A major – a classical instrumental piece, played by the Guildhall String Ensemble. However, the closing credits are accompanied by Dennis Waterman's rendition of the series' custom theme tune. This continues a pattern from Minder, New Tricks and Stay Lucky, shows in which he also starred and sang the theme tune.

== Reception ==
The series performed reasonably well, pulling in decent viewing figures and receiving generally good reaction from the public.

== In popular culture ==
Mrs. Wembley's catch-phrase, "Just the One", in particular, became associated with the series and entered common British lexicon for a time.

== Series overview ==
DVD editions of the individual series, and as a box set, are available.

Series	Episodes	Originally released	
Series	Episodes	First released	Last released
1	7	4 September 1990	16 October 1990
2	6	6 September 1991	11 October 1991
3	6	28 September 1992	2 November 1992

== Episodes ==
=== Series 1 (1990) ===
No. overall	No. in series	Title	Directed by	Written by	Original release date
1	1	"Walking Out"	Gareth Gwenlan	Bob Larbey	4 September 1990
Tony Carpenter has come to grips with his wife leaving. She's always been driving force behind the energy in the house and the social climbing that Tony needs as a self made man. As Tony comforts his daughter Stephanie, they wonder if this is the final straw or will she be back. The house is then thrown into an uproar when news comes through Stephanie has run away from school.
2	2	"Mum"	Gareth Gwenlan	Bob Larbey	11 September 1990
Tony worries how he will explain Ruth walking out on him to his mother. Further concerns about her health push Tony to consider getting her to move in with him. Ruth complicates matters by wanting the question of Stephanie's school open day resolved. Tony and Ruth consider reconciliation, conditional whether they can go a week without a fight.
3	3	"Mr. Burton"	Gareth Gwenlan	Bob Larbey	18 September 1990
Ruth has not returned and Tony asks Dawn to act as a model at his stall advertising his business at an upcoming trade fair. Maggie and Mrs Wembley accompany Dawn to a shop to buy a dress for the occasion, where a woman claims to recognize Mrs Wembley as a Miss Hayward, which she denies. At the fair a group of young upper class louts insult Dawn and Tony and his staff join forces to see them off. Back at the house Dawn expresses her gratitude to the others for coming to her defence and later propositions Tony, though he turns her down. Mrs Wembley explains that she is not who they think she is.
4	4	"Dawn"	Gareth Gwenlan	Bob Larbey	25 September 1990
Ruth visits, accusing Tony – wrongly – of having had sex with Dawn and announcing that she will not be accompanying him to Stephanie's school open day. He takes the staff instead and an angry Stephanie runs off before telling him she is unsettled by her parents' situation. At least Mrs Wembley acquires an influential new admirer, Sir Douglas Hoyle, chairman of the school governors who comes home to cook zabaglione with her.
5	5	"Maggie's Dad"	Gareth Gwenlan	Bob Larbey	2 October 1990
Tony employs his first woman driver, a strident feminist who almost causes a walk-out. Maggie's dour father also comes to visit and makes it clear he has no truck with working-class people living above their stations. Both matters are resolved thanks to Tony's mum as he organises her birthday party at his house.
6	6	"Douglas"	Gareth Gwenlan	Bob Larbey	9 October 1990
Sam gets a call to drive a mystery woman to the airport. It turns out to be Ruth, who is going on holiday with a new lover but did not have the guts to tell Tony herself and wanted Sam to pass on the message. Tony is, however, much cheered when Sir Douglas, now dating Mrs Wembley, agrees to put in a word for him to join the golf club.
7	7	"Barbados"	Gareth Gwenlan	Bob Larbey	16 October 1990
Tony resigns from the golf club in protest at the president's anti-Semitism. He then suggests a holiday in Barbados to Maggie, which she sees initially as a knee-jerk reaction to Ruth's trip with her new boyfriend. She is persuaded after Sam is also invited and later Mrs Wembley, expecting a marriage proposal from Sir Douglas and not the offer of being his cook, also comes aboard. Dawn, being hounded by the press after an affair with a footballer, makes up the party. At the airport Tony sees Ruth returning from her holiday, which does not seem to have gone that well.

=== Series 2 (1991) ===
No. overall	No. in series	Title	Directed by	Written by	Original release date
8	1	"After the Holiday"	Gareth Gwenlan	Bob Larbey	6 September 1991
Returning from holiday with his staff Tony finds Ruth in his bed. She is anxious to make a fresh start with him but, knowing the mutual antipathy that exists between her and his staff, he has to be extra diplomatic. When his mother comes to visit, announcing that she would like to move in, everybody expects Ruth to react badly but she is surprisingly welcoming.
9	2	"Ruth Makes an Effort"	Gareth Gwenlan	Bob Larbey	13 September 1991
Tony's mum comes to live with him and, whilst Ruth promises to make the effort to get on with her, they are soon disagreeing. Mum identifies with the staff and wants to eat with them whilst Ruth believes that a formal family dinner is in order. Maggie confesses to Mum that she dislikes Ruth but it is the older Mrs Carpenter who, deciding to muck in and help out, drives the cleaning lady away.
10	3	"Maggie Gives Notice"	Gareth Gwenlan	Bob Larbey	20 September 1991
Stephanie comes to stay and Ruth takes her shopping in London. Nonetheless Maggie finds it difficult to be civil to Ruth and gives her notice. Tony then discovers that Ruth has bought a flat in London just for the family and he realises how much he needs his staff around him. After cajoling from Sam and his mother he tells Maggie he refuses to accept her notice. Everybody is happy – except Ruth, who retreats to the new flat whilst the others celebrate.
11	4	"Competition"	Gareth Gwenlan	Bob Larbey	27 September 1991
Having carpeted dim driver Chalky Smith for moonlighting Tony assumes that similar practice by other drivers is responsible for the fall in his returns but, having sent Dawn undercover, learns that he is being under-cut by ruthless younger rival Jimmy Quinn. Using Chalky as his inside man Tony devises a plan that will leave Quinn substantially out of pocket whilst Tony undercuts him even further.
12	5	"Meeting Jane Webster"	Gareth Gwenlan	Bob Larbey	4 October 1991
Tony's mother decides to move back to London, believing she is the reason Ruth is living apart from her son. She goes to see her and tells her not to be a part-time wife though it has little effect and Ruth stays in the flat. Tony takes Stephanie back to school, where he meets Jane Webster, a charming and down-to-earth single parent and they go for a meal together. It is not long before the staff know all about it.
13	6	"A Date with Jane Webster"	Gareth Gwenlan	Bob Larbey	11 October 1991
Ruth arrives to talk about Stephanie and manages to antagonize the staff but suggests Tony meet her at the flat to discuss their future. Tony and the staff go to a football match before he drives to the flat but finds Ruth is not there. On the rebound he takes Jane to dinner but she makes it clear she is not there to be used so Tony returns home to find an irate Ruth. She had been in a traffic accident and tried to ring the house with no success. Finally Ruth and Tony decide that sex is perhaps a better idea than discussion – for the time being.

=== Series 3 (1992) ===
No. overall	No. in series	Title	Directed by	Written by	Original release date
14	1	"The Golf Tournament"	Paul Harrison	Bob Larbey	28 September 1992
Ruth has moved back in and decides to throw a fancy dress party, an idea which meets with general approval. However Tony then discovers that he is meant to be playing in a Pro-Am golf tournament in Ireland on that day. Ruth agrees to cancel the party, but Tony, not wanting her to act the martyr, agrees to cancel the golf tournament instead. They settle for a romantic evening in front of the fire as opposed to the other options. Maggie has forgotten to notify the guests that the party is off, and brightly costumed people enter the house.
15	2	"The Fishing Trip"	Paul Harrison	Bob Larbey	5 October 1992
Dawn is a regular visitor to Tony's house as Maggie is helping her pass her English exams but Maggie cannot resist telling Ruth that Dawn and Tony have gone fishing together. As a result Ruth spitefully tries to sack Maggie, causing Sam and Mrs Wembley to walk out. However Tony reinstates all of them and Ruth returns to London defeated. Maggie nonetheless decides to take a break, so Mrs Wembley suggests Dawn improve her social skills by acting as Tony's temporary secretary.
16	3	"Temporary Secretary"	Paul Harrison	Bob Larbey	12 October 1992
Dawn arrives to become Tony's secretary in Maggie's absence but she has no typing or computer skills. When half of Tony's drivers go down with 'flu though, Dawn, Sam and Tony take their places, leaving a confused Mrs Wembley in the office with Tony's mum. At least Tony gets a welcome fare in Jane, who agrees to another date whilst Sam comes to Mrs Wembley's defence against a rude gardener.
17	4	"Parental Choice"	Paul Harrison	Bob Larbey	19 October 1992
When Stephanie phones to say she is unable to get through to Ruth to collect her for half-term Tony arrives at the school, with Jane, to a frosty reception from Ruth, who has turned up after all. Stephanie opts to go home with Tony though she is unhappy with her parents' situation and feels torn between them as to where to spend the half-term. Tony's mum comes up with a classic compromise whilst Mrs Wembley, after Sam's having sacked the previous gardener for insulting her, finds the perfect replacement.
18	5	"Stephanie"	Paul Harrison	Bob Larbey	26 October 1992
Tony plays tennis with Jane before taking her to the house, where she makes a very good impression on the staff. Before she and Tony can get cosy Ruth storms in, angry that Stephanie went to stay with her grandma without telling her and announcing that she is leaving Tony for good. Tony suggests they see his mother to get Stephanie's side of things but Stephanie and her Gran are at the greyhound races.
19	6	"Divorce"	Paul Harrison	Bob Larbey	2 November 1992
Ruth demands a family meeting as she wants a divorce and wants to know with whom Stephanie will be living. Stephanie explains that she is sick of being in the middle and expected to take sides and opts to go with Tony's mother. Everybody is thrilled to learn that Ruth will be moving in with her boyfriend Stephen and that they will never have to see her again. To celebrate Maggie kisses Sam and Tony asks Jane Webster out to dinner.

== See also ==
- Joking Apart, another sitcom about the failure of a marriage
