= Memento Mori (novel) =

Novel by Muriel Spark

- First edition (UK)
- Author: Muriel Spark
- Cover artist: Victor Reinganum
- Language: English
- Publisher: Macmillan (UK); Lippincott (US)
- Publication date: January 1959
- Publication place: United Kingdom
- Media type: Print, audio, and eBook
- OCLC: 1619422

Memento Mori is a novel by Scottish author Muriel Spark published by Macmillan in 1959. The title (Latin for "remember you must die"), references a common trope. This is represented in the novel by a series of insidious phone calls made to the elderly Dame Lettie Colston and her acquaintances. The recipients reflect on their past lives while they try to identify who is making the calls and why.

== Plot ==
The plot revolves around a circle of elderly upper-class Britons and their acquaintances, with a third-person omniscient narrator following multiple individuals. The centre of the group is Dame Lettie Colston, OBE, a former "committee member" who has retired from extensive work in prison reform. Other major characters include her brother Godfrey, the heir to and retired head of a brewing company; Godfrey's wife Charmian, a successful novelist; and Charmian's former maid Jean Taylor, who is now in a public nursing home.

The plot is ostensibly driven by phonecalls that Dame Lettie receives in which she is civilly told: "Remember you must die." The caller seems to be able to track her whereabouts. It gradually emerges that all the Colstons and their elderly acquaintances are receiving these calls, although each individual has a different experience of the caller: some describe him as young, others as foreign, others as old. Inspector Mortimer, a retired policeman asked to consult on the case, hears the message from a woman. Each individual also has a different reaction to the message, ranging from paranoia (Lettie) to anger (Godfrey) to acceptance (Charmian). The caller is never identified nor caught, despite a police investigation, and Mortimer and Jean Taylor believe that it is Death itself.

Another major plot element involves the estate of Lisa Brooke, a woman who has had an affair with Godfrey, competed with Charmian over a man named Guy Leet, and forced Leet to marry her, but who dies of natural causes early in the novel. Her death causes a succession dispute between her (secret) husband Guy Leet, who is crippled with arthritis and walks with two sticks, Lisa's siblings the Sidebottomes, and Lisa's longtime housekeeper, Mrs Pettigrew, who has a will in her favour made under dubious circumstances. After Lisa's death Mrs Pettigrew goes to care for the partially senile Charmian, who has suffered a stroke, blackmails Godfrey with his past infidelities, and comes to dominate Charmian, threatening to poison her. It is shown late in the novel that Lisa Brooke had in fact married an Irishman, Matthew O'Brien, who has been committed to an asylum most of his life under the delusion that he is God. Since that renders Leet's marriage to Brooke null and void, on O'Brien's death in the asylum the estate passes to Mrs Pettigrew.

Many of the interrelated actions of the group are chronicled by the retired sociologist Alec Warner, who has been in the past romantically involved with Jean Taylor and Lettie Colston. Warner undertakes a massive ten-year study on gerontology, and takes copious notes on all the events he observes, including the "threatening" telephone message, but he loses them all in a fire at his flat and "feels dead" from regret over their loss. Alec regularly visits Jean Taylor, whose presence in a nursing home with numerous "Grannies" and other geriatric cases provides a sane perspective on ageing in an institution.

Lettie Colston loses her housekeeper Gwen to her growing paranoia, disconnects her phone, and falls victim to a home invasion planned on information unwittingly and indirectly obtained from Gwen. Lettie is bludgeoned to death with her own stick.

The novel concludes with the deaths of almost all the major characters, as well as a description of the twilight years of surviving individuals.

== Television adaptation ==
It was adapted for television in 1992 by the BBC, directed by Jack Clayton and starring Dame Maggie Smith, Dame Thora Hird, Sir Michael Hordern, Renée Asherson, Maurice Denham, Stephanie Cole, and Zoë Wanamaker. It was shown in the United States by Masterpiece Theatre.

There was previously a 1975 West German television adaptation Memento Mori starring Lil Dagover.
