= Room at the Bottom (1967 TV series) =

1967 British TV comedy series

- Genre: Sitcom
- Written by: John Esmonde; Bob Larbey
- Starring: Kenneth Connor; Deryck Guyler; Brian Wilde
- Country of origin: United Kingdom
- Original language: English
- No. of series: 1
- No. of episodes: 7

Production
- Producer: David Askey
- Running time: 30 minutes
- Production company: BBC

Original release
- Network: BBC 1
- Release: 14 March – 25 April 1967

Room at the Bottom is a British comedy television series that originally aired as a pilot in 1966 on the Comedy Playhouse and a single series of seven episodes on BBC 1 the following year. Set in the maintenance department of a large company tower block, it was the first sitcom by the writing team of John Esmonde and Bob Larbey. All episodes from this series are currently believed to be lost due to wiping.

== Cast ==
=== Main ===
- Kenneth Connor as Gus Fogg
- Deryck Guyler as Mr. Powell
- Gordon Rollings as Happy Brazier
- Kenny Lynch as Horace Robinson
- Brian Wilde as Mr. Salisbury
- John Horsley as Lord Percy

=== Guest ===
- Patrick Newell as Cyril Culpepper
- Yvonne Antrobus as Betty
- Jack Bligh as Uncle Percy
- Richard Coleman as Dillington
- Frances Collins as Miss Edgeworthy
- Eric Dodson as Director
- John Dunbar as Mr. Walpole
- Janina Faye as Gloria
- Wendy Gifford as Miss Bryant
- Bill Horsley as Slocombe
- Len Jones as Boy
- John Scott Martin as Morris Dancer
- Henry McGee as Mr. Hopkins
- Geraldine Newman as Miss Mandrake
- Richard O'Sullivan as The Honourable Tarquin
- Lynn Rainbow as Wendy
- Colin Rix as Hawkins
- Jo Rowbottom as Millie
- Bill Shine as Club Steward
- Thorley Walters as Lord Fareham

== Bibliography ==
- Perry, Christopher. The British Television Pilot Episodes Research Guide 1936-2015. 2015.
