= Rupert of Hentzau =

1898 novel by Anthony Hope

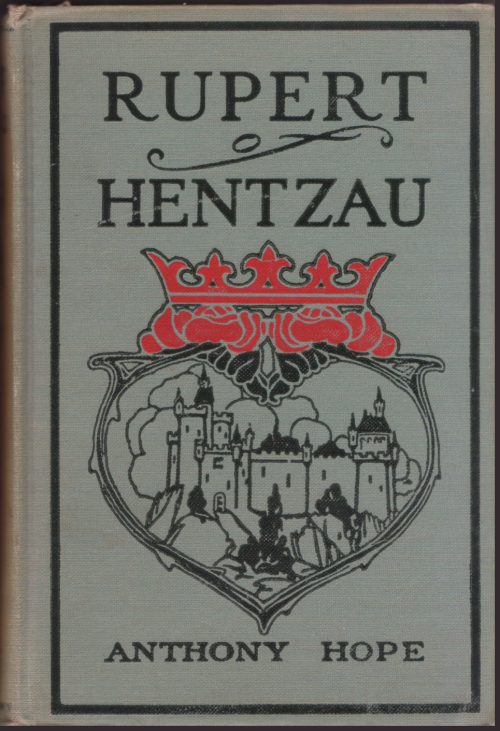
- Cover of 1898 United States Grosset & Dunlap edition
- Author: Anthony Hope
- Illustrator: Charles Dana Gibson
- Genre: Adventure novel
- Publisher: J. W. Arrowsmith, Bristol & London
- Publication date: 1898 (written in 1895)
- Publication place: United Kingdom
- Media type: Print (hardback and paperback)
- Pages: 385 pp
- Preceded by: The Prisoner of Zenda

Rupert of Hentzau is a sequel by Anthony Hope to The Prisoner of Zenda, written in 1895 but not published in book form until 1898.

The novel was serialized in The Pall Mall Magazine and McClure's Magazine from December 1897 through June 1898.

== Synopsis ==
The story is set within a framing narrative told by a supporting character from The Prisoner of Zenda. The frame implies that the events related in both books took place in the late 1870s and early 1880s. This story commences three years after the conclusion of Zenda, and deals with the same fictional country somewhere in Germanic Middle Europe, the kingdom of Ruritania. Most of the same characters recur: Rudolf Elphberg, the dissolute absolute monarch of Ruritania; Rudolf Rassendyll, the English gentleman who had acted as his political decoy, being his distant cousin and look-alike; Flavia, the princess, now queen; Rupert of Hentzau, the dashing well-born villain; Fritz von Tarlenheim, the loyal courtier; Colonel Sapt, the King's bodyguard; Lieutenant von Bernenstein, a loyal soldier.

Queen Flavia, dutifully but unhappily married to her cousin Rudolf V, writes to her true love Rudolf Rassendyll. The letter is to be delivered by hand by von Tarlenheim, but von Tarlenheim is betrayed by Bauer, his servant, and it is stolen by the exiled Rupert of Hentzau and his loyal cousin the Count of Luzau-Rischenheim. Hentzau sees in it a chance to return to favour by informing the pathologically jealous and paranoid King.

Rassendyll returns to Ruritania to aid the Queen, but is once more forced to impersonate the King after Rupert fatally shoots Rudolf V in a remote hunting lodge. After tracing Bauer to the house of Mother Holf, Rassendyll and Rupert engage in an epic duel. Hentzau is mortally wounded, and Rassendyll burns the letter. However, he is assassinated in his hour of triumph by Bauer—and thus is spared a crisis of conscience over whether or not to continue the royal deception for years.

Rassendyll is buried as the King in a state funeral, while Sapt and Rassendyll's servant James stage a fire at the hunting lodge that burns the King's body beyond recognition. Rudolf V is buried as Rudolf Rassendyll, while Flavia reigns on alone, the last of the Elphberg dynasty.

== Adaptations ==
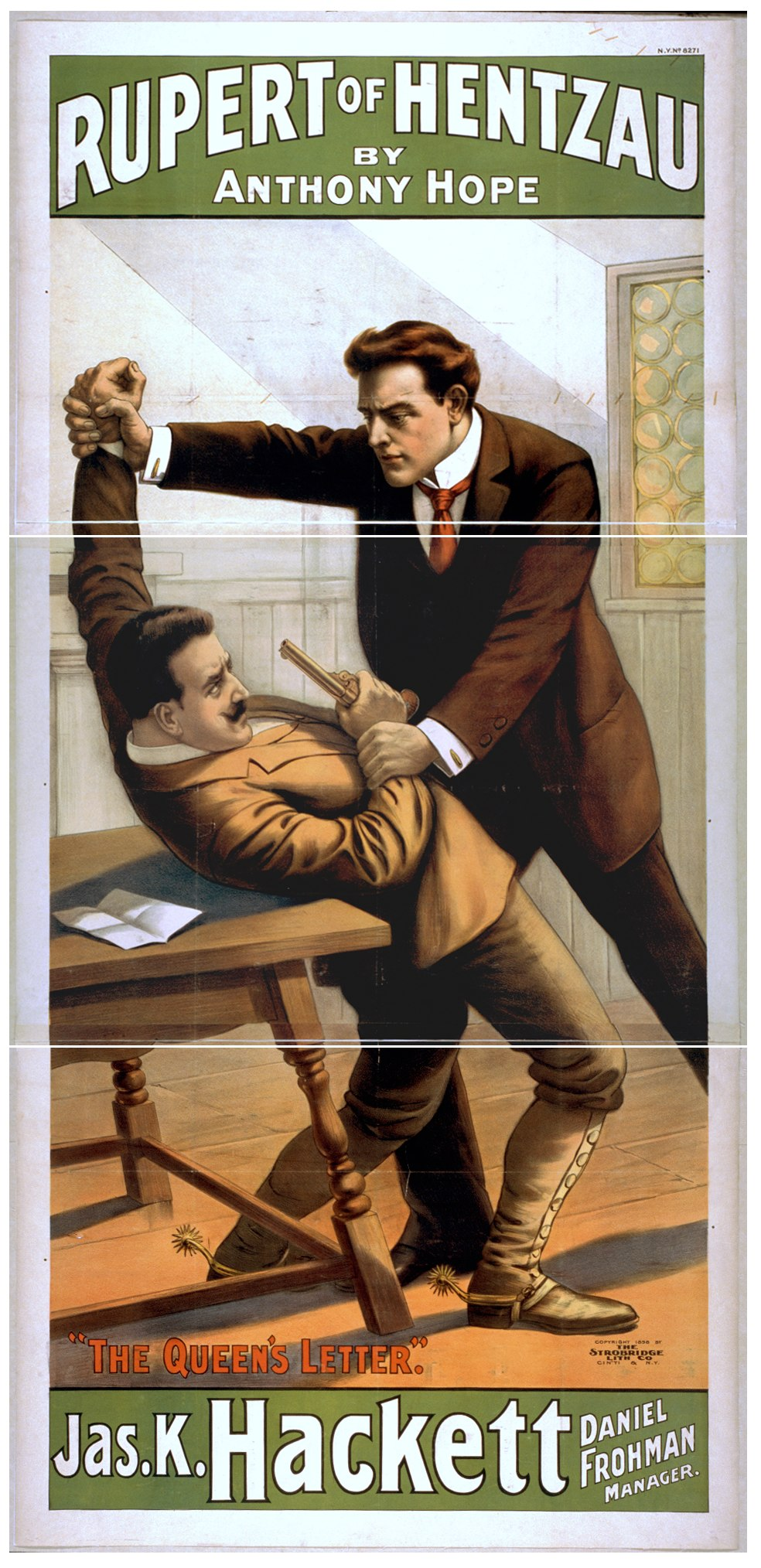
James K. Hackett starred in Daniel Frohman's 1898 stage production of Rupert of Hentzau.

=== Stage ===
After a successful year on tour, a theatrical adaptation of Rupert of Hentzau opened at the Lyceum Theatre in New York City on April 10, 1899. Written by Anthony Hope with contributions by Edward Everett Rose, the play starred James K. Hackett in the dual roles of King Rudolf and Rudolf Rassendyll.

=== Film ===
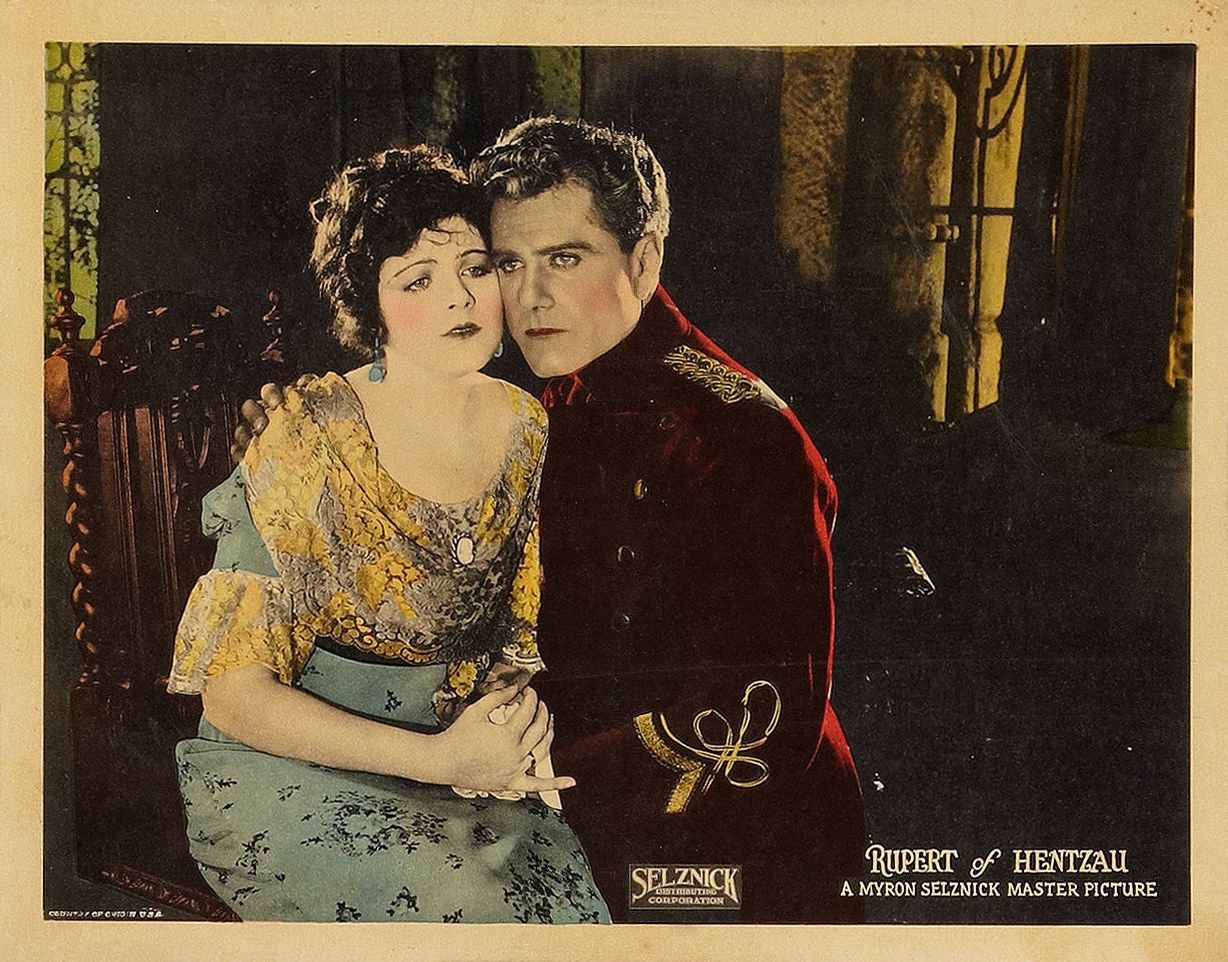
Elaine Hammerstein and Bert Lytell in Rupert of Hentzau (1923)

Several motion picture adaptations were made, although not as many as for Zenda. Film versions of Rupert of Hentzau include the following:

- 1915 film version Rupert of Hentzau starring Gerald Ames in the title role and Henry Ainley as Rassendyl
- 1923 Selznick Pictures film with Lew Cody as Rupert, turning the tragic ending on its head: Flavia abdicates to marry Rassendyll, and Ruritania is declared a republic).
- A spoof version, Rupert of Hee Haw, was released in 1924. Stan Laurel plays an alcoholic king, whose queen, Mae Laurel, deposes and replaces him with an identical salesman named Rudolph Razz. Razz's manners are so uncourtly that a courtier, James Finlayson, challenges him to a duel. (See also Lord Haw-haw.)
- A 1957 British TV movie Rupert of Hentzau starring John Westbrook as Rudolf Rassendyll/The King, Sarah Lawson as Queen Flavia, Robert Shaw as Rupert of Hentzau, Stanley Van Beers as Colonel Sapt, Maurice Kaufmann as Fritz von Tarlenheim, Jennifer Wright as Helga von Tarlenheim, John Gabriel, Paul Eddington as the Count Luzau-Rischenheim, Jeremy Burnham as Lieutenant Bernenstein, Diana Lamnert as Rosa Holf, Meadows White as James and Margery Caldicott as Mother Holf.
- A 1964 British television series Rupert of Hentzau starring George Baker as Rudolf Rassendyl/The King, Barbara Shelley as Queen Flavia, Peter Wyngarde as Rupert of Hentzau, John Phillips as Colonel Sapt (renamed Zapt), Tristram Jellinek as Fritz von Tarlenheim, Derek Blomfield as the Count of Luzau-Rischenheim, John Breslin as Bauer and Mark Burns as Lieutenant Bernenstein. All six episodes are now lost.

David O. Selznick considered making a film version of the novel, as a follow-up to his hugely successful 1937 film of The Prisoner of Zenda, using again Douglas Fairbanks Jr. He decided not to because of the tragic subject matter and his commitment to filming Gone with the Wind. The 1923 silent film version had been produced by his father, Lewis J. Selznick, and his brother, Myron Selznick.

On screen, Rupert as a character has been played by matinee idols such as Ramon Novarro (1922), Douglas Fairbanks, Jr. (1937), and James Mason (1952).
