= Candida Baker =

Australian writer

Candida Baker (born 1955) is an Australian author, photographer, journalist and natural horsemanship practitioner. She was born in England and moved to Australia in 1977.

== Biography ==
Baker was born into a literary and theatrical family; her grandfather, J. C. Squire, was a British poet, writer, historian and influential literary editor, her father was George Baker MBE (actor) and her mother, Julia Squire, was a costume and set designer. Baker first came to Australia as an understudy with a Royal Shakespeare Company tour of The Hollow Crown in 1976 and subsequently moved to Australia in 1977.

== Career ==
In 1982 Baker embarked on a ten-year writing project, interviewing 36 Australian writers for her Yacker – Australian Writers Talk About Their Work series, published by Picador and based on The Paris Review interviews with writers. In 1983 she and her then-partner Robert Drewe moved to Melbourne where Baker worked at The Age newspaper for a year before she was offered the position of Arts Editor at Time Australia magazine.

In 1988, The Age newspaper offered Baker a position as a features writer based in Sydney, a position she held for seven years. Baker was subsequently deputy editor of the Good Weekend, arts editor of the Sydney Morning Herald, and for five years editor of The Australian's Weekend Australian Magazine.

Between 1986 and 1999 Yacker 1, 2, and 3, were all published, and Baker's first novel, Women and Horses, was a runner-up in the prestigious Vogel Australian Literary Awards in 1990. It was published in Australia by Picador, and in the U.S as a hardback by St. Martin's Press.

In 1994 Baker's book of short stories, The Powerful Owl, was also published by Picador. The title story was runner-up in The Canberra Times short story competition and has been included in numerous anthologies, including The Penguin Century of Australian Stories.

In 2000 Baker's second novel, The Hidden, was published by Knopf, and included Baker's own photographs – a theme she would continue later in her anthologies. In 2001 Baker left News Ltd and moved out from Sydney to the Byron Bay hinterland to pursue an interest in natural horsemanship and from where she continues to write articles and books. In 2017 she was appointed President of Save a Horse Australia.

Baker was appointed Director of the 2011 Byron Bay Writers' Festival, and director of the Northern Rivers Writers' Centre. Guests for the Festival included John Pilger, Louis de Bernières and Paul Kelly.

In 2014 Baker started Verandah Magazine an online arts, culture and lifestyle magazine covering the Byron Bay and Northern Rivers region, which includes numerous local contributors. She is also a regular book reviewer for the Sydney Morning Herald and has also reviewed for The Times Literary Supplement.

Baker has edited a number of anthologies, including The Penguin Book of the Horse and with Allen & Unwin as publisher she edited and contributed to The Infinite Magic of Horses, The Wonderful World of Dogs, The Amazing Life of Cats and The Wisdom of Women. She also co-edited How Fast is the Wind?: An Anthology of Horse Poems with Robbie Coburn. Her writing has also appeared in numerous other anthologies, including Fathers (ed Ross Fitzgerald); Women Love Sex (ed Susan Johnson); Loves (Jean Bedford); The Penguin Book of the Beach (ed Robert Drewe) and The Penguin Book of the City (ed Robert Drewe).

She has written three children’s books, The Little Angels Counting Book, I Know That and Belinda the Ninja Ballerina published by Ford Street in 2015, and she is currently working on her third novel. In 2015 Baker also edited and wrote an essay for arts philanthropist Pat Corrigan's book Gabori, the Pat Corrigan Collection of Paintings by Sally Gabori, published by Pan Macmillan.

In 2017 she collaborated with film-maker Marie Craven, creating three film/poetry videos which have been shown around the world. The pair also took part in a poetry collaboration with Chaucer Cameron and Helen Dewbery – ‘Elephant’s Footprint’.

Baker has an MA in Art History from the University of Adelaide.

== Personal life ==
Candida Baker is the eldest daughter of English actor George Baker MBE. Born in London and raised in the small hamlet of Rousham in Oxfordshire, Baker immigrated to Australia when she was 22 after covering the London-to-Sydney car rally. She lived with and later married the respected Australian writer and journalist Robert Drewe whom she met when they were both working at Australian Consolidated Press. Baker and Drewe were together for 25 years, and had two children before moving to the North Coast of New South Wales. Drewe and Baker separated in 2006. Their son, Sam Drewe is a designer and owner of the label Samson & Bronc.
