= Rupert of Hee Haw =

1924 film

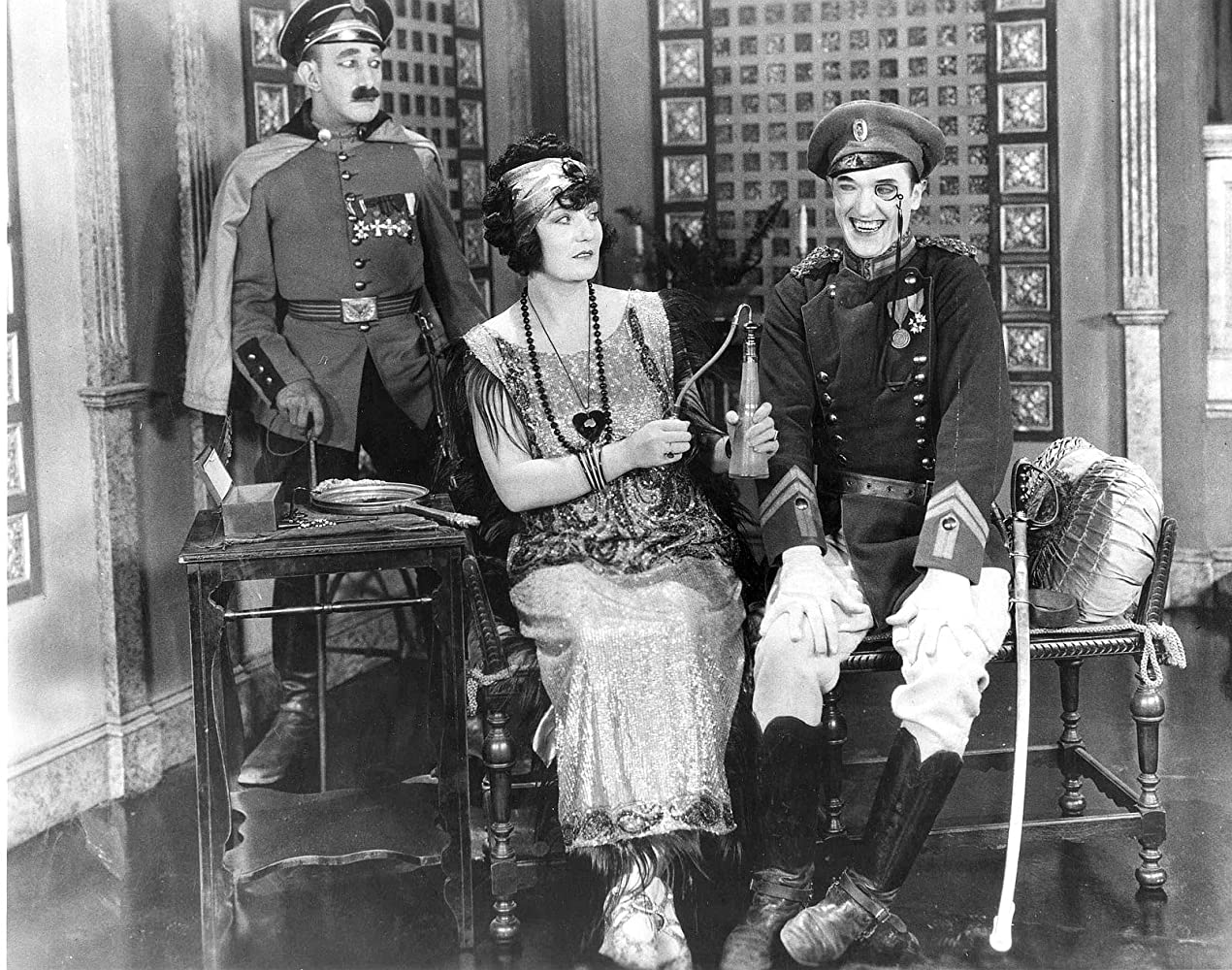
- L-R: James Finlayson, Mae Laurel, Stan Laurel in Rupert of Hee Haw
- Directed by: Scott Pembroke
- Written by: H. M. Walker
- Produced by: Hal Roach
- Starring: Stan Laurel
- Cinematography: Frank Young
- Edited by: Thomas J. Crizer
- Release date: June 8, 1924
- Running time: 20 minutes
- Country: United States
- Languages: Silent film English intertitles

Rupert of Hee Haw is a 1924 American silent film starring Stan Laurel and drawing on the Ruritanian romance of Rupert of Hentzau, Anthony Hope's sequel to The Prisoner of Zenda. A print of this film exists.

== Plot ==
In some European castle the King (Stan) is getting royally drunk. His guests, mainly in Prussian style uniforms, await downstairs but he struggles to get down. When the cuckoo clock sounds he shoots it. The King wants more drink. The princess says he needs a punch on the nose. She sends a message to Rudolph, an American style gent who looks just like the King. He tells Princess Minnie that Count Aspirin intercepted her letter. Count Aspirin arrives but he knows Rupert is not the King because he is not drunk. The missing letter gets grabbed from one person to the next.

Outside Rupert is cheered by a small group of children who thinks he is the King. As he bends to talk to a small girl a boy kicks his backside so he goes back inside. Rupert goes to his "mountain house in London". Rupert and Rudolph have a sword duel as Lady Pott Dome lazes and eats chocolates. Princess Minnie arrives and gives Rudolph a note: "I never want to see you again" she leaves with Count Bromo.

== Cast ==
- Stan Laurel - The King/Rudolph Razz
- James Finlayson - Rupert of Hee Haw
- Mae Laurel - The Princess Minnie Hee Haw
- Billy Engle - Short officer
- Ena Gregory - Hee Haw's maid
- Sammy Brooks - Palace guard
- Pierre Couderc - The Duke of Aspirin
- George Rowe - The Duke of Bromo

== See also ==
- List of American films of 1924
