= List of Only Fools and Horses episodes =

List of episodes of the BBC sitcom

British sitcom Only Fools and Horses was broadcast in the United Kingdom on BBC One between 8 September 1981 and 25 December 2003, and has aired 64 episodes across seven series and nineteen Christmas specials, all written by John Sullivan.

Additionally, twelve special editions of the show were made; two of these ("Licensed to Drill" and "The Robin Flies at Dawn") have never been broadcast commercially and some were only latterly rediscovered.

== Series overview ==
Series
Series	Episodes	Originally released	
Series	Episodes	First released	Last released
1	6	8 September 1981	13 October 1981
1	Special	28 December 1981	
2	7	21 October 1982	2 December 1982
2	Special	30 December 1982	
3	7	10 November 1983	22 December 1983
3	Special	25 December 1983	
4	7	21 February 1985	4 April 1985
4	Special	25 December 1985	
5	6	31 August 1986	5 October 1986
5	Special	25 December 1986	
5	Special	25 December 1987	
6	Special	25 December 1988	
6	6	8 January 1989	12 February 1989
6	Special	25 December 1989	
7	Special	25 December 1990	
7	6	30 December 1990	3 February 1991
‘91 to ‘93 Specials	2	24 December 1991	25 December 1991
‘91 to ‘93 Specials	1	25 December 1992	
‘91 to ‘93 Specials	1	25 December 1993	
Christmas Trilogy	3	25 December 1996	29 December 1996
‘01 to ‘03 Specials	1	25 December 2001	
‘01 to ‘03 Specials	1	25 December 2002	
‘01 to ‘03 Specials	1	25 December 2003	

== Episodes ==
=== Series 1 (1981) ===
No.	Title	Produced by	Directed by	Running time	Original release date	UK viewers (millions)
Series One (1981)
1	"Big Brother"	Ray Butt	Martin Shardlow	29:55	8 September 1981	9.2
Derek "Del Boy" Trotter employs his younger brother, Rodney, as his assistant in his company, Trotters Independent Traders. At Peckham's local pub, The Nag's Head, Del and Rodney meet Del's friend Trigger (who believes that Rodney's name is Dave), and he sells them 25 briefcases for £200. Back at their flat in Nelson Mandela House, the Trotters discover that the briefcases cannot be opened because the combinations for the locks have been inadvertently locked inside. The following day, Rodney attempts to run away to Hong Kong, although he eventually returns to Peckham after forgetting his passport. Del takes his brother's advice and discards the stolen briefcases in the river.
2	"Go West Young Man"	Ray Butt	Martin Shardlow	30:44	15 September 1981	6.1
Del's second-hand car dealer friend from Lewisham, Boycie, has recently bought a Jaguar E-Type for his "bit on the side", and Del agrees to hide it in his garage for a week so that Boycie's wife, Marlene, does not see it. In exchange, Boycie sells Del an old Ford Cortina for £25, which Rodney describes as a "death trap" due to its poor condition. Del subsequently sells the car to an Australian man (Nick Stringer) for £199, claiming that the car was previously owned by a vicar. Later, the brothers decide to go on a night out in London's pubs and clubs, taking Boycie's Jaguar. Rodney finds a club and suggests that he and Del try it out, but they leave quickly when they realise it is actually a gay club. The brothers finally find a different club and meet two young women, who give the Trotters their phone numbers. On the way home, a car crashes into the back of the Jaguar owing to its poor brakes. Unfortunately for Del and Rodney, it is the Australian man from earlier.
3	"Cash and Curry"	Ray Butt	Martin Shardlow	29:51	22 September 1981	7.3
Eager to forge new business links, Del befriends Vimmal Malik (Ahmed Khalil), a wealthy businessman who seems eager to work with Trotters Independent Traders. After a dance at the Camberwell Chamber of Trade, Del and Vimmal are cornered by Mr Ram (Renu Setna) and his heavy. Mr Ram later explains that Vimmal is holding on to an expensive porcelain family heirloom that belongs to the Ram family – and they want it back. To try to make an impression, Del offers to mediate between the two men, especially as Mr Ram says he will pay £4,000 for the return of the statue to his family. Unluckily for Del, it is all a scam and he loses £2,000 to Vimmal and Ram, a couple of conmen touring the country, using the same trick on local businessmen wherever they go.
4	"The Second Time Around"	Ray Butt	Martin Shardlow	30:14	29 September 1981	7.8
Del Boy is shocked to hear that one of his many ex-fiancées, Pauline Harris (Jill Baker), is back in Peckham after returning from America. Soon, much to Rodney and Grandad's horror, Del and Pauline are engaged again, despite Pauline's husband having recently died from what Del is told was food poisoning. The Trotters leave Nelson Mandela House and give Pauline five days to pack her bags and get out. The family arrive at what they believe is their great-aunt Rose's house, but it turns out that she moved out ages ago. Pauline leaves the Trotters' flat, but also phones Tim the Talking Clock in America and leaves the phone off the hook.
5	"A Slow Bus to Chingford"	Ray Butt	Martin Shardlow	29:50	6 October 1981	7
Del interrupts Rodney's romantic evening with his girlfriend to tell Rodney that he has secured him a job as a night watchman at a bus depot. The following morning, Del confesses that the bus company offered to give him a double-decker bus in exchange for Rodney becoming a night watchman. Del Boy uses the bus to set up a tour company taking tourists around London, but on the day, nobody turns up. On the bus, Del reveals that he does not know any facts about London and would, therefore, give the tourists false information. Grandad wins a £50 bet against Del when nobody turns up by the end of the day, but his celebrations are short-lived when Del finds all the leaflets that Grandad chucked down the rubbish chute.
6	"The Russians Are Coming"	Ray Butt	Martin Shardlow	30:14	13 October 1981	8.8
Another successful dodgy deal means that Del has over £1,000 worth of lead from a demolished factory to get rid of. When Rodney discovers that the three tons of lead are, in fact, a DIY fallout shelter, Del refuses to believe him until he reads the accompanying brochure. With the threat of nuclear holocaust preying on Rodney's mind, he asks Del what he would do if he heard the four-minute warning. Without an answer, Del considers putting a survival plan into action, which means reaching Grandad's allotment in time to take shelter. It is during a practice run that they get stopped for speeding by the police – they never find out whether they would make it in time so decide to move the shelter somewhere else.
Christmas Special (1981)
7	"Christmas Crackers"	Bernard Thompson	Bernard Thompson	33:35	28 December 1981	7.5
It is Christmas, and Del and Rodney are waiting for Grandad's traditional abysmal Christmas dinner to arrive at the table. But it turns out that, for once, after dinner and the exchange of gifts (including £20 given to Grandad by Del), Grandad is going to an OAP party, meaning that the Trotter brothers can hit the Monte Carlo Club. Unfortunately, Rodney is unable to attract any women, and, when he does finally make some progress, he is beaten by two other men, much to his and Del's horror.

=== Series 2 (1982) ===
No.	Title	Produced by	Directed by	Running time	Original release date	UK viewers (millions)
Series Two (1982)
8	"The Long Legs of the Law"	Ray Butt	Ray Butt	28:18	21 October 1982	7.7
Rodney is feeling depressed after a dreadful night out with Del and two women, a mother and daughter. Del explains to Grandad that while he and Rodney were out, a fight broke out at one of the pubs and a young policewoman arrived to deal with the situation, whom Rodney tried to date while she carried out the arrest. At Sid's café, Del learns that Rodney did manage to get a date with the policewoman, whose name is Sandra (Kate Saunders). Rodney takes Sandra to see a film and then invites her back to Nelson Mandela House, which is bad news for the Trotters, because the flat is full of stolen items. Del is not pleased when Rodney gives away information that could get the Trotters arrested. Luckily, it looks as if the Trotters have got away with it, but, back at her flat, Sandra tells Rodney that she knew from the very beginning that the flat was full of illegal items. Sandra gives the Trotters 24 hours to "spring clean" their flat before she informs the CID. Back at Nelson Mandela House, Del repeatedly threatens to kill Rodney for his actions.
9	"Ashes to Ashes"	Ray Butt	Ray Butt	29:27	28 October 1982	10.1
The Trotters and Trigger attend Trigger's grandmother Alice's funeral. When they visit her old house, Trigger tells Del and Rodney that, while his grandfather Arthur was away fighting in the war, Alice was seeing another man. Back at the flat, Del examines two antique urns that Alice owned, but discovers that one of them contains Arthur's ashes. Grandad fears that Arthur is trying to communicate with him and reveals he was the man that Alice had the affair with. With Trigger away on holiday, Del Boy and Rodney attempt to get rid of the ashes. They remember that Arthur used to be a member of the local bowling club, but have no luck scattering the ashes on the bowling green. They then try to dump the ashes in the Thames but are spotted by a police boat. The brothers nearly give up, but then a road-sweeping lorry passes by and sucks up Arthur's ashes. Del thinks it is appropriate because Arthur used to be a road-sweeper so this would be a "Viking burial". Back at Nelson Mandela House, Del Boy receives a call from Trigger, who reveals that Alice was married twice, a fact that Grandad had failed to mention. When Del looks in the other urn, he discovers that it does, of course, contain more ashes.
10	"A Losing Streak"	Ray Butt	Ray Butt	30:32	4 November 1982	7.5
Del is getting into financial trouble – even his double-headed coin cannot help him win. He is gambling away his money with no sign of stopping and has already lost £150. When Boycie challenges him to a winner-takes-all poker game, Del is eager to host it in his flat in Nelson Mandela House. As the night progresses, Del's luck goes from bad to worse as he ends up owing Boycie all his money, the van, Grandad's cash, Del's jewellery and all the furniture in the flat. But all is not lost, as Del finally turns the tables on Boycie in revenge for fixing all the previous card games in his favour.
11	"No Greater Love"	Ray Butt	Ray Butt	29:25	11 November 1982	8.6
Rodney falls for Irene Mackay (Gaye Brown) – a woman twice his age – and Del Boy is not happy about it. Not only is Irene a lot older than Rodney, but she is also married to a violent criminal who is shortly due to be released from Parkhurst. Concerned for his brother's safety, Del convinces Irene to ditch Rodney, but when Rodney realises Del has been interfering with his personal life again, he is furious. Soon, the newly released Tommy Mackay (David Daker) finds out Irene has been cheating on him with a Trotter and goes looking for revenge. Luckily for Rodney, Tommy finds Del Boy first and, pretending to be Rodney, Del Boy takes the punishment for him. When a bruised and battered Del returns to the Nags Head, he finds out that Rodney has moved on to a new girl who he met at the roller disco.
12	"The Yellow Peril"	Ray Butt	Ray Butt	28:46	18 November 1982	8.2
Trotters Independent Traders has got a job painting a Chinese takeaway, but Del gives the job to Rodney and Grandad, as he is busy. The job is finished, with the Chinese restaurant having had a new lick of yellow paint. Del returns home and greets Trigger, who reveals to Rodney that the paint he supplied Del with is luminous and was stolen from a railway depot. Fortunately, the restaurant's owner Mr Chin (Rex Wei) is delighted with the work, but there is an issue: Del used the paint to paint his mother's grave so now it looks radioactive. Del decides to keep quiet and flees the scene.
13	"It Never Rains..."	Ray Butt	Ray Butt	29:28	25 November 1982	9.5
Trotters Independent Traders has been forced off the market, with the continuing downpour keeping most of Peckham indoors. While the Trotters are drowning their sorrows in The Nag's Head, Alex the travel agent mentions that business is slow and he cannot give holidays away at the moment. As a promotional gimmick, Del suggests offering an 80% discount on a holiday to the next customer in the shop – who just happens to be Del. Having sold sun hats in the rain, Rodney has managed to earn some travel cash. During the whole holiday, Del and Rodney attempt to pursue women, with Del at one point pretending to be French. Grandad, however, cramps their style, especially when they bring two girls back to their apartment, only for the old man to scare them off with his false teeth. Things get more serious when Grandad is arrested. He is worried that the arrest is for an incident during the Spanish Civil War fifty years earlier, but it turns out that he was arrested for jaywalking and is released without charge.
14	"A Touch of Glass"	Ray Butt	Ray Butt	27:57	2 December 1982	10.2
Returning from an auction, the Trotters stop to help a woman whose car has broken down. It is revealed that she is Lady Ridgemere (Elizabeth Benson), wife of Lord Ridgemere (Geoffrey Toone), who owns the Ridgemere Hall Estate. Having towed the lady to her stately home, Del overhears that Lord Ridgemere is having trouble with the firm that he has hired to clean their chandeliers. He wastes no time in offering the Trotters' services as chandelier cleaners for a mere £350. Rodney and Del are up ladders, holding an old sheet to stop a cut-glass chandelier crashing to the floor after Grandad unscrews it. However, Grandad actually unscrews the adjacent chandelier, which falls and smashes on the floor. As a horrified butler walks into the hall, the Trotters make a swift exit.
Christmas Special (1982)
15	"Diamonds Are for Heather"	Ray Butt	Ray Butt	27:54	30 December 1982	9.3
Del has the Christmas blues and drinks away his loneliness at a Spanish night at The Nag's Head. There he meets Heather (Rosalind Lloyd), who seems to be one friend short of company. Del Boy entertains her and sees her home safely. At her flat, he discovers that she has a young son, and her husband seems to have joined a very long queue at the Job Centre 18 months previously and not come back. In no time at all, their romance blossoms and all is running so smoothly that Del decides to propose. However, when he takes her for a candlelit curry, she refuses his offer of marriage. Her husband has returned, employed as a department store Santa, and she wants to give it another go, leaving Del Boy heartbroken.

=== Series 3 (1983) ===
No.	Title	Produced by	Directed by	Running time	Original release date	UK viewers (millions)
Series Three (1983)
16	"Homesick"	Ray Butt	Ray Butt	30:13	10 November 1983	9.4
Carrying shopping up twelve flights of stairs is proving too much for Grandad, and the doctor recommends a new council bungalow for the Trotters. Rodney is appointed the new chairman of the housing committee. He uses his new position to recommend a bungalow for the Trotters. Unknown to Rodney, Del and Grandad have hatched up the scheme between them to get a bungalow frauduently. Rodney pays the price again for Del's scheming and has to resign as chairman.
17	"Healthy Competition"	Ray Butt	Ray Butt	28:03	17 November 1983	9.7
Rodney, tired of his "two GCEs" getting him little more than a job as a lookout, decides to leave Trotters Independent Traders and go into partnership with his friend Mickey Pearce. By the end of the week, he is stuck with a collection of broken lawnmower engines and Mickey has gone on holiday with the partnership's finances.
18	"Friday the 14th"	Ray Butt	Ray Butt	29:41	24 November 1983	9.7
The Trotters are off to Boycie's cottage in Cornwall for the weekend to do some illegal salmon fishing. On the way, a policeman tells the Trotters that an escaped axe-murderer is on the run and is believed to be lurking in the area around the cottage. After a few hours in the cottage, Del believes that he has knocked out the axe-murderer, but when Rodney and Grandad take him to the police station the police tell them that it is actually the gamekeeper. Back at the cottage, Del is with the real axe-murderer (Christopher Malcolm), who is posing as the psychiatric hospital's chief of security. As a police helicopter flies over, Del plays an imaginary game of snooker with the criminal.
19	"Yesterday Never Comes"	Ray Butt	Ray Butt	29:50	1 December 1983	10.6
Del becomes infatuated with Miranda Davenport (Juliet Hammond-Hill), a sophisticated art dealer, and gives her a painting from their flat as a birthday present. Miranda, recognising the painting as valuable, auctions it and tells Del that she has signed documents claiming her family has had it for generations. Del has the last laugh, however, when he explains that his grandmother had stolen it from an art dealer when she worked as a charlady.
20	"May the Force Be with You"	Ray Butt	Ray Butt	29:28	8 December 1983	10.7
Del's former schoolmate, corrupt police officer Roy Slater, is back in Peckham investigating the theft of a microwave. After spotting it in the Trotters' flat, he arrests Del, Rodney and Grandad.
21	"Wanted"	Ray Butt	Ray Butt	29:47	15 December 1983	11.2
When walking home from the pub one night, Rodney assists a drunk woman, who later accuses him of assault. Del recognises her as Blossom (Toni Palmer), a mentally unstable woman, but instead of reassuring Rodney, he jokingly tells him the police are searching for the "Peckham Pouncer". Believing he is a wanted man, Rodney hides in the water tank room of their tower block. Feeling guilty, Del eventually finds him there, guided by the smell of his exotic tobacco.
22	"Who's a Pretty Boy?"	Ray Butt	Ray Butt	29:25	22 December 1983	11.9
To get revenge against Irish painter and decorator Brendan O'Shaughnessy (David Jackson) for supplying him with a tin of "apple white" paint that was actually grey, Del visits his friend Denzil, who is due to have his front room painted by Brendan, and gets the job for himself instead after claiming Brendan was responsible for a house burning down. Grandad and Rodney arrive with the paint, but, unfortunately, Rodney leaves the kettle on and apparently kills Denzil's wife Corrine's (Eva Mottley) pet canary. Grandad buys a new one, but when Corrine returns to the flat, she reveals that the canary died before they arrived. At The Nag's Head, Del meets the new landlord, Mike Fisher, and strikes up a deal to redecorate the pub.
Christmas Special (1983)
23	"Thicker than Water"	Ray Butt	Ray Butt	29:06	25 December 1983	10.8
On Christmas night, Del and Rodney's estranged father Reg (Peter Woodthorpe) returns to the flat for the first time since he walked out following their mother Joan's death in the 1960s. Reg explains that he has been living in Newcastle and has been recently diagnosed with a hereditary blood disorder. Concerned for their wellbeing, he tells Del and Rodney to have blood tests. Both tests return all-clear but the results show Del and Rodney have different blood types. Reg explains that he frequently argued with their mother before her death. She had several dalliances with other men, and Reg claims Del is not his son. Fortunately, a visit to the family doctor gives Del the news to put the smile back on his face.

=== Series 4 (1985) ===
No.	Title	Produced by	Directed by	Running time	Original release date	UK viewers (millions)
Series Four (1985)
24	"Happy Returns"	Ray Butt	Susan Belbin	30:30	21 February 1985	15.15
Derek and Rodney stop a young boy, Jason, from running into the road. Del later escorts him home and discovers that his mother, June Snell (Diane Langton), is an old flame whom he last saw around nineteen years ago. Del and June rekindle their romance. Rodney is dating a lovely girl from the newsagent's called Debbie (Oona Kirsch) – a fact that is seriously curtailing his habit of buying pornographic magazines. It soon transpires that Debbie is June's daughter, and it is almost her 19th birthday. Del concludes that Debbie may well be his daughter. Rodney is distraught when he realises he has fallen in love with a girl who could be his niece. Del finally confronts June to find out whether Debbie is his daughter or not. June admits that Debbie was actually fathered by Del's friend Albie Littlewood, who died crossing the railway line while he was seeing June behind Del's back.
25	"Strained Relations"	Ray Butt	Susan Belbin	29:42	28 February 1985	14.90
Grandad has died and following his funeral, the mourners return to the Trotters' flat for the wake. Rodney is annoyed that Del is having a good time when he should be upset. After everybody leaves, Grandad's brother, Albert, emerges from one of the bedrooms after getting drunk and passing out. The following morning, Del drives Albert back home to north London, but the caravan where he was living with Del's cousins Stan (Mike Kemp) and Jean (Maureen Sweeney) has been moved. Del suggests that he find a room at the Seamen's Mission. Del also tells Rodney that he does not know how to grieve for Grandad and is hiding his pain. Later, at The Nag's Head, Albert turns up and lies to the boys saying the mission is no longer there. Del falls for the deception, and suggests that he come home with them.
26	"Hole in One"	Ray Butt	Susan Belbin	29:37	7 March 1985	13.4
During the middle of an extremely cold winter, Rodney has invested the last of the Trotters' money in £500 of suntan lotion. To make things worse, the deep-fat fryer that they sold to Mike, landlord of The Nag's Head, is malfunctioning and the tension brings Del and Rodney to boiling point. Throughout all of this trouble, however, Uncle Albert, whom Rodney blames for their bad luck, keeps telling them that something will turn up. As Albert leaves the pub, he deliberately falls through an open cellar door, and the Trotters quickly come up with a way to get some money by suing the brewery for damages. The case reaches court and it transpires that Albert has at least fifteen previous lawsuits for falling down pub cellars dating back to the 1940s. The case is thrown out and Albert reveals he was trying to get some money to repay Del and Rodney for housing him, and to pay for Grandad's headstone.
27	"It's Only Rock and Roll"	Ray Butt	Susan Belbin	28:29	14 March 1985	13.6
Rodney joins a band, and Del immediately capitalises on this by booking them into The Shamrock Club to play for the St Patrick's night festivities. Taking his place as the band's manager, Del winces his way through their rehearsals, and, when the Shamrock gig results in a fight, the band are forced to flee. Later, when Rodney finds out that the musical equipment has vanished, he contacts the police. When Del sees Rodney with the constable, he explains that the instruments had been on a "sale or return" basis, and had been returned. Rodney's dreams of fame have been crushed and he confronts Del when he sees the group performing their old hit single on Top of the Pops, and realises that, without Del's interference, he might have made it to number one.
28	"Sleeping Dogs Lie"	Ray Butt	Susan Belbin	29:58	21 March 1985	15.75
In an attempt to earn an easy £60 a week, Del persuades Boycie and Marlene to entrust him with the care of their Great Dane puppy, Duke, while they are on holiday. While out for a walk, Rodney notices that Duke appears to be unresponsive, and they decide to take him to the vet (John D. Collins). Del and Rodney think that Duke may have eaten some reheated pork leftovers for breakfast, and the vet quickly informs them that Duke has probably contracted salmonella poisoning. Needing the remaining pork for testing, Del phones Albert and discovers that he has eaten it, so they tell him to go to hospital. When Albert gets discharged from hospital a few days later with a clean bill of health, Del Boy discovers that Rodney has been giving Albert's sleeping pills to Duke, and the dog's vitamin supplements to Albert.
29	"Watching the Girls Go By"	Ray Butt	Susan Belbin	29:50	28 March 1985	14.45
Rodney is taking some stick from the lads down the pub about his "imaginary" girlfriend, and Mickey Pearce bets him "fifty" that he will not bring a girl to the Saturday night party in The Nag's Head. When Rodney admits to Del that he does not have a date for Saturday night, his big brother sets about trying to get him one. On the Friday night, the two brothers head out clubbing, and, despite trying almost every club in London, they end up in a seedy little bar in search of a date for Rodney. As luck would have it, Del Boy spots Yvonne (Carolyn Allen), an old flame who he knows is not too picky with whom she goes out, and he offers to pay her part of the winnings from Rodney's bet if she will escort his little brother the following night. Apparently, the date goes well until halfway through the evening when Yvonne takes centre stage in the pub and begins her act as a stripper – in front of all of Rodney's mates. Del Boy tries to console Rodney with the thought of his £50 winnings, but it turns out the bet was for fifty pence.
30	"As One Door Closes"	Ray Butt	Susan Belbin	29:48	4 April 1985	14.15
Del agrees to provide painter and decorator Brendan O'Shaughnessy with enough louvred doors to refit an entire housing estate in Nunhead. Del's supplier, Teddy Cummings, only supplies in bulk, so it is up to the Trotters to find £2,000 by the next day or there is no chance of getting the doors. As usual, a solution turns up in the form of Denzil's redundancy money, which Del somehow cons him out of, only to be told by Brendan that the doors he has bought are not needed, and, to make things worse, the doors turn out to be stolen. It is not long before Denzil and his five brothers come looking for their money, so, with nowhere else to go, the Trotters visit their mother's grave – a favourite refuge for Del in times of trouble. While there, Rodney notices a rare butterfly from the cover of his magazine, which is worth about £3,000 to collectors. After chasing the butterfly around the churchyard, the park and the boating lake, Rodney finally captures it, only to have it squashed when Del holds it out to show Denzil and gets high-fived.

=== Christmas Special (1985) ===
No.	Title	Produced by	Directed by	Running time	Original release date	UK viewers (millions)
Christmas Special (1985)
31	"To Hull and Back"	Ray Butt	Ray Butt	90 minutes	25 December 1985	16.90
Boycie and Abdul ask Del to smuggle diamonds from Amsterdam into the country. Del initially declines the offer, but ultimately agrees in exchange for £15,000. When Del learns that DCI Roy Slater is aware of the cases of diamond smuggling, but does not know who is involved, and realising that he would not get the diamonds through airport security, Del gets Uncle Albert to take him and Rodney to Amsterdam from Hull in a hired boat. The Trotters arrive at the location and collect the diamonds. Meanwhile, back at the police station, Slater deduces that Boycie, Abdul (Tony Anholt) and Del are involved in the smuggling and waits at the airport for the Trotters to arrive. Del, Rodney and Albert arrive back a day late, because Albert got lost. All seems to have gone well until Slater catches Boycie and the Trotters in the act. However, Slater lets them go and is later arrested when the police work out that he has been working with the man in Amsterdam who keeps the diamonds until the couriers arrive. It transpires that Del has managed to switch two of the diamonds with his cufflinks, and Rodney has picked up Boycie’s money that was on the table. Although Boycie used fake money to pay for the diamonds, he paid Del with real money. Unfortunately, Del thinks the money is fake and throws it out the window.

=== Series 5 (1986) ===
No.	Title	Produced by	Directed by	Running time	Original release date	UK viewers (millions)
Series Five (1986)
32	"From Prussia with Love"	Ray Butt	Mandie Fletcher	30:11	31 August 1986	12.1
It is closing time at The Nag's Head, and Mike the landlord is having problems clearing everyone out, particularly a young pregnant foreign girl who does not seem to speak English. Del and Rodney offer to help, and, despite Del Boy's dodgy French, they work out that Anna (Erika Hoffman) is from Germany, and she has been chucked out on the street and is considering getting her child adopted. They leave Rodney to take Anna to an hotel, but he ends up bringing her back to the flat. After fuming about Rodney bringing another "waif and stray" home, Del Boy considers what can be done with Anna's unwanted baby – and the first thing he thinks of is how to exploit her and make money. For years, Marlene and Boycie have been trying for a child, with no success, and now for £3,000, Del is offering them the chance to have their very own baby boy. The stress is clearly getting to Anna, and she begins to go into labour. Later on, Del, Boycie and Marlene all gather round in the lounge waiting for Anna and Rodney to return from hospital. All is well until Rodney lets Del Boy know that Anna's baby is a girl, and that the baby's father's parents were originally from the West Indies.
33	"The Miracle of Peckham"	Ray Butt	Mandie Fletcher	29:33	7 September 1986	14.20
Feeling guilty about his criminal lifestyle, Del has a rare religious urge and heads to the confessional of his local Catholic church to speak with Fr O'Keith (P.G. Stephens). While chatting with the priest, Del discovers that the local hospice, St Mary's, requires a £185,000 renovation or it will soon close. As the hospice cared for Del and Rodney's mother and grandad, Del takes the charitable cause to his heart. After his confession, Del is about to put some money into the collection box when Fr O'Keith cries out that the statue of the Virgin Mary is weeping holy tears. Within a couple of seconds, Del has persuaded the priest that this miracle needs publicising – something that could go a long way towards raising funds for St Mary's renovations and lining Del's pockets. Fr O'Keith reluctantly agrees, and Del gets Rodney to alert the national press. As journalists arrive from all over the world, Del helps Fr O'Keith collect the contributions from all those that wish to witness the miracle of the weeping virgin. It is only when the priest notices rain dripping from the roof of the church that Del Boy's elaborate con is exposed.
34	"The Longest Night"	Ray Butt	Mandie Fletcher	28:08	14 September 1986	16.65
During a shopping trip at Top Buy supermarket, the Trotters are apprehended by a security guard on suspicion of shoplifting. Things get worse when they are taken to the manager Mr. Peterson (Max Harvey)'s office and realise that they have lost their receipt for the goods. Shortly after, Tom Clarke (John Bardon) the security guard brings a cocky shoplifter, Lennox Gilbey (Vas Blackwood), into the manager's office where he promptly holds everyone at gunpoint and demands the money from the safe. Unluckily for Lennox, the safe is on a time-lock, and, owing to the unreliable watch he is wearing, he is 15 minutes later than planned and the safe will not unlock until 8 am the next day. After being held hostage throughout the night, Del realises that he sold the watch to Lennox's mother, and that he also knew him as a child. Del tells Lennox to walk away from the robbery, but Lennox reveals that he, the manager and security guard had planned to split the £60,000 in the safe but needed the Trotters as independent witnesses. The trio beg Del not to go to the police; instead, he arranges for Lennox to get a job as a security guard at the supermarket after Tom's retirement, and then makes sure he wins a £1,000 prize as the millionth customer in the store.
35	"Tea for Three"	Ray Butt	Mandie Fletcher	30:42	21 September 1986	16.50
Trigger's young niece, Lisa (Gerry Cowper), is staying with him for a while, and the young girl that Del and Rodney remember has now become a 25-year-old woman. Both Trotter brothers think they are in with a chance, despite Del being clearly too old, and immediately begin competing for Lisa's affections. Del and Rodney manage to invite Lisa to the flat for tea, and she seems more than happy to accept. Del goes out to get some more "Smash", and Rodney spends half an hour on the sunbed. Just before Del leaves for the shops, he notices Rodney has dozed off and spitefully turns up the timer on the bed to two and a half hours. Much to Rodney's annoyance, he spends most of the evening nursing his burnt face, while Del and Lisa seem to be getting on really well. Rodney arranges a surprise for Del, as, during the meal, Del lies to Lisa boasting that he used to be in the Parachute Regiment. Del and Rodney head off to meet Lisa's friends for a spot of hang gliding. Not wanting to lose face, Del reluctantly agrees to try it, and, after launching himself into the air, he disappears for more than twelve hours. Once back, Del lies to Rodney pretending to be unable to walk, but Rodney sees through the deception, much to Del's annoyance. Lisa turns out to be engaged, and so all of Del and Rodney's efforts were a waste of time.
36	"Video Nasty"	Ray Butt	Ray Butt	29:00	28 September 1986	17.50
Rodney's art class is given a £10,000 grant to make a film spotlighting the local community, but first he has to avoid the scheming intentions of Del Boy. While Rodney suffers from writer's block, Del provides him with, There's a Rhino Loose in the City, a ridiculous tale of a killer rhinoceros escaping from London Zoo and laying waste to innocent victims. Rodney immediately points out the flaws in the logic behind the plot, and Del leaves him to it. Without telling Rodney, Del has already arranged for Mickey to head down to the town hall to film different couples' weddings at £50 a time – and he has also managed to con half the neighbourhood to pay £10 for the opportunity of becoming a movie extra. To make things worse, Mickey arranges for a woman called Amanda to visit the Trotters' flat in a nurse's uniform and begin filming a blue movie called Night Nurse, which is due for its premiere in the back room of The Nag's Head. Once again, Del ruins things for Rodney.
37	"Who Wants to Be a Millionaire?"	Ray Butt	Ray Butt	29:59	5 October 1986	18.80
Del's old business partner from the 1960s, Jumbo Mills (Nick Stringer), returns to the UK to strike a deal with Boycie, and ends up rubbing everyone up the wrong way in The Nag's Head. Jumbo has made himself rich after leaving rainy London for Australia with Del Boy's last £200. In an attempt to pay back this debt "with interest", Jumbo asks Del to become the new face of his new import business – but it means a move to Australia for the Trotter family. After making sure Rodney and Albert have a home in Australia, Del Boy agrees to join Jumbo's firm, but things do not go as smoothly as that. Albert decides he wants to stay in Peckham, and Rodney's criminal record denies him an immigration visa. Regardless of this, Del seems keen still to go, but, when he picks up the phone to confirm the plan to Jumbo, he turns him down – reluctantly admitting that his family ties are stronger.

=== Christmas Specials (1986-1988) ===
No.	Title	Produced by	Directed by	Running time	Original release date	UK viewers (millions)
Christmas Special (1986)
38	"A Royal Flush"	Ray Butt	Ray Butt	76 minutes	25 December 1986	18.75
Rodney meets Vicky (Sarah Duncan), a seemingly impoverished artist who it transpires is the daughter of the Duke of Maylebury (Jack Hedley). Having obtained a pair of tickets to the sold-out production of Carmen, Rodney seems to have deeply impressed Vicky. She is less taken by the presence of Del and his peroxide blonde girlfriend, June Snell (Diane Langton), at the opera when they ruin the night for Rodney and the other attendees. Vicky then invites Rodney to a party at the Duke's country home, and it seems romance may be imminent. However, Del Boy turns up uninvited, gets drunk and offends the other members of Vicky's family.
Christmas Special (1987)
39	"The Frog's Legacy"	Ray Butt	Ray Butt	60 minutes	25 December 1987	14.50
Trotters Independent Traders is causing mayhem with their faulty RAJAH computers. Rodney gets a new job at a funeral director's, while Albert and Del con the public with their miracle cure body massagers. At the wedding of Trigger's niece, Del hears the tale of Freddy the Frog, a bank robber and close friend of the boys' mother. He left everything in his will to their mum, including the stolen gold bullion. While Del hunts for treasure, Rodney puzzles over Freddy and his mother's "friendship" – and a son who would by now be his own age.
Christmas Special (1988)
40	"Dates"	Gareth Gwenlan	Tony Dow	80 minutes	25 December 1988	16.6
Surprised by Trigger's success with a new computer dating agency, Del joins and meets aspiring actress Raquel Turner and the two quickly become close. However, Raquel is not aware that Del is a market trader, as he claimed to be the manager of his own import–export business using the name "Derek Duvall". Meanwhile, Rodney has a date with Nag's Head barmaid "Nervous Nerys", which ends in disaster after Rodney jumps a red light in the van and causes a police car to crash, having been convinced by Mickey and Jevon that Nerys enjoys the company of macho men. A few days later, Uncle Albert's birthday party is held at The Nag's Head, but Del is horrified when the surprise stripper he booked turns out to be Raquel. The pair eventually make it up and Raquel reveals that she has been offered an acting role in a tour around the Middle East. Del is about to go to her flat and ask her to stay, but blows his chance when he is arrested after ripping a policewoman's blouse open, believing that she is a stripper booked by Uncle Albert in revenge for his birthday party.

=== Series 6 (1989) ===
No.	Title	Produced by	Directed by	Running time	Original release date	UK viewers (millions)
Series Six (1989)
41	"Yuppy Love"	Gareth Gwenlan	Tony Dow	49:02	8 January 1989	13.9
Del has repeatedly been watching the film Wall Street and decided that the upwardly mobile lifestyle is for him. The camel-hair coat is out, and in comes a smart new image: green Mackintosh, mobile phone, Filofax and aluminium briefcase – but the yellow van remains. Del even wants to buy the flat off the council and sell it for a quick profit. Rodney, meanwhile, has decided to complete a computing diploma course at the adult education centre. It is there that he meets a young woman called Cassandra, who returns his raincoat to him when he mistakes hers for his, Del having written Rodney's name inside the collar. Del and Trigger ditch The Nag's Head in favour of propping up a wine bar. As Del accidentally falls through the bar hatch, Rodney and the boys head to a club, where Rodney amazes the others by dancing with Cassandra. She gives him a lift home, but he pretends to live in a big house in the posh King's Avenue. As they say goodbye, he is caught waving to the unknown occupants of the posh house. As he walks home, a rainstorm starts and he discovers he has taken Cassandra's coat again.
42	"Danger UXD"	Gareth Gwenlan	Tony Dow	48:12	15 January 1989	16.1
Del continues to pursue the yuppy lifestyle, and insists that Rodney also wear a suit. He convinces his young brother that it will help him sell fifty video recorders that he got from Ronnie Nelson at the Advanced Electronics Research and Development Centre. Ever the opportunist, Del helps Denzil by taking fifty dolls off his hands. Unfortunately, the Trotters discover too late that they are inflatable sex dolls filled with explosive propane. Del tries in vain to get rid of the dolls, but sex shop manager Dirty Barry (Walter Sparrow) will not take them, and they eventually resort to dressing two of them in their mother's clothes and taking them for a drive. Denzil soon finds out about the dolls' explosive properties and rushes to warn Del, who is unaware. Eventually, after being ditched, the dressed-up dolls explode, making Del and Rodney flee.
43	"Chain Gang"	Gareth Gwenlan	Tony Dow	49:51	22 January 1989	16.3
After Del meets Cassandra for the first time at the One-Eleven Club, he and Rodney do a deal with retired jeweller Arnie (Philip McGough) to buy 250 gold chains for £12,500. Arnie explains that he is selling them for half their retail price because his previous agreed buyer, Mr Stavros, has not yet paid him. Del forms a consortium of Rodney, Albert, Mike, Trigger and Boycie, who contribute varying amounts of money, to pay for the chains. After selling the chains, Arnie is told that Mr Stavros has made contact and now wishes to purchase the chains for the original price of £25,000. The consortium decides to have Arnie sell the chains to Stavros on their behalf. However, while waiting for Stavros at a restaurant, Arnie suddenly has a heart attack and is rushed to hospital. They are later told that Arnie has died and, with none of his personal details, they cannot recover the chains or their money. A few days later, Rodney sees Arnie faking another heart attack and the consortium realise he is a conman. The boys are able to track Arnie down after learning that Denzil and his two brothers have also been conned by Arnie.
44	"The Unlucky Winner Is..."	Gareth Gwenlan	Tony Dow	49:50	29 January 1989	17
Del has entered every competition on the market, trying to win as many prizes as possible. Del has entered one of Rodney's childhood paintings in an art competition, and they win a holiday in Mallorca. It is only when they arrive at Mallorca airport that Del explains that Rodney's painting won in the under-15 category, and Del told the organisers he was Rodney's father, with Cassandra forced to pose as his stepmother. While Del enjoys himself, Rodney has to endure a miserable time in the activities with the other children and cannot spend time with Cassandra. In order to placate them, Del buys them all Spanish lottery tickets and Rodney's ticket wins the one million peseta draw. However, because Del had doctored Rodney's student card as well as his passport to make him appear underage, they are unable to claim the prize.
45	"Sickness and Wealth"	Gareth Gwenlan	Tony Dow	56:43	5 February 1989	18.2
Del is suffering from a mysterious stomach illness, and poor sales of his summer dresses due to the cold weather means he has been unable to pay the rent on the flat for three months. The solution presents itself in the shape of Uncle Albert's lady-friend Elsie Partridge (Constance Chapman), a medium. Del dismisses it as nonsense but sets up a séance room in The Nag's Head to cash in and con more unsuspecting members of the public. Albert, worried for Del's health, tells Elsie to say that his mum has contacted her asking him to go to the doctor. When Marlene falls pregnant, just as Elsie foresaw, Del takes heed and is eventually diagnosed with irritable bowel syndrome due to his stressful, unhealthy lifestyle. Just as Del appears to be recovering, Rodney shocks him by announcing he is engaged to Cassandra.
46	"Little Problems"	Gareth Gwenlan	Tony Dow	49:49	12 February 1989	18.9
With his wedding to Cassandra approaching, Rodney is downbeat as he believes he has failed his computer diploma course, potentially costing him a job with Cassandra's father, and he cannot afford his share of the deposit for his and Cassandra's new flat. However, Del later presents Rodney with his diploma, claiming his tutor had been delayed (though revealing to Albert that he paid the tutor £150 to award it). Del also reveals that he is giving Rodney £2,000 as a wedding present for the deposit on his flat. However, that £2,000 is also money that Del owes the fearsome Driscoll Brothers, who want paying. Del cons Boycie into paying for some faulty video recorders which will cover the Trotters' debts. Despite taking a battering from the Driscoll Brothers (Roy Marsden and Christopher Ryan), Del still manages to give Rodney his money and serve as best man at the wedding. At the reception, after Rodney and Cassandra leave for their honeymoon, Del reflects on his and Rodney's new lives.

=== Christmas Specials (1989-1990) ===
No.	Title	Produced by	Directed by	Running time	Original release date	UK viewers (millions)
Christmas Special (1989)
47	"The Jolly Boys' Outing"	Gareth Gwenlan	Tony Dow	85 minutes	25 December 1989	20.12
Cassandra organises a dinner party, inviting her "yuppie" boss, Steven (Daniel Hill), and his wife in the hope of getting a promotion, but Del and Uncle Albert also arrive and put those plans in jeopardy. Despite it being Rodney and Cassandra's first wedding anniversary, Rodney agrees to go on the annual "Jolly Boys' Outing" to Margate. During the chaotic trip, Rodney is arrested for hitting a policeman with a football, Harry (Roy Evans) the coach driver is incapacitated by fumes, and the radio supplied by Del ignites the fuel line and blows the coach up. Forced to stay the night in Margate, the Trotters have no choice but to go to a gloomy bed and breakfast. Rodney is still concerned that Cassandra's boss is staying with her while he is away, and so he and Del go out for a drink at a club, where Del encounters his lost love Raquel, now working as an assistant to The Great Raymondo (Robin Driscoll). Del and Raquel reunite, but when he returns to his flat Rodney discovers Cassandra and Stephen seemingly alone together. Rodney punches Steven in the face, but Stephen's wife is also there, and Cassandra throws Rodney out.
Christmas Special (1990)
48	"Rodney Come Home"	Gareth Gwenlan	Tony Dow	75 minutes	25 December 1990	17.97
Rodney is now working at his father-in-law's printing firm, but his marriage to Cassandra is faltering. Rodney's first proper job also provides Del with cheap printing – his sole source of income. Raquel has returned from a trip to America and is now living with Del. Del is worried about his brother's marriage, as Rodney resents Cassandra for working all the time and not cooking for him. Del's attempts to save Rodney's marriage result in Rodney being thrown out again.

=== Series 7 (1990–1991) ===
No.	Title	Produced by	Directed by	Running time	Original release date	UK viewers (millions)
Series Seven (1990-91)
49	"The Sky's the Limit"	Gareth Gwenlan	Tony Dow	49:57	30 December 1990	15
Raquel has moved in with Del, as has the newly separated Rodney. Rodney is drinking too much and not going to work. While Cassandra and her mother travel to Spain for a holiday, Alan Parry, Cassandra's dad and Rodney's boss, visits Del Boy and confides that he was hoping to leave his business to the couple when he retired. They hatch a plot to arrange a reconciliation for the couple. Rodney pays £250 for a hotel room and waits for Cassandra to arrive at Gatwick Airport. However, when Cassandra's flight lands in Manchester, he is furious. When he learns the real reason behind her flight being diverted, Del has some serious explaining to do.
50	"The Chance of a Lunchtime"	Gareth Gwenlan	Tony Dow	49:30	6 January 1991	16.6
Raquel wants to revive her theatrical passions, and auditions for As You Like It. Del volunteers to help her rehearse. Rodney and Cassandra meet for a meal, both thinking that the other made the first move, without realising that Del has set them up. Things seem to be going well until Rodney staggers out of The Nag's Head with Del's ex-fiancée Trudy to see her to a cab, just as Cassandra drives past and leaps to the wrong conclusion. Rodney resigns from his job. Raquel tells Del that she will not be taking the part in the play, as she is pregnant.
51	"Stage Fright"	Gareth Gwenlan	Tony Dow	49:34	13 January 1991	16.6
Del meets his old pal Eric (Trevor Byfield), who runs a club called the "Starlight Rooms". He pays Del £600 to supply entertainment for an upcoming birthday party to be held at the club. Del pairs a pregnant Raquel with Trigger's colleague Tony Angelino (Philip Pope) to sing and appoints Rodney, who is now unemployed and struggling to find his own accommodation, as his road manager. Del then learns from Boycie and Mike that the Starlight Rooms is now owned by local villain Eugene McCarthy (Roger Blake), and that the party is for McCarthy's mother. While Tony and Raquel are singing "Crying", it is revealed that Tony is unable to pronounce his "Rs" correctly. Worried, Del Boy returns to the flat, thinking that McCarthy will be after him. To Del's relief, it turns out that Mrs McCarthy found Tony's singing hysterical and Eugene wants to book the pair for a further five weeks.
52	"The Class of '62"	Gareth Gwenlan	Tony Dow	49:16	20 January 1991	16.2
Del and his friends are horrified to discover that their surprise school reunion has been arranged by Roy Slater, who is back in Peckham having been paroled from Parkhurst six months earlier following the diamond smuggling caper a few years before. Del is even more horrified to learn that Slater is Raquel's estranged husband. Del is forced to keep Slater sweet or risk the secret of the identity of Raquel's husband being revealed. Del, Rodney and Albert soon learn that Slater is due to receive a windfall from more illegal diamonds: a fact that the police and Raquel are unaware of. Del uses this to blackmail Slater into leaving Peckham and finalise his divorce with Raquel. Ironically, shortly after Slater leaves, Del reveals that Slater was at no real risk of being caught, because Slater was the only one who held any evidence of his involvement with further diamond smuggling.
53	"He Ain't Heavy, He's My Uncle"	Gareth Gwenlan	Tony Dow	48:41	27 January 1991	17.2
To improve Rodney's financial situation, Del employs him as his new "Director of Commercial Development", which actually involves cleaning the battered old Ford Capri that Del has recently purchased from Boycie. Del, meanwhile, is arranging to buy their flat in Nelson Mandela House. Uncle Albert is going to the over-sixties club on the estate and is chatting up Marlene's mother, Dora (Joan Gery). One night, he returns to the flat bruised and shaken, telling Del and Rodney he has been mugged. Despite being home, something is not right; Uncle Albert then disappears. After a lot of driving around, the boys find him, but a visit from Albert's dominoes opponent "Knock Knock" (Howard Goorney) reveals the truth about the black eye.
54	"Three Men, a Woman and a Baby"	Gareth Gwenlan	Tony Dow	49:08	3 February 1991	18.9
Del is horrified when he learns that the wigs that he has bought to sell to some "old tarts" at The Nag's Head turn out to be men's wigs. Cassandra gives Rodney the push for lacking ambition and not being part of the marriage. Rodney has also turned vegetarian, much to the mockery of the rest of the Trotter clan. When Cassandra asks him to visit, he tries to impress her by wearing a clip-on ponytail (one of Del's wigs), but he discreetly discards it when Cassandra jokes about how silly they are. Rodney impresses Cassandra by disposing of a "rat" (actually the ponytail) in the apartment, and they get back together. Their night is interrupted by a phone call from Del telling them that Raquel has gone into labour. She gives birth to a boy in the early hours of the morning, whom she and Del name Damien.

=== Christmas Specials (1991–1993) ===
No.	Title	Produced by	Directed by	Running time	Original release date	UK viewers (millions)
Christmas Specials (1991)
55	"Miami Twice - The American Dream"	Gareth Gwenlan	Gareth Gwenlan	50 minutes	24 December 1991	17.70
At Damien's christening, Del secures a deal with the vicar (Treva Etienne) to sell "pre-blessed" Communion wine around the country. Rodney is living with Del and Albert on weekdays, and with Cassandra at weekends, on the advice of their marriage guidance counsellor. Del uses Rodney's pension money and buys a holiday to Miami with it; he then tricks Rodney into going on holiday with him, knowing that Cassandra's work commitments will prevent her from attending.
56	"Miami Twice - Oh to Be in England"	Gareth Gwenlan	Tony Dow	95 minutes	25 December 1991	14.9
When Del and Rodney arrive in Miami, the family of Mafia boss Vincenzo Ochetti (David Jason) are drawn to Del, who bears a striking resemblance to the Don and who is facing life imprisonment at an upcoming trial. They come up with a plan to kill Del so that Don Ochetti can escape. Soon realising they are not simply being shown American hospitality, Del and Rodney flee, aided by the Boyces, who are also on holiday in Miami. Upon a safe return to Peckham, they find dozens of crates of wine, which were deemed unfit for Holy Communion.
Christmas Special (1992)
57	"Mother Nature's Son"	Gareth Gwenlan	Tony Dow	65 minutes	25 December 1992	20.13
Del's purchase of the flat has finally come through unexpectedly, and he has also been ordered to remove a public health hazard from Grandad's old allotment. The hazard turns out to be drums of a mysterious yellow substance, and Del hires Trigger and Denzil to help him dispose of it. After learning about a man called Myles (Robert Glenister), who runs his own organic shop and has become a millionaire within two years, Del tricks him into believing that there is a natural spring at the allotment. When the water passes the relevant tests, Del sells water from his kitchen tap as bottled water called Peckham Spring. The scheme is a success and makes the Trotters lots of money, so they go for a break at the Grand Hotel in Brighton. While they are in Brighton, a news report explains that Peckham's water supply has been contaminated by the substances that Denzil and Trigger dumped in "a pond". As Del falls asleep, a bottle of Peckham Spring on his bedside table glows yellow.
Christmas Special (1993)
58	"Fatal Extraction"	Gareth Gwenlan	Tony Dow	85 minutes	25 December 1993	19.59
Raquel is frustrated with Del, who is frequently staying out late at casinos. Rodney raises the problem with Del, who explains he is brokering a deal to get hold of some Russian ex-military camcorders. Rodney and Cassandra have decided to try to have a baby. When Del comes home at 8:15 am, stopping only to change his clothes, Raquel leaves him. Del organises a date with Beverley (Mel Martin), his dentist's receptionist; however, he cancels it after much persistence from Rodney and Uncle Albert. A changed man, he invites Raquel back. While celebrating, he drunkenly starts a riot on the estate. All seems calm, but Beverley seems to be stalking Del.

=== Christmas Specials (1996) ===
No.	Title	Produced by	Directed by	Running time	Original release date	UK viewers (millions)
Christmas Trilogy (1996)
59	"Heroes and Villains"	Gareth Gwenlan	Tony Dow	60 minutes	25 December 1996	21.31
Rodney has a nightmare in which an adult Damien rules the country in a dystopian future. Del is in a bad mood because business is going badly and his home improvement grant from the council has been rejected. Meanwhile, Raquel's estranged parents make contact with her, and she and Damien spend a weekend with them, and Cassandra goes on holiday to Spain with her parents. Left to their own devices, Del and Rodney attend a fancy-dress party arranged by one of Mike's fellow publicans. Their van breaks down and they are forced to run to the party dressed as Batman and Robin. Along the way, they inadvertently scare off a gang of muggers attempting to rob Councillor Murray (Angela Bruce) (who had rejected Del's application for the grant). When they arrive at the party, however, the Trotters discover that the party's host died the day before and the party has been cancelled and replaced with the host's wake. A few days later, Del and Rodney stop the same gang of muggers, resulting in Del Boy receiving a medal and a £5,000 home improvement grant from Councillor Murray. Rodney and Cassandra also reveal that Cassandra is pregnant.
60	"Modern Men"	Gareth Gwenlan	Tony Dow	60 minutes	27 December 1996	21.33
Del is reading a book called Modern Man. Despite being convinced that he is the dictionary definition of debonair masculinity, the book is making him behave irrationally, which concerns Rodney. With Rodney also due to become a father, he wants more responsibility and a better job to provide for his family. He unwittingly answers a job advertisement, posted by Del to alleviate Rodney's workload. Del, meanwhile, has decided to take his manhood into his own hands and get a vasectomy. Del is also being pursued by Dr. Singh (Bhasker Patel) regarding faulty paint Del sold him, and a nightmare Del has where Dr. Singh performs his vasectomy makes Del decide against it. Cassandra is rushed to hospital after suffering a miscarriage. Rodney feels helpless, but Del tells him that he has to be strong for his wife. Del then breaks down, as Rodney supports his wife.
61	"Time on Our Hands"	Gareth Gwenlan	Tony Dow	60 minutes	29 December 1996	24.35
Rodney is bottling up his emotions following the loss of his baby. Del, realising that Cassandra needs his support, wants to help Rodney grieve. Raquel's parents arrive for a meal and to meet Del for the first time. He does little to impress, and Uncle Albert ruins the meal by mixing up the coffee and gravy. The next day, Raquel's father James (Michael Jayston) meets Rodney and Del as they clear their garage. Being an antiques dealer, he spots a long-lost 18th century marine timekeeper by John Harrison, which he recommends getting valued. The watch is sold at Sotheby's for £6.2 million, finally making the Trotters millionaires. This episode originally served as the series finale and conclusion to Only Fools and Horses.

=== Christmas Specials (2001-2003) ===
No.	Title	Produced by	Directed by	Running time	Original release date	UK viewers (millions)
Christmas Special (2001)
62	"If They Could See Us Now"	Gareth Gwenlan	Tony Dow	71 minutes	25 December 2001	21.35
Del and Rodney lose their fortunes following the collapse of the Central American market. With no other option, they return to their flat at Nelson Mandela House in Peckham. Del is convicted of more than 20 years of tax evasion and ordered to repay nearly £49,000 to the Inland Revenue within a year. A few days later, Uncle Albert dies and the Trotters end up attending the wrong funeral. Cassandra and Rodney are finding that their love life is a little flat, and so they spice it up by role-playing their fantasies. Cassandra becomes Rodney's policewoman, but Rodney struggles to resemble Russell Crowe from Gladiator. In an attempt to win the required money, Del appears on the Who Wants to Be a Millionaire? inspired gameshow Goldrush hosted by Jonathan Ross, but is eliminated after a correct answer Rodney gives him to a question is not accepted. Back at the flat, Del receives a call from the producers admitting their mistake and inviting him back on to the show with his prize money reinstated, but believing it is another prank call from Mickey Pearce, he tells them to donate the money to charity.
Christmas Special (2002)
63	"Strangers on the Shore"	Gareth Gwenlan	Tony Dow	75 minutes	25 December 2002	17.40
Del and Rodney represent Albert at a naval reunion in France. Upon their arrival at the village, they learn that Uncle Albert was hounded out of the country by the French Resistance owing to his promiscuity. Del and Rodney notice all the villagers seem to have mariners' beards. Del, Trigger and Denzil arrange to smuggle duty-free alcohol into the country using Denzil's empty lorry. When they get home, they discover an illegal immigrant (Nabil Elouahabi) has seemingly been stowed away behind the crates. Introducing him to the family as "Gary", they house him, only for him to eventually escape. Subsequently, when Boycie travels to France to sign an important business contract, they discover that "Gary" is the businessman's son, and the Trotters and Boycie are arrested for kidnap.
Christmas Special (2003)
64	"Sleepless in Peckham"	Gareth Gwenlan	Tony Dow	75 minutes	25 December 2003	16.37
With only two weeks left to repay the Inland Revenue, it looks as if the Trotters will be evicted from their flat. Rodney finds a photo of the first "Jolly Boys' Outing" from 1960 and finally discovers that his biological father is Freddie Robdal ("Freddie the Frog"). Meanwhile, Marlene has disappeared and everyone is convinced that Boycie has murdered her. With only a few days left before their eviction, Del and Rodney visit Albert's solicitor and, following a reading of his will, discover that Albert has left his share of the Trotters' fortune to them, saving them from eviction. Rodney also finally becomes a father after Cassandra gives birth to a daughter, whom he names Joan in memory of his late mother.

== Other ==
=== Short specials ===
Title	Produced by	Directed by	Running time	Original release date	UK viewers (millions)
"Christmas Trees"	Ray Butt	Ray Butt	8 mins	27 December 1982	7.2
Del tries to sell Christmas trees at the local market. This was a comedy sketch produced for the 1982 Christmas show The Funny Side of Christmas, presented by Frank Muir, which also featured sketches from other comedies.
"Harty"	Jon Plowman	Ron Isted	6 mins	21 December 1983	N/A
A short sketch featuring Del, Rodney and Grandad featured in a Christmas edition of Russell Harty's chat show.
"Licensed to Drill"	Malcolm Taylor	Malcolm Taylor	19 mins	1984	TBD
Educational episode made in 1984 and shown in only schools and colleges. Del, Rodney and Grandad discuss oil drilling and fossil fuels. It is notable as the last appearance of Lennard Pearce as Grandad.
"White Mice"	Ray Butt	Ray Butt	3 mins	24 December 1985	N/A
In a spoof documentary, Del is investigated by a BBC consumer expert. Shown on BBC Breakfast Time in 1985.
"Royal Variety Show"	Ray Butt	Ray Butt	5 mins	29 November 1986	N/A
While delivering some dodgy goods, Del, Rodney and Uncle Albert inadvertently walk into the Royal Variety Performance.
"The Robin Flies at Dawn"	Gareth Gwenlan	Tony Dow	5 mins	1 December 1990	N/A
Del, Rodney and Uncle Albert deliver a goodwill message to British personnel serving in the 1990–91 Gulf War.
"Only Fools Cutaway" Comic Relief Special	Gareth Gwenlan	Tony Dow	6 mins	14 March 1997	10.6
A short scene, based entirely in the flat, featuring a young Damien Trotter. The first half features Del and Rodney slipping in references to other TV shows featuring David Jason and Nicholas Lyndhurst (e.g., A Touch of Frost and Goodnight Sweetheart) before the duo come out of character and make an appeal to camera for donations for Comic Relief. This is Buster Merryfield's last appearance as Uncle Albert.
"Beckham in Peckham" Sport Relief Special	Clyde Holcroft	Tony Dow	10 mins	21 March 2014	9.53
David Jason and Nicholas Lyndhurst return for the 2014 Sport Relief special after 11 years. The sketch sees David Beckham head to Peckham to join Del Boy and Rodney in a greasy spoon café. They attempt to sell Beckham's underpants. Dedicated to John Sullivan and Roger Lloyd-Pack.
"Only Fools and Football (Euro 2020 Message from Del Boy)"	N/A	N/A	2 mins	7 July 2021	N/A
Released on Twitter, YouTube and Facebook, David Jason reprises his role as Del Boy to wish the England national team good luck in their final two games of Euro 2020.

=== Cameo appearances ===
David Jason appeared in adverts for Abbey National, Rover and Radio Times as Del Boy. Jason made a cameo appearance on the 2021 Christmas special of Strictly Come Dancing, wishing Jay Blades well after he danced to the show's theme tune. Jason also made a cameo as the voice of an animated Del Boy on a 2023 edition of The Apprentice. In March 2024, Jason appeared in the role of Del Boy in an episode of Car SOS.

John Challis made appearances as Boycie in a few adverts for UK Gold and an advert for Del's autobiography. He also appeared in a music video for "Del Boy's Tune".

=== Documentaries ===
Title	Original release date
"Only Fools and Horses: Selection Box"	31 December 1996
A selection of best-loved clips from the show chosen by celebrity fans and hosted by John Challis as Boycie. "Selection Box" has been released on BBC Video, but has never been released on DVD. (28 minutes)
"The Story of Only Fools and Horses"	20 December 2002
Behind-the-scenes documentary featuring cast and crew interviews. (76 minutes)
"Britain's Best Sitcom: Only Fools and Horses"	28 February 2004
Behind-the-scenes documentary finding Britain's most loved comedy; the winner was Only Fools and Horses. (60 minutes)
"Only Fools and Horses: The Favourites"	2015
David Jason presents a countdown of the top 20 Only Fools and Horses episodes as voted for by the viewers to celebrate the nation's favourite comedy.
"The Story of... Only Fools and Horses"	29 August 2017 – 3 October 2017
The new documentary series features rare and unseen footage from the Trotter archives and specially re-created moments from Del Boy's family and friends. Gold explores every aspect of Britain's most loved sitcom, with exclusive access to the key cast members, including David Jason and Nicholas Lyndhurst, the series gives rare insights into the show and what went on both on and off camera. The programme reunites cast members, rebuilds some of the sets, and features rare and previously unseen material. (6 x 60 minute episodes)

== Ratings ==
Only Fools and Horses : UK viewers per episode (millions)

Series	Episode number							Average
Series	1	2	3	4	5	6	7	Average
1	9.2	6.1	7.3	7.8	7.0	8.8	–	7.7
2	7.7	10.1	7.5	8.6	8.2	9.5	10.2	8.8
3	9.4	9.7	9.7	10.6	10.7	11.2	11.9	10.5
4	15.2	14.9	13.4	13.6	18.7	14.4	14.2	14.9
5	12.1	14.2	16.7	16.5	17.5	18.8	–	16.0
6	13.9	16.1	16.3	17.0	18.2	18.9	–	16.7
7	15.0	16.6	16.6	16.2	17.2	18.9	–	16.8

Audience measurement performed by Broadcasters' Audience Research Board
