= If It Had Happened Otherwise =

1931 collection of counterfactual history essays

- Editor: J. C. Squire
- Language: English
- Genre: alternate history
- Published: 1931
- Publisher: Longmans, Green
- Publication place: United Kingdom
- ISBN: 028397821X
- Dewey Decimal: 904
- LC Class: D210 .S7

If It Had Happened Otherwise is a 1931 collection of essays edited by J. C. Squire and published by Longmans, Green. Each essay in the collection could be considered alternate history or counterfactual history. Some of the essays were written by leading historians of the period, and one was written by Winston Churchill.

== Essays ==
The original edition included the following essays:

- "If Drouet's Cart Had Stuck" by Hilaire Belloc: In a 1791 point of divergence, the Flight to Varennes is successful and the First Coalition wins the Battle of Valmy, restoring Louis XVI to the French throne as a puppet of the British Empire. France becomes a poor, backward nation, eventually entering World War I, which happens a few years later than in reality and ends with the victory of the still-extant Holy Roman Empire.
- "If Don John of Austria Had Married Mary, Queen of Scots" by G. K. Chesterton
- "If Lee Had NOT Won the Battle of Gettysburg" by Winston Churchill: This essay is written from the viewpoint of a historian in a world where the Confederate Army won the Battle of Gettysburg and the Civil War, and the narrator frequently asks what would have happened if this event had not occurred. The essay is an exercise of counter-counter-factual irony. Although the Confederacy achieves independence, the British Empire becomes a broker between the United States and CSA, resulting in an eventual unification of all three as the "English Speaking Association", which prevents World War I.
- "If Napoleon Had Escaped to America" by H. A. L. Fisher: Napoleon Bonaparte, fleeing from the Battle of Waterloo, avoids surrendering to the British Empire and catches a ship sailing to New York City. The essay is written from the perspective of a New York scholar who becomes a personal assistant of the former Emperor of the French. Napoleon travels south to join Simón Bolívar in liberating most of Central America and South America from Spanish and Portuguese rule.
- "If the Moors in Spain Had Won" by Philip Guedalla: Islamic Granada survives as a separate political entity, weakening Spain from the late 15th century onward, but resulting in a liberal humanist brand of Islam, the adoption of constitutional monarchy, and Spanish participation on the Central Powers' side during World War I against Granada and the Entente Powers.
- "If the General Strike Had Succeeded" by Ronald Knox: This essay is in the form of an article from The Times of 1931, which describes a Great Britain under communist rule.
- "If the Emperor Frederick Had Not Had Cancer" by Emil Ludwig: Kaiser Friedrich III survives past 1888, and with his wife, Empress Victoria, rules a liberal humanist German Empire where their son Kaiser Wilhelm II never succumbs to militarism, due to the long-term benign effects of this scenario, leading to 1914 being a year of peace.
- "If Louis XVI Had Had an Atom of Firmness" by André Maurois: As with Hilaire Belloc's essay above, the main story posits Louis XVI as averting his 1793 death in the French Revolution, but the point of divergence happens in the 1770s rather than 1791, and leads to a more optimistic outcome. In a frame story, a recently deceased historian is escorted by an angel to a great library in Heaven, where he gets to read history books of possible worlds that did not come to be. His eye is caught by a book whose cover states that Louis XVI had a 46-year reign as King of France, dying of a lung disease in 1820. In the main story, the young king, shortly after coming to power in the mid 1770s, makes necessary financial and constitutional reforms beforehand that prevent the necessity for the Revolution, resulting in the survival of France as a constitutional monarchy into the twentieth century. Louis refuses to sponsor the American Revolution and later builds an alliance with Great Britain; the United States never exists, but the Thirteen Colonies get the representation they desired from the British Parliament, so the expanding America effectively controls Britain. The 1790s and 1800s are relatively peaceful decades for Europe, and all nations live happily ever after.
- "If Byron Had Become King of Greece" by Harold Nicolson. The fun-loving poet and playwright recovers from his 1824 illness, becomes chief military strategist in the Greek War of Independence against the Ottoman Empire, and is chosen to be the new nation's first monarch in the 1830s. He is referred to in the story as George I of Greece, a name which in reality was given to a different monarch 30 years later.
- "If It Had Been Discovered in 1930 that Bacon Really Did Write Shakespeare" by J. C. Squire. Not a true alternate history, this is a comic farce wherein cultural upheavals, acts of quick thinking in rebranding tourist attractions, and additions of new slang terms to the English language occur when someone finds a box containing 17th-century documents proving that the plays generally accepted to have been written by William Shakespeare were in fact written by Sir Francis Bacon.
- "If Booth Had Missed Lincoln" by Milton Waldman: Booth's gun fails to fire at Ford's Theatre on April 14, 1865, so he isn't able to kill Lincoln. He is later put in an insane asylum. Lincoln is charged with mismanaging the recently concluded Civil War, and there is repeated friction between Lincoln and a hostile United States Congress. Before Congress can impeach him in 1867, Lincoln dies, discredited and castigated as a spendthrift warmonger. Lincoln's role in this story is similar to that of his successor Andrew Johnson in real history.

== Revised edition ==
A revised edition with the alternate title If: or, History Rewritten was also released by the American Viking Press in 1931, deleting the General Strike essay and adding one new essay along with reprints of two older but previously uncollected ones:

- "If the Dutch Had Kept Nieuw Amsterdam" by Hendrik Willem van Loon.
- "If: A Jacobite Fantasy" by Charles Petrie (1926): Charles Edward Stuart ("Bonnie Prince Charlie") wins the Battle of Culloden in 1745, resulting in George II of Great Britain's exile to his ancestral home in Hanover, Germany. The "Old Pretender" (James Francis Edward Stuart) of the Stuart dynasty is restored to the British throne as "James III of England and VIII of Scotland", but proves conciliatory in terms of religion and government, and is a great patron of arts and entertainment. When "Charlie" succeeds his father as Charles III in 1766, his adroit diplomatic skills prevent the American Revolution through sharing his own dislike for the House of Commons with the American intelligentsia. Henry Benedict Stuart, who in this timeline did not enter the Catholic clergy, but instead married and had an heir, succeeds his childless brother in 1788 as "Henry IX of England and I of Scotland," reigning until his death in 1807. In the 1920s his descendant reigns as "James VI of England and XI of Scotland."
- "If Napoleon Had Won the Battle of Waterloo" by G. M. Trevelyan (1907): Following the titular event, the exhausted, demoralized British Empire becomes a reactionary dictatorship wracked with political instability, and harsh censorship which suppresses much of English Romanticism. France governs much of Europe, and Napoleon eventually dies of natural causes in 1836, by which time he is somewhat senile due to ennui, being ill suited to life in a peaceful world.

== See also ==
Among many other works of alternate-history science fiction:

- Bring the Jubilee (1953) by Ward Moore is one of the earliest popular novels of a world in which the Confederacy was successful in the American Civil War.
- The Man in the High Castle (1962) by Philip K. Dick contains a subplot where a novel positing how the Allies could have won World War II is written by a man who lives in a world where they did not, analogous to the alternate-alternate history of Churchill's Gettysburg essay.
