= J. C. Squire =

British writer, historian and editor (1884–1958)

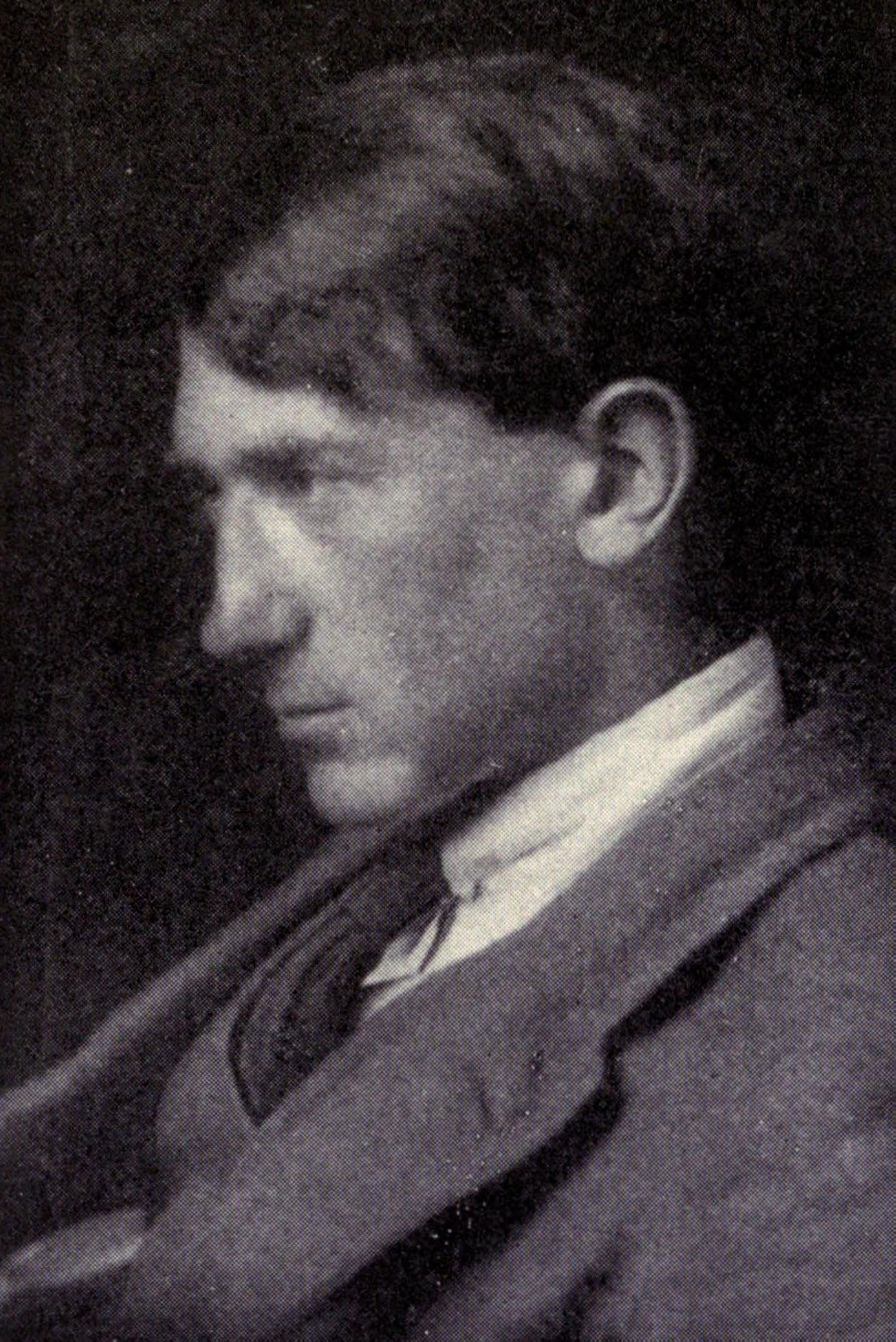
- Born: John Collings Squire; 2 April 1884; Plymouth, England
- Died: 20 December 1958 (aged 74)
- Education: St. John's College, Cambridge
- Occupations: Writer and literary editor
- Writing career
- Notable work: London Mercury

Sir John Collings Squire (2 April 1884 – 20 December 1958) was an English writer, most notable as editor of the London Mercury, a major literary magazine in the interwar period. He antagonised several eminent authors, but attracted a coterie that was dubbed the Squirearchy. He was also a poet and historian, who captained a famous literary cricket-team called the Invalids.

== Biography ==
Born in Plymouth, he was educated at Blundell's School and St. John's College, Cambridge. He was one of those published in the Georgian poetry collections of Edward Marsh. His own Selections from Modern Poets anthology series, launched in 1921, became definitive of the conservative style of Georgian poetry.

He began reviewing for The New Age; through his wife he had met Alfred Orage. His literary reputation was first made by a flair for parody, in a column Imaginary Speeches in The New Age from 1909.

His poetry from World War I was satirical; at the time he was reviewing for the New Statesman, using the name Solomon Eagle (taken from a Quaker of the seventeenth century) – one of his reviews from 1915 was of The Rainbow by D. H. Lawrence. Squire had been appointed literary editor when the New Statesman was set up in 1912; he was noted as an adept and quick journalist, at ease with contributing to all parts of the journal. He was acting editor of the New Statesman in 1917–18, when Clifford Sharp was in the British Army, and more than competently sustained the periodical. When the war ended he found himself with a network of friends and backers, controlling a substantial part of London's literary press.

From 1919 to 1934, Squire was the editor of the monthly periodical, the London Mercury. It showcased the work of the Georgian poets and was an important outlet for new writers. Alec Waugh described the elements of Squire's 'hegemony' as acquired largely by accident, consequent on his rejection for military service for bad sight. Squire's natural persona was of a beer-drinking, cricketing West Countryman; his literary cricket XI, the Invalids (originally made up of men who had been wounded in the First World War), were immortalised in A. G. Macdonell's England, Their England, with Squire as Mr. William Hodge, editor of the London Weekly. In July 1927 he became an early radio commentator on Wimbledon.

In his book If It Had Happened Otherwise (1931) he collected a series of essays, many of which could be considered alternative histories, from some of the leading historians of the period (including Hilaire Belloc and Winston Churchill); in America it was published that same year in somewhat different form under the title If: or, History Rewritten.

Squire was knighted in 1933, and after leaving the London Mercury in 1934, he became a reader for Macmillans, the publishers; in 1937, he became a reviewer for the Illustrated London News.

His eldest son was Raglan Squire, an architect known for his work at Rangoon University in the 1950s, as the architect for the conversion of the houses in Eaton Sq, London into flats thus ensuring the preservation of that great London Square, and many buildings including offices and hotels in the Middle East and elsewhere. His second son was Anthony Squire, a pilot film director (The Sound Barrier). His third son Maurice was killed in the Second War while his youngest daughter Julia Baker (née Squire) was a costume designer for theatre and cinema. She married the actor George Baker.

Squire was an expert on Stilton cheese. He also loathed Jazz music, having filed a complaint with BBC radio to demand it stop playing Benny Goodman's music, which he called "an awful series of jungle noises which can hearten no man."

== Politics ==
Squire had joined the Marxist Social Democratic Federation as a young man. During his time at the New Statesman he wrote as a "Fabian liberal", and campaigned on behalf of Liberal Party candidates in Essex and Cambridgeshire. At the 1918 general election he was the Labour candidate for the Cambridge University seat. In the following years he aligned himself once again with the Liberals, standing for them in Brentford and Chiswick at the 1924 general election. His views then moved steadily more rightwards.

Squire met Benito Mussolini in 1933, and was one of the founders of the January Club, set up on 1 January 1934. He held in it the position of chairman or Secretary, and claimed that it was not a Fascist organisation. It was a dining club with invited speakers, and was closely connected to Oswald Mosley's British Union of Fascists, which nominated members. According to the historian Sir Charles Petrie (who, like Squire, wrote regularly for the Illustrated London News), Squire "found the atmosphere uncongenial before long".

== Reputation ==
The Bloomsbury group named the coterie of writers that surrounded Squire as the Squirearchy. Alan Pryce-Jones was Squire's assistant on the Mercury and wrote

Among his contemporaries ... his reputation was variable. Many of them, such as Virginia Woolf, found him coarse; they thought, with reason, that he drank too much; they had little confidence in the group, known as the Squirearchy, which surrounded him.

In a fairly recent study, the academic Leonard Diepeveen explored the particularly strained relationship between Squire and literary Modernists:

Virginia Woolf wrote that Squire was "more repulsive than words can express, and malignant into the bargain". [...] Eliot attacked Squire repeatedly, at one point describing him as a critic "whose solemn trifling fascinates multitudes". [...] Eliot also acknowledged that Squire wielded a lot of power; because of Squire's skill as a journalist, his success would be modernism's disaster. Eliot wrote: "If he succeeds, it will be impossible to get anything good published".

Squire is generally credited with the one-liner "I am not so think as you drunk I am", which appeared as the refrain of his Ballade of Soporific Absorption.

T. S. Eliot accused Squire of using the London Mercury to saturate literary London with journalistic and popular criticism. According to Robert H. Ross

By 1920 Squire was well on his way towards establishing a literary coterie of the Right just as partisan, as militant and as dedicated as the Leftist coteries.

John Middleton Murry took an adversarial line towards Squire, seeing his London Mercury as in direct competition with his own The Athenaeum. Roy Campbell sometimes mocked Squire in verse.

Since his death the reputation of Squire has declined; scholarship has absorbed the strictures of his contemporaries, such as F. S. Flint, openly critical of Squire in 1920. Squire is now considered to be on the "blimpish" wing of the reaction to modernist work.

A reappraisal of the periodical network of early twentieth-century literary London, and problems with the term modernism, have encouraged scholars to cast their nets beyond the traditional venue of modernism – the little magazine – to seek to better understand the role mass-market periodicals such as the London Mercury played in promoting new and progressive writers.

== Archives ==
- Papers of Sir John Collings Squire are held at the Cadbury Research Library, University of Birmingham.
- Sir John Collings Squire Collection, Harry Ransom Center Collections, University of Texas, Austin. https://norman.hrc.utexas.edu/fasearch/findingAid.cfm?eadid=01014

== Bibliography ==
- Socialism and Art (1907 - under the name Jack C. Squire)
- Poems and Baudelaire flowers (1909)
- Imaginary Speeches And Other Parodies in Prose And Verse (1912)
- William the Silent (1912)
- Steps to Parnassus: and other parodies & diversions (1913)
- The Three Hills and Other Poems (1913)
- The Survival of the Fittest: and other poems (1916)
- Twelve poems (1916)
- The Lily of Malud and Other Poems (1917)
- The Gold Tree (1917)
- Books in general (1919)
- Poems: First Series (1919)
- The Moon (1920)
- Books in general: Second Series (1920)
- The Birds and Other Poems (1920)
- Tricks of the trade (1920)
- Books in general: Third Series (1921)
- Selections From Modern Poets (1921)
- The Collected Poems of James Elroy Flecker (1921)
- A Book of Women's Verse (1921)
- Collected Parodies (1921)
- Poems: Second Series (1921)
- Life and letters: essays (1921)
- Books reviewed (1922)
- Essays at Large (1922)
- Poems about birds: from the Middle Ages to the present day (1922)
- American poems, and others (1923)
- Essays on Poetry (1923)
- The Grub Street Nights Entertainments (1924)
- Poems in One Volume (1926)
- The Cambridge Book of Lesser Poets (1927)
- Robin Hood: a farcical romantic pastoral (1928)
- Apes and Parrots: An Anthology of Parodies (1929)
- Life at the Mermaid (1930)
- If It Had Happened Otherwise (1931)
- Younger poets of to-day (1932)
- A face in candlelight: & other poems (1932)
- Flowers of speech: being lectures in words and forms in literature (1935)
- Reflections and memories (1935)
- Shakespeare as a Dramatist (1935)
- Water-Music: Or a Fortnight of Bliss (1939)
- Collected Poems (1959)
