= Sally Home =

British actress (1930–1992)

- Born: 27 September 1930; Southsea, Hampshire, England
- Died: 3 March 1992 (aged 61); Wiltshire, England
- Occupation: Actress
- Spouse: George Baker (m. 1974)
- Children: 1

Mary Sally Home (27 September 1930 – 3 March 1992), born in Southsea, was a English actress whose career encompassed stage, television and radio.

== Life and career ==
Her stage roles included Carla in Robert Muller's Night Conspirators, alongside Peter Wyngarde, both on television and the subsequent stage play in the West End and on tour. In 1965 she appeared in Anouilh's The Cavern (La grotte) in London, alongside Alec McCowen, Griffith Jones, Geoffrey Bayldon, and Siobhan McKenna, and in 1971 in Noël Coward's Tonight at 8.30 with Millicent Martin.

On the radio she played Claire Nash in the BBC Radio 2 soap opera Waggoners' Walk NW.

Home took a variety of parts in television productions from the 1960s, mainly straight drama but also comedy. In a 1969 BBC TV adaptation of Dickens' Dombey and Son she took the dual roles, of the haughty and tragic Edith Dombey (Granger) and of her cousin the vengeful Alice Marwood.

== Personal life ==
Home met George Baker when they appeared together in the television series Rupert of Hentzau in 1964 and they married ten years later; they had one daughter. Home died 1992 aged 61 in Devizes St Mary, Wiltshire, England.

== Television appearances ==
- 1960 Aren't We All? (Hon. Mrs W Tatham) BBC TV
- 1960 The Fanatics (Gwen Freeman) BBC TV
- 1961 The Weasel
- 1962 Charley was my darling (Barbara Willow) BBC
- 1963 The Teachers (Kathie Elliot) Associated-Rediffusion
- 1963 Julius Caesar (Portia) BBC (Shakespeare)
- 1964 Rupert of Hentzau (Helga von Tarlenheim) BBC (sequel to The Prisoner of Zenda)
- 1964 A Danger to Others (Julie Lamotte) Rediffusion
- 1967 Witch Hunt (Maggie Lowther) BBC2 series
- 1967 The Moon and Sixpence (Amy Strickland) BBC
- 1969 Dombey and Son (Edith Dombey (Granger)/Alice Marwood) BBC TV serialisation of Dickens novel
- 1972 New Scotland Yard (Angela Kingdom) LWT series 2 episode 7 'Papa Charlie'
- 1972 The Fenn Street Gang (staff nurse) LWT series 1 episode 20 'Who's Minding the Shop?'; series 2 episode 7 'The Lady with the Lamp'; LWT series 2 episode 14 'Dypsomania on Sea'
- 1973 New Scotland Yard (Angela Kingdom) LWT series 3 episode 11 'Monopoly'
- 1974 Death or Glory Boy (Lady Otley) Yorkshire TV – episode 'Early Breakfast'
- 1975 Nightingale's Boys (Brenda Cartwright) Granada series 'A.J.'
- 1975 Sam and the River (Mrs Redmond) BBC
- 1977 Marie Curie (Henriette Perrin) BBC TV series
- 1977 Wings (Hon Evelyn Gaylion) BBC TV series series 1 episode 9 'New Deal'; series 2 episode 4 'Transfer'
- 1979 BBC Television Shakespeare: Henry VIII (Patience) BBC
- 1980 Holding the Fort (Lt. Col. Featherstonehaugh) LWT situation comedy - episode 'Jumping the Gun'
- 1983 Fräulein Elsa (cast) BBC play
- 1984 Data Protection, The Law and You (cast) Video Arts
- 1987 Suspicion (Mrs Barham) HTV (based on Hitchcock)
- 1991 Deptford Graffiti (Mrs G.) Channel 4
