= Rupert of Hentzau (TV series) =

1964 British television series

Rupert of Hentzau is a 1964 British television series based on the 1898 novel Rupert of Hentzau, which ran for six half-hour episodes. It starred George Baker, Barbara Shelley, Peter Wyngarde, John Phillips, Tristram Jellinek, Sally Home and Derek Blomfield. It was recorded at the BBC Television Centre in Wood Lane, west London. All six episodes are listed as being lost.

== Synopsis ==
Three years after the events of the Prisoner of Zenda, Queen Flavia writes to her true love, an Englishman named Rudolf Rassendyll. The letter is intercepted by Rupert of Hentzau, an out-of-favour aristocrat, who sees a chance of re-establishing himself at court by bringing news of the letter to the Ruritanian King.

Rassendyll is forced to travel to Ruritania to help the Queen, and is then forced to take the place of the King once more following his assassination.

== Episodes ==
- "The Queen's Goodbye": 19 April 1964
- "Return to Zenda": 26 April 1964
- "Audience with the King": 3 May 1964
- "The Wheel of Chance": 10 May 1964
- "A Perilous Reunion": 17 May 1964
- "The Decision of Fate": 24 May 1964

== Cast ==
Actor	Role
George Baker	Rudolf Rassendyll
Barbara Shelley	Queen Flavia
Peter Wyngarde	Rupert of Hentzau
John Phillips	Colonel Zapt
Tristram Jellinek	Fritz von Tarlenheim
Sally Home	Helga von Tarlenheim
Derek Blomfield	Count Luzau-Rischenheim
John Breslin	Bauer
Mark Burns	Lieutenant Bernenstein
Nora Gordon	Mother Holf
Robert James	James
Amanda Reiss	Rosa Holf

== Theme music ==
Scherzo of Anton Bruckner's 7th symphony
