= George Baker (British actor) =

English actor and writer (1931–2011)

George Baker MBE
- Born: George Morris Baker; 1 April 1931; Varna, Kingdom of Bulgaria
- Died: 7 October 2011 (aged 80); West Lavington, Wiltshire, England
- Occupations: Actor; writer
- Years active: 1947–2007
- Spouse(s): Julia Squire (m. 1950; div. 1974) Sally Home (m. 1974; died 1992) Louie Ramsay (m. 1993; died 2011)
- Children: 5

George Morris Baker (1 April 1931 – 7 October 2011) was an English actor and writer. He was best known for portraying Tiberius in I, Claudius, and Inspector Wexford in The Ruth Rendell Mysteries.

== Early life ==
Baker was born in Varna, Bulgaria. His father was an English businessman and honorary vice consul and his mother an Irish Red Cross nurse who moved to Bulgaria to help fight cholera.

He attended Lancing College, Sussex; he then appeared as an actor in repertory theatre and at The Old Vic.

== Career ==
=== Early film stardom ===
Baker's first film was The Intruder (1953). He made his name in The Dam Busters (1955), and his first starring role was in The Ship That Died of Shame (1955) with Richard Attenborough.

Baker also starred as a leading man in The Woman for Joe (1955) opposite Diane Cilento; The Feminine Touch (1956), playing a handsome doctor in a film about nurses; A Hill in Korea (1956), playing a heroic soldier, with Robert Shaw and Stanley Baker in support; and The Extra Day (1956), a comedy. The same year he appeared in the West End in Agatha Christie's play Towards Zero.

Baker was also the lead in These Dangerous Years (1957), an attempt to make a film star of Frankie Vaughan. He was a doctor again in No Time for Tears (1957) and played a royalist swashbuckling hero of the English Civil War in The Moonraker (1958). He supported Diana Dors in Tread Softly Stranger (1958). However, he never quite became a movie star.

Baker's later films include Lancelot and Guinevere (1963) and Curse of the Fly (1965).

=== Television work ===
Over time, Baker became better known as a television actor. He had the heroic lead in Rupert of Hentzau (1964), played security chief Thallon in Undermind (1965), and was the second (to Guy Doleman) of many actors to portray the role of "Number Two" in the series The Prisoner, appearing in the series' first episode. He portrayed the character of George King in Dennis Potter's The Bone Grinder (1968), a metaphor for the decline of the British Empire and the rise of American power in the post-war world.

He appeared in his own television comedy series Bowler. He was also in the first episode of Some Mothers Do 'Ave 'Em, playing a company boss interviewing the show's hapless main character.

In the acclaimed 1976 drama serial I, Claudius, Baker played the emperor Tiberius Caesar. George R. R. Martin, author of the book series A Song of Ice and Fire, which was later adapted into TV's Game of Thrones, has stated that the historical Tiberius and Baker's performance in particular were part of the inspiration for his character Stannis Baratheon. He also appeared in an episode of Get Some In!.

In 1977, he starred as Inspector Roderick Alleyn in the Ngaio Marsh Theatre, comprising four adaptations of the crime and mystery novels of Ngaio Marsh with New Zealand settings, in a production for New Zealand television. From 1987 to 2000, he played Inspector Reg Wexford in numerous television adaptations of mysteries by Ruth Rendell, and this is probably the role for which he became best known. In 1993, following the death of his second wife, he married the actress Louie Ramsay, who played Mrs Wexford in the same television series.

He also appeared in The Baron, Survivors, Minder in Series 1's '"You Gotta Have Friends", Coronation Street (as brewery owner Cecil Newton), in the Doctor Who story Full Circle and as twin brothers in a 2005 episode of Midsomer Murders titled "The House in the Woods".

Baker also appeared in the British comedy television series The Goodies' episode "Tower of London" as the "Chief Beefeater", as well as in the sitcom No Job for a Lady, and he is popularly known for playing Captain Benson, the James Bond ally in the film The Spy Who Loved Me, and for playing Sir Hilary Bray, a heraldry expert, in On Her Majesty's Secret Service. Later, when Bond, played by George Lazenby, impersonates Bray to gain access to Blofeld, Baker's voice was dubbed in place of Lazenby's to provide the accent. Baker also played an (uncredited) NASA engineer in You Only Live Twice.

Ian Fleming considered Baker to be the ideal candidate to play James Bond in the films, but the role went to Sean Connery, because Baker had prior commitments.

He played a character called "Jamus Bondus" in an episode of the 1970s farcical sitcom Up Pompeii!.

Baker's first theatre work was in repertory at Deal, Kent. His major stage credits include a season with The Old Vic company (1959–61), where he played Bolingbroke in Richard II, Jack in The Importance of Being Earnest and Warwick in Saint Joan. In 1965, he started his own touring company, Candida Plays, based at the Theatre Royal, Bury St Edmunds, Suffolk. He was Claudius in Buzz Goodbody's celebrated, modern-dress Hamlet for the Royal Shakespeare Company in 1975.

In 1980, Baker wrote Fatal Spring, a play for television dealing with lives of poets Wilfred Owen, Siegfried Sassoon and Robert Graves; this appeared on BBC Two on 7 November 1980. It won him a United Nations peace award. His other writing credits included four of the Wexford screenplays.

Baker was the subject of This Is Your Life in 1995 when he was surprised by Michael Aspel during a photo shoot on board a boat at Port Solent on the Hampshire coast. He also appeared on Lily Savage's Blankety Blank.

== MBE ==
In 2007, Baker was made a Member of the Order of the British Empire (MBE) for his charitable work helping to establish a youth club in his home village.

== Personal life ==
Baker's third wife, Louie Ramsay, who died earlier in 2011, played his onscreen wife Dora in The Ruth Rendell Mysteries. Baker was survived by five daughters (four from his first marriage to Julia Squire, one from his second to Sally Home).

Baker’s eldest daughter is Candida Baker, an Australian journalist and author, who moved to Australia in 1977. Her published works include fiction, non-fiction and autobiographical writing. She is known for her long-standing interest in horses and natural horsemanship.

His granddaughter Kim Sherwood is a writer; her debut novel, Testament, was inspired by her paternal grandmother's experience of the Holocaust as well as her grief over Baker's death. Sherwood was selected in 2021 to write a trilogy of James Bond books, the franchise of which Baker participated in several of its film adaptations, becoming the first woman to do so.

== Death ==
Baker died of pneumonia, following a stroke, on 7 October 2011 at the age of 80.

== Filmography ==
=== Film ===
Year	Title	Role	Notes
1953	The Intruder	Adjutant	
1955	The Ship That Died of Shame	Bill	
1955	The Dam Busters	Flight Lieutenant D.J.H. David Maltby, D.S.O., D.F.C	
1955	The Woman for Joe	Joe Harrop	
1956	The Feminine Touch	Jim	
1956	A Hill in Korea	Lt. Butler	
1956	The Extra Day	Steven Marlow	
1957	These Dangerous Years	Padre	
1957	No Time for Tears	Dr. Nigel Barnes	
1958	The Moonraker	The Moonraker	
1958	Tread Softly Stranger	Jonny Mansell	
1964	Lancelot and Guinevere	Sir Gawaine	
1964	The Finest Hours	Lord Randolph	Voice
1965	Curse of the Fly	Martin Delambre	
1967	Mister Ten Per Cent	Lord Edward	
1967	You Only Live Twice	NASA Engineer	Uncredited
1969	Justine	British Ambassador David Mountolive	
1969	Goodbye, Mr. Chips	Lord Sutterwick	
1969	On Her Majesty's Secret Service	Sir Hilary Bray	
1970	The Executioner	Philip Crawford	
1973	A Warm December	Dr. Henry Barlow	
1975	Three for All	Eddie Boyes	
1976	Intimate Games	Professor Gottlieb	
1976	The Twelve Tasks of Asterix	Additional Voices	English dub
1977	The Spy Who Loved Me	Admiral Benson	
1978	The Thirty Nine Steps	Sir Walter Bullivant	
1980	North Sea Hijack	Fletcher	
1980	Hopscotch	Westlake	
1987	Out of Order	Chief Inspector	
1988	For Queen and Country	Kilcoyne	

=== Television ===
Year	Title	Role	Notes
1957	Sunday Night Theatre	Percy French	Episode: "The Last Troubador"
1957–1961	ITV Play of the Week	Various	4 episodes
1957–1968	Armchair Theatre	Various	5 episodes
1959	Play of the Week	Various	4 episodes, including The Square Ring
1959	Nick of the River	Detective Inspector D.H.C. 'Nick' Nixon	
1961	ITV Television Playhouse	Louis Cordunet	Episode: "Boule de Suif"
1961	Maigret	Dominic Pere	Episode: "The Simple Case"
1964	Rupert of Hentzau	Rudolf Rassendyll / King Rudolf V	Miniseries
1965	The Sullavan Brothers	Edward Drayton	Episode: "Insufficient Evidence"
1965	Drama 61-67	Peter Evett	Episode: "A Question of Disposal"
1965–1967	The Wednesday Play	Various	4 episodes
1966	Theatre 625	Edward Jackson/Matthew Hobhouse	2 episode
1966	The Baron	Frank Ashton	Episode: "So Dark the Night"
1967	The Prisoner	The New Number Two	Episode: "Arrival"
1968	Thirty-Minute Theatre	Ernest Whipple	Episode: "Happiness is E Shaped"
1968	Comedy Playhouse	Commander Benbow	Episode: "Stiff Upper Lip"
1968–1979	ITV Playhouse	George King/Robert Ballad	2 episodes
1970	Paul Temple	Mark Hill	Episode: "Games People Play"
1970	Doomwatch	John Mitchell	Episode: "Train and De-Train"
1970	Up Pompeii!	Jamdus Bondus	Episode: "Secret Agents James Bondus"
1970	The Goodies	Chief Beefeater	Episode: "Tower of London"
1970–1976	Z-Cars	Various	4 episodes
1971	BBC Play of the Month	Morell	Episode: "Candida"
1971	The Persuaders!	Britten	Episode: "Chain of Events"
1972	The Main Chance	Philip Lockley	Episode: "Mandala"
1972	New Scotland Yard	John Randall	Episode: "Two Into One Will Go"
1972	The Fenn Street Gang	Stanley Bowler	4 episodes
1973	Bowler	Stanley Bowler	
1973	Some Mothers Do 'Ave 'Em	Mr. Lewis	Episode: "Getting a Job"
1973	The Protectors	George Dixon	Episode: "Your Witness"
1974	Whodunnit?	Det. Inspector Martin	Episode: "The Final Chapter"
1975	Survivors	Arthur Wormley	Episode: "Genesis"
1975	Spy Trap	Colonel Jacoby	Episode: "April Sixty-Seven"
1976	Get Some In!	Wing-Commander Birch	Episode: "Flight"
1976	Softly, Softly: Task Force	Frank Chandler	Episode: "Baked Beans"
1976	I, Claudius	Tiberius	10 episodes
1977	Ngaio Marsh Theatre	Chief Inspector Roderick Alleyn	4 miniseries
1979	Empire Road	Mr. Butterworth	Episode: "Godfadder at Bay"
1980	Doctor Who	Decider Login	Serial: "Full Circle"
1980	Lady Killers	Terence O'Connor	Episode: "Don't Let Them Kill Me on Wednesday"
1980–1989	Minder	Altman/Cooper	2 episodes
1981	Jackanory Playhouse	Janaka	Episode: "The Mouse, the Merchant and the Elephant"
1981	Crown Court		Episode: "The Merry Widow Part 1"
1981	The Gentle Touch	Gerald Harvey	2 episodes
1982	Q.E.D.	Sir Harold Metcalfe	Episode: "The Great Motor Race"
1982	The Chinese Detective	Jack Balfe	Episode: "Chorale"
1982–1983	Triangle	David West	Seasons 2-3
1983	Agatha Christie's Partners in Crime	Whittington	Episode: "The Secret Adversary"
1984–1986	Robin of Sherwood	Sir Richard of Leaford	4 episodes
1984	Hart to Hart	George Damos	Episode: "Death Dig"
1984	A Woman of Substance	Bruce McGill	Miniseries
1985	Marjorie and Men	Norton Phillips	Episode: "Be Your Age"
1985	We'll Support You Evermore	Colonel	TV film
1986	Dead Head	Eldridge	3 episodes
1986	If Tomorrow Comes	Maximillian Pierpont	1 episode
1986	Time After Time	Valentine Swift	TV film
1986	Screen Two	Valentine Swift/Greaves	2 episodes
1986	Room at the Bottom	Director General	2 episodes
1987	Miss Marple	Inspector Fred Davy	Episode: "At Bertram's Hotel"
1987	The Charmer	Harold Bennett	2 episodes
1987–2000	The Ruth Rendell Mysteries	Inspector Wexford	
1988	Bergerac	Higgins	Episode: "A Man of Sorrows"
1990	No Job for a Lady	Godfrey Eagan	Seasons 1-2
2001	Randall & Hopkirk (Deceased)	Berry Pomeroy	Episode: "O Happy Isle"
2001	Back to the Secret Garden	Will Weatherstaff	TV film
2003	Coronation Street	Cecil Newton	6 episodes
2005	Midsomer Murders	Charlie and Jack Magwood	Episode: "The House in the Woods"
2005	Spooks	Hugo Ross	Episode: "The Russian"
2007	Heartbeat	Maurice Dodson	Episode: "Vendetta"
2007	New Tricks	Steve Palmer	Episode: "Ducking and Diving"

== Publications ==
- Baker, George (1989). A Cook for All Seasons. United Kingdom: Boxtree. ISBN 978-1-85283-254-4.
- Baker, George (2002). The Way to Wexford. United Kingdom: Headline. ISBN 978-0-7472-5381-5.
