= Erika Hoffman =

English actress

- Occupation: Actress
- Known for: Brush Strokes

Erika Hoffman is a British actress known for portraying Lesley Bainbridge in the BBC sitcom Brush Strokes from series three onwards. When the Brush Strokes series ended, she joined fellow cast member Howard Lew Lewis in the Channel 4 comedy series Chelmsford 123, where she played Gargamadua.

== Career ==
In 1986, she played Anna, a 19-year-old pregnant German girl, in the Only Fools and Horses episode "From Prussia with Love". In the ITV comedy Room at the Bottom, she played secretary Nancy, alongside James Bolam and Richard Wilson.

In the Yorkshire Television 1986 comedy Home To Roost, she played April, a charity worker, alongside John Thaw and Reece Dinsdale. She also appeared in a minor role in Just Good Friends. She appeared in the 1990s soap opera Machair, playing Charlotte Van Agten. Hoffman appeared on stage and in television films such as Last Days of Patton and as "The Lady" in To Play the King.

== Filmography ==
=== Television ===
Year	Title	Role	Notes
1984	Minder	Faith	Episode: "The Second Time Around"
1984	No Place Like Home	Sandra	2 episodes
1984	Oxbridge Blues	Girl at picnic	Episode: "Sleeps Six"
1984	Just Good Friends	Karina	Episode: "Special"
1985	Jenny's War	Gerta	4 episodes
1986	Hilary	Lois	Episode: "Over the Hill?"
1986	Only Fools and Horses	Anna	Episode: "From Prussia with Love"
1986	Fairly Secret Army	Nurse	Episode: "I've Got a Job for You"
1986	Home to Roost	April	Episode: "Plastic Dreamworld"
1986	The Last Days of Patton	Young Beatrice	Television film
1986	Lytton's Diary	Stephanie	Episode: "The Miracle Man"
1986–1988	Room at the Bottom	Nancy / Secretary	7 episodes
1987–1991	Brush Strokes	Lesley	26 episodes
1988	Chelmsford 123	Gargamadua	6 episodes
1988	Tales of the Unexpected	Suzie Anderson	Episode: "Mr. Know-All"
1989	Ball-Trap on the Cote Sauvage	Mrs. Topless	Television film
1992	Casualty	Helen Holloway	Episode: "Silent Night"
1993	To Play the King	The Lady	4 episodes
1994	Machair	Charlotte Van Agten	2 episodes
1995	The Final Cut	Princess	2 episodes
1996	The Bill	Receptionist	Episode: "Black Money"
