= John Phillips (actor) =

English stage and television actor (1914–1995)

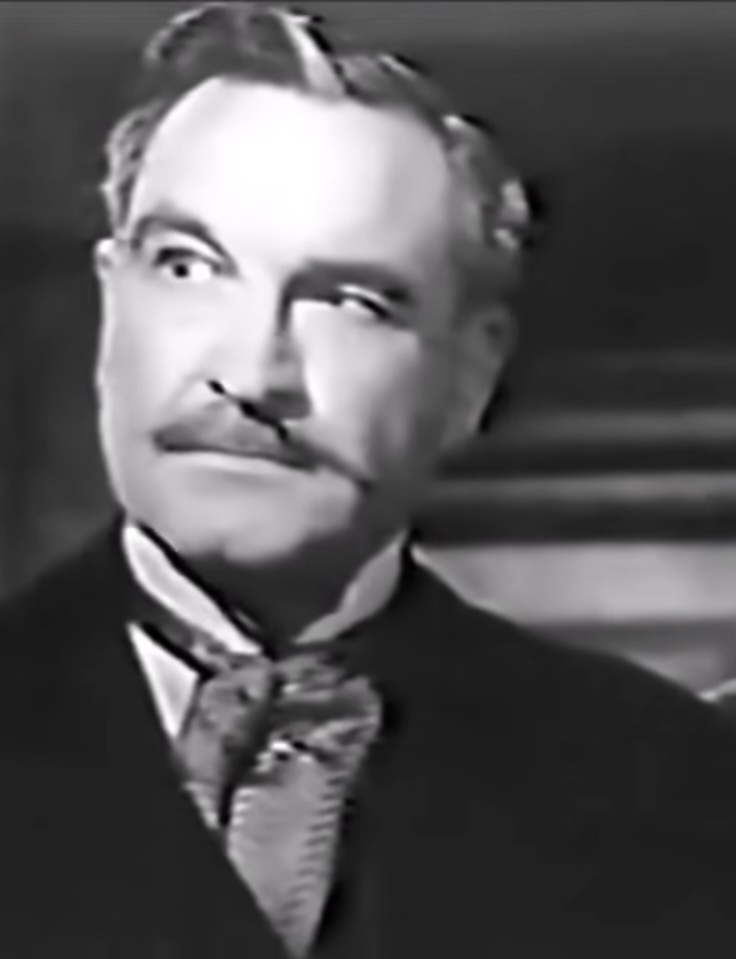
- Phillips in an episode of One Step Beyond (1961)
- Born: William John Phillips; 20 July 1914; Birmingham, England
- Died: 11 May 1995 (aged 80); Oswestry, Shropshire, England
- Occupation: Actor
- Years active: 1935–1984
- Spouse: Pauline Francis-Jones (m. 1940)
- Children: 2

William John Phillips MC (20 July 1914 – 11 May 1995) was an English actor. He is known for the role of Chief Superintendent Robins in the television series Z-Cars and for his work as a Shakespearean stage actor.

== Early life ==
Phillips was born in Birmingham, Warwickshire in 1914, was educated at Oswestry and began his acting career at Birmingham Rep in the 1930s. During the Second World War, Phillips served in the Royal Warwickshire Regiment and was awarded the Military Cross.

== Career ==
=== Stage ===
His early theatre roles included the Ghost in the 1955 Peter Brook – Paul Scofield production of Hamlet at the Phoenix Theatre; the American Ambassador in Peter Ustinov's 1957 production of Romanoff and Juliet; and Prospero in the 1959 production of John Dryden and William Davenant's version of The Tempest, at the Old Vic. Phillips continued to work as a stage actor until his retirement in the 1980s.

=== Television ===
Phillips appeared in a number of television roles, which included: Danger Man (1962), Lieutenant Colonel John Whitley in Frontier (1968), Jack Frazer in The Onedin Line (1972–76), Grand Duke Nicholas in Fall of Eagles (1974), Josiah Wedgewood in Days of Hope (1975), Naso in Jesus of Nazareth (1977) and Dr Charles Langley-Beard in The Old Men at the Zoo (1983). His role as Chief Superintendent Robins (1962–78) in Z-Cars and Softly, Softly was perhaps his most memorable.

== Death ==
Phillips died in Oswestry, Shropshire, on 11 May 1995.

== Selected filmography ==
- 1938: The Wooing of Anne Hathaway (TV Movie)
- 1952: Angels One Five .... Engineer Officer
- 1954: The Monkey's Paw (TV Short) .... Sergeant-Major Morris
- 1955: Noah Gives Thanks (TV Movie) .... Mr. Pebble, Vicar of Crockitt
- 1955: The Dark Avenger .... Second French Knight
- 1955: Richard III .... Norfolk
- 1955: The Vise (TV Series) .... Philip Twyford (uncredited)
- 1955-1959 BBC Sunday-Night Theatre (TV Series) .... Jacob Dillon / Colonel Davies / Escales / Chorus
- 1956: Women Without Men .... Male Guard at Gate (uncredited)
- 1956: Passport to Treason .... Police Driver (uncredited)
- 1956: The Count of Monte Cristo (TV Series) .... Major Du Valle
- 1956: The Black Tulip (TV Series) .... John de Witte
- 1956: Theatre Royal (TV Series)
- 1957: The Adventures of Peter Simple (TV Series) .... Captain Savage, RN
- 1957: Theatre Night (TV Series) .... Hooper Moulsworth
- 1957: Fortune Is a Woman .... Willis Croft
- 1957: The Shiralee .... Doctor
- 1957-1965: ITV Play of the Week (TV Series) .... John Anthony / Prime Minister / Mr. Smith / John Graham Whitfield / Cromwell / Professor Robert Linden / Judge Gaunt / General von Sauberzweig / Anthony Folland / David Crampton / Mr. Friday
- 1958: Television World Theatre (TV Series) .... The Mayor / Count Peter Zichy
- 1958: I Accuse! .... Prosecutor - Esterhazy Trial
- 1958: Doomsday for Dyson (TV Movie) .... General Schalz
- 1958: Dunkirk .... Boat Owner Spokesman (uncredited)
- 1958: Floods of Fear .... Dr. Matthews
- 1959: Bleak House (TV Mini-Series) .... Mr. Tulkinghorn
- 1960: Saturday Playhouse (TV Series) .... Jeffrey Bellenger
- 1960: Somerset Maugham Hour (TV Series) .... Jeffrey Bellenger
- 1960: Village of the Damned .... General Leighton
- 1960: Follow That Horse! .... American Delegate (uncredited)
- 1960: Man in the Moon .... Professor Stephens
- 1960-1961: Danger Man (TV Series) .... Coyannis / Paul
- 1961: Romanoff and Juliet .... Hooper Moulsworth
- 1961: One Step Beyond (TV Series) .... Frank
- 1961: Offbeat
- 1961: The Roman Spring of Mrs. Stone .... Tom Stone
- 1961-1962: BBC Sunday-Night Play (TV Series) .... Trifonov / Prince Galitzin
- 1962: Under Western Eyes (TV Movie) .... Ivanovich
- 1962: Suspense (TV Series) .... Luther Ross
- 1962: The Hatchet Man (TV Movie) .... George Curnic, head of studio
- 1962: Saki (TV Series) .... Duncan Dullamy
- 1962: Man of the World (TV Series) .... General Montreaux
- 1962: A Prize of Arms .... Col. Fowler
- 1962: We Joined the Navy .... Rear Admiral
- 1962: Thirty-Minute Theatre (TV Series)
- 1962-1978: Z Cars (TV Series) .... Asst. Chief Constable Robins
- 1963: The Mouse on the Moon .... Bracewell - U.S. Delegate
- 1963: First Night (TV Series) .... Gideon Cobb
- 1963: The Sentimental Agent (TV Series) .... Henry Peabody Sr.
- 1964: Becket .... Bishop of Winchester
- 1964: Armchair Theatre (TV Series) .... George
- 1964: Rupert of Hentzau (TV Series) .... Colonel Zapt
- 1964: Smuggler's Bay (TV Series) .... Elzevir Block
- 1964-1966: Sergeant Cork (TV Series) .... Col. Haverlock / Big Ben Lewis
- 1965: Alexander Graham Bell (TV Series) .... Professor Bell
- 1965: Legend of Death (TV Series) .... Edward Gargan
- 1965: Knock on Any Door (TV Series) .... Robert Prettyman
- 1965: Danger Man (TV Series) .... Dr. Brajanska
- 1965: Joey Boy .... Insp. Morgan
- 1965-1968: Theatre 625 (TV Series) .... Clifford Dyke / Alfred Truelove
- 1965-1968: The Wednesday Play (TV Series) .... Councillor Percival / Sir Gilbert Hardacre / Cardinal Runan / Forbes-Wainwright
- 1966: BBC Play of the Month (TV Series) .... Major General Atkins
- 1966: Mystery and Imagination (TV Series) .... Colonel Gaillarde
- 1966-1967: Dixon of Dock Green (TV Series) .... Magistrate / Mr. Parry
- 1967: The Avengers (TV Series) .... Nesbitt
- 1967: The Mummy's Shroud .... Stanley Preston
- 1967: Thirty-Minute Theatre (TV Series) .... Mr. Tredgold
- 1967: The Forsyte Saga (TV Series) .... Sir Alexander MacGown
- 1967: This Way for Murder (TV Mini-Series) .... Barnton
- 1967: Out of Town Theatre (TV Mini-Series) .... Sir Howard Price
- 1967: Torture Garden .... Eddie Storm (segment 2 "Terror Over Hollywood")
- 1968: Softly, Softly (TV Series) .... Det. Chief Supt. Robins
- 1968: Frontier (TV Series) .... Lt. Col. Whitley
- 1968: The Caesars (TV Mini-Series) .... Piso
- 1969: W. Somerset Maugham (TV Series) .... Commandant
- 1969: Christ Recrucified (TV Mini-Series) .... Pope Grigoris
- 1969: Who-Dun-It (TV Series) .... Det. Insp. Hollis
- 1970: Manhunt (TV Series) .... Klintzch
- 1970: Doctor in the House (TV Series) .... Sir Hartley Maynard
- 1970: Confession (TV Series) .... Headmaster
- 1970: The Black Tulip (TV Mini-Series) .... Cornelius de Witt
- 1970: The Main Chance (TV Series) .... Arnold Bingley
- 1970: Horizon (TV Series documentary) .... Mr. Bidder
- 1970-1972: Crime of Passion (TV Series) .... Maître Lacan
- 1970-1980: Play for Today (TV Series) .... Examining judge / Rev. Howard Whithead - Anglican Vicar
- 1971: The Persuaders (TV Series) .... Lanning Koestler
- 1972: Man of Straw (TV Mini-Series) .... Dr. Heuteufel
- 1972-1976: The Onedin Line (TV Series) .... Jack Frazer
- 1973: The Rivals of Sherlock Holmes (TV Series) .... Professor Dyne
- 1973: Jane Eyre (TV Mini-Series) .... Mr. Brocklehurst
- 1973: Wipers Three (TV Movie) .... Admiral Sir John Jellicoe
- 1974: John Halifax, Gentleman (TV Mini-Series) .... Abel Fletcher
- 1974: Fall of Eagles (TV Mini-Series) .... Grand Duke Nicholas
- 1974: The Pallisers (TV Mini-Series) .... Sir Gregory Grogram
- 1974: Father Brown (TV Series) .... Brander Merton
- 1975: Days of Hope (TV Mini-Series) .... Josiah Wedgwood
- 1975 Quiller (TV Series) .... Henry Tulliver
- 1976: The Flight of the Heron (TV Series) .... Cameron of Lochiel
- 1977: Jesus of Nazareth (TV Mini-Series) .... Naso
- 1977: Mr. Big (TV Series) .... Leopold Ruchworth
- 1977: Ripping Yarns (TV Series) .... Colonel Harcourt Badger Owen
- 1977: 1990 (TV Series) .... Attorney General Graham
- 1977: Three Dangerous Ladies .... Urcombe (segment "Mrs. Amworth")
- 1978 Hazell (TV Series) .... Det. Supt. Bull
- 1978: Mrs. Amworth (Short) .... Francis Urcombe
- 1978: Lillie (TV Mini-Series) .... W. E. Gladstone
- 1979: Quadrophenia .... Magistrate
- 1983: Ascendancy .... Wintour
- 1983: The Old Men at the Zoo (TV Series) .... Dr. Charles Langley-Beard
- 1984: Strangers and Brothers (TV Series) .... Reggie Collingwood
- 1985: TV Eye (TV Series) .... Committee Member
- 1987: One by One (TV Series) .... Ben Friedhofer
- 1991: Merlin of the Crystal Cave (TV Series)
- 1992: Leon the Pig Farmer .... Trevor (final film role)
