= The Old Men at the Zoo =

1961 novel by Angus Wilson

- First edition cover
- Author: Angus Wilson
- Language: English
- Genre: Dystopian fiction
- Published: 1961 by Secker and Warburg
- Publication place: United Kingdom
- Media type: Print
- Pages: 352 pp
- OCLC: 4482168
- Dewey Decimal: 823.91
- LC Class: PZ3.W68895

The Old Men at the Zoo is a novel written by Angus Wilson, first published in 1961 by Secker and Warburg. It explores the moral compromises of those in power and the fragility of democratic institutions in crisis.

Written from the perspective of an administrator at the London Zoo, the book deals with events before and during a limited, possibly nuclear war that results in the imposition of a dystopian pan-European dictatorship which imprisons anyone suspected of opposition. Fanatic government representatives plan to use the zoo for the public execution of political prisoners in a return to the Ancient Roman Damnatio ad bestias (condemnation to beasts) before a further change in government lead to another reversal of fates.

The book was adapted, with many changes – nuclear bombing of London, not present in the novel, was added – into a 1983 BBC Television series by the scriptwriter Troy Kennedy Martin.
