= Room at the Bottom (1986 TV series) =

Television series

- Genre: Sitcom
- Written by: John Antrobus; Ray Galton
- Directed by: David Reynolds
- Starring: James Bolam; Keith Barron; Deborah Grant; Richard Wilson
- Composer: Alan Parker
- Country of origin: United Kingdom
- Original language: English
- No. of series: 2
- No. of episodes: 13

Production
- Producers: David Reynolds; Vernon Lawrence
- Running time: 30 minutes
- Production company: Yorkshire Television

Original release
- Network: ITV
- Release: 9 November 1986 – 26 June 1988

Room at the Bottom is a British comedy television series which originally aired on ITV between 9 November 1986 and 26 June 1988.

== Main cast ==
- James Bolam as Nesbitt Gunn
- Keith Barron as Kevin Hughes
- Deborah Grant as Celia Pagett-Smythe
- Richard Wilson as Chaplain Toby Duckworth
- Erika Hoffman as Nancy
- Oliver Cotton as Tom

== Bibliography ==
- Newcomb, Horace . Encyclopedia of Television. Routledge, 2014.
