= Derek Blomfield =

English actor (1920–1964)

- Autographed still, 1954
- Born: Derek Louis Cecil Blomfield; 31 August 1920; London, England
- Died: 23 July 1964 (aged 43); Quimper, Brittany, France
- Occupation: Actor
- Years active: 1935–1964

Derek Blomfield (31 August 1920 – 23 July 1964) was a British actor who appeared in a number of stage, film and television productions between 1935 and his death in 1964.

== Career ==
He trained at LAMDA and made his first stage appearance at the Savoy Theatre in 1934. His stage credits included the title role in The Guinea Pig at the Criterion Theatre, a long run in Witness for the Prosecution at the Winter Garden Theatre, and two years playing Trotter in The Mousetrap at the Ambassadors Theatre in London.

His first film role was at the age of fifteen in the film Turn of the Tide. He first came to wider attention for his appearance as a schoolboy in the Will Hay comedy, The Ghost of St. Michael's. In 1964 he played the role of Count Luzau-Rischenheim in the British television series Rupert of Hentzau.

He died of a heart attack, aged 43, while on holiday with his wife and family in Brittany.

== Filmography ==
Year	Title	Role	Notes
1932	Love on Wheels	Boy	Film debut, Uncredited
1935	Emil and the Detectives	Jerry	
1935	Turn of the Tide	Steve Lunn	
1935	Mutiny on the Bounty	Jeremy	Uncredited
1936	Wedding Group	Undetermined Role	
1936	Shipmates o' Mine	Tony Denton	
1941	The Ghost of St. Michael's	Sunshine	
1942	Alibi	Gerard	
1949	Golden Arrow	1st Officer in Nightclub	
1950	Night and the City	Young Policeman	Uncredited
1951	Appointment with Venus	1st Officer - Admiralty	
1952	The Floating Dutchman	Philip Reid	
1953	Recoil	Wilbur	
1954	Hobson's Choice	Freddy Beenstock	
1956	Reach for the Sky	Civilian Pilot	
1956	It's a Wonderful World	Arranger	
1956	It's Great to Be Young	Paterson, Sports Master	
1956-1957	Vanity Fair	Dobbin	Miniseries
1957	Carry On Admiral	Lieut. Dobson	
1957	Small Hotel	Roland	
1960	Identity Unknown	John Perkins	
1960	Escort for Hire	Jack	
1961	Persuasion	William Elliot	Miniseries
1962	Fate Takes a Hand	Briggs	
1964	Rupert of Hentzau	Count Luzau-Rischenheim	5 episodes
1964	East of Sudan	Second Major	Final film, Uncredited
