= Julia Squire =

British costume designer for film (1926–1989)

- Born: 26 February 1926; Hambledon, Surrey
- Died: 9 August 1989 (aged 63); Oxfordshire
- Occupation: Costume designer

Julia Squire (1926–1989) was a British costume designer for film. Squire established a career within British period, comedy and melodrama cinema in the 1950s, costuming at least fifteen films within the decade.

Born in Surrey, Julia went to St Michael's school, Petworth, then aged 18, she enrolled at Central School of Art, London. Her father was the author and editor J C Squire.

== Career ==
Squire's first film costuming credit was as an assistant to Orry-Kelly on London Town (1946). In 1948, she assisted George K. Benda on Bonnie Prince Charlie, starring David Niven. And the following year, Squire assisted costume designer Roger Furse on the Hitchcock film Under Capricorn (1949). For the whole decade of the 1950s, Squire was busy with a range of British films, working with renowned directors Powell and Pressburger, John Huston, and David Lean, in the "experimental" early days of Technicolor.

In Gone to Earth (1950), Julia and her co-designer Ivy Baker created a period drama that retained the style of the mid-twentieth century. Film historian Jonathan Faiers has described their design of a dress for actor Jennifer Jones as a "shocking shade of yellow... contrasting against the dazzling Technicolor azure sky ... it is otherworldly, exotic, sexual, bewitching and repulsive".

The Magic Box, for which Squire was main costume designer, was made for the Festival of Britain in 1951, and had a costume budget of £20,000 and a panoply of stars in cameo roles. Interviewed to promote the film, Squire explained she had two months to find the right "faded grey suit" for the star Robert Donat, and had a "tricky problem" with Laurence Olivier's policeman's tunic.

In 1952, working from Berman's costume house, Julia Squire designed and supervised the costumes for Moulin Rouge, a colourful biopic of Toulouse-Lautrec, starring José Ferrer. Squire's design work on the film went uncredited, with the more famous name of Elsa Schiaparelli (who designed a number of Zsa Zsa Gabor's costumes) appearing in the credits, along with Marcel Vertès, who took both Art Direction and Costume Design Academy Awards for the film. The New York Times praised the costumes' contribution to the "vivacious and exciting" movie.

== Personal life ==
On 22 December 1950, Julia Squire married George Baker. Their wedding took place at 7.00pm, after Squire had spent a long day managing fittings with Robert Donat for The Magic Box. They had four children, and were later divorced.

Squire died in 1989, in Oxfordshire, England.

== Selected filmography ==
- Under Capricorn (1949) directed by Alfred Hitchcock.
- Gone to Earth (1950), directed by Powell & Pressburger.
- Pandora and the Flying Dutchman (1951), co-designed with Beatrice Dawson.
- The Magic Box (1951)
- Moulin Rouge (1952)
- Women of Twilight (1952)
- The Heart of the Matter (1953)
- The Captain's Paradise (1953)
- An Inspector Calls (1954)
- Father Brown (1954)
- Hobson's Choice (1954), co-designed with John Armstrong.
- The Man Who Loved Redheads (1955)
- Double Cross (1956)
- Port Afrique (1956)
- Beyond this Place (US title Web of Evidence) (1959)
- No Sex Please, We're British (1973)
