= Time After Time (1986 film) =

British-Australian television comedy film

- Based on: Time After Time by Molly Keane
- Written by: Andrew Davies
- Directed by: Bill Hays
- Starring: John Gielgud; Googie Withers; Helen Cherry
- Music by: Jim Parker
- Country of origin: United Kingdom
- Original language: English

Production
- Producer: Terry Coles
- Cinematography: John McGlashan
- Editor: David King
- Running time: 103 minutes

Original release
- Network: BBC
- Release: January 26, 1986

Time After Time is a 1986 British-Australian television comedy film that was broadcast as episode 3 of the second series of BBC's Screen Two. It was directed by Bill Hays and adapted from the Molly Keane novel by Andrew Davies. It features John Gielgud, Googie Withers, Helen Cherry, Ursula Howells, and Trevor Howard.

== Premise ==
A constantly bickering Anglo-Irish family live in a crumbling 'big house', when their lives are interrupted by the unexpected arrival of a German cousin.

== Cast ==
- John Gielgud as Jasper Swift
- Googie Withers as Leda Klein
- Helen Cherry as April Grange-Gorman
- Ursula Howells as May Swift
- Brenda Bruce as June Swift
- Mark Lambert as Christy Lucey
- Trevor Howard as Brigadier Croshawe
- Freddie Jones as Ulick Uniake

== ACE award nomination ==
John Gielgud was nominated for a CableACE Award for Time After Time on the Arts & Entertainment network
