= Lyndhurst =

Lyndhurst may refer to:

== Places ==
=== Australia ===
- Lyndhurst, Clayfield, a heritage-listed house in Brisbane, Queensland
- Lyndhurst, Glebe, a heritage-listed house in Glebe, Sydney, New South Wales
- Lyndhurst, New South Wales
- Lyndhurst, Queensland, a locality in the Shire of Einasleigh in North-West Queensland
- Lyndhurst, South Australia
- Lyndhurst, Victoria
  - Former electoral district of Lyndhurst, Victoria

=== Canada ===
- Lyndhurst, Ontario

=== Hong Kong ===
- Lyndhurst Terrace

=== New Zealand ===
- Lyndhurst, New Zealand, locality in the Ashburton District

=== United Kingdom ===
- Lyndhurst, Hampshire
- Lyndhurst Road, London

=== United States ===
- Lyndhurst (mansion), New York
- Lyndhurst, New Jersey
- Lyndhurst, Ohio
- Lyndhurst, Virginia
- Lyndhurst, Wisconsin

== People ==
- John Copley, 1st Baron Lyndhurst, British lawyer and politician (1772–1863)
- Francis Lyndhurst, English painter, film producer and film director, grandfather of the actor Nicholas Lyndhurst and great-grandfather of the actor Archie Lyndhurst (1878–1952)
- Nicholas Lyndhurst, English actor (born 1961)
- Archie Lyndhurst, English actor and only child of the actor Nicholas Lyndhurst (2000–2020)

== See also ==
- Lindenhurst (disambiguation)
