= After You've Gone (TV series) =

2007 British television series

- Opening titles of After You've Gone
- Genre: Comedy
- Created by: Fred Barron
- Starring: Nicholas Lyndhurst; Celia Imrie; Dani Harmer; Ryan Sampson; Lee Oakes; Vincent Ebrahim; Amanda Abbington
- Theme music composer: Turner Layton
- Opening theme: "After You've Gone" by Jamie Cullum
- Ending theme: "After You've Gone"
- Country of origin: United Kingdom
- Original language: English
- No. of series: 3
- No. of episodes: 25 (list of episodes)

Production
- Running time: 23 × 30 minutes 1 × 45 minutes 1 × 40 minutes
- Production company: Rude Boy Productions

Original release
- Network: BBC One; BBC HD
- Release: 12 January 2007 – 21 December 2008

Related
- My Family (2000–2011)

After You've Gone is a British comedy that aired on BBC One from 12 January 2007 to 21 December 2008. Starring Nicholas Lyndhurst, Celia Imrie, Dani Harmer and Ryan Sampson, After You've Gone was created by Fred Barron, who also created My Family. The writers include Barron, Ian Brown, Katie Douglas, James Hendie, Danny Robins, Andrea Solomons and Dan Tetsell. Three series and two Christmas specials aired, and work on scripts for a fourth series had already begun when the BBC withdrew the commission in November 2008 and cancelled the series.

== Plot ==
When his former wife Ann goes to Africa to help out following a natural disaster, handyman Jimmy Venables has to move back into the marital home to look after his two children, Molly and Alex. Jimmy's former mother-in-law, opinionated and widowed teacher Diana Neal, who has always believed Jimmy to be beneath her, decides to help him out. Diana's husband, Patrick Neal OBE, died in 1996. Fashion-obsessed Molly is an intelligent, if self-centred, girl who sees herself as the only mature person in the household. Eccentric, cheerful Alex (who appears to be on the autism spectrum) is also intelligent, but is quirky and offbeat. Despite frequently bickering, Diana and Jimmy do show a sincere fondness for each other throughout the series.

Jimmy has a girlfriend, Siobhan Casey, a hairdresser, who often feels he does not pay her enough attention. Jimmy's assistant is Kev, a dimwit, while the landlord of his local pub, The Leek and Shepherd, is the pessimistic Bobby. In Series Two, Siobhan is the barmaid at the pub and goes back to college to study Business Studies. She appears less often in Series Three, having been partially written-out by having her split with Jimmy. Actress Amanda Abbington was pregnant at time of filming and so it was decided to make things easier for her by reducing her sizeable role.

Bobby and Kev, meanwhile, have been developing a tendency to team up and do things which annoy Jimmy (such as kidnapping him and locking him in Kev's flat or taking legal action against him). Often compared to My Family, After You've Gone is a light comedy which pulled in good viewing figures despite often being broadcast at the same time as Coronation Street. It was often broadcast on Friday evenings on BBC One and followed by the heavier comedy of Have I Got News for You.

== Characters ==
Actor	Character	Duration	Series	Episodes	Role
Nicholas Lyndhurst	Jimmy Venables	2007–2008	1–3	25	Main
Celia Imrie	Diana	2007–2008	1–3	25	Main
Ryan Sampson	Alexander "Alex" Peter Venables	2007–2008	1–3	25	Main
Dani Harmer	Molly Louise Venables	2007–2008	1–3	25	Main
Lee Oakes	Kev	2007–2008	1–3	25	Main
Vincent Ebrahim	Bobby	2007–2008	1–3	25	Main
Amanda Abbington	Siobhan	2007–2008	1–3	21	Main (Series 1–2); Recurring (Series 3)
Roxanne Ricketts	Ellie	2007	1–2	6	Recurring
Samantha Spiro	Ann	2007	1–2	2	Guest
Rob Knox	Josh	2007	1–2	2	Guest
Sheri-An Davis	Roz	2007	1	2	Guest

=== Cast information ===
Nicholas Lyndhurst and Celia Imrie were already household names by the time they appeared on the programme: Lyndhurst had appeared in Only Fools and Horses, The Two of Us, The Piglet Files and Goodnight Sweetheart, while Imrie previously had featured in dinnerladies and Calendar Girls. Dani Harmer and Ryan Sampson had appeared in various roles previously – the most notable being Harmer in The Story of Tracy Beaker.

== Episodes ==
Series	Episodes	Originally released	
Series	Episodes	First released	Last released
1	7	12 January 2007	23 February 2007
2	9	7 September 2007	23 December 2007
3	9	14 September 2008	21 December 2008

== Theme song ==
The theme song is "After You've Gone" and is performed by Jamie Cullum. The song was composed by Turner Layton with lyrics by Henry Creamer and was originally released in 1918 by Marion Harris.

== Cancellation ==
The BBC announced in January 2008 that it had commissioned a third series with eight episodes and a Christmas special; it also announced that a fourth series had been commissioned, which included ten episodes and a festive one-off for 2009. Later, the BBC announced that the third series would be the last despite writers already working on the scripts.

The cancellation cost the corporation thousands of pounds; a BBC spokesperson said" "We are very proud of the programme and its achievements over the past three years but believe it has now come to a natural end".

Following the abrupt cancellation, there was a proposal to shift the series to radio, using the unfilmed but completed scripts for the fourth series, which the series' writers felt could be developed on a cheap budget, as no scripts needed to be written. However, the proposal did not come to fruition.

== Home media ==
All of the three series of After You've Gone have been released on DVD in the UK (Region 2). The final series was released on 18 January 2010. All 25 episodes, including the Christmas specials, have been released. The first two series of After You've Gone have also been released on DVD in Australia (Region 4).

DVD Title	Disc #	Year	Episode #	DVD releases	
DVD Title	Disc #	Year	Episode #	Region 2	Region 4
Complete Series 1	1	2007	7	24 September 2007	4 September 2008
Complete Series 2	2	2007	8	22 September 2008	3 September 2009
Complete Series 3	2	2008	10	18 January 2010	Not released
