= Alexander Wolfe (musician) =

- Also known as: Alexander Wolfe
- Born: Alexander Gordon; 24 December 1981 (age 44)
- Origin: Cambridge, Cambridgeshire, England
- Occupations: Songwriter, singer, musician
- Years active: 2009–present

Alexander Wolfe (born 24 December 1981) is an English singer-songwriter and musician.

== Early life ==
Born Alexander Gordon in Cambridge, he moved to Woolwich in South East London as a child. Upon leaving school he formed his first band, 'Taxi', with Jamie Cullum, after a chance encounter in a guitar shop on London's Denmark Street. The band toured supporting Paul Weller before finally imploding in the summer of 2002 due, partly, to Cullum's pending solo deal with Universal and partly due to musical differences. During this time Alexander's grandmother Betty died. He took her maiden name 'Wolfe' as his own and decided to pursue a solo career.

== Musical career ==
Alexander released his debut album Morning Brings a Flood in March 2010, his second album Skeletons in September 2012, his third From The Shallows in October 2014 and his most recent full length album ‘Little Death’ in 2020.

Since its release in March 2010 Morning Brings a Flood has garnered significant critical acclaim on both sides of the Atlantic. The New York Post called it "the most beautiful album heard in years. Period" as well as four-star reviews in Q magazine and Uncut which described the album as, "An object lesson in how to wring out every last drop of emotion". The Sunday Times declared it, "A beautiful album".

"Song For the Dead" was used as the opening and closing music for BBC 2 sitcom, Whites, starring Alan Davies. The album was released on Dharma Records in March 2010. It was preceded by the double A-side single "Till Your Ship Comes In" / "Teabags In Ashtrays" which was released in November 2009. "Song for the Dead" was released as a single in May 2010. The Breakdown EP was issued in July 2010.

=== Skeletons ===
Wolfe's second album Skeletons is a mainly acoustic collection, recorded in the house he grew up in Woolwich, South East London.

The album was preceded by two singles, a dark reworking of the Neil Young song, "Don't Let It Bring You Down", in April 2012 and the title track of the album, "Skeletons", in July 2012.

=== From The Shallows ===
His third album 'From The Shallows', was released in October 2014.

From The Shallows features two guest vocals from singer-songwriter Gabrielle Aplin, the first on "Still Life", and also on the penultimate acoustic ode to lost love "Love Is All There Is". Hudson Taylor also add their vocals to album's closing track, "Set Your Shadow Free".

The album was preceded two singles; "Trick of the Light" which was released in August 2014, which received widespread regional and national radio play, and "Sunburn", released in September 2014 which featured an accompanying fan made video, featuring a guest cameo from Huey Morgan from Fun Lovin' Criminals. The video budget going to The Children's Trust.

=== Little Death ===
Alexander released his fourth solo album, Little Death, in 2019.

The album was preceded by a number of singles; "I Can't Get to Sleep", "Oslo", "Breaking The Fall", "Catherine", "Your Love Is a Wheel" and finally "Avalanche", which featured an animated video collaboration with Brazilian filmmaker Ferristico.

== Awards ==
- Emergenza emerging talent UK 2009
- Emergenza European singer/songwriter 2009
- International Acoustic Music Award (IAMA) for Teabags In Ashtrays 2010
- International Songwriting Award for Stuck Under September 2011

== Whites (TV series) ==
Wolfe wrote and performed the opening and closing music for the BBC series Whites, "Song for the Dead".

== Flack ==
Wolfe wrote the soundtrack for the television series, Flack.
