= Unter einer Decke =

- Country of origin: Germany

Unter einer Decke is a German television series, based on the British television series The Two of Us.

== See also ==
- List of German television series
