= Serena Evans =

British actress

- Born: 2 December 1959 (age 66); Westminster, London, England
- Occupation: Actress
- Years active: 1977–present
- Spouse: Daniel Flynn (m. 1990)
- Children: 2

Serena Evans (born 2 December 1959) is a British actress who is best known for playing Police Sergeant Patricia Dawkins in the sitcom The Thin Blue Line which was shown on BBC1 from 1995 to 1996.

== Early life and career ==
Serena Evans was born 2 December 1959, to actor parents Tenniel Evans and Evangeline (née Banks).

Evans played police Sergeant Patricia Dawkins in the BBC1 sitcom The Thin Blue Line from 1995 to 1996. She also had a regular role as Sarah Chapman in ITV sitcom The Piglet Files, and appeared in six episodes of The Comic Strip Presents playing various characters, such as the schoolgirl, in 'The Bad News Tour'.

In 2010, Evans appeared in the role of Mistress Page in The Merry Wives of Windsor at Shakespeare's Globe Theatre in London.

Between 2018 and 2021, she starred in the horror drama, Approaching Shadows; the film premiered at the BFI Southbank in London on 3 December 2021, had a private VIP screening at Vue Rhyl on 21 March 2022, and released digitally on 1 July 2022, through many platforms such as iTunes, Sky Store, Microsoft, YouTube, Google Play and Amazon Prime Video.

== Personal life ==
Evans the granddaughter of actor, director and producer Leslie Banks on her mother's side; her brother Matthew Evans is a TV director. On her father's side she is a direct descendant of Isaac Evans, brother of Mary Ann Evans otherwise known as author George Eliot. She is married to the actor Daniel Flynn and they have two children together.
