= Lindenhurst =

Lindenhurst is the name of some places in the United States:

- Lindenhurst, Illinois
- Lindenhurst, New York
- Lindenhurst, the estate of John Wanamaker

== See also ==
- Lyndhurst (disambiguation)
