= Whites (TV series) =

2010 sitcom

- Main cast members
- Genre: Sitcom
- Written by: Matt King; Oliver Lansley
- Directed by: David Kerr
- Starring: Alan Davies; Darren Boyd; Katherine Parkinson; Stephen Wight; Isy Suttie; Maggie Steed
- Country of origin: United Kingdom
- Original language: English
- No. of series: 1
- No. of episodes: 6

Production
- Producers: Charlie Hanson; Michelle Farr
- Running time: 30 minutes

Original release
- Network: BBC Two
- Release: 28 September – 2 November 2010

Whites is a BBC sitcom, written by Oliver Lansley and Matt King, directed by David Kerr, and starring Alan Davies as the executive chef at a country house hotel. BBC Two gave the go ahead for the show to go into production in August 2009 with the first episode airing in September 2010. Whites aired for six episodes in 2010. On 1 March 2011 Davies announced that the BBC would not be renewing Whites for another series.

== Plot ==
After the beginnings of a seemingly promising career, Roland White (Alan Davies) is executive chef at the White House hotel and well past his prime. He deals with his stuttered career by leaving much of the day to day difficulties of running the restaurant to his best friend and sous-chef Bib (Darren Boyd) and his restaurant manager Caroline (Katherine Parkinson). They try to cope with waitress Kiki (Isy Suttie), ambitious apprentice chef Skoose (Stephen Wight) and the hotel owner Celia (Maggie Steed).

== Production ==
Co-writer Matt King used his experiences working in restaurants to form the basis for Whites. "Whites is totally based on Hanbury Manor, where I worked. It’s a facsimile. Roland is a composite of several chefs I know who can’t be bothered any more. They’ve kind of missed the boat, missed out on Michelin stars and cruise along." King and Oliver Lansley tried to follow the lead of shows like Entourage and 30 Rock in writing Whites. In order to prepare for their roles, the cast trained under the chefs at Jamie Oliver's restaurant Fifteen. For her role as Kiki, Isy Suttie learned to play the trumpet.

Speaking on his Twitter feed on 1 March 2011, Alan Davies confirmed that Whites would not be returning for a second series. The BBC had elected to cancel the series as it cost £3 million ($4.8 million) for one series. Fans launched an unsuccessful "Bring Back Whites" campaign in response to the show's cancellation. Davies later complained to The Daily Telegraph that he "got an email from someone I’d never met" informing him of the decision to cancel the show.

== Cast ==
- Alan Davies as Roland White, the executive chef
- Darren Boyd as Bib, Roland's long-suffering sous-chef
- Katherine Parkinson as Caroline, the restaurant manager and maître d'hôtel
- Stephen Wight as Skoose, an unpleasant apprentice chef with ambitions for Bib's job
- Isy Suttie as Kiki, a scatty waitress
- Maggie Steed as Celia, the hotel owner
- Amit Shah as Axel, a cook

== Episodes ==
No.	Title	Directed by	Original release date
1	"Episode 1"	David Kerr	28 September 2010
Roland is neglecting the kitchen, writing a cookery book that no one has asked for. Meanwhile, Caroline and Bib are feeling the pressure. Hearing that a publisher is coming to dine with Celia, Roland determines to impress them with his culinary skills. He hires an apprentice, Skoose, to help out, but Bib finds he is going to be trouble.
2	"Episode 2"	David Kerr	5 October 2010
When the hotel gets a surprise visit from three-time Michelin star winner Shay Marshall (Kevin Bishop), Roland allows Bib to design a new menu that can compete with Marshall's exceptionally modern cuisine. But it turns out Shay and Roland have met before, and under very particular circumstances.
3	"Episode 3"	David Kerr	12 October 2010
There is a car show at the hotel and Bib needs a way to transport his sperm to a fertility clinic down the road, with his impatient wife Sarah waiting. Roland meets a beautiful woman named Allison who shows interest in him, and Caroline forms an attitude about it.
4	"Episode 4"	David Kerr	18 October 2010
A Health and Safety inspector visits the hotel, but unlike the previous inspector, she does not accept bribes. After Caroline tells Roland her father has Parkinson's and that it is National Parkinson's Day, Roland claims Bib is his sickly brother in order to keep the kitchen from being shut down.
5	"Episode 5"	David Kerr	26 October 2010
Roland neglects the kitchen in order to appear on a TV show, which he believes will springboard his career as a celebrity chef. He selects Skoose as his on-screen sous-chef, upsetting Bib. Bib is commended for his cooking by an Australian CEO who shows interest in hiring Bib as head-chef at his Australian restaurant. Roland attempts to sabotage this but only proves to expose his own jealousy and cruelty towards Bib whilst simultaneously jeopardizing his own TV career.
6	"Episode 6"	David Kerr	2 November 2010
Roland begins interviewing for the sous-chef position under Caroline's orders, and while he feels he needs time to move on, fills the position with a beautiful woman named Beatrice (Siwan Morris) before Bib's unpronounced return. After having not been given the position himself, Skoose alienates everyone and later sees that effect as he looks jealously on Kiki and another man; and Caroline deals with romance problems of her own.

== Reception ==
Reviews of the series have been mixed to positive. The Guardian wrote a generally positive review, stating the show is "gentle, subtly played, often funny and quite promising." Metro UK wrote the show didn't entertain as well as Gordon Ramsay, saying "The problem with doing a comedy about chefs and restaurants is that the real thing does it so much better."

Whites had 2.37 million viewers for its debut episode on 28 September 2010. The finale, which aired on 2 November 2010, attracted 1.58 million viewers. Since the ratings were above average, The British Comedy Guide speculated that "the show is a casualty of the BBC Comedy department having to make spending cuts".

== Theme music ==
The opening and closing music is "Song for the Dead" by Alexander Wolfe.

== U.S. adaptation ==
In October 2018, it was announced that Matt Tarses and Will Arnett were developing a new Whites series for NBC, based on the UK format, through Sony Pictures Television. Tarses will write the potential series and executive produce alongside Arnett, Marc Forman, Peter Principato, and the original series' creators Oliver Lansley and Matt King.
