= The Thin Blue Line (British TV series) =

British sitcom (1995–1996)

- Genre: Sitcom; Police comedy
- Created by: Ben Elton
- Written by: Ben Elton
- Directed by: John Birkin
- Starring: Rowan Atkinson; James Dreyfus; Mina Anwar; Rudolph Walker; Serena Evans; David Haig; Kevin Allen; Mark Addy
- Composer: Howard Goodall
- Country of origin: United Kingdom
- Original language: English
- No. of series: 2
- No. of episodes: 14

Production
- Executive producer: Peter Bennett-Jones
- Producers: Geoffrey Perkins; Ben Elton
- Editors: Graham Hutchings; Steve Tempia; Charlie Fawcett
- Running time: 30 minutes
- Production company: Tiger Aspect Productions

Original release
- Network: BBC1
- Release: 13 November 1995 – 23 December 1996

The Thin Blue Line is a British sitcom which aired on BBC1 from 1995 to 1996. It was created and written by Ben Elton, and starred Rowan Atkinson. It was ranked number 34 in a poll for Britain's Best Sitcom. In September 2021, the series became available on BBC iPlayer.

The series is set in a police station in the fictional English town of Gasforth. The show sees the uniformed squad, led by Inspector Raymond Fowler (Atkinson), and the CID, led by Detective Inspector Derek Grim (David Haig), locking horns over similar, or even the same, issues while having conflicting views or working methods. Generally, the uniformed section triumphs over the detectives, although not without their own foibles. Other main characters are Sergeant Patricia Dawkins (Serena Evans), Constable Kevin Goody (James Dreyfus), Constable Maggie Habib (Mina Anwar), Constable Frank Gladstone (Rudolph Walker), Detective Constable Robert Kray (Kevin Allen), and Detective Constable Gary Boyle (Mark Addy). In addition to the main characters, other PCs and staff are visible in the background, though they generally have no speaking parts.

== Cast and characters ==
- Rowan Atkinson as Inspector Raymond Fowler, an old-fashioned, by-the-book policeman whose lack of interest in sex annoys his live-in girlfriend of ten years, Sergeant Dawkins. He has a son, Bill, from a previous marriage.
- Serena Evans as Sergeant Patricia Dawkins, a desk sergeant. She is Inspector Fowler's long-suffering partner and is forever on a quest for more sexual attention from him, who is usually reluctant to oblige. Despite her frustration and anger, she loves Fowler devotedly and dreams of marrying him and having a child.
- David Haig as Detective Inspector Derek Grim, the head of the CID unit at Gasforth Police Station. In reference to a common trope in police dramas and procedurals, his attitude is that CID are superior to the uniformed police. He has been married for twenty years to Tina, with whom he has an intense love-hate relationship. Their son, Darren, was arrested in one episode. In series one, Grim's relationship with Fowler is almost entirely antagonistic, but in series two, he does sometimes confide in Fowler about his frustrations with Tina.
- James Dreyfus as Constable Kevin Goody, who is perhaps the least complex of the officers. Profoundly unintelligent and oblivious to the obvious, he has very little idea of what being a police officer entails. Although his character is very camp, he is infatuated with Constable Habib.
- Mina Anwar as Constable Maggie Habib, a female officer of South Asian descent, who was raised in Accrington. Habib is generally the straight man in Fowler's uniformed branch, and usually the most effective officer in the team despite fighting off Kevin’s advances.
- Rudolph Walker as Constable Frank Gladstone, a Trinidad-origin constable near retirement. Gladstone has been a PC all his adult life, as was his father, and is enjoying his career winding down. He has something of an obsession with Gloria Hunniford.
- Kevin Allen as Detective Constable Robert Kray (series 1), an officer in Grim's CID unit. He is a very laddish cop, intelligent, cynical and pragmatic.
- Mark Addy as Detective Constable Gary Boyle (series 2), Kray's replacement in the second series. Like Kray, he is intelligent, cynical, pragmatic, very laddish and likes being a police officer for the associated perks.

Many notable actors made guest appearances and these include writer of the series himself Ben Elton, Stephen Fry, Stephen Moore, Melvyn Hayes, Trevor Peacock, Owen Teale, Colin McFarlane, Alan Cox, Alexander Armstrong, Nicola Stapleton, Perry Fenwick, Walter Sparrow, Geoffrey Chater, Lucy Robinson, Gabrielle Blunt and Rupert Vansittart.

== Series overview ==
Series	Episodes	Originally released	
Series	Episodes	First released	Last released
1	7	13 November 1995	26 December 1995
2	7	14 November 1996	23 December 1996

== Episodes ==
=== Series 1 (1995) ===
Episodes were broadcast at 20:30 on Mondays on BBC1.

No. overall	No. in series	Title	Directed by	Written by	Original release date
1	1	"The Queen's Birthday Present"	John Birkin	Ben Elton	13 November 1995
Inspector Fowler and Sergeant Dawkins should be celebrating their tenth anniversary together, but the Queen's official birthday and Fowler's complete remissness puts a spanner in the works.
2	2	"Fire and Terror"	John Birkin	Ben Elton	20 November 1995
Constable Habib falls in love with a fireman and PC Goody is jealous. DI Grim is onto "a big case" while Inspector Fowler is constantly plagued by a hoaxer.
3	3	"Honey Trap"	John Birkin	Ben Elton	27 November 1995
Dawkins is furiously jealous of Fowler's admiration for Habib, though mistakenly. While Fowler is preparing his team for the pub quiz, Grim has borrowed his star player, PC Habib. Can PC Goody take her place? And what will she look like in a miniskirt and will she succeed in nabbing the man Grim wants?
4	4	"Rag Week"	John Birkin	Ben Elton	4 December 1995
The local college students get completely out of hand during their rag week. Meanwhile, Detective Inspector Grim is in a good mood when he has got a real life bank raid to deal with.
5	5	"Night Shift"	John Birkin	Ben Elton	11 December 1995
Fowler reluctantly agrees to let his son Bill stay with him and Patricia for a few days. Patricia, unsatisfied and frustrated with Raymond, takes their matter to a sex therapist. Meanwhile, Grim is working with Scotland Yard against organised crime — and Fowler is most definitely NOT jealous.
6	6	"Kids Today"	John Birkin	Ben Elton	18 December 1995
Fowler leads a camping trip for young offenders, but Grim plans a "short sharp shock". Guest starring Stephen Fry.
7	7	"Yuletide Spirit"	John Birkin	Ben Elton	26 December 1995
Grim is on the trail of some dangerous carol singers, and Goody proves that giving Christmas presents at work can be a bad idea.

=== Series 2 (1996) ===
Episodes were broadcast between 21:30-21:40 on Thursdays on BBC1 apart from the final episode which aired on a Monday.

No. overall	No. in series	Title	Directed by	Written by	Original release date
8	1	"Court in the Act"	John Birkin	Ben Elton	14 November 1996
Inspector Fowler prepares his force for the rigours of cross-examination in court, and Constable Goody tries out a fetching new uniform.
9	2	"Ism Ism Ism"	John Birkin	Ben Elton	21 November 1996
The Mayoress informs Fowler that an illegal asylum seeker has taken refuge in the town. Grim meanwhile attempts to join a secret lodge.
10	3	"Fly on the Wall"	John Birkin	Ben Elton	28 November 1996
A television crew come to Gasforth to make a documentary about policing "in the raw".
11	4	"Alternative Culture"	John Birkin	Ben Elton	5 December 1996
Grim declares war on drugs. Meanwhile, a plumbing crisis at the station means the women have to share the men's locker room.
12	5	"Come on You Blues"	John Birkin	Ben Elton	12 December 1996
When Gasforth Football Club are drawn against Chelsea in the third round of the FA Cup, Grim looks forward to tackling some proper football hooligans.
13	6	"Road Rage"	John Birkin	Ben Elton	19 December 1996
Gasforth's new bypass causes headaches for Inspector Fowler when his partner Patricia joins the road protestors.
14	7	"The Green Eyed Monster"	John Birkin	Ben Elton	23 December 1996
Fowler thinks it is his turn for promotion. When Grim says the committee focus on married officers, Fowler decides to propose to Patricia.

== Development ==
Creator and writer Ben Elton is a fan of Dad's Army, and many of the characters were influenced by the show. Fowler's relationship with Grim is very similar to that of Captain Mainwaring to Warden Hodges, in that they are both on the same side yet enemies. Also, Constable Goody is rather like Private Pike in being a "stupid boy" who often irritates Fowler. Constable Gladstone's habit of interrupting a briefing with a story about life in Trinidad is similar to Lance Corporal Jones's penchant for reminiscing about Sudan during Captain Mainwaring's speeches. Other references include in the episode "Rag Week", when Fowler is briefly seen walking out of a shop called "Mainwaring's". Elton has appeared in the programme himself, as a homeless man in the Christmas special episode "Yuletide Spirit". In the first series, the 'wanted' poster behind Fowler's desk in the briefing room is an E-FIT of Elton.

== Home media ==
Both series have been released on DVD in the United Kingdom (Region 2) by Vision Video Ltd. The Thin Blue Line is available in Region 1 (North America), having been released by BBC Warner. Episodes in the first series were not in broadcast order on both Region 1 and 2 DVDs. The Series 2 episodes in the Region 1 DVD are cut to fit about 30-minute runtime. The Region 1 release has English closed captions. The UK Region 2 does not have any subtitles. It was also released on DVD in Region 4 by Umbrella Entertainment.

== Other sources ==
- Mark Lewisohn, "Radio Times Guide to TV Comedy", BBC Worldwide Ltd, 2003
