= Flack (TV series) =

- Genre: Comedy drama
- Created by: Oliver Lansley
- Written by: Oliver Lansley
- Directed by: Peter Cattaneo; George Kane
- Starring: Anna Paquin; Sophie Okonedo; Genevieve Angelson; Lydia Wilson; Rebecca Benson; Arinze Kene; Marc Warren; Rufus Jones; Andrew Leung
- Country of origin: United Kingdom
- Original language: English
- No. of series: 2
- No. of episodes: 12

Production
- Executive producers: Anna Paquin; Cerise Hallam Larkin; Stephen Moyer; Mark Larkin; Jimmy Mulville; Helen Williams
- Producer: Oliver Lansley
- Production locations: London, United Kingdom
- Running time: 50 minutes
- Production companies: CASM Films; Hat Trick Productions

Original release
- Network: UK: W; US: Pop (series 1); Amazon Prime Video (series 2)
- Release: 21 February 2019 – 18 May 2020

Flack is a British comedy drama television series, comprising two series of six episodes each, in 2019 and 2020. It stars Anna Paquin as Robyn, an American public relations executive in London who must clean up the messes caused by her clients while her own personal life is in disarray.

== Premise ==
Robyn (Paquin), an American PR executive living in London, must figure out how to make the best of bad situations and somehow manage to get out unscathed, clearing up the monumental messes caused by her hapless and selfish clients. Although she is utterly in command of her job, her personal life is spinning out of control.

== Cast ==
=== Main ===
- Anna Paquin as Robyn, an American publicist living and working in London.
- Sophie Okonedo as Caroline, Head of Mills Paulson
- Genevieve Angelson as Ruth, Robyn's sister.
- Lydia Wilson as Eve, Robyn's best friend and colleague at Mills Paulson.
- Rebecca Benson as Melody, an intern at Mills Paulson.
- Arinze Kene as Sam, a nurse and Robyn's boyfriend.
- Marc Warren as Tom, a ballet dancer.
- Rufus Jones as Mark, Ruth's husband.
- Andrew Leung as Craig, an IT worker at Mills Paulson

=== Guest ===
- Bradley Whitford as Calvin Cooper, a veteran director who Robyn reports for child pornography possession
- Max Beesley as Anthony Henderson, a celebrity chef embroiled in several cheating scandals
- Alan Davies as Dan Proctor, a stand-up comedian filmed making a transphobic outburst after being heckled during his routine
- Rebecca Root as Allie Gregs, a transgender stand-up comedian who became the focus of a transphobic outburst from Dan Proctor
- Amanda Abbington as Alexa, an actress who baselessly MeTooed a renowned nature presenter and environmentalist to advance her own career
- Katherine Kelly as Brooke Love-Wells, a model fronting an anti-ageist advertising campaign photographed with scarring from cosmetic surgery
- Sam Neill as Duncan Paulson, Caroline's ex-husband and the co-founder of Mills Paulson
- Daniel Dae Kim as Gabriel Cole, an electric aircraft innovator whom Eve briefly dates.
- Rebecca Scroggs as Abigail Reese, an entertainment reporter and one of Robyn's former flames
- Dinita Gohil as Narinda
- Toby-Alexander Smith as Terry
- Aude des Pallieres as Sofi Adjani, a temperamental fashion model who assaulted a club patron unprovoked
- John Askew as Darren Barron, a Formula 1 driver forced to lie about being infertile after his wife cheated on him with basketball player Kadell James
- Sophia La Porter as Roxy Barron, the wife of Darren Barron whose affair with Kadell James resulted in her becoming pregnant

== Episodes ==
Series	Episodes	Originally released	
Series	Episodes	First released	Last released
1	6	21 February 2019	28 March 2019
2	6	13 April 2020	18 May 2020

=== Series 1 (2019) ===
No. overall	No. in season	Title	Directed by	Written by	Original release date	U.K./U.S. viewers
1	1	"Anthony"	Peter Cattaneo	Oliver Lansley	21 February 2019	370,000 (U.K.)
After resolving a mid-night crisis for one of her clients, Robyn wakes up at her sister Ruth's house and they go to a bridge to commemorate the 1-year anniversary of their mother's suicide. Once at work, Robyn learns she must deal with Anthony Henderson, a family friendly TV chef popular with women across the country, and high-profile client, who is in danger of being outed by a mistress with pictures. Anthony gets Robyn up to a hotel room, tries to seduce her, but she's having none of it; then she has sex with him anyway. Meanwhile, Robyn's new intern, Melody, calls Anthony's wife to confirm the cover story Robyn has devised, tipping her off that her husband has had another affair. Robyn sneaks into Anthony's house and works out a deal with his wife. On her way home that evening, Robyn encounters a new mother who is overwhelmed and frustrated with motherhood. Robyn confides in her about her mother's suicide and her fears about the future. At home, we learn that Robyn has a loving boyfriend who is under the impression that they are both committed to try to conceive a child. In the bathroom, she takes her birth control pill and does a line of coke.
2	2	"Summer"	Peter Cattaneo	Oliver Lansley	28 February 2019	45,000 (U.S.); 307,000 (U.K.)
Gathering at Robyn and Sam's place for dinner, Ruth and her husband, Mark, support Robyn's return to Narcotics Anonymous, prompting Robyn to hide in the bathroom and trash the cocaine she'd stashed in her bag. When the men step outside, Robyn admits that she's going to NA "for him, not me. As long as he's happy." The next morning, Robyn tells her colleague, Eve, that "she's doing it for real this time. It's time to grow up." Keeping with that theme, the team meets to devise a plan for their teen-age client, Summer, who is about to be dropped by her record company and needs a strategy to stay in the spotlight. Together with Summer's mom-ager, they decide: lesbian sex tape. During a break, Mark shows up, telling Robyn he's been hiding from Ruth that he's been out of work for three months. Robyn tells him he has a month to tell Ruth before she does, and then enlists him to use his computer skills to distribute Summer's soon-to-be-made tape. As Robyn is privately discussing the shoot with Summer, she learns that Summer is a virgin and is scared. She sends Melody and Eve to find a suitable replacement from the local porn industry, but they are unsuccessful. The mom-ager is unhappy and wants to coerce Summer to comply; Robyn refuses, and Summer's mother steps in to be the body double. Ruth, who was suspicious that Mark was keeping something from her, catches him uploading Summer's tape, and both Robyn and Mark play it off as a pornography addiction, rather than telling Ruth the truth. Robyn takes a pregnancy test that comes up negative. Sam finds the empty package in the garbage and is disappointed to learn Robyn is not pregnant, so she reconfirms her commitment to having a baby. Later, she sneaks out to take another birth control pill.
3	3	"Dan"	Peter Cattaneo	Oliver Lansley	7 March 2019	22,000 (U.S.); 282,000 (U.K.)
Robyn has to get Dan, an entitled stand-up comedian, out of a hole after he is accused by a transgender comedian of being transphobic.
4	4	"Brooke"	George Kane	Oliver Lansley	14 March 2019	52,000 (U.S.); 282,000 (U.K.)
Robyn has to come to the aid of Brooke, the founder of an organic cosmetics company, after Brooke is photographed bandaged and bruised after recovering from a face-lift. After Robyn encourages Brooke's husband, a mild-mannered teacher, to falsely admit to assaulting her and read an apologetic statement to the press, Brooke is pressured into reporting him to the police due to her advocacy against domestic abuse. Ruth discovers her husband’s secret, which Robyn gets pulled within.
5	5	"Calvin"	George Kane	Oliver Lansley	21 March 2019	64,000 (U.S.); 242,000 (U.K.)
Robyn joins a client on an international flight. In this episode, it is revealed that the police have found incriminating content on his laptop. As Robyn races to make the problem vanish before the plane lands, she gets into trouble with the flight staff and runs into an old acquaintance. Upon landing, with a rough descent, her client checks his messages to state that it was a false alarm. Robyn alerts the authorities anonymously through her network.
6	6	"Patrick"	George Kane	Oliver Lansley	28 March 2019	36,000 (U.S.); 254,000 (U.K.)
Robyn must retrieve soccer star Patrick Andrews from a hardcore fetish club on the day he's getting married. At the wedding itself, she devises a plan to assist another soccer player's visibility by having him come out as homosexual, even though he is straight. Meanwhile her own life unravels.

=== Series 2 (2020) ===
No. overall	No. in season	Title	Directed by	Written by	Original release date	U.K. viewers
7	1	"Sofi"	Alicia MacDonald	Oliver Lansley	13 April 2020	218,000
8	2	"Brand Barron"	Alicia MacDonald	Oliver Lansley	20 April 2020	127,000
9	3	"Clara"	Alicia MacDonald	Oliver Lansley	27 April 2020	165,000
10	4	"Duncan"	Oliver Lansley	Oliver Lansley	4 May 2020	231,000
11	5	"Alexa"	Stephen Moyer	Oliver Lansley	11 May 2020	286,000
12	6	"Danny & Deepak"	Stephen Moyer	Oliver Lansley	18 May 2020	270,000

== Release ==
The first season, starring Anna Paquin, premiered on 21 February 2019.

On 2 August 2019, the series was renewed for a second season. In the UK, the show's website listed the second season as scheduled to run on W that March, before being changed to "Coming Soon". The second season premiered in the UK on 13 April 2020, on W.

The second season was scheduled to premiere on Pop in the U.S. on 13 March 2020, but was removed from the schedule after cutbacks by parent company ViacomCBS. In late March 2020, the first season was made available through the video on demand platforms of Pop's sister network Showtime in the United States, though a confirmation of the network airing the second season has not been made. In June 2020, it was announced that the series would move to Amazon Prime Video for its second season. Series 2 became available for streaming on Prime Video on 10 June 2021.

== Reception ==
On the review aggregator website Rotten Tomatoes, the series holds an approval rating of 73% with an average rating of 6.1/10, based on 26 reviews. The website's critical consensus reads, "Audiences looking for an arsenic cookie of a series may cut Flack some slack, but its cynical take on publicity is exacerbated by hyperbolically unpleasant, underdeveloped characters." Metacritic, which uses a weighted average, assigned the series a score of 58 out of 100, based on 13 critics, indicating "mixed or average reviews".
