= So Awkward =

British television sitcom

- Genre: Sitcom
- Created by: Julie Bower
- Written by: Julie Bower; Mark Oswin; Bede Blake; Matt Brito; Anthony McMurray
- Directed by: Rebecca Rycroft; Jordan Hogg; Ian Curtis
- Starring: Cleo Demetriou; Emily Burnett; Sophia Dall'Aglio; Ameerah Falzon-Ojo; Jamie Flatters; Archie Lyndhurst; Alex Carter; Carla Mendonça; Clive Rowe; Vicky Hall; Susan Earl; Kay Purcell; Rosie Boore; Fisher Costello-Rose; Samuel Small; Raif Clarke; Gemma Paige North; Nethra Tilakumara
- Composer: Samuel Karl Bohn
- Country of origin: United Kingdom
- Original language: English
- No. of series: 6 (main show); 1 (Still So Awkward); 2 (So Awkward Academy)
- No. of episodes: 114

Production
- Executive producers: Alan Marke; Jim Reid; Sue Nott; Chris Rose
- Producer: Sally Martin
- Editors: Justin James; Lindsey Dillon-Massey
- Running time: 28 minutes
- Production company: Channel X

Original release
- Network: CBBC
- Release: 21 May 2015 – 22 October 2020
- Release: 26 July 2021 – present

So Awkward is a sitcom series on CBBC following the lives of a group of friends in secondary school. It stars Cleo Demetriou as Lily Hampton, Ameerah Falzon-Ojo and Emily Burnett (in series 6) as Jas (Jasmine) Salford, Sophia Dall'aglio as Martha Fitzgerald, Archie Lyndhurst as Ollie Coulton, Jamie Flatters as Matt (Matthew) Furnish, Samuel Small as Rob Edwards and Raif Clarke as Sid Bevan. The thirteen-episode first series began on 21 May 2015, and finished on 6 August 2015. Another thirteen-episode series began on 25 August 2016 and ended on 17 November 2016, followed by a thirteen-episode third series, which began on 31 August 2017, and ended on 23 November 2017.

Series 4 was first broadcast in August 2018 and Series 5 began airing September 2019, with Series 6 first shown on 6 August 2020. Episodes are typically available on BBC iPlayer ahead of the scheduled air date.

On 22 September 2020, Lyndhurst died from a brain haemorrhage, aged 19. He was the only child of the Only Fools and Horses actor Nicholas Lyndhurst.

A thirteen-part spin-off series titled Still So Awkward premiered on CBBC and BBC iPlayer on 27 July 2021. This series introduced new characters such as Maxim Ays as Seb (Sebastian) Faulks Smythe, Esmond Cole as Samson Rosling, Indigo Griffiths as Frankie Simpson, Arian Nik as Josh Cooper, Ellie Clayton as Claire Fox, Ali Kahn as Meg Watson and Steve Marsh as Steve Grinstead. The only characters to appear from the main series were Lily Hampton, Jeff Malone and Rufus Walpole.

In 2023, a feature-length special, So Awkward: Kids Camp was broadcast, featuring Lily as a summer camp leader and introducing a new group of children.

This was followed by a 12-episode series titled So Awkward Academy, in which Lily joins the new Cranmede Academy (previously Cranmede Upper School) as a teacher. The show began on the CBBC Channel on 15 February 2024. A second and final series began airing on the CBBC Channel on 10 February 2025.

== Cast and characters ==
Cast list of So Awkward
Actor	Character	Original Series						Still So Awkward	So Awkward: Kids Camp	So Awkward Academy	
Actor	Character	1	2	3	4	5	6	7	8	9	10
Cleo Demetriou	Lily Hampton	Main	Main	Main	Main	Main	Main	Main	Main	Main	Main
Ameerah Falzon-Ojo	Jasmine 'Jas' Salford	Main	Main	Main	Main	Main	—N/a	—N/a	—N/a	—N/a	—N/a
Emily Burnett	Jasmine 'Jas' Salford	—N/a	—N/a	—N/a	—N/a	—N/a	Main	—N/a	—N/a	—N/a	—N/a
Sophia Dall'aglio	Martha Fitzgerald	Main	Main	Main	Main	Main	Main	—N/a	—N/a	Guest	—N/a
Archie Lyndhurst	Oliver 'Ollie' Coulton	Main	Main	Main	Main	Main	Main	—N/a	—N/a	—N/a	—N/a
Jamie Flatters	Matthew 'Matt' Furnish	Main	Main	—N/a	—N/a	—N/a	—N/a	—N/a	—N/a	—N/a	—N/a
Susan Earl	Mrs Stephanie Griggs	Main	Main	Main	—N/a	—N/a	—N/a	—N/a	—N/a	—N/a	—N/a
Kay Purcell	Mrs Rennison	Main	Main	Main	—N/a	—N/a	—N/a	—N/a	—N/a	—N/a	—N/a
Clive Rowe	Mr Keith Salford	Main	Main	Main	Main	—N/a	—N/a	—N/a	—N/a	—N/a	—N/a
Carla Mendonça	Mrs Saskia Fitzgerald	Main	Main	Main	Main	—N/a	—N/a	—N/a	—N/a	—N/a	Guest
Vicky Hall	Mrs Fern Hampton	Main	Main	Main	Main	—N/a	—N/a	—N/a	—N/a	—N/a	—N/a
Alex Carter	Mr Jeff Malone	Recurring	Main	Main	Main	Main	Main	Main	Main	Main	Main
Charlie Nicholson	Rufus Walpole	Recurring	Recurring	Recurring	Recurring	Recurring	Recurring	Recurring	—N/a	—N/a	Guest
Flynn Horne	Jason Hampton	Recurring	Recurring	—N/a	—N/a	—N/a	—N/a	—N/a	—N/a	—N/a	—N/a
Lauren Taylor-Griffin	Natasha Jones	Recurring	Recurring	—N/a	—N/a	—N/a	—N/a	—N/a	—N/a	—N/a	—N/a
Bella Band	Jenny	Recurring	Recurring	Recurring	—N/a	—N/a	—N/a	—N/a	—N/a	—N/a	—N/a
Rosie Boore	Cassie	—N/a	Main	Main	—N/a	—N/a	—N/a	—N/a	—N/a	—N/a	—N/a
Fisher Costello-Rose	Maxwell	—N/a	Main	Main	—N/a	—N/a	—N/a	—N/a	—N/a	—N/a	—N/a
Manpreet Bambra	Jade	—N/a	Main	—N/a	—N/a	—N/a	—N/a	—N/a	—N/a	—N/a	—N/a
Kavern Batchelor	Alfie	—N/a	—N/a	Recurring	—N/a	—N/a	—N/a	—N/a	—N/a	—N/a	—N/a
Samuel Small	Rob Edwards	—N/a	—N/a	Main	Main	Main	—N/a	—N/a	—N/a	—N/a	—N/a
Laura Aikman	Ms Vicky Parfitt	—N/a	—N/a	Main	—N/a	—N/a	—N/a	—N/a	—N/a	—N/a	—N/a
Raif Clarke	Sid Bevan	—N/a	—N/a	—N/a	Main	Recurring	Main	—N/a	—N/a	—N/a	—N/a
Martin Trenaman	Ken	—N/a	—N/a	—N/a	Main	—N/a	—N/a	—N/a	—N/a	—N/a	—N/a
Nethra Tilakumara	Kat	—N/a	—N/a	—N/a	—N/a	Main	Main	—N/a	—N/a	—N/a	—N/a
Gemma Paige North	Lou	—N/a	—N/a	—N/a	—N/a	Main	—N/a	—N/a	—N/a	—N/a	—N/a
Danny Griffin	Hunter Phillips	—N/a	—N/a	—N/a	—N/a	Recurring	—N/a	—N/a	—N/a	—N/a	—N/a
Janice Connolly	Mazel	—N/a	—N/a	—N/a	—N/a	Guest	Main	—N/a	—N/a	—N/a	—N/a
Maxim Ays	Sebastian 'Seb' Faulks Smythe	—N/a	—N/a	—N/a	—N/a	—N/a	—N/a	Main	—N/a	—N/a	—N/a
Esmond Cole	Samson Rosling	—N/a	—N/a	—N/a	—N/a	—N/a	—N/a	Main	—N/a	—N/a	—N/a
Indigo Griffiths	Frankie Simpson	—N/a	—N/a	—N/a	—N/a	—N/a	—N/a	Main	—N/a	—N/a	—N/a
Arian Nik	Josh Cooper	—N/a	—N/a	—N/a	—N/a	—N/a	—N/a	Main	—N/a	—N/a	—N/a
Ellie Clayton	Claire Fox	—N/a	—N/a	—N/a	—N/a	—N/a	—N/a	Main	Main	Main	Main
Ali Kahn	Meg Watson	—N/a	—N/a	—N/a	—N/a	—N/a	—N/a	Main	—N/a	—N/a	—N/a
Steve Marsh	Steve Grimstead	—N/a	—N/a	—N/a	—N/a	—N/a	—N/a	Main	—N/a	—N/a	—N/a
Ella Kenion	Caroline	—N/a	—N/a	—N/a	—N/a	—N/a	—N/a	—N/a	Main	Main	Main
Faisal Dacosta	Dominic Bell	—N/a	—N/a	—N/a	—N/a	—N/a	—N/a	—N/a	Main	—N/a	—N/a
James Day	Jin Hathaway	—N/a	—N/a	—N/a	—N/a	—N/a	—N/a	—N/a	—N/a	Main	Main
Audrey Aherne-Conroy	Maddy Thompson	—N/a	—N/a	—N/a	—N/a	—N/a	—N/a	—N/a	Main	Main	Main
Jarlan Bogolubov	Luca Morris	—N/a	—N/a	—N/a	—N/a	—N/a	—N/a	—N/a	Main	Main	Main
Bodhi Rae Breathnach	Tam Molloy	—N/a	—N/a	—N/a	—N/a	—N/a	—N/a	—N/a	Main	Main	Main
Rosie Ekenna	Teyah Wilcox	—N/a	—N/a	—N/a	—N/a	—N/a	—N/a	—N/a	Main	Main	Main
Sean Gordon	Zak Small	—N/a	—N/a	—N/a	—N/a	—N/a	—N/a	—N/a	Main	Main	Main
Billy Hickey	Conan O'Flynn	—N/a	—N/a	—N/a	—N/a	—N/a	—N/a	—N/a	Main	Main	Main

== Episodes ==
Series	Episodes	Originally released	
Series	Episodes	First released	Last released
1	13	21 May 2015	6 August 2015
2	13	25 August 2016	17 November 2016
3	13	31 August 2017	23 November 2017
4	12	23 August 2018	8 November 2018
5	13	12 September 2019	26 December 2019
6	13	6 August 2020	22 October 2020
7	13	27 July 2021	18 October 2021
8	1	29 May 2023	29 May 2023
9	12	14 February 2024	21 March 2024
10	10	10 February 2025	11 March 2025

=== Series 1 (2015) ===
No. overall	No. in season	Title	Directed by	Written by	Original release date
1	1	"Parentology"	Rebecca Ryworth	Julie Bower	21 May 2015
Martha feels abandoned by her workaholic mother, so she tries to get into trouble at school to be noticed, with the help of Jas. Unfortunately, this is not as easy as it seems. When her mum realises that Martha is feeling abandoned she tries to fix it, but Martha realises that she would rather have her workaholic mother the way she was before. Meanwhile, Lily is tired of her mother knitting her embarrassing jumpers and asking her if she has a boyfriend. She gives up and pretends that Ollie is her boyfriend, with disastrous results. First appearances: Lily, Jas, Martha, Matt, Ollie, Mrs Griggs, Mrs Hampton, Mr Salford, Mrs Fitzgerald
2	2	"Friendundancy"	Rebecca Ryworth	Julie Bower	21 May 2015
Mufti Day is arriving, and Lily doesn't want to wear one of Jas' quirky and weird outfits again. She runs into Natasha Jones, and accidentally suggests they all wear yellow, and ends up trying to change between Jas' and Natasha's outfits. She finally gives up when she forgets that Jas had transferred into her Art class the week before. Lily embraces Jas' zombie idea, and they end up setting a cool trend. Meanwhile Martha turns into a Goth, and Ollie decides that due to his fear of clothes he can't take the girls talking about clothes any more. Ollie gives the girls a 'friendundancy' form to sign.
3	3	"A Minus"	Jordan Hogg	Bede Blake	28 May 2015
Martha is mortified when she gets an A− on her test, so she revises so much that she begins to faint all over the place. Mrs. Griggs gets worried about her, so she decides to make Matt her 'fun' tutor. At first Martha is annoyed, but she soon learns that she can have fun, and she helps get Matt's grades up. Lily is jealous that Martha is spending so much with Matt, and Ollie is jealous that Martha is always with Matt, so Jas comes up with a plan to put them together. First Appearance: Mr Malone
4	4	"The Nox Factor"	Jordan Hogg	Julie Bower	4 June 2015
Martha's mum buys three tickets to a science talk hosted by a famous scientist, Dr. Nox. Lily and Jas both fancy him, so they compete at being a better friend so Martha will take them. In the end, Martha goes to ask Mrs. Griggs who she should pick. After failing to convince Martha to take her, Mrs. Griggs confiscates the tickets, but accidentally leaves them in a book which she later returns to the library. Meanwhile, Ollie wants to prove to everyone else that he is better than Dr. Nox, with Matt's help.
5	5	"Mr. Sicky Bear"	Jordan Hogg	Julie Bower	11 June 2015
Jas really wants to be Juliet in the play in assembly, but catches a cold. She accidentally passes the cold on to Martha and they both have to take a few days off. Martha stays at Jas' house. When she gets there though, she discovers Jas' house is a mess and spends ages cleaning. She also washes a teddy that Jas' dad uses to cheer up Jas when she is sick, which deeply upsets Jas and her dad. Meanwhile, because Jas is sick, Ollie really wants Lily to be Juliet in the play. However, she doesn't want to betray Jas even though Romeo is Matt Furnish, her crush.
6	6	"Love Machine"	Jordan Hogg	Bede Blake	18 June 2015
Lily is worried that she and Matt might not be compatible, so Jas adapts some plant compatibility software, which tells you how compatible you are with someone, or who your perfect match is from the entire school database. When Lily finds out that she and Matt are 97% compatible, she becomes worried and tries to figure out what the 3 percent is. When Jas enters Mrs. Griggs into the software, she is horrified to find out that the perfect match is her own father! She becomes worried when Mrs. Griggs gives her a letter to give to her dad, and hides it thinking that it was a date offer. However, when Lily has the same envelope, Jas finds out that it was just a request to help out at the school fair.
7	7	"Library vs. Tree"	Rebecca Ryworth	Mark Oswin	25 June 2015
Martha is campaigning to get a new library built, but when campaigning works, they find out that Jas' favourite tree would have to be cut down. A fierce battle between Martha and Jas and their parents ensues. When it is all over they find that plans for the library have been cancelled, but then find out that the tree will still be cut down for a new sports centre.
8	8	"Space Over"	Rebecca Ryworth	Julie Bower	2 July 2015
When Lily finds out that Matt is going out with a girl called Greta Masters, she becomes very upset. Jas organises a sleepover to cheer her up, but Martha is upset because a rare comet sighting is on the same night. She attempts to sneak Ollie into the attic of Lily's house so that they can see the comet.
9	9	"Fitzgerald vs Fitzgerald"	Jordan Hogg	Matt Brito	9 July 2015
When the Careers advisor suggests that Martha cannot become a human rights lawyer and that she should aim lower, she campaigns against her mother to bring back the schools vending machine because Jas cannot focus without the chocolate from it. She is nearly beaten, but proves that her mother didn't sign it. Because Martha's mother used her signature stamp, it wasn't a legal document.
10	10	"Rox My World"	Rebecca Rycroft	Bede Blake	16 July 2015
The girls have teamed up to enter a National Young Inventors competition. Lily and Martha fall out when Lily leaves the team to join Matt's team, and Martha replaces Lily with super-geek Roxanne Bunce. Roxanne has recently returned from a science exchange programme in France, and during that time she has undergone a major transformation - the super-geek has become super-cool, now calling herself Roxy. Matt Furnish falls head-over-heels for Roxy and comes to Lily for advice on how to impress her. Lily ends up giving the boy she likes lessons in how to chat up another girl. Meanwhile, Lily doesn't realise Jas in turn has been advising Roxy on how to secure Matt as a boyfriend.
11	11	"Good Girls"	Rebecca Rycroft	Mark Oswin	23 July 2015
When Lily loses her tie, she is encouraged unwittingly to 'steal' a tie by an older pupil whom she helped earlier. Meanwhile, Martha is called a snitch and denies this. Lily eventually finds her tie, and it turns out that Jas had taken it to use for her art project.
12	12	"Everyone Loves Clementine"	Rebecca Rycroftves	Matt Brito	30 July 2015
Lily borrows books from the library and leaves them on top of a car while she ties her shoe laces but the trouble starts when the car drives off with them. The books were due back that day and as Lily doesn't want to get banned from the library she makes up Clementine to say that Clementine lost the books so Jas tries to make Clementine as convincing as possible, but even more trouble lurks around the corner when Lily poses as Clementine for the writing competition because she forgot her library sticker. Clementine goes on to win the competition and at the ceremony, Lily accepts the award on her behalf, saying Clementine had exploded.
13	13	"Pouncing Tigers"	Jordan Hogg	Julie Bower	6 August 2015
Jas enters the girls into a charity basketball tournament in an effort to impress Jason, whom she has a crush on. Jas is crushed when she finds out that Jason is dating Sophia but ends up supporting the pair.

=== Series 2 (2016) ===
No. overall	No. in season	Title	Directed by	Written by	Original release date
14	1	"Dinner Date"	Ian Curtis	Anthony McMurray	25 August 2016
Lily invites Matt round for dinner, but things don't go as planned. Meanwhile Martha's obsession with emulating her idol makes Ollie jealous.
15	2	"PSHE Hee Hee"	Ian Curtis	Anthony McMurray	1 September 2016
Martha fears Mr Malone is not teaching PHSE well enough, so is worried that she will fail, while Lily is worried that she can't make Matt laugh.
16	3	"Locustium Insectium"	Ian Curtis	Julie Bower	8 September 2016
Jas looks after the school locusts and becomes devoted to them; Lily's attempts to cover up the locusts' escape from her rapidly get out of hand. Meanwhile, Martha and Ollie get preoccupied by their competing phone apps.
17	4	"The Kiss"	Ian Curtis	Lucy Guy	15 September 2016
Lily is determined to kiss Matt to prove they really are boyfriend and girlfriend, Martha and Ollie do a project on the transfer of germs, and Mr Malone suspects Mrs Griggs is flirting with him.
18	5	"Slang Gang"	Ian Curtis	Anthony MacMurray	22 September 2016
Martha and Ollie build a slang generator machine to help them come up with a cool slogan for the school graffiti wall. Meanwhile, Jas tries to track down the inventor of a new slang word going round the school and Lily wonders what's in Matt's diary. First Appearance: Cassie and Maxwell
19	6	"Girls & Boys"	Ian Curtis	Adam G Goodwin and Jonathan Parkyn	29 September 2016
The girls are mistaken for boys when dressing up for drama, and Lily keeps up the pretense in order to get closer to Matt. Ollie, without his contact lenses and trying to avoid wearing his old glasses, strikes up a friendship with Lily's alter ego 'Liam'.
20	7	"BFF"	Ian Curtis	Matt Brito	6 October 2016
When Mrs Hampton volunteers to help out at the upcoming food festival at school Lily worries that her mother is going to embarrass her, but when Jas tries to help it only leads to jealousy. Meanwhile, Martha becomes an accidental rebel and risks her place on the chess team.
21	8	"Race To The Bottom"	Jordan Hogg	Mark Oswin	13 October 2016
Martha and Lily desperately compete to avoid being top of the class as the reward event clashes with their plans.
22	9	"Party Clause"	Jordan Hogg	Julie Bower	20 October 2016
Traditionally, Martha and Jas have had a joint birthday party. When Jas and her dad suggest 'shaking it up' a bit this year, it leads to some arguments
23	10	"What Would Emmeline Do"	Jordan Hogg	Lucy Guy	27 October 2016
When a photo of Martha in the school prospectus is photoshopped, she is outraged. Mrs Griggs's latest obsession is underwater karate.
24	11	"The Salford Curse"	Jordan Hogg	Jonathan Parkyn and Adam G Goodwin	3 November 2016
Ollie and Martha feel that Cassie and Maxwell are trying to replace them as they are copying what Ollie and Martha do but better so they feel as they have to stop Cassie and Maxwell by sabotaging their lemonade stand, meanwhile Keith Salford is coaching the school hockey team and is relying on Jas to not get distracted and stop the other team from scoring but gets nervous when she believes she is under a curse . Lily is not a part of any of these things and feels as if she has just lost her friends so she tries to get them to notice how great friends they were and how it would be great if they were still friends.
25	12	"Eye Contact"	Jordan Hogg	Holly Phillips	10 November 2016
Mrs Griggs decides that a social skills class could be beneficial for certain pupils - including Martha, Rufus, Cassie and Maxwell.
26	13	"Totes Emosh"	Jordan Hogg	Julie Bower	17 November 2016
Martha is troubled when she's the only one who hasn't cried in assembly meaning she has to find a way to get the different feelings which make her cry if she wants to change the world, meanwhile Matt wants to audition for a school band with another popular girl which makes lily jealous. Matt doesn't get the place in the band but still wants to perform so he decides to perform in front of the school but when he loses his voice he needs Lily's help. Lily ends up singing the song which leads into Matt and Lily becoming a couple. Last Appearance: Matt

=== Series 3 (2017) ===
No. overall	No. in season	Title	Directed by	Written by	Original release date
27	1	"The Two Mrs. Hamptons"	Ian Curtis	Anthony MacMurray	31 August 2017
Lily realises she's turning out to be just like her mum. When she discovers her mum's school grades suddenly dropped from straight As to Cs and Ds the year she got her first boyfriend, Lily is desperate to avoid the same thing happening to her now she's officially going out with Rob. She tries different strategies - hanging out with younger kids Cassie and Maxwell to keep herself young and planning an educational Saturday afternoon out with Rob rather than going trainer shopping. None of her strategies work. Meanwhile Rufus, who has a big crush on Martha, is helping her with her conversational Spanish. When Rufus asks Martha out and she says no he figures she must already have a boyfriend and guesses it's Ollie. Uncomfortable with the situation, yet anxious still to keep Rufus as her tutor, Martha decides to pretend she is actually going out with Ollie. First Appearance: Rob
28	2	"Ms Perfect"	Ian Curtis	Anthony MacMurray	7 September 2017
History teacher Mr Malone is jealous when new geography teacher Ms Parfitt arrives on the scene and all the pupils are excited about how brilliant a teacher she is. When it's announced there is not enough money to fund both a geography and history field trip and the most popular trip will be the one that gets the funding, both teachers go head to head in a fierce competition to get their field trip chosen. Dirty tactics are employed by Mr Malone - he steals Ms Parfitt's coffee supply, so she's super-sleepy and unable to teach and tries to find out how she produces real smoke from her model volcano in class - almost getting himself blown up in the process. Meanwhile, Lily is complaining Rob is too 'boy' - she finds his boisterousness and burping gross and decides to give him a dose of his own medicine. It backfires - she eats disgustingly in his presence intending to shock him, but he doesn't even notice. By contrast, Ollie is sick of being treated by the others as one of the girls and Rob agrees to teach Ollie to be more 'boy'. First Appearance: Mrs Parfitt
29	3	"Science Chic"	George C Siougas	Anthony MacMurray	14 September 2017
A business studies competition is announced at school, and both Lily and Martha desperately want to be project manager. Lily thinks she would be the best candidate because the task is to organise a fashion show and she is more creative. Martha wants to be project manager so she gets to meet her business hero Sir Adam Salt. It is decided the role will go to the one who can come up with the best outfit design. Lily is confident she will win, but against the odds Martha wins with her 'lab coat' design. Martha gets carried away and turns into a true fashionista. Lily is upset that Martha has taken over her natural role, and Martha in turn is jealous when she discovers Lily and Ollie happily working on the spreadsheet. To add insult to injury, Martha's mother tries to muscle in and redesign the collection.Meanwhile, when Jas accidentally wrecks the shelves in Mrs Rennison's office, Mr Salford is roped into repairing them. Jas mistakenly thinks her dad is a DIY expert - he is actually hopeless but has never had the heart to tell Jas.
30	4	"A Room of Her Own"	Ian Curtis	Jonathan Parkyn	21 September 2017
Lily decides her bedroom is babyish and needs a makeover to reflect the fact she is now a sophisticated teen. So Lily and her mum decide to donate all her old toys to the upcoming school charity auction. Jas and Lily's mum secretly plan to redecorate her room as a surprise when Lily is out. Meanwhile in Life Lessons class Martha and Ollie volunteer to be parents to a new 'baby app', thinking it'll be an easy task. Utterly defeated by the baby app's constant crying and demands they palm 'baby' off on Cassie and Maxwell, who in turn are soon at their wits' end.
31	5	"Never the Bridsemaid, Never the Bride"	Ian Curtis	Lucy Guy	28 September 2017
Jas is asked to be a bridesmaid and is worried about being too clumsy to pull it off. Lily suggests staging a mock wedding so Jas can have a rehearsal - with herself and Rob as the bride and groom! Lily goes all Bridezilla. As she plans the big day she gets so carried away that she actually has no time for Rob and snubs him, just when he's ready to take their relationship to the next level and ask Lily on a romantic meal out. Meanwhile, Mr Salford has been asked to make a presentation to become the area youth hockey rep. Terrified of public speaking, he gets Mrs Griggs to help him. Mrs Griggs declares he must make a speech at the fake wedding.
32	6	"Fly Me to the Moon"	Ian Curtis	Mark Oswin	5 October 2017
No-one wants to be Jas' partner for Experiment Friday, as her science projects are always too crazy and ambitious - meaning she gets really low marks. However, first Rufus is roped in to 'Team Jas' and then Ollie and Rob. Jas calls Ollie and Rob to the art room and when they get there it's all in darkness, until the lights suddenly come on and Jas and Rufus announce from the control room next door 'You're going to the moon!'. She has transformed the art room into a spaceship to conduct an experiment into how teenage boys deal with being cooped up together on a long space voyage. Meanwhile, Lily and Martha have been paired with Cassie and Maxwell for Experiment Friday. Lily is fretting that she and Rob are obviously incompatible as he hates her favourite naturalist Steve Batchelor and Cassie and Maxwell decide to 'study' Lily as part of their science project, researching teen relationship issues.
33	7	"Hormone Horror"	George C Siougas	Lucy Guy	12 October 2017
Martha starts acting oddly, getting emotional and over-reacting to things. She's horrified to realise that her hormones are kicking in. Lily sympathises - she feels the same. Jas isn't feeling any effects from her hormones but, not wanting to feel left out, decides to fake it. Faced with two seemingly hormonal teenagers, Mrs Fitzgerald and Mr Salford join forces to address their problem. Deciding that exercise is a great antidote, they try to encourage Jas and Martha to join the new street dance class Ms Parfitt is running. Meanwhile, Mrs Griggs wants to be best friends with Ms Parfitt and thinks Ms Parfitt's street dance class is the perfect opportunity to impress her.
34	8	"Ultimate Bucket"	Ian Curtis	Lucy Guy	19 October 2017
Martha and Ollie throw Cassie and Maxwell off the maths team, desperate not to be outshone as they were last year by the lightning-fast buzzer technique of the younger pair. Outraged, Cassie and Maxwell vow to fight for their rightful places on the team. After what he considers a near-death experience stranded up a ladder, Alfie is determined to compile and complete a 'bucket list' before it's too late. Jas thinks she's helping him by encouraging him to do the scariest things she can think of, but poor Alfie becomes increasingly traumatised. Jas realises that she really needs to help him achieve his own personal goal - spending time with Martha! Meanwhile, Rob has to attend a History Catch-Up Club run by Mr Malone. Lily is frustrated, as she's hardly getting to see Rob at all and Ms Parfitt is jealous of the club's popularity. First Appearance: Alfie
35	9	"Anger Management"	George C Siougas	Julie Bower	26 October 2017
The school 3-legged fun run is coming up. Lily wants Rob to pair up with her, but Rob has plans to run with Jenny Jones, who is more athletic than Lily. This causes an argument - well, Lily gets angry. Rob's so easy-going he simply backtracks and agrees to partner with Lily. This makes Lily even more upset - why can't he just argue back? He's so chilled out it's like he doesn't care! Even Rob himself starts to worry that there's something wrong with him. Lily tells Cassie and Maxwell about Rob's inability to get angry and they decide to cure him. It's not an easy task and they have to resort to hypnosis. Meanwhile, there is competition amongst the parents about who should organise the fun run this year. When Jas creates an animated GIF of Mrs Fitzgerald, there is confusion and Mrs Fitzgerald and Mrs Hampton believe Mr Salford is trying to sabotage their plans for the fun run.
36	10	"Megasaurus"	George C Siougas	Julie Bower	2 November 2017
Lily worries that Jas is feeling left out. With Ollie and Martha practically a couple as well as her and Rob, she decides Jas needs a boyfriend. When she hears Rufus talking lovingly about fungal spores, Lily mistakenly thinks he is talking about Jas. She thinks they would make a great couple and decides to coach Jas in dating. Jas is happy enough to play along at first, especially as the practice sessions involve much food! When Lily insists they all go on a double date to watch a school chess match, both Jas and Rob pull out at the last minute and Lily is distraught - her own relationship seems to be on the rocks! Meanwhile, Mrs Griggs launches a mentoring scheme and Maxwell picks Ollie. At first Ollie is flattered, but he soon becomes fed up with Maxwell beating him at chess. Ollie can't admit he's forgotten how to perform his own legendary chess move, the 'Coulton Gambit', and to save face pretends he is letting Maxwell win each time. With Ollie and Maxwell spending so much time together, Martha and Cassie are feeling left out and, seeing an opportunity to split the boys up, they engineer it so Maxwell and Ollie are up against each other in the chess club opening rounds.
37	11	"Bug Brooch"	George C Siougas	Julia Kent	9 November 2017
Lily is delighted when Rob buys her a present for the first time - only it's a horrible bug-shaped brooch! Jas offers to break it accidentally-on-purpose so Lily won't have to wear it, but Rob catches Jas trying to smash it. Not wanting to drop Lily in it, Jas tells Rob she stole the brooch because she's in love with Rob herself and is so jealous of Lily. Rob believes this, but now Lily and Jas have to pretend to fall out and Jas has to pretend to be in love with an unnerved Rob! Meanwhile Mr Malone is in charge of putting together and burying a school time capsule. He happily palms off the responsibility onto Ollie and Martha, who are keen to ensure their legacy lives on for generations to come. There is competition, though, from Cassie and Maxwell.
38	12	"Cranmede Fever"	Ian Curtis	Adam G Goodwin & Jonathan Parkyn	16 November 2017
Martha and Ollie's team always comes first in the school's general knowledge quiz. Lily is determined that this year she and Jas will beat Martha and Ollie. However, both Lily and Martha get the flu. Maxwell and Cassie are roped in as replacement team members for Lily and Martha, who continue to give orders from their sick beds. Jas is confident that she won't get sick because of her dad's homemade 'Salford Special' health drink. Jas and Maxwell in turn try to play on Ollie's hypochondria to gain the upper hand. Meanwhile, Mrs Griggs has decided to perform a salsa dance before the quiz with a reluctant Mr Malone as her partner. When Mrs Griggs gets the flu Ms Parfitt has to step in. Last Appearance: Mrs Parfitt
39	13	"So Long, Farewell"	George C Siougas	Matt Brito	23 November 2017
Martha is offered a place in the elite 'Greatacre' school, facilitated and encouraged by Martha's mother Mrs Fitzgerald and her own 'Path to Greatness'. Martha announces to her class that she will be leaving at the end of term sending everyone into shock especially Ollie. Lily and Jas decide to treasure the last moments with Martha, but Ollie decides to break all contact from Martha to quickly adjust to this big change. Mrs Fitzgerald commences introducing Martha to the ways of Greatacre which become more and more un-appealing to Martha. With a lack of other intellectual peers, Ollie attempts to make friends with Cassie and Maxwell. Alfie is also grieving so Cassie and Maxwell offer to judge each of Ollie and Alfie's Martha memorial books to find the biggest griever. Ollie avoids Martha's attempt to work on their project to create a phone app controlled by blinking. Mrs Griggs is worried that when Martha leaves, the schools grade average will fall and they will lose the funding for the dance studio that she manipulated to be named after herself. So she goes to great lengths to hide from Martha so she won't have to sign the transfer forms. Ollie loses the memorial book competition, but Martha retrieves Ollie's discarded book and realises how much Ollie will miss her and that she will miss him too. Mrs F recalls the favouritism given to Belinda Watts while they were both at the school and she still resents it seeking some revenge. When she finds out that the Cranmede school's 'Watts' prize, named after her rival Belinda, won't have a chance to be renamed after Martha if she leaves, she has her doubts about approving Martha's transfer. Finally, both Martha and Mrs F decline the offer to transfer to Greatacre. Last Appearance: Cassie, Maxwell, Alfie, Mrs Griggs, Mrs Rennison

=== Series 4 (2018) ===
No. overall	No. in season	Title	Directed by	Written by	Original release date
40	1	"The Band"	Ian Curtis	Anthony MacMurray	23 August 2018
Ollie, Rob, Jas and Sid enter Battle of the Bands with tuneless Mr Malone! Lily wants her mum's boyfriend Ken to like her, and Jas tries to introduce boyfriend Sid to her dad. First Appearance: Sid, Ken
41	2	"Let's Talk About Love"	Ian Curtis	Lucy Guy	23 August 2018
Lily has a big announcement - she's going to tell Rob she loves him... but first she's going to build him a football stadium out of lollipop sticks. Easy (not easy)!
42	3	"Where There's A Will"	Ian Curtis	Adam G. Goodwin & Jonathan Parkyn	30 August 2018
On the day Martha asks Lily for the 7p she owes her, Lily inherits a lot of money. Determined to prove Martha is petty, Lily decides to share her wealth with everyone.
43	4	"Breaking Up"	Ian Curtis	Julia Kent	6 September 2018
Lily's gut instinct tells her that fellow pupil Carla fancies Rob. Rob denies this but Lily sets out to prove her gut instinct is correct with the help of Martha.
44	5	"Teenealogy"	George C. Siougas	Mark Oswin	13 September 2018
Lily's gut instinct tells her that fellow pupil Carla fancies Rob. Rob denies this but Lily sets out to prove her gut instinct is correct with the help of Martha.
45	6	"The Look and Love"	George C. Siougas	Lucy Guy	20 September 2018
Rob enters a modelling competition and Lily is determined he will win using 'the look'. Martha practises dating, only her lovestruck date Rufus doesn't know it's just pretend.
46	7	"Loyalty Points"	George C. Siougas	Adam G. Goodwin & Jonathan Parkyn	27 September 2018
Lily and Jas fake a falling-out to get Rob and Sid to stop arguing, while Ollie and Martha train Mr Malone to be a better teacher.
47	8	"Date Night"	Ian Curtis	Julie Bower	4 October 2018
Lily plans a perfect date night to celebrate her anniversary with Rob, but her mum and Ken might ruin everything. Meanwhile, Martha reluctantly agrees to a tech detox.
48	9	"Practice Makes Perfect"	George C. Siougas	Anthony MacMurray	11 October 2018
Lily, Martha and Ollie become prefects and the power goes to their heads, meaning Rob may not be able to play an important football match. Jas and Sid lead the resistance.
49	10	"Scary Movie"	Ian Curtis	Mark Oswin	18 October 2018
It's Halloween and Jas goes to extreme lengths to cure Lily's many fears before her scary party, while Ollie falls in love with new girl Em. Last Appearance: Mrs Hampton, Ken
50	11	"Three's Company, Four's a Crowd"	George C. Siougas	Matt Brito	25 October 2018
Martha and Ollie are confident they can win the McSherman Science Prize, but they have one tricky formula to work out - how to subtract Rob from their team without losing Lily.
51	12	"Inspiring Women of Tomorrow"	George C. Siougas	Lucy Guy	1 November 2018
The girls follow an app promising future success, but can they resist their weaknesses? Last Appearances: Mr Salford, Mrs Fitzgerald

=== Series 5 (2019) ===
No. overall	No. in season	Title	Directed by	Written by	Original release date
52	1	"Waitress Wars"	Vito Rocco	Anthony MacMurray	12 September 2019 (BBC iPlayer 12 September 2019)
Lily loves working at a cafe until Jas joins her and changes things to make it a really fun job for her. Martha is shocked and upset to learn Ollie has a girlfriend and feuds with her due to her jealously. Sid says he may leave Cranmede school which Jas is surprisingly fine with but Rob is really sad about and goes all cheesy with Sid about it. First Appearances: Lou and Kat Departed: Sid
53	2	"Awardatarian"	Bede Blake	Ian Curtis	19 September 2019 (BBC iPlayer 12 September 2019)
Martha and Ollie compete to win awards by teaching tech to ex-punk Jonny and chatty Mazel. Meanwhile as part of World Humanitarian Week, Mr Malone appoints Jas as a 'secret shopper' to identify who isn't following the rules and being nice to everyone. Lily, who is desperate to win the prize, is being driven mad due to consistent niceness and does whatever it takes to force Jas to admit that she is the secret shopper. Guest Appearance: Mazel
54	3	"Head Boy Hearts Girl"	Ian Curtis	Julia Kent	26 September 2019 (BBC iPlayer 19 September 2019)
Lily thinks that the Head Boy, Hunter has a crush on her. Lily develops a crush too but knows Rob is the right boy for her so she is instructed by Jas to be overly mean to Hunter instead. Martha and Kat compete for their choice to become a statue for 'women who changed the world week'. Hunter helps Martha get signatures due to his crush on her whilst Lily still believes that he likes her and wants to get in with her friends. Ollie avoids Martha and Kat as he does not want to be pressured into voting for one or the other as he will get hatred from the other, so he pretends that he has no opinion on their choices. Martha is co concerned that she is only getting votes because Hunter asks them, which is not what she stands for. First Appearance: Hunter
55	4	"Lou Dun It"	Ian Curtis	Julia Kent	3 October 2019 (BBC iPlayer 26 September 2019)
When Lou at the cafe organises a play including Mr Malone but without Lily, Lily rebels and tries to prove to her that she is a good actor. Meanwhile, Jas is speaking to Sid telepathically and Martha sets out to prove to her that telepathy doesn't exist and that she is not still going out with Sid. Ollie is afraid that Kat will be disappointed in his intellectual abilities due to his recent inabilities to solve murder-mysteries. Note: Sid returns for this episode
56	5	"No Pain No Gain"	Ian Curtis	Anthony MacMurray	10 October 2019 (BBC iPlayer 3 October 2019)
Rob tries to train Mr Malone as part of his PE A-Level module but Mr Malone just makes him play video games instead. Rob pretends to get injured and be on crutches so he doesn't have to play which results in Hunter coaching him instead and making him do PE for real. Rob continues to lie to Lily about being injured in order to continue to train her for his module as she would not have done it if it wasn't for his injury. Meanwhile, Jas sells useless sculptures at Mugshotz because 'the universe told her to do it' and has a bet with Lou regarding the sculptures.
57	6	"V Day"	Ian Curtis	Lucy Guy	17 October 2019 (BBC iPlayer 10 October 2019)
Valentines day is coming up and Martha and Ollie are strongly against it until Martha helps Ollie to plan an educational yet romantic evening with Kat. Lou bans anything to do with it from her cafe until she gets a valentine. Lily goes crazy about it but Rob is more interested in his football game. Jas tries to come up with gifts to give to send to Sid on Valentines day and Mr Malone and Hunter try to get dates, both of which backfire.
58	7	"Open Mice"	Ian Curtis	Lucy Guy	24 October 2019 (BBC iPlayer 17 October 2019)
Martha and Mr Malone join forces against Hunter and Ollie and Kat in a stand-up comedy competition run by Lou at the cafe. Meanwhile, Jas becomes friends with mice (Percival and Serena) located in the cafe, which threatens the evening going ahead and the possibilities of Lily receiving tips so she can buy a £99 cape. Lily and Jas team up to keep the mice a secret and not out and about. Martha uses her knowledge to help bring down Hunter but misenterprets why he is tongue tied around her.
59	8	"None of Your Business"	Ian Curtis	Adam G Goodwin & Jonathan Parkyn	31 October 2019 (BBC iPlayer 24 October 2019)
Ollie becomes manager for the day at Mugshotsz for the day, much to the pleasure of Lily and Jas who can finally add to the menu and wear homemade costumes. Mr Malone and Lou become trapped in the basement and by then, Lily and Jas become sick of Ollie and Kat's decisions. Lily and Jas go on strike but Ollie finds himself in a sticky situation when he cancelled the grocery order, has loads of customers due to yesterday's deal and is being judged by an anonymous "rate my cafe" reviewer.
60	9	"Never Meet Your Heroes"	Vito Rocco	Adam G Goodwin & Jonathan Parkyn	7 November 2019 (BBC iPlayer 31 October 2019)
Ollie and Rufus beat an unbeatable game and celebrity blogger and ex-Cranmede student Jam9T7 wants to manipulate the boys into telling him how they did it so he can live stream the reveal to his millions of followers. Meanwhile, Lily and Jas try to start up a vlog about the issue of plastics in the environment, causing Lily to lose track of the purpose and acts like she is a celebrity like Jam9T7. She tries to lie to the vlog about the use of plastics by Mugshotsz and Cranmede in order to gain fame. Ollie is influenced by Jam9T7's rep and leaves his team with Rufus and is manipulated by him.
61	10	"Radio PI"	Vito Rocco	Julie Bower	November 2019 (BBC iPlayer 2019)
Ollie agrees to host a radio show with Martha called Radio Pi but lies to Kat about it due to the tension between Kat and Martha. Martha is pleased to have Ollie back on side again. Ollie's lies about being in the studio to help Mr Malone write a song backfires when he actually has to make one with him. Rob helps as Lily is obsessed with the fact that they need a song to represent their relationship and Rob believes Mr Malone's song could do the trick. Martha is frustrated with the relationship talk so Radio PI is fully factual. Jas however creates a relationship show and becomes too popular within school to the point where she must stop being the agony aunt.
62	11	"Our Brilliant Careers"	Vito Rocco	Alison Hume	14 November 2019 (BBC iPlayer 2019)
The group spend a few days trailing work in their preferred careers. Lily is desperate to be an actor, however, much to her dismay, she must play the role of a peasant woman, Mary, when she dreamed of playing a role in royalty. In order to seem like a good actor, Lily adapts the role to suit her more. Ollie is pressured into trialling a career as a Marketing Executive by Kat and he strongly dislikes it due to lack of scientific methodology. Martha cannot choose between becoming a Surgeon, Finance Advisor or a University Lecturer so sets out to try all three in order to make her decision.
63	12	"Virtue and Virtuality"	Vito Rocco	Mark Oswin	21 November 2019 (BBC iPlayer 14 November 2019)
Lily get addicted to a virtual reality game which allows her to be everything she's not. She ends up developing a crush on virtual character Jack Stormhart. Lily finds out that Rob plays Jack and tries to get Rob in virtual reality to admit to her that he likes the virtual reality girl better than his actual girlfriend, both of which are Lily without him knowing. Ollie is forced to express his feelings due to Kat's concerns about where the relationship is going, with help from Rufus. Jas submits a thesis of Martha's to a competition to go to the Large Hadron Collider, of which she attends in the summer. Ollie realises that he has unresolved issues with Martha of which he must address. Jas worries that Sid has fallen out of love with her due to her being too random compared to his college friends. Returned: Sid
64	13	"All We Want for Christmas"	Vito Rocco	Mark Oswin	5 December 2019 (BBC iPlayer 21 November 2019)
Lily plans the perfect Christmas Eve lunch for Martha, Jas, Ollie, Rob and Sid. Martha has a new boyfriend, Swedish Gustav, who sends Martha into a giddy and happy mood, but leaves Ollie distressed due to his planning on asking Martha out at CERN over the summer. Gustav much different to how the group envisioned him and is horrible to the group, including Lily's party whilst on video call. Martha is upset at Lily's response to Gustav and is glad that she is leaving for Sweden to see her boyfriend. Sid upsets Jas by expressing his dislike to sleigh bells and presents, Jas's favourite aspects of Christmas. Lily and Rob are upset with each other after finding out neither of them like the presents they receive from each other, so they donate them to Sid's charity present box. Lou and Mr Malone secretly plan a Christmas Party, but Jas and Lily believe they are hooking up. Last Appearance: Rob, Lou and Ameerah Falzon-Ojo as Jas

=== Series 6 (2020) ===
No. overall	No. in season	Title	Directed by	Written by	Original release date
65	1	"Heads We Win"	Ian Curtis	Mark Oswin	6 August 2020 (BBC iPlayer 6 August 2020)
Martha and Ollie have finally accepted their romantic feelings for each other and are now a couple. When Rob leaves Lily she is determined to prove to Martha that she is just fine by running for head girl against her, proving she is a force to be reckoned with. Meanwhile, Sid attempts to sabotage the ‘repressive ideology’ in a number of ways, including uncovering a rule saying that head boy and head girl can neither be related nor in a relationship. This distresses Ollie seeing as he is already head boy. Martha and Ollie end up taking the jobs as head boy and girl but Martha decides to end their relationship to do so, dismaying Ollie. First Appearance: Emily Burnett as Jas
66	2	"Face Off"	Ian Curtis	Anthony MacMurray	6 August 2020 (BBC iPlayer 6 August 2020)
Kat becomes frustrated with Martha and Ollie’s high profile in the school and tries to eclipse them by being in Mr Malone’s film. Meanwhile, Lily and Jas help Ollie and Martha to spend time apart in order to suppress any romantic feelings they still have for one another.
67	3	"Travel Bug"	Ian Curtis	Lucy Guy	13 August 2020 (BBC iPlayer 13 August 2020)
Jas and Lily plan to go travelling together but soon discover that they don't share the same idea of a perfect holiday. Lily asks Martha and Ollie to help persuade Jas to back out.
68	4	"Possession Obsession"	Ian Curtis	Lucy Guy	20 August 2020 (BBC iPlayer 20 August 2020)
Mr Malone holds a mock trial to resolve a dispute Martha and Ollie are having over the ownership of Edison, a cuddly lightbulb they won together at a fairground hoopla, whilst Jas decides that she and Sid should give away all their stuff which doesn't turn out well for Sid.
69	5	"Mascots"	Jason Wingard	Mark Oswin	27 August 2020 (BBC iPlayer 27 August 2020)
Lily tries to convince her friends that she is a top model, Martha gets a job in Mugshotsz and Ollie tries to be cool like Sid.
70	6	"Deny And Deniability"	Ian Curtis	Adam G Goodwin & Jonathan Parkyn	3 September 2020 (BBC iPlayer 3 September 2020)
Lily's new boyfriend Bob is so like Rob that Martha and Ollie use science to prove Lily is not over Rob, which leads to a shocking discovery. Meanwhile, Mr Malone offers terrible advice to Jas.
71	7	"Do The Write Thing"	Lucy Guy	Jason Wingard	10 September 2020 (BBC iPlayer 10 September 2020)
Lily and Martha compete to be best friends with exchange student Kesia. Meanwhile, Ollie has to write his student thesis from memory and Mr Malone tries to write a novel.
72	8	"Singletonia"	Ian Curtis	Mark Oswin	17 September 2020 (BBC iPlayer 17 September 2020)
Lily’s friends are all coupled up and keep leaving her out, so she sets about trying to break up the happy couples. Meanwhile, Kat tries to teach Jas to be ruthless.
73	9	"Electronic Dance Martha"	Jason Wingard	Adan G Goodwin & Jonathan Parkyn	24 September 2020 (BBC iPlayer 24 September 2020)
When Martha and Kat use maths to create a dance track, they become overnight pop stars.
74	10	"So Lily"	Jason Wingard	Andrew Burrell	1 October 2020 (BBC iPlayer 1 October 2020)
Lily and Jas go a little crazy when Mazel changes Mugshotsz around and reveals that the café’s new online experience, cake cam, has 250,000 followers.
75	11	"Shaved by the Bell"	Ian Curtis	Julia Kent	8 October 2020 (BBC iPlayer 8 October 2020)
Nothing to see here, just another normal day at Cranmede: Sid has a crisis about getting his head shaved, Jas learns to ride a boiled egg and Mr Malone betrays ThunderBun.
76	12	"Academic Lily Speaking"	Alex Carter	Julia Kent	15 October 2020 (BBC iPlayer 15 October 2020)
Martha and Lily try to find each other boyfriends. Meanwhile, Ollie is stressed.
77	13	"Prom!"	Jason Wingard	Anthony MacMurray	22 October 2020 (BBC iPlayer 22 October 2020)
Lily is excited about the prom, but none of her friends want to go. Last Appearances: Jas, Martha, Ollie, Sid, Kat and Mazel Note: At the end of the episode in the original broadcast, Cleo Demetriou announced that a sequel series titled, "Still So Awkward" is currently in the works.
S01	S01	"Promtime TV"	Unknown	Unknown	22 October 2020 (BBC iPlayer 22 October 2020)
In a behind-the-scenes documentary, cast members Cleo Demetriou, Emily Burnett and Sophia Dall'aglio look back on the years they had together filming the show and express how grateful they are for the friends they made along the way.
