= Francis Lyndhurst =

English theatrical scenery painter, film producer and film director (1878–1952)

- Born: Lindhurst Francis Schmitz; 2 March 1878; Kensington, London, England
- Died: 31 May 1952 (aged 74); Chichester, Sussex, England
- Occupation(s): Theatrical scenery painter, film producer, film director
- Years active: 1914–1952
- Spouse: Dorothy Rogers (m. 1907)
- Children: 5
- Relatives: Nicholas Lyndhurst (grandson); Archie Lyndhurst (great-grandson)

Francis Leonard Lyndhurst (born Lindhurst Francis Schmitz; 2 March 1878 – 31 May 1952) was an English theatrical scenery painter, film producer and film director. He is known for setting up an early film studio at Shoreham-by-Sea, West Sussex.

== Early life ==
Lindhurst Francis Schmitz was born in Kensington, London, England on 2 March 1878. He was baptised, a son of Francis Henry Schmitz, a clerk from Paris, and his wife, Annie Maria (née Mower), at St Clement, Notting Hill in the Royal Borough of Kensington and Chelsea on 26 May 1878.

== Career ==
Lyndhurst's first films, beginning with The Showman's Dream in 1914, were made at Shoreham Fort, by his production company, Sealite, or Sunny South Film Company. He set up the Glasshouse Studio in a nearby, glass-sided, building, in 1915. The business failed and he returned to his former occupation of scenery painting.

Lyndhurst stored his films in a barn, which was destroyed by bombing during World War II. No copies of any of his films are known to survive.

Lyndhurst bought a farm, in order that his sons should avoid fighting in the Second World War. Later a portion of the land was used to build chalets and set up a holiday camp.

== Personal life ==
Schmitz married Dorothy Constance "Dora" Rogers in Brentford, Middlesex, in January 1907. They had five sons together: Francis Geoffrey Lyndhurst (né Schmitz; 1907–1996), John Bellas L Lyndhurst (né Schmitz; 1912–1992), Jim "James" Lyndhurst (né Schmitz; 1915–1958), Richard Alan Kenneth Lyndhurst (1916–2002), and Anthony Arthur Joseph "Joe" Lyndhurst (1924–2000).

On 18 February 1916, during the First World War, he legally changed his name from Lindhurst Francis Schmitz to Francis Leonard Lyndhurst, because of anti-German sentiment. In October 1916, he unsuccessfully sued a man, John Bull, for libel, for calling him "German", claiming it was the worst possible insult.

Lyndhurst and his wife purchased a piece of land in Lambeth, South London, in 1933. The couple later bought a farm.

Lyndhurst died at his home, Hundred Streddle Farm, in Chichester, Sussex, on 31 May 1952. He was 74. He was buried in Birdham on 4 June 1952. His widow died in Chichester on 2 April 1964, aged 76.

Lyndhurst is the grandfather of actor Nicholas Lyndhurst, who is best known for his role as Rodney Trotter in Only Fools and Horses, and the great-grandfather of Archie Lyndhurst, the late actor and designer, who was best known for his role as Oliver 'Ollie' Coulton in So Awkward.

== Credits ==
- Building a Chicken House
- Harnessing a Horse
- Moving a Piano
- Some Fun
- Study in Skarlit
- The Jockey
- The Showman's Dream
- Tincture of Iron
- White Washing a Ceiling
