= List of After You've Gone episodes =

The following is a list of episodes for the BBC One sitcom After You’ve Gone. It was created by My Family creator Fred Barron. The first episode aired on 12 January 2007, and the last on 21 December 2008. BBC One commissioned a fourth series and a third Christmas special for broadcast in 2009, but cancelled them in November 2008. All 25 episodes of the series were broadcast on Friday evenings, with most episodes airing at 8:30pm. All 25 episodes are 30 minutes long, with the exception of the 2007 and 2008 Christmas specials, which are both 45 minutes.

== Series overview ==
Series	Episodes	Originally released	
Series	Episodes	First released	Last released
1	7	12 January 2007	23 February 2007
2	9	7 September 2007	23 December 2007
3	9	14 September 2008	21 December 2008

== Episodes ==
=== Series 1 (2007) ===
No. overall	No. in series	Title	Written by	Original release date	Viewers (millions)
1	1	"Stuck in the Middle with You"	Fred Barron	12 January 2007	4.10
Ann (Samantha Spiro) decides to go to Africa for 8 weeks to help after a flood, so her former husband Jimmy agrees to move into the former marital home to look after their children. However, Diana also moves in as she has no trust in Jimmy. Jimmy gets annoyed when he discovers Ann has gone to Africa with her boss and boyfriend Dr. Howard Banks, then gets a parking ticket and finally gets home to discover that Molly, who has pulled a sickie, is nowhere to be seen. This makes Jimmy and Diana realise that Molly and Alex need both of them.
2	2	"Silence of the Clams"	Andrea Solomons	19 January 2007	4.32
Jimmy lets Molly and Alex have a party, but he has to make sure that Diana doesn't find out. Siobhan suggests that he takes Diana out to a restaurant on that evening. At the restaurant, Diana sees one of her colleagues Laurence, with whom she has been having an affair, with a young female, so she pretends that she and Jimmy are going out. Meanwhile, Alex turns the party into a fancy-dress party and while he has his eye on Wendy (Shana Swash), Molly fancies Josh (Robert Knox). However, the party ends when Diana goes into the house suspecting something has happened.
3	3	"Lock Back In Anger"	Fred Barron	26 January 2007	4.30
When Jimmy's van is stolen, Diana insists on new locks as his keys were in the van. However, Jimmy is hesitant. When he and Siobhan go to the house to introduce her to Molly and Alex, they discover no one is in and Diana has had the locks changed. Jimmy then decides to break in via the back, but the police are called and he is taken down to the police station. Diana, Molly and Alex then have to come back from the opera to identify him, and there they meet Siobhan.
4	4	"Ripped Off"	James Hendrie and Ian Brown	2 February 2007	4.73
Diana has lost the school timetables she had drawn up for the whole year and is frantically trying to redo them. When Jimmy gives her a second-hand laptop he has bought from Kev, she plans the timetables on it. However, Jimmy soon has to get rid of the laptop because the person who Kev got it from wants it back, so Diana loses all the information again. Meanwhile, Siobhan persuades Jimmy to allow her to practise her waxing skills on him and Alex wants a pair of terrapins.
5	5	"School of Hard Knocks"	James Hendrie and Ian Brown	9 February 2007	5.11
When Jimmy says to Diana he will make an arch in his house, he has to cancel his weekend in Brighton with Siobhan, but discovers she had made other plans as she knew he would cancel. Jimmy then constructs the arch with Alex's help, in an attempt to teach him to stick at things, after he gets a letter from Alex's school telling him he has potential but no attention span. Meanwhile, Diana tries to make Molly throw away a t-shirt that says "Slut Queen".
6	6	"Let's Get Quizzical"	Katie Douglas	16 February 2007	5.49
Jimmy and Kev lose for the tenth consecutive time in the pub quiz to Siobhan and her two friends. The next week Jimmy gets Diana to join his quiz team. They win after a tie-break question against Siobhan's team. However, when Diana later discovers her answer was wrong she goes to give the money back to Bobby at the pub. There she and Siobhan start talking. They then get drunk and spend the whole evening chatting to each other. Jimmy is annoyed by this and the following day he tries to stop them being friends, but ends up insulting Siobhan.
7	7	"Out of Africa"	Dan Tetsell	23 February 2007	5.23
Ann's partner Dr. Howard Banks (Alexander Armstrong) arrives from Africa on a brief visit to raise funds for the relief work. Jimmy instantly dislikes him, but the rest of the family like him. Howard tells Diana that he and Ann want Molly and Alex to go and live with them in Africa. Diana and Jimmy agree this can't happen, and while Jimmy is having an argument with Howard, Diana tells the children that Howard and Ann want them to live in Africa, and they both quickly dispel the idea. Meanwhile, Molly has got a job working at a chip shop but she hates it and soon wants to leave.

=== Series 2 (2007) ===
No. overall	No. in series	Title	Written by	Original release date	Viewers (millions)
8	1	"Web of Deceit"	James Hendrie and Ian Brown	7 September 2007	4.76
Diana, Molly and Alex return from a holiday in Africa but Jimmy forgets to pick them up from the airport and they return to a dirty house and Siobhan in Jimmy's bed. Molly is annoyed with Jimmy and Diana says the reason why is on Molly's blog, which Jimmy eventually reads. When he then tells Siobhan that the reason Molly is annoyed is that she does not like Siobhan sleeping in his bed, she goes round and talks to Molly. When Molly then works out that Diana and Jimmy have been reading her blog she writes on it that she is going to a rave in Hampshire to send them on a wild goose chase.
9	2	"Rose Tattoo"	Jim Armogida and Steve Armogida	14 September 2007	4.53
Jimmy accidentally sees Diana naked in the shower, and cannot get the image out of his mind. When Molly asks for a tattoo, Diana admits to Jimmy that what he thought was a birthmark on her leg, is in fact a tattoo of a rose she had done 30 years ago. They then decide to try reverse psychology and let Molly have the tattoo, but this does not work. However, due to her age Molly is refused a tattoo by the tattoo artist. Meanwhile, to Alex's horror a personality test says that he should become an accountant.
10	3	"Tell Tale"	Jim Armogida and Steve Armogida	21 September 2007	4.59
Jimmy holds a poker night, at which Diana beats him after Alex tells her Jimmy's tell and makes him do a monkey impression. Diana later tells Siobhan Jimmy's tell, which she then uses to test whether he is lying to her. The following night, Alex tells Jimmy what Diana's tell is, and he uses this to discover that Diana is having a relationship with Philip, who she had said was her bridge partner. Also, Molly gets a new outfit to impress her friends at the school photo while Alex rents a tuxedo.
11	4	"Meet The Parent"	Katie Douglas	28 September 2007	4.46
Siobhan's father David (Nicky Henson) comes round to meet Jimmy and he, David, Siobhan and Diana go out to dinner. Diana and David get on well and go out together the following night. However, after David sends many presents to Diana, she wants to end the relationship. Jimmy is worried that if she does this, he will not want him and Siobhan to continue their relationship. So Jimmy tries to tell him what Diana thinks, but David misunderstands and thinks Jimmy is talking about him and Siobhan. Diana then tells David herself. Meanwhile, Molly wants to look good to impress a boy and Alex is drawing up the family tree if Diana and David marry.
12	5	"Love and War"	Andrea Solomons	5 October 2007	3.45
On the 11th anniversary of her husband Patrick's death, Diana goes with Jimmy and the children to visit his grave. However, 12 red roses have already been placed on the grave and Diana immediately suspects that Patrick had an affair during their marriage. She wants to find out who the other woman was, and Jimmy finds out from the florist (Tracey Wilkinson) who sent the flowers. Jimmy then visits the lady (Di Botcher) and discovers that lady's son-in-law had placed the flowers on the wrong grave, her flowers were meant for her husband also called Patrick. Also, Siobhan goes back to college and Molly and Alex argue.
13	6	"When She Came Back"	James Hendrie and Ian Brown	12 October 2007	N/A
Ann (Samantha Spiro) returns from Africa, and Howard has just asked her to marry him. Soon she tells Jimmy to move out and takes away Diana's spare key so she can look after the children herself. Molly and Alex both soon miss Jimmy and Diana, while Jimmy has to sleep at Kev's flat. Jimmy later persuades Ann to go back to Africa like she wants to. Meanwhile, Molly is upset after being dumped by Shane while Alex pretends he has a broken leg to get out of PE. At Kev's flat, a parrot named Satan drops a poo bomb on a sleeping Jimmy's face.
14	7	"Ride of the Valkyrie"	James Hendrie and Ian Brown	19 October 2007	4.64
Diana's friend Pam Greerson (Georgie Glen) offers Diana exclusive German concert tickets if she finds her a builder. Jimmy needs the money so he agrees, but Kev believes that there is something suspicious about Pam, but Jimmy dismisses him. Just after being paid by Pam, the Police arrive and arrest her for fraud. Meanwhile, Alex runs for head prefect but when he wins he is disqualified after being caught bribing people meaning Molly's friend Ellie wins.
15	8	"Just Say No"	Katie Douglas	26 October 2007	4.61
After attempting to lift a bag of sand for a bet with Kev at work, Jimmy gets a hernia and is taken to hospital, where all the nurses are friends of Ann's and dislike him. After the operation, he recovers at home and gets a high on painkillers. During the high, he writes letters to people, including one to Siobhan proposing to her. Later, he has to try to tell her he did not mean to propose, only to discover that she knew this anyway. Meanwhile, Alex thinks he has become telepathic.
16	9	"And So This Is Christmas..."	Andrea Solomons	23 December 2007	3.40
A flood in Africa means that Ann cannot come home for Christmas and Jimmy and Diana are worried about making the children enjoy it and argue over the decorations. Molly and Alex are both in the school play, which is a modern version of Sleeping Beauty until Diana becomes the director and changes it back to the traditional story. Diana tells Jimmy he has to do the play's scenery, but when they argue he refuses to do it and she then says she will fly to Italy for Christmas. However, they later make up and just in time he produces the scenery. Meanwhile, Siobhan is annoyed that Jimmy has not invited her round for Christmas Day and Kev wants an office party.

=== Series 3 (2008) ===
No. overall	No. in series	Title	Written by	Original release date	Viewers (millions)
17	1	"Dawn of the Dad"	James Hendrie and Ian Brown	14 September 2008	3.40
After making the decision to become a proper father and do the parenting himself, Jimmy attempts to evict Diana from the house. However, when it begins to take a toll on his work and social lives, he reconsiders his decision. However, things begin to go awry; after being sent to school dirty and living without electricity, Molly and Alex leave home to go and live with Diana.
18	2	"Not Love, Actually"	Jim Armogida and Steve Armogida	21 September 2008	N/A
Jimmy begins to panic when Kev gets engaged. He worries that Siobhan will want a similar commitment from him, something that he cannot offer. Jimmy decides to try to put Siobhan off marriage, but will his ideas go to plan? Meanwhile, Diana meets an old friend on an internet chat-site – however, when she goes to meet him, he isn't exactly what she expected. Also, Molly discovers whom the person she has been taking advice from really is.
19	3	"Going Solo"	Andrea Solomons	28 September 2008	N/A
Diana challenges Jimmy to audition for a part in her choral society's latest play. However, she soon begins to regret her decision when she fails to win the part she had auditioned for. Meanwhile, Molly is angry when she discovers that Alex has arranged for the pair to go on a double-date with the Pendleburtons – the grottiest teenagers in the whole of London.
20	4	"Bad Old Days"	Katie Douglas	17 October 2008	N/A
Kev and Bobby begin to worry when Jimmy's split from Siobhan begins to take its toll. When Bobby and Kev suspect that Jimmy has started drinking again, it forces the pair to take drastic action – but can they persuade Diana to rescue Jimmy from rock bottom?
21	5	"Lure of the Rings"	Jim Armogida and Steve Armogida	24 October 2008	N/A
Jimmy becomes worried when Alex fails to leave his room for nearly a week. He discovers that what Alex has been up to is much worse than he first thought – acting out scenes from The Lord of the Rings. Jimmy's parenting skills are then put to the test when he is forced to take Alex to see a musical version of the film.
22	6	"Damaged"	Andrea Solomons	31 October 2008	N/A
When Kev is injured on a job, Jimmy finds himself in a predicament – Kev has appointed a familiar friend to be his lawyer, and he tells Jimmy that he is going to sue him. However, Jimmy soon begins to distrust Kev. Meanwhile, Molly is keen to put off her revision, and Alex has found himself a unique girlfriend. Jimmy finds out that Diana has taken early voluntary redundancy, and a new girl enters his life. This episode marks the last appearance of Siobhan.
23	7	"The Law of the Skip"	Jon Brown	7 November 2008	N/A
When Jimmy notices an abandoned table tennis table in a builders' skip, he decides to rescue it and give it a new home. However, Molly's boyfriend's dad pays them a visit, and it turns out that perhaps the table hadn't been entirely abandoned...
24	8	"Too Cool for School"	Katie Douglas	21 November 2008	N/A
Diana is determined that Alex should be sent to a private school, and she organises for an inspector from a top private school to come and visit. Alex decides to give the inspector a helping hand, and show him just how much he needs that scholarship. Meanwhile, Jimmy is determined to become a man, after one too many jibes about his feminism from Diana. But will he become a man or a fool with his recent manly purchase?
25	9	"There Will Be Pud"	Andrea Solomons	21 December 2008	N/A
Diana decides to spend Christmas in Florida. She swaps home with an American family. Unfortunately, while taking a shortcut to the airport she hits a cow. This means that she will have to spend Christmas with Jimmy and the kids. Jimmy proclaims that all he wants to do is sit on the sofa and watch Christmas movies. Meanwhile, due to a shortage of money, Alex starts selling Baby KaKas down the market, but later gets attached to the babies and changes his mind. A robbery at the Venables' leaves the family without any presents. The entire family opts for a revenge against a suspected robber by stealing his presents. This forces Diana to exercise the "nuclear option" and take a bath in champagne with the suspected robber.
