= FM (British TV series) =

2009 British television series

- Title card
- Genre: Sitcom
- Written by: Ian Curtis; Oliver Lansley
- Directed by: Elliot Hegarty
- Starring: Chris O'Dowd; Kevin Bishop; Nina Sosanya; Daniel Kaluuya; O-T Fagbenle
- Composer: Tim Laws
- Country of origin: United Kingdom
- Original language: English
- No. of series: 1
- No. of episodes: 6

Production
- Executive producer: Saurabh Kakkar
- Producer: Izzy Mant
- Editor: Mark Davies
- Camera setup: Single-camera
- Running time: 22 min.

Original release
- Network: ITV2
- Release: 25 February – 1 April 2009

FM is a British sitcom that aired on ITV2, starring Chris O'Dowd, Kevin Bishop and Nina Sosanya. The series followed the lives of two DJs and their producer on their FM radio programme, "Skin 86.5 FM". The show also featured music from real-life artists and guest stars from the music industry.

The first episode aired on 25 February 2009 and the series ran for 6 episodes. It broadcast on Wednesdays at 22:30. The series launched with 213,000 viewers. The whole series was re-run on Friday 3 April from 22:00 until 01:00. On 13 April 2009 the series was released on DVD with a BBFC rating of 15.

== Cast and characters ==
The main cast of FM, from left to right: Kevin Bishop as Dom Cox, Chris O'Dowd as Lindsay Carol, and Nina Sosanya as Jane Edwards

- Chris O'Dowd as Lindsay Carol
- Kevin Bishop as Dom Cox
- Nina Sosanya as Jane Edwards
- Ophelia Lovibond as Daisy
- O. T. Fagbenle as Topher Kiefer
- Oliver Lansley as Neil
- Daniel Kaluuya as Ades

== Production ==
A pilot episode was made in 2006 for Channel 4 by Room 5 Productions, with Dean Lennox Kelly, Warwick Davis and Raquel Cassidy in the lead roles. ITV Studios began searching for funding from record companies and radio stations to produce a second series for the show, but to no avail, so only one season was made.

This was the second time O'Dowd played a radio DJ; he had previously done this in the comedy movie The Boat That Rocked.

== Episodes ==
In addition to the title being a theme for each episode, they are also all names of songs; continuing the shows music related subject matter. The songs from each title are "Last Night a DJ Saved My Life" by Indeep, "System Addict" by Five Star, "Return to Sender" by Elvis Presley, "Golden Lady" by Stevie Wonder, "Video Killed the Radio Star" by The Buggles, and "Blinded by the Light" by Manfred Mann's Earth Band.

List of FM episodes
| No. | Title | Directed by | Written by | Original release date |
|---|---|---|---|---|
| 1 | "Last Night a DJ Saved My Life" | Elliot Hegarty | Ian Curtis | 25 February 2009 |
In between putting on their daily radio show, Lindsay tries to reinvent himself as a superstar club DJ, Jane gets to the eighth date for the first time, and Dom is haunted by his boy-band past. Featuring an exclusive performance from Guillemots, plus guest appearances from Marianne Faithfull and Justin Hawkins.
| 2 | "System Addict" | Elliot Hegarty | Ian Curtis | 4 March 2009 |
The group try to stick to some new resolutions: Dom gives up booze, Jane gives up cigarettes, and Lindsay gives up giving up on girls. Featuring a performance by The Wombats, and guest appearance by Toyah Willcox.
| 3 | "Return to Sender" | Elliot Hegarty | Ian Curtis | 11 March 2009 |
Dom goes deaf, Jane is outed as a kleptomaniac, and Lindsay sends out an email that causes mayhem. Also features a guest performance by Ladyhawke.
| 4 | "Golden Lady" | Elliot Hegarty | Ian Curtis | 18 March 2009 |
Lindsay, Dom and Jane have very different experiences of awards season. Featuring Konnie Huq and The Subways.
| 5 | "Video Killed the Radio Star" | Elliot Hegarty | Ian Curtis, Oliver Lansley | 25 March 2009 |
When Lindsay is given the chance to move into TV, he finds the leap harder than expected. Jane suspects that runner Ades is flirting with her. And Dom gets ready for the annual radio industry pub quiz by insulting Tim Westwood and threatening Richard Bacon. Featuring guest stars Sarah Champion and Jamie Theakston, plus a performance by Sway.
| 6 | "Blinded by the Light" | Elliot Hegarty | Ian Curtis, Oliver Lansley | 1 April 2009 |
Lindsay finds his principles tested when he meets a gorgeous but talentless singer. Meanwhile, Dom is conflicted when he is offered a job at a rival station, and Jane meets her nemesis. Featuring a guest appearance by Oliver Chris and a performance by The Charlatans and Screaming Tea Party.
