= Ian Curtis (actor) =

British actor, writer and director

Ian Curtis (born 1972 in Manchester, England) is a British actor, writer and director who is better known for his lead roles in Holby City, where he played Ray Sykes, and Soldier Soldier, in which he played Corporal Mark Hobbs. Other appearances include Dalziel and Pascoe, Doctors, and A Touch of Frost.

As a director Ian has co-written and directed the Channel 4 Comedy Lab FM in 2006 which is now in series development with ITV2. With co-writer Oliver Lansley they are writing six episodes which starts shooting in November 2008. Ian directed the 2007 Comedy Lab episode "Blowout", which won best comedy at the Scottish BAFTAs in 2007. Other credits include Sorry, I've Got No Head, a 13 episode 30-minute sketch show for CBBC.
