= Where's Wanda? =

2024 German TV series

Where's Wanda? is a German language black comedy television series created by Oliver Lansley and Zoltan Spirandelli. It premiered on October 2, 2024, on Apple TV+ and stars Heike Makatsch and Axel Stein. On February 27, 2025, it was announced that it had been renewed for a second season.

== Premise ==
Dedo and Carlotta Klatt, who are desperate to find their missing daughter Wanda, take matters into their own hands, co-opting their son Ole and items from the dark web to start spying on their own town. The discoveries lead them to learn many of the town's hidden secrets, many of which have nothing to do with the whereabouts of their daughter.

The events unfold in and around the fictional town of Sundersheim, a quaint circular community with an annual festival centered on a local monster, which happens on the day Wanda goes missing.

== Cast and characters ==
- Heike Makatsch as Carlotta Klatt
- Axel Stein as Dedo Klatt
- Lea Drinda as Wanda Klatt (and narrator)
- Leo Simon as Ole Klatt
- Nikeata Thompson as Detective Michelle Rauch

== Episodes ==
Season 1 started airing on October 2, 2024 with episode titles matching the names of families on which the Klatts are spying:

- Episode 1 – The Klatts (original air date: October 2, 2024): The Klatts' daughter Wanda goes missing, and they come up with an out-of-the-ordinary way to help find her.
- Episode 2 – The Hessels (original air date: October 2, 2024): Dedo breaks into the house of one of Wanda's high school teachers. Ole learns of his parents' plans and starts helping out.
- Episode 3 – The Roths (original air date: October 9, 2024): Carlotta and Dedo start spying on their couple's therapist
- Episode 4 - The Vinsons (original air date: October 16, 2024): Carlotta wishes her life were normal like the Vinsons and forms a bond with the Vinsons' daughter. Dedo and Ole attempt to handle an emergency and end up discovering a new clue.
- Episode 5 – The Novaks (original air date: October 23, 2024): Carlotta learns the truth about Dedo. Ole meets Chris, who knows more than he lets on.
- Episode 6 – The Küchlers (original air date: October 30, 2024)
- Episode 7 – The King (original air date: November 6, 2024
- Episode 8 – Wandafest (original air date: November 13, 2024)

Season 2 has been airing since October 21, 2026. This time, the episode titles are based on the days of the week in which the action takes place:

- Episode 1 – Monday (original air date: October 21, 2026)
- Episode 2 – Tuesday (original air date: October 28, 2026)
- Episode 3 – Wednesday (original air date: November 4, 2026)
- Episode 4 – Thursday (original air date: November 11, 2026)
- Episode 5 – Friday (scheduled air date: November 18, 2026)
- Episode 6 – Friday Night (scheduled air date: November 25, 2026)
- Episode 7 – Saturday (scheduled air date: December 2, 2026)
- Episode 8 – Sunday (scheduled air date: December 9, 2026)

== Production ==
Apple signed veteran producer Dr. Franziska An der Gassen as Creative Executive for Germany in 2022, and in 2023, greenlit production of the new series, its first German language series. Production had wrapped up by July of 2024, with target release date of October 2, with two episodes premiering on that date, and subsequent new episodes every Wednesday.

== Reception ==
The review aggregator website Rotten Tomatoes reported a 100% approval rating among critics, with an average rating of 7.0/10, based on 7 critic reviews.
