= The Two of Us (1986 TV series) =

- Genre: Sitcom
- Created by: Alex Shearer
- Starring: Nicholas Lyndhurst; Janet Dibley; Patrick Troughton; Tenniel Evans
- Theme music composer: Rod Argent; Peter Van Hooke
- Country of origin: United Kingdom
- Original language: English
- No. of series: 4
- No. of episodes: 32

Production
- Executive producer: Marcus Plantin
- Producers: Marcus Plantin; Robin Carr
- Running time: 30 minutes
- Production company: LWT

Original release
- Network: ITV
- Release: 31 October 1986 – 18 March 1990

The Two of Us is an ITV comedy series starring Nicholas Lyndhurst and Janet Dibley.

== Overview ==
The series focused on Ashley and Elaine, an unmarried couple living together, at a time when this was becoming increasingly common in Britain, but still frowned upon in some circles. It was produced by LWT.

While Ashley was keen for the pair to get married and would regularly propose, Elaine saw no reason to get married and was happy to keep her independence. Ashley's roguish grandfather Perce (played by Patrick Troughton, but later by Tenniel Evans after Troughton's death) was supportive of the couple, but Ashley's domineering mother (Jennifer Piercey) disapproved and constantly urged the pair to marry. Ashley's suppressed father (Paul McDowell) seemed less upset, but generally backed up his wife in the hope of a quiet life and the odd sherry.

After initially deciding to get married in the 1988 Christmas special, only to skip the wedding when their flight time for the honeymoon was brought forward, Ashley and Elaine finally married in the fourth series, with the pair focusing on their plans to start a family. In the final episode Elaine takes a pregnancy test, but the result is never revealed.

Two regional remakes were made of the series. In Germany, 41 episodes of Unter einer Decke (± Under one Roof) were produced in 1993/94, using most of the scripts from the original series, combined with new scripts from Germany and the Netherlands. The Dutch version Vrienden voor het leven (Friends for Life) had 65 episodes produced in 1990-95 of which 64 have been released on DVD in the Netherlands.

== Cast ==
- Nicholas Lyndhurst as Ashley Phillips
- Janet Dibley as Elaine Walker
- Patrick Troughton as Perce (Series 1)
- Tenniel Evans as Perce (Series 2–4)
- Paul McDowell as Mr Colin Phillips
- Jennifer Piercey as Mrs Lilian Phillips
- Francesca Hall as Karen
- Mark Jax as Gordon
- Victoria Wicks as Jackie (Ashley & Gordon’s Manager)

== Episodes ==
Series	Episodes	Originally released	
Series	Episodes	First released	Last released
1	7	31 October 1986	12 December 1986
2	6	11 September 1987	16 October 1987
Special		23 December 1988	
3	8	6 January 1989	24 February 1989
4	10	14 January 1990	18 March 1990

=== Series 1 (1986) ===
No. overall	No. in series	Title	Directed by	Written by	Original release date
1	1	"Proposals"	John Gorman	Alex Shearer	31 October 1986
Ashley invites his colleague and his wife to dinner to show Elaine how good marriage can be. However, he didn't expect them to be in the middle of an argument.
2	2	"Family Pressures"	Marcus Plantin	Alex Shearer	7 November 1986
Ashley's parents, who have old fashioned views about marriage, finally relent and allow Ashley and Elaine to share a room when they visit. However, the sleeping arrangements are different to what they expected.
3	3	"The Limit"	Marcus Plantin	Alex Shearer	14 November 1986
Elaine and Ashley both pretend that they are going on a date with other people to make each other jealous.
4	4	"Cracks in the Pavement"	John Gorman	Alex Shearer	21 November 1986
Ashley wants to prove to Elaine that he's not the polite, nice guy that his parents make him out to be. So he transforms himself into a punk. Featuring: Eamonn Walker as Floyd
5	5	"Feeling Broody"	Marcus Plantin	Alex Shearer	28 November 1986
6	6	"The Contract"	Marcus Plantin	Alex Shearer	5 December 1986
7	7	"The End of the Beginning"	John Gorman	Alex Shearer	12 December 1986

=== Series 2 (1987) ===
No. overall	No. in series	Title	Directed by	Written by	Original release date
8	1	"The Vital Spark"	Robin Carr	Alex Shearer	11 September 1987
Elaine returns home from a 6 month trip in Bombay as Ashley hasn't been keeping their flat tidy and the spark the two had between them has gone if only there was a way to get it back.
9	2	"Lifestyles"	Robin Carr	Alex Shearer	18 September 1987
10	3	"Comparisons"	Robin Carr	Alex Shearer	25 September 1987
11	4	"Getting Better"	Robin Carr	Alex Shearer	2 October 1987
12	5	"Career Development"	Robin Carr	Alex Shearer	9 October 1987
13	6	"Retirement Plans"	Robin Carr	Alex Shearer	16 October 1987

=== Christmas Special (1988) ===
No. overall	No. in series	Title	Directed by	Written by	Original release date
14	Special	"Wedded Miss"	Robin Carr	Alex Shearer	23 December 1988
Ashley and Elaine plan to get married, however things don't go quite to plan.

=== Series 3 (1989) ===
No. overall	No. in series	Title	Directed by	Written by	Original release date
15	1	"Should Auld Acquaintance..."	Robin Carr	Alex Shearer	6 January 1989
16	2	"The Poser"	Terry Kinane	Alex Shearer	13 January 1989
17	3	"The Party"	Robin Carr	Alex Shearer	20 January 1989
18	4	"The Prediction"	Robin Carr	Alex Shearer	27 January 1989
19	5	"Trust"	Terry Kinane	Alex Shearer	3 February 1989
20	6	"The Bargain"	Terry Kinane	Alex Shearer	10 February 1989
21	7	"Say It With..."	Terry Kinane	Alex Shearer	17 February 1989
22	8	"The Bequest"	Robin Carr	Alex Shearer	24 February 1989

=== Series 4 (1990) ===
No. overall	No. in series	Title	Directed by	Written by	Original release date
23	1	"The Telephone Only Rings Twice"	Terry Kinane	Alex Shearer	14 January 1990
Ashley finds a mobile phone on his way home from work, instead of handing it into the police straight away Ashley decides to do it in the morning, later that evening Ashley answers a mysterious phone call on it.
24	2	"Strictly Business"	Terry Kinane	Alex Shearer	21 January 1990
25	3	"The Treasure"	Terry Kinane	Alex Shearer	28 January 1990
26	4	"No Deposit No Return"	Terry Kinane	Alex Shearer	4 February 1990
27	5	"At Last"	Robin Carr	Alex Shearer	11 February 1990
28	6	"Fine Adjustments"	Terry Kinane	Alex Shearer	18 February 1990
29	7	"Old Scores"	Robin Carr	Alex Shearer	25 February 1990
30	8	"Dangers in the Night"	Terry Kinane	Alex Shearer	4 March 1990
31	9	"The Quest"	Terry Kinane	Alex Shearer	11 March 1990
32	10	"Best Laid Schemes"	Robin Carr	Alex Shearer	18 March 1990

== Home releases ==
|- | The Complete Series 1 || 8 February 2010 |-
