= The Piglet Files =

British ITV sitcom 1990–92

- Genre: Sitcom
- Created by: Paul Minett; Brian Leveson
- Starring: Nicholas Lyndhurst; Clive Francis; John Ringham; Michael Percival; Serena Evans; Louise Catt; Steven Law; Paul Cooper
- Country of origin: United Kingdom
- Original language: English
- No. of series: 3
- No. of episodes: 21

Production
- Running time: 25 minutes
- Production company: LWT

Original release
- Network: ITV
- Release: 7 September 1990 – 10 May 1992

The Piglet Files is a British sitcom produced by London Weekend Television (LWT) for ITV. The show consists of three series, totalling 21 episodes, that were broadcast between 7 September 1990 and 10 May 1992.

The programme follows the life of reluctant MI5 agent Peter "Piglet" Chapman as he tries to instruct his fellow agents on the finer points of spy gadgetry while keeping his wife Sarah in the dark about his new career.

== Plot ==
In the early 1990s, during the intervening period between the fall of the Berlin Wall and the collapse of the Soviet Union, MI5 combats the Soviet spies within the United Kingdom while facing their own agents' ineptitude, and the ridicule of the sheer fact that the Soviet Union is no longer a threat; but MI5 knows better, and indeed the Soviets are intent on making trouble.

In an effort to alleviate their agents' incompetence, MI5 hires local polytechnic teacher Peter Chapman, convincing him by getting him sacked from the polytechnic, which leaves him no choice. His new bosses, Maurice Drummond and Andrew Maxwell, assign him to the technology division, and he insists on having a codename to further his identity in the world of spying. The first codenames listed were Panda, then Panther, but those are already in use. They then incorrectly stated that Puma was the next available name before correcting themselves and assigning Peter the next name..."Piglet". Piglet routinely joins the other field agents on missions—mainly to ensure that MI5 gets its equipment back.

Peter "Piglet" Chapman must now face down Soviet assassins and double agents while keeping his identity as an MI5 technician secret from everyone else, including his wife Sarah.

== Characters ==
- Nicholas Lyndhurst as Peter "Piglet" Chapman
- Clive Francis as Major Maurice Drummond
- John Ringham as Major Andrew Maxwell
- Michael Percival as Dexter
- Serena Evans as Sarah Chapman
- Louise Catt as Flint
- Steven Law as Lewis
- Paul Cooper as Trueman

== Series overview ==
Series	Episodes	Originally released	
Series	Episodes	First released	Last released
1	7	7 September 1990	19 October 1990
2	7	3 May 1991	14 June 1991
3	7	29 March 1992	10 May 1992

== Episodes ==
=== Series 1 (1990) ===
No. overall	No. in series	Title	Directed by	Written by	Original release date
1	1	"A Question of Intelligence"	Robin Carr	Paul Minett and Brian Leveson	7 September 1990
When Peter Chapman is fired from his job as electronics lecturer at a polytechnic, a new role comes along almost immediately. His first day in the job doesn't exactly go to plan.
2	2	"Fair Exchange"	Robin Carr	Paul Minett and Brian Leveson	14 September 1990
Sarah is mistakenly captured by a couple of bumbling Russian agents, and getting little support from Drummond or Maxwell, Piglet goes about securing her return himself.
3	3	"A Room with a View"	Robin Carr	Paul Minett and Brian Leveson	21 September 1990
Since the fall of the Berlin wall, agents have been flooding into Britain. Dexter and Flint are staking out a house belonging to two such unwelcome guests, and Peter's brought in to help assist their surveillance by new electronic means ahead of a visit by their East German controller.
4	4	"The Ice Man Cometh"	Robin Carr	Paul Minett and Brian Leveson	28 September 1990
When the Russians mistake Piglet for another agent, it seems that his life may suddenly be in great danger. Meanwhile, his latest technological developments aren't exactly working as intended.
5	5	"The Beagle Has Landed"	Robin Carr	Paul Minett and Brian Leveson	5 October 1990
Dexter and Lewis attempt to infiltrate a militant animal-rights group. Unsurprisingly, they have little success. Piglet, however, could be just the man for the job.
6	6	"Now You See It"	Robin Carr	Paul Minett and Brian Leveson	12 October 1990
Piglet and the gang are sent chasing a top secret French-developed radar-cloaking system across the English countryside - unfortunately, both the Swedes and Americans are sticking their oars in!
7	7	"A Private Member's Bill"	Robin Carr	Paul Minett and Brian Leveson	19 October 1990
When a leading politician advocates the merging of MI5 and MI6 under the control of Special Branch, Piglet, Lewis, Dexter and Flint are sent out to thwart his plans by discrediting him.

=== Series 2 (1991) ===
No. overall	No. in series	Title	Directed by	Written by	Original release date
8	1	"The Wright Stuff"	Robin Carr	Paul Minett and Brian Leveson	3 May 1991
Dexter's compiling his memoirs - largely fictional - and intends to have them published one day. However, a former Assistant Director General of the service is about to have his own book published: and Peter's wife works for the publisher.
9	2	"Red Spy at Night"	Robin Carr	Paul Minett and Brian Leveson	10 May 1991
Drummond is more than a little surprised when an agent, buried 12 years ago, rings his front door bell at 11pm with a list of KGB informants and spies. However, he's delighted to find Maxwell's name on the list, and puts Piglet and Dexter on the case immediately. Could it possibly be true?
10	3	"Piglet in a Trough"	Robin Carr	Paul Minett and Brian Leveson	17 May 1991
Piglet's on a downward spiral: drinking, gambling, money troubles, and constantly cocking up at work. Thankfully, it's all a ruse between him and Drummond - unfortunately, it's because further information has come to light regarding Major Maxwell.
11	4	"The Wrong Combination"	Robin Carr	Paul Minett and Brian Leveson	24 May 1991
After a training exercise goes disastrously wrong, Maxwell is talked into a bet with one of the boys at MI6. He arranges to spring a safe-breaker from prison to assist in the task, but all is not quite as it seems and Piglet ends up in the thick of it.
12	5	"Trouble with Reception"	Robin Carr	Paul Minett and Brian Leveson	31 May 1991
Drummond decides that a reception at the Bishwani Embassy would be a good opportunity to bug the ambassador's office. Unfortunately for the MI5 team, a guerrilla group choose that night to make demands of their home Government.
13	6	"The Hunt for Red Decoder"	Robin Carr	Paul Minett and Brian Leveson	7 June 1991
MI5 have a spot of luck in liberating a highly sensitive encoding/decoding machine from a Soviet submarine - they're less able, however, to get it to work. As MI5 and the KGB chase the device across England, a Chapman finally has some luck with the machine - but it's not Peter!
14	7	"Under Cover Activity"	Robin Carr	Paul Minett and Brian Leveson	14 June 1991
Piglet is embroiled in a blackmail case when Drummond enlists him to help entrap a Russian agent. If it goes wrong his marriage could be in danger, but it seems really rather a simple affair.

=== Series 3 (1992) ===
No. overall	No. in series	Title	Directed by	Written by	Original release date
15	1	"Guerillas in the Mist"	Robin Carr	Paul Minett and Brian Leveson	29 March 1992
A bit of casual reconnaissance work for Piglet, Lewis and Dexter goes disastrously wrong when the target turns out to be an old friend of Drummond's - now quite mad and intent on blowing up the Channel Tunnel!
16	2	"Sweet and Sour Piglet"	Robin Carr	Paul Minett and Brian Leveson	5 April 1992
It's the MI5 - MI6 annual grudge match cricket game, and Maxwell's department have drawn the short straw and must compete. Meanwhile, spies from China are preparing their own scheme to do their worst to MI5's finest, and have given one agent extensive plastic surgery to become Peter's exact double.
17	3	"Sex, Spies and Videotape"	Robin Carr	Paul Minett and Brian Leveson	12 April 1992
Flint suffers an attempted mugging on the street near her home, and falls for the handsome stranger who comes to her aid. Meanwhile, Piglet is given permission to tell Sarah who his employer really is, as the department is involved in filming a recruitment video to engage the public.
18	4	"In Which We Serve"	Robin Carr	Paul Minett and Brian Leveson	19 April 1992
Peter and the rest of the department are on the trail of a French agent. The operation takes them to a hotel hosting an industry conference.
19	5	"The Plane Truth"	Robin Carr	Paul Minett and Brian Leveson	26 April 1992
When two soviet aircraft designers defect in quick succession, Piglet's technical knowledge - and a passing interest in plane design - places him as the best candidate to assess the men and work out who's their best source.
20	6	"Under New Management"	Robin Carr	Paul Minett and Brian Leveson	3 May 1992
The department is thrown into disarray when Maxwell brings in a new chief, pushing Drummond down the pecking order: a brash, no-nonsense northern woman. The sackings commence quickly, but Piglet and Drummond don't intend to simply roll over.
21	7	"With Friends Like These"	Robin Carr	Paul Minett and Brian Leveson	10 May 1992
Faced with mounting cutbacks from their respective governments, MI5 and the KGB are forced to collaborate in order to prove their worth. Is the staged kidnap of a senior Russian minister really wise?

== DVD release ==
All three series of The Piglet Files are available on DVD, through Network.
