= Nicholas Lyndhurst =

British actor (born 1961)

- Born: 20 April 1961 (age 65); Emsworth, Hampshire, England
- Education: Corona Theatre School
- Occupation: Actor
- Years active: 1973–present
- Known for: Role of Rodney Trotter in Only Fools and Horses (1981–2003)
- Television: Going Straight (1978); Butterflies (1978–1983); The Two of Us (1986–1990); The Piglet Files (1990–1992); Goodnight Sweetheart (1993–1999, 2016); After You've Gone (2007–2008); Rock & Chips (2010–2011); New Tricks (2013–2015); Frasier (2023–2024)
- Spouse: Lucy Smith (m. 1999)
- Children: Archie Lyndhurst
- Relatives: Francis Lyndhurst (paternal grandfather)

Nicholas Simon Lyndhurst (born 20 April 1961) is an English actor who began his career as a child actor. He is best known for his role as Rodney Trotter in the BBC sitcom Only Fools and Horses (1981–2003).

Lyndhurst had major roles in other sitcoms, including as Raymond Fletcher in Going Straight (1978), as Adam Parkinson in Butterflies (1978–1983), as Ashley Phillips in The Two of Us (1986–1990), as Peter "Piglet" Chapman in The Piglet Files (1990-1992), as Gary Sparrow in Goodnight Sweetheart (1993–1999, 2016), and as Jimmy Venables in After You've Gone (2007–2008). He starred as Freddie Robdal in the comedy-drama series Rock & Chips (2010–2011) and co-starred as Danny Griffin in the police procedural series New Tricks (2013–2015). He portrayed Professor Alan Cornwall in the revival of the American sitcom Frasier (2023–2024).

Lyndhurst won two National Television Awards for his role in Goodnight Sweetheart, as well as being nominated for a British Comedy Award and three British Academy Television Awards for his role in Only Fools and Horses.

== Early life ==
Nicholas Simon Lyndhurst was born in Gosport, Hampshire, England, on 20 April 1961, as the only child to Anthony Arthur Joseph "Joe" Lyndhurst and Elizabeth M "Liz" (née Long). He grew up in Emsworth. His parents met at the holiday camp on the farm owned by his paternal grandfather, Francis Lyndhurst, a theatrical scenery painter, film producer and film director, who set up an early film studio at Shoreham Fort, Shoreham-by-Sea. His parents separated when he was young, reuniting and separating permanently later on. His father had started a family with another woman by the time Lyndhurst was eight, leaving the boy and his mother "poverty-stricken".

Lyndhurst attended East Wittering Primary School. He then attended the Corona Theatre School in Hammersmith, London, where his friends included Lisa Vanderpump.

== Career ==
Lyndhurst made his debut as an actor with the uncredited role of Shot Cabin Boy in the historical drama film Bequest to the Nation, which was released on 25 April 1973. He appeared in various television advertisements and children's films during the 1970s before gaining the starring role of Tom Canty/Prince Edward in a BBC Television version of The Prince and the Pauper, directed by Barry Letts and broadcast in January 1976. He gained increased national recognition two years later in two BBC sitcom roles: Raymond Fletcher, the teenage son of Ronnie Barker's Norman Stanley Fletcher in Going Straight, and Adam Parkinson, a son of the characters played by Wendy Craig and Geoffrey Palmer in Carla Lane's Butterflies.

Lyndhurst achieved his best-known role in another BBC sitcom, Only Fools and Horses, created and written by John Sullivan, in which he played Rodney Trotter, the younger brother of the main character, Derek "Del Boy" Trotter, played by David Jason. Only Fools and Horses was first aired in 1981 and increased in popularity until it reached its peak in 1996 with its Christmas Day special in the UK. In a BBC poll in 2004 it was voted Britain's Best Sitcom by television viewers. He appeared in the series until its final airing at Christmas 2003 with the episode "Sleepless in Peckham".

Lyndhurst had a minor part in the 1986 film Sky Bandits. The film went straight to video and was never seen in British cinemas. During the mid-1980s and 90s, he also played Ashley Phillips in ITV's The Two of Us, which co-starred Janet Dibley, and MI5 agent Peter "Piglet" Chapman in The Piglet Files, as well as in a number of stage performances.

Lyndhurst played the lead character of Gary Sparrow in the time-travelling sitcom Goodnight Sweetheart between 1993 and 1999. At around the same time, he was the face and voice of the TV and radio advertisements for the telecommunications chain Peoples Phone. He said that he declined an opportunity to play the lead of Gary in the 1997 British film The Full Monty. Lyndhurst was the public face of the stationery store WH Smith between 1997 and 1999, starring in their adverts as all four members of one family. He won a British Academy of Film and Television Arts (BAFTA) Award for his acting in the adverts. In 1999, he played the villainous Uriah Heep opposite Daniel Radcliffe and Dame Maggie Smith in David Copperfield.

Lyndhurst joined the cast as a regular in the BBC police procedural series New Tricks in 2013, alongside Dennis Waterman and Tamzin Outhwaite. Lyndhurst revived his Goodnight Sweetheart character, Gary Sparrow, in a one-off special episode, which was aired on 2 September 2016.

Lyndhurst played the role of Star Keeper in Rodgers and Hammerstein's Carousel at the English National Opera in 2019. He played the governor/innkeeper in Man of La Mancha for English National Opera at the London Coliseum, in 2019. This was opposite Kelsey Grammer as Cervantes/Quixote, Danielle de Niese as Aldonza/Dulcinea and Peter Polycarpou as Sancho.

Lyndhurst appeared as Johnny in an episode of the CBBC sitcom So Awkward, alongside his son Archie Lyndhurst. The episode, "Awardatarian", was broadcast on 19 September 2019, having originally been released on BBC iPlayer on 12 September 2019.

Lyndhurst was cast as Professor Alan Cornwall in the new Frasier series in January 2023.

== Personal life ==
Lyndhurst married Lucy Jane Smith, a former ballet dancer, in a secret ceremony at St Mary's Church in Chichester, West Sussex, on 1 September 1999, having been engaged since 1990. The Reverend David Parker, rector of St Mary's Church, said the 40-minute ceremony took the form of a "traditional Church of England service".

Lyndhurst and Smith's only child, a son, Archie Lyndhurst, was born in Westminster, Greater London, on 4 October 2000. Archie was an actor and designer, who was best known for his role of Oliver 'Ollie' Coulton in the CBBC sitcom So Awkward. Their son died in his sleep from a brain haemorrhage caused by acute lymphoblastic leukemia at the family home in Fulham, Greater London, on 22 September 2020, aged 19. In a statement, he said he and his wife were "utterly grief stricken and respectfully request privacy."

Lyndhurst and his wife now reside in West Wittering, West Sussex.

Lyndhurst enjoys underwater diving and piloting his own aeroplanes.

== Filmography ==
=== Film ===
Year	Title	Role	Notes
1973	Bequest to the Nation	Shot Cabin Boy	Uncredited
1983	Bullshot	Nobby Clark	
1986	Sky Bandits	Chalky	
2005	Lassie	Buckle	
2016	A United Kingdom	George Williams	

=== Television ===
Year	Title	Role	Notes
1974	Heidi	Peter	4 episodes
1975	Anne of Avonlea	Davy Keith	6 episodes
1976	The Prince and the Pauper	Edward Prince of Wales, Tom Canty	6 episodes
1976	Peter Pan	Tootles	Television film, credited as; Nicky Lyndhurst
1978	Going Straight	Raymond Fletcher	4 episodes
1978	The Tomorrow People	Karl Brandt	2 episodes
1978	Playhouse	Westbrook	Episode: "Losing Her"
1978	Play of the Week	Brian Grant	Episode: "Fairies"
1978–1983	Butterflies	Adam Parkinson	28 episodes
1979	Father's Day	Philip Rice-Davies	Television film
1979	Two People	Matthew	2 episodes
1980	The Dick Emery Show		Episode: "Episode #18.2"
1980	To Serve Them All My Days	Dobson	4 episodes
1981	Spearhead	Private Wilson	4 episodes
1981–2003	Only Fools and Horses	Rodney Trotter	64 episodes
1982	Arena	Dennis	Episode: "A Genius Like US: A Portrait of Joe Orton"
1982	Play for Today	Policeman	Episode: "A Mother Like Him"
1982	Only Fools and Horses: Christmas Trees	Rodney Trotter	Short film
1982	The Funny Side of Christmas	Rodney Trotter, Adam Parkinson	Television film
1983	It'll All Be Over in Half an Hour	Various	3 episodes
1983	Michael Barrymore		1 episode
1984	Only Fools and Horses: License to Drill	Rodney Trotter	Video
1984	Slimming Down	Sebastian	Television film
1984	Haunted	Jack (voice)	Video
1984	Round and Round	Patrick	Episode: "Sex"
1984	Haunted: Tales of the Supernatural	Jack	Podcast series, Episode: "Channel Crossing"
1984–1985	The Lenny Henry Show	Various	3 episodes, credited as; Nick Lyndhurst
1986	Only Fools and Horses: Royal Variety Show	Rodney Trotter	Television film
1986–1990	The Two of Us	Ashley Phillips	32 episodes
1990	Only Fools and Horses: The Robin Flies at Dawn	Rodney Trotter	Short film
1990–1992	The Piglet Files	Peter Chapman	19 episodes
1993	Stalag Luft	'Chump' Cosgrove	Television film
1993–1999, 2016	Goodnight Sweetheart	Gary Sparrow, Colonel Henri Dupont	59 episodes
1996	Gulliver's Travels	Clustril	Episode: "Episode #1.1"
1997	Only Fools and Horses: Only Fools Cutaway	Rodney Trotter	Short film
1997	The English Programme	Clustril	2 episodes
1999	David Copperfield	Uriah Heep	2 episodes
2000	Butterflies Reunion Special	Adam Parkinson	Short film
2000	Thin Ice	Graham Moss	Television film
2002	The Life and Times of Aly Martin-Smith	Aly Martin-Smith	Television film
2003	Murder in Mind	Alan Willis	Episode: "Landlord"
2006	The Children's Party at the Palace	Cruella de Vil's Chauffeur (The 101 Dalmatians)	Television special
2007–2008	After You've Gone	Jimmy Venables	25 episodes
2008	After You've Gone: Deleted Scenes	Jimmy Venables	Video
2008	After You've Gone: Outtakes	Jimmy Venables	Uncredited
2010–2011	Rock & Chips	Freddie Robdal	3 episodes
2013–2015	New Tricks	Danny Griffin	26 episodes
2014	Only Fools and Horses: Beckham in Peckham	Rodney Trotter	Short film
2019	So Awkward	Johnny	Episode: "Awardatarian"
2023–2024	Frasier	Alan Cornwall	20 episodes

=== Radio ===
Year	Title	Role	Station	Notes
1974–1975	Drama Now: Stones		BBC Radio 3	2 episodes
1976	Thirty-Minute Theatre: Open Day	John Burns	BBC Radio 4	1 episode
1986	The Afternoon Play	Narrator	BBC Radio 4	1 episode
1999	Only Fools and Horses	Rodney Trotter	BBC Radio 4	4 episodes
2007	Parkinson's Sunday Supplement		BBC Radio 2	1 episode
2008–2009	Original Shorts	Reader	BBC Radio 4	3 episodes
2010	Steve Wright in the Afternoon	Himself	BBC Radio 2	1 episode
2011	Richard Bacon	Himself	BBC Radio 5 Live	1 episode
2012	Saturday Drama	Sergeant Hanley	BBC Radio 4	1 episode
2012	My First Planet	Brian	BBC Radio 4	11 episodes
2013	Haunted	Jack	BBC Radio 4 Extra	1 episode
2017	Graham Norton	Himself	BBC Radio 2	1 episode
2019	The Michael Ball Show	Himself	BBC Radio 2	1 episode
2023	Liza Tarbuck	Himself	BBC Radio 2	1 episode
2023	Jo Whiley	Himself	BBC Radio 2	1 episode

=== As himself ===
Year	Title	Notes
1977	Our Show	7 episodes; Presenter
1978	The Saturday Banana	Presenter
1981	Give Us a Clue	Episode: "Episode #4.13"
1982	The Kenny Everett Television Show	Episode: "Episode #2.0"
1982	Head for Business	
1984	The Saturday Picture Show	Episode: "Episode #1.19"
1984	Children in Need	1 episode
1984–1985	Blankety Blank	2 episodes
1985	Saturday Superstore	Episode: "Episode #3.24"
1987	The Grand Knockout Tournament	1 episode
1988	Aspel & Company	Episode: "Episode 5.4"
1988, 1991, 1997	Comic Relief	3 episodes
1992	Wogan	Episode: "Episode #12.29"
1992, 2000	Auntie's Bloomers	2 episodes
1996	National Television Awards	
2002	The Story of 'Only Fools and Horses...'	
2004	Britain's Best Sitcom	2 episodes
2004	Richard & Judy	1 episode
2005	Parkinson	1 episode
2007	This Morning	1 episode
2010	The One Show	1 episode
2011	The Comedy Genius of John Sullivan	
2017	David Jason: My Life on Screen	Episode: "Episode #1.2"
2017	The Story of... Only Fools and Horses....	6 episodes
2023	Frasier Inside the Series	Interviewee

== Awards and nominations ==
Year	Group	Award	Work	Result
1987	British Academy Television Awards	BAFTA Best Light Entertainment Performance	Only Fools and Horses	Nominated
1991	British Academy Television Awards	BAFTA Best Light Entertainment Performance	Only Fools and Horses	Nominated
1997	British Academy Television Awards	BAFTA Best Comedy Performance	Only Fools and Horses (Christmas Special)	Nominated
1997	British Comedy Awards	Best TV Comedy Actor	Only Fools and Horses (Christmas Special)	Nominated
1997	National Television Awards	Most Popular Comedy Performer 1997	Only Fools and Horses	Nominated
1998	National Television Awards	Most Popular Comedy Performer 1998	Goodnight Sweetheart	Won
1999	National Television Awards	Most Popular Comedy Performer 1999	Goodnight Sweetheart	Won
