= Archie Lyndhurst =

English actor and designer (2000–2020)

- Lyndhurst as Oliver 'Ollie' Coulton in a promotional photo of So Awkward (2015)
- Born: Archie Bjorn Lyndhurst; 4 October 2000; Westminster, Greater London, England
- Died: 22 September 2020 (aged 19); Fulham, Greater London, England
- Education: Sylvia Young Theatre School; Arts Educational Schools
- Occupations: Actor, designer
- Years active: 2010–2020
- Known for: Role of Oliver 'Ollie' Coulton in So Awkward (2015–2020)
- Partner: Nethra Tilakumara (2019–2020)
- Father: Nicholas Lyndhurst
- Relatives: Francis Lyndhurst (paternal great-grandfather)

Archie Bjorn Lyndhurst (4 October 2000 – 22 September 2020) was an English actor and designer. With a career that spanned a decade, he was best known for his role as Oliver 'Ollie' Coulton in the CBBC sitcom So Awkward (2015–2020). He was the only child of the actor Nicholas Lyndhurst and his wife, Lucy Smith.

== Early life ==
Archie Bjorn Lyndhurst was born in Westminster, Greater London, England, on 4 October 2000, as the only child to Nicholas Lyndhurst, an actor who is best known for his role as Rodney Trotter in the BBC sitcom Only Fools and Horses, and his wife, Lucy Jane (née Smith), a former ballet dancer. He was baptised in Chichester, West Sussex, in July 2001.

Lyndhurst was the paternal great-grandson of Francis Leonard Lyndhurst, a theatrical scenery painter, film producer and film director.

== Career ==
Lyndhurst started as a child actor, after training in acting at the Sylvia Young Theatre School, in Marble Arch, London, from September 2011. He studied at the Arts Educational Schools in Chiswick, West London, for five months.

Lyndhurst often worked with the comedian and actor Jack Whitehall, making his television debut with the role of Young Jack in the second episode in the second series of the Sky1 Christmas comedy-drama, Little Crackers. The episode, "Jack Whitehall's Little Cracker: Daddy's Little Princess", was broadcast on 18 December 2011. He played Little Jack Whitehall in the ITV television variety show, Tonight at the London Palladium, in the episode broadcast on 28 September 2014. He played Young Alfie Wickers in the BBC Three sitcom, Bad Education. The episode, "The Exam", was broadcast on 14 October 2014. He played Young Jack Whitehall in the short film, Jack Whitehall Gets Around: Intro, which was released on 24 November 2014.

Lyndhurst played Young Michael Gambon in the BBC Two comedy television film, Harry and Paul's Story of the Twos. The film was broadcast on 25 May 2014.

Lyndhurst voiced Jung in The Secret World: Issue 10 – Nightmares in the Dream Palace. The video game was released on 4 December 2014.

Lyndhurst played Oliver 'Ollie' Coulton in the CBBC sitcom, So Awkward, from 21 May 2015 until his death during the airing of the sixth series. He appeared alongside his father, Nicholas, in the second episode in the fifth series, "Awardatarian", which was broadcast on 19 September 2019, having originally been released on BBC iPlayer on 12 September 2019. His character was written out at the start of the seventh series.

Lyndhurst voiced Honoroit Bandarlois, a non-playable character, in Final Fantasy XIV: Heavensward. The video game was released on 21 June 2015.

Lyndhurst appeared on the ninth episode in the third series of the CBBC game show, Ultimate Brain. The episode, "Ultimately Awkward", was broadcast on 20 August 2016, where he was a contestant on the Blue Team, along with Jamie Flatters and Charlie Nicholson, his co-stars from So Awkward.

Lyndhurst played Max in the BBC Two comedy television film, Our Ex-Wife. The film was broadcast on 1 September 2016.

Lyndhurst played Elliot Morford in the 25th episode in the 32nd series of the BBC One medical drama series Casualty. The episode was broadcast on 24 February 2018.

Lyndhurst launched Fated to Pretend, his clothing line, in November 2019.

Lyndhurst appeared in the independent play Tracers, a Vietnam War play, which was performed in Islington, North London, in March 2020. Tracers was written by six Vietnam veterans when they came back from Vietnam and directed by Bryn Williams.

Lyndhurst made his final appearance as an actor, with the role of Henry Bramble in the fantasy adventure short film, The Infectious Imagination of Henry Bramble, written, directed and edited by Derek Boyes. The film was posthumously released in the United States on 4 July 2021. He first played the role in 2013. He posthumously won the Best Actor (Adult & Professional) Award at the Children's International Film Festival of Wales in 2022.

== Personal life ==
Lyndhurst was in a relationship with actress Nethra Tilakumara, at the time of his death. The couple started dating on 12 April 2019.

Lyndhurst had a close friendship with the comedian and actor Jack Whitehall. He took shopping and groceries to Whitehall's parents, Michael and Hilary, when they were unable to leave their house during the COVID-19 lockdown.

== Death ==
Lyndhurst died in his sleep from a brain haemorrhage caused by acute lymphoblastic leukaemia at his family home in Fulham, Greater London, on 22 September 2020. He was 19. In a statement on 1 October, his father, Nicholas, said he and his wife, Lucy, were "utterly grief stricken and respectfully request privacy." The following day, his girlfriend Tilakumara paid tribute to him in a lengthy post on Instagram. His funeral service took place on 23 November 2020.

His death prompted tributes from fans across the world. Jack Whitehall led tributes on social media, along with several of his So Awkward co-stars.

== Filmography ==
Year	Title	Role	Notes
2011	Little Crackers	Young Jack	Episode: "Jack Whitehall's Little Cracker: Daddy's Little Princess"
2014	Harry and Paul's Story of the Twos	Young Michael Gambon	Television film
2014	Tonight at the London Palladium	Little Jack Whitehall	Episode: "Episode #1.3"
2014	Bad Education	Young Alfie Wickers	Episode: "The Exam"
2014	Jack Whitehall Gets Around: Intro	Young Jack Whitehall	Short film
2014	The Secret World: Issue 10 – Nightmares in the Dream Palace	Jung (voice)	Video game
2015–2020	So Awkward	Oliver 'Ollie' Coulton	Main cast; 77 episodes
2015	Final Fantasy XIV: Heavensward	Honoroit Bandarlois (voice)	Video game
2016	Ultimate Brain	Himself	Episode: "Episode #3.9"
2016	Our Ex-Wife	Max	Television film
2018	Casualty	Elliot Morford	Episode: "Episode #32.25"
2021	The Infectious Imagination of Henry Bramble	Henry Bramble	Short film; Posthumous release

== Legacy ==
Lyndhurst is featured on the "In Memory Of" section of the official British Academy of Film and Television Arts (BAFTA) website. He was remembered during the "In Memoriam" section of the 2021 British Academy Television Awards, which was held on 6 June.

The debut episode of the Paramount+ revival and sequel of the NBC sitcom, Frasier, is dedicated to Lyndhurst, amongst others. The episode was broadcast on 12 October 2023.
