= Oliver Lansley =

British actor and writer (born 1981)

- Occupations: Actor, writer
- Years active: 2002–

Oliver Lansley is a British actor and writer, who has created and appeared in several TV series and films. He is known for writing the 2010 sitcom Whites, and is the co-founder and co-director of Les Enfants Terribles theatre company, along with James Seager.

== Career ==
Lansley is best known for writing the screenplay for the 2010 sitcom Whites.

He has appeared in several TV comedy series, including The Wrong Mans, Misfits, and created the 2024 series Where's Wanda?.

== Theatre company ==
Lansley is co-founder and co-director of Les Enfants Terribles theatre company, along with James Seager. The company was founded in 2002, and has been nominated for two Olivier Awards (2015 & 2024) as well as The Stage Innovation Award in 2016. In 2017, it was listed on the "Stage Power 100 List". Its productions include The House with Chicken Legs, The Terrible Infants, United Queendom, Inside Pussy Riot, and Alice's Adventures Underground.

== Filmography ==
=== Film ===
Year	Title	Role	Notes
2002	The Burdened Ass	John The Soldier	Short
2004	Strange Little Girls	Rob	Short
2006	A Fellow of Enterprise	Clive	Short
2015	Warpaint	Paul	Short
2015	Man Up	Man in Toilet #2	
2016	Sarah Gong Is Going to Kill Herself	Receptionist	Short
2017	Pleased to Eat!	John	Short

=== Television ===
Year	Title	Role	Notes
2001	EastEnders	Craig	1 Episode
2003	Holby City	Tim Marlowe	1 Episode
2006	Doctors	Dean Gaynor	1 Episode
2006	Comedy Lab	Neil	1 Episode
2009	FM	Neil	6 Episodes
2010	Whites	Robin	4 Episodes
2012	Best Possible Taste: The Kenny Everett Story	Kenny Everett	Television movie
2013	The Wrong Mans	Summer	3 Episodes
2013	Misfits	Stuart	4 Episodes
2014	Sherlock	David	1 Episode
2014	Endeavour	Benny Topling	1 Episode
2014	Siblings	Gavin	1 Episode
2014	Agatha Raisin	Dr. Brendon Monk	1 Episode
2015	Critical	Wes Howe	1 Episode
2015	Lewis	David Capstone	1 Episode
2016	The Aliens	Sean	1 Episode
2017	Doctor Who	Jorj	Episode: "World Enough and Time"
2024	Where's Wanda?	Series creator	Series creator

=== Video games ===
Year	Title	Role	Notes
2009	Risen	Taylor/Krayban/Beppo	(Voice)

== Staff credits ==
Year	Title	Staff	Notes
2006	Comedy Lab	Writer	1 Episode
2009	FM	Writer	4 Episodes
2010	Whites	Writer and producer	6 Episodes
2011	Beaver Falls	Writer	1 Episode
2011	Little Crackers	Writer and director	1 Episode
2014	Mr Sloane	Writer	1 Episode
2014	The Trench	Writer	Short
2015	Flack	Writer	Television movie
2017	Pleased to Eat You!	Writer	Short
