= List of awards and nominations received by Only Fools and Horses =

- Part of Only Fools and Horses's opening sequence
Awards and nominations
Award	Won	Nominated
British Academy of Film and Television Arts	6	12
British Comedy Awards	7	1
National Television Awards	3	2
Royal Television Society	2	0
Television and Radio Industries Club	2	0
Writers' Guild of Great Britain	1	0
- Total number of wins and nominations
Totals	21	15
- References

Only Fools and Horses is a British sitcom created and written by John Sullivan and broadcast on BBC One. Seven series were broadcast between 1981 and 1991, followed by sporadic Christmas specials until 2003. The show centres on the lives of the Trotters, a working-class family of market traders who live in Peckham, London. Headed by Del Boy, his younger brother Rodney and their elderly Grandad (and later their Uncle Albert), the series shows their highs and lows in life as they strive to become millionaires through a variety of get-rich-quick schemes. The show achieved consistently high ratings, including a record 24.3 million viewers for the 1996 episode "Time on Our Hands", and was named Britain's Best Sitcom in a 2004 BBC poll.

Only Fools and Horses was nominated for, and received, a multitude of awards. It received its first BAFTA nomination in 1983, but lost out to Hi-de-Hi!. A year later it won its first major award, when it was named Comedy Programme of the Year by the Television and Radio Industries Club. The show was nominated for eight BAFTAs for best comedy series, winning in 1988, 1990 and 1996. It also won three British Comedy Awards, a National Television Award, a Royal Television Society Award and another TRIC award in 1997. For his portrayal of Del Boy, David Jason won two BAFTAs (from six nominations), three British Comedy Awards, two National Television Awards and one Royal Television Society Award. Nicholas Lyndhurst received three BAFTA nominations. In 1997 John Sullivan won the Writers' Guild of Great Britain award for Best Situation Comedy.

== Awards ==
=== BAFTA ===
Year	Category	Nominee(s)	Result
1983	Comedy Series	Ray Butt	Nominated
1985	Comedy Series	Ray Butt	Won
1985	Light Entertainment Performance	David Jason	Nominated
1986	Comedy Series	Ray Butt	Nominated
1986	Light Entertainment Performance	David Jason	Nominated
1986	Light Entertainment Performance	Nicholas Lyndhurst	Nominated
1988	Comedy Series	John Sullivan, Gareth Gwenlan, Tony Dow	Won
1988	Light Entertainment Performance	David Jason	Nominated
1989	Comedy Series	John Sullivan, Gareth Gwenlan, Tony Dow	Nominated
1989	Light Entertainment Performance	David Jason	Nominated
1990	Comedy Series	John Sullivan, Gareth Gwenlan, Tony Dow	Nominated
1990	Light Entertainment Performance	David Jason	Won
1990	Light Entertainment Performance	Nicholas Lyndhurst	Nominated
1991	Comedy (Programme or Series)	John Sullivan, Gareth Gwenlan, Tony Dow	Nominated
1996	Comedy (Programme or Series)	John Sullivan, Gareth Gwenlan, Tony Dow	Won
1996	Comedy Performance	David Jason	Won
1996	Comedy Performance	Nicholas Lyndhurst	Nominated
2004	Audience Award	John Sullivan, Gareth Gwenlan, Tony Dow	Won

=== British Comedy Awards ===
Year	Category	Nominee(s)	Result
1990	Best BBC Sitcom	Only Fools and Horses	Won
1990	Best TV Comedy Actor	David Jason	Won
1991	WGGB Top Comedy Writer	John Sullivan	Won
1992	Best TV Comedy Actor	David Jason	Won
1997	People's Choice Award	Only Fools and Horses	Won
1997	Best TV Comedy Actor	David Jason	Won
1997	Best TV Comedy Actor	Nicholas Lyndhurst	Nominated
1997	Funniest Comedy Moment	Only Fools and Horses	Won

=== National Television Awards ===
Year	Category	Nominee(s)	Result
1997	Most Popular Comedy Series	John Sullivan, Gareth Gwenlan, Tony Dow	Won
1997	Most Popular Comedy Performer	David Jason	Won
1997	Most Popular Comedy Performer	Nicholas Lyndhurst	Nominated
2002	Most Popular Comedy Programme	John Sullivan, Gareth Gwenlan, Tony Dow	Nominated
2002	Most Popular Comedy Performance	David Jason	Won

=== Royal Television Society ===
Year	Category	Nominee(s)	Result
1996	Situation Comedy and Comedy Drama	Only Fools and Horses	Won
1996	Best Actor	David Jason	Won

=== Television and Radio Industries Club Awards ===
Year	Category	Nominee(s)	Result
1984	Comedy Programme of the Year	Only Fools and Horses	Won
1997	Situation Comedy of the Year	Only Fools and Horses	Won

=== Other ===
Year	Category	Award	Nominee(s)	Result
1990	SOS Star Awards	Funniest TV Programme	Only Fools and Horses	Won
1997	Writers' Guild of Great Britain	Situation Comedy Writer	John Sullivan	Won
2001	The Heritage Foundation	Best TV Comedy	Only Fools and Horses	Won
2001	The Heritage Foundation	Best TV Writer	John Sullivan	Won
2002	TV Quick Awards	Best Comedy	Only Fools and Horses	Won
