= Heartburn Hotel =

- Created by: Steve Glover; John Sullivan
- Directed by: Tony Dow; Gareth Gwenlan
- Starring: Tim Healy; Clive Russell; Peter Gunn
- Country of origin: United Kingdom
- Original language: English
- No. of series: 2
- No. of episodes: 13 (list of episodes)

Production
- Running time: 30 minutes

Original release
- Network: BBC One
- Release: 20 July 1998 – 28 July 2000

Heartburn Hotel is a British sitcom that ran for two series on BBC One from 1998 to 2000.

The programme concerns the owner-operator and tenants of the Olympic Hotel—an establishment named in anticipation of a successful Olympic bid by the UK. Each series is six episodes long; one special aired in December 1998. Heartburn Hotel was written by John Sullivan and Steve Glover; it starred Tim Healy as the hotel's proprietor.

The first series premiered on BBC One at 10 PM on 20 July 1998. The second series aired from 23 June to 28 July 2000, at a 10:20 PM time slot.

== Characters ==
Harry Springer and Duggie Strachan are the protagonists in the comedy. After both characters were involved in the Falklands War, they moved back to Birmingham; Harry to own the Olympic Hotel, and Duggie to become a teacher. These two characters take opposing viewpoints in almost every matter, and, although Harry pretends to sympathise with his customers, his views are radically right-wing as opposed to Duggie who emphatically empathises due to his own plight brought about by his gambling addiction. The reason Duggie accepts his landlord's overbearing boorishness dates back to the Falklands, when Harry saved his life; a fact that Harry does not let Duggie forget. Other characters include Baker (Kim Wall), Morgan (Ifan Huw Daffyd) and Scouse (Stephen Aintree).

== Episode list ==
=== Series 1 (1998) ===
No. overall	No. in season	Title	Directed by	Written by	Original release date
1	1	"Blood"	Tony Dow	John Sullivan and Steve Glover	20 July 1998
Life at Birmingham's Olympic Hotel is as grotty as it has ever been – and then the civil servant nephew of proprietor Harry turns up.
2	2	"Toenails"	Tony Dow	John Sullivan and Steve Glover	27 July 1998
Two models turn up at the hotel looking for a room. After recovering from the shock of having paying customers, Harry decides it's time that he and Duggie got back in the saddle, and arranges a romantic evening for the quartet.
3	3	"Frustration"	Tony Dow	John Sullivan and Steve Glover	3 August 1998
With Yvonne and Rita on their last day at the Olympic, Harry decides to hold a party in the Torville and Dean Lounge. If only he hadn't sent Debbie home with the key to the bar.
4	4	"War"	Tony Dow	John Sullivan and Steve Glover	10 August 1998
When a freshly deposed African Prince arrives at the hotel in search of a room, Harry's insatiable instinct for money gets the better of him.
5	5	"More War"	Tony Dow	John Sullivan and Steve Glover	17 August 1998
Harry's preparations for war are coming along at a good pace. Prince Ekoku is concerned about funding the operations, but may be able to offer something to help.
6	6	"Love"	Tony Dow	John Sullivan and Steve Glover	24 August 1998
With the Eurovision Song Contest being held in Birmingham, Harry has offered to put up an act in the hotel. But he hadn't bargained on love walking through the door.
Christmas special
7	–	"Bash"	Gareth Gwenlan	Steve Glover	27 December 1998
It's Christmas at the Olympic Hotel, and with Duggie set to be away, Harry is desperate to hold a New Year's Eve bash.

=== Series2 (2000) ===
No. overall	No. in season	Title	Directed by	Written by	Original release date
8	1	"Guilty"	Gareth Gwenlan	John Sullivan and Steve Glover	23 June 2000
When the hotel lift plummets four storeys into the basement with Harry inside, the basement's concrete floor is as shattered as Harry's pelvis. But what Duggie and Simon discover beneath it could prove even more problematic
9	2	"Vows"	Gareth Gwenlan	John Sullivan and Steve Glover	30 June 2000
With Susan demanding more than her fair share of Harry's property and what passes for 'wealth', Duggie and Simon are left scratching their heads for a solution.
10	3	"Siege"	Gareth Gwenlan	John Sullivan and Steve Glover	7 July 2000
After receiving a string of death threats and other menacing messages, and with Debbie mugged near the hotel, Harry hires a personal bodyguard in the form of old army buddy O'Hare.
11	4	"Hero"	Gareth Gwenlan	John Sullivan and Steve Glover	14 July 2000
When Harry tries to tell his war story (with a few artistic liberties) to a local newspaper, the hotel is visited by someone rather unexpected with a few revelations for him and Duggie.
12	5	"Kin"	Gareth Gwenlan	John Sullivan and Steve Glover	21 July 2000
Harry's brother pays a visit, and the Scouse git is keen to impress. But Tony has something that's likely to shock even him.
13	6	"Therapy"	Gareth Gwenlan	John Sullivan and Steve Glover	28 July 2000
Following a gas leak at a nearby mental hospital, a group of patients are sent to the hotel, along with their incredibly attractive, young, female doctor, who attracts the attention of Harry, Duggie, and Simon.
