= Roger Roger =

British television series

- Roger Roger opening titles, series 1
- Genre: Comedy-Drama
- Written by: John Sullivan
- Directed by: Tony Dow; Roger Bamford
- Starring: Robert Daws; Keith Allen; Pippa Guard; David Ross; Philip Glenister
- Country of origin: United Kingdom
- Original language: English
- No. of series: 3
- No. of episodes: 17

Production
- Producers: Gareth Gwenlan (1998–99); Tony Dow (2003)
- Running time: 50–60 minutes

Original release
- Network: BBC1
- Release: 26 August 1996
- Release: 8 January 1998 – 10 August 2003

Roger Roger is a BBC television comedy drama written by John Sullivan. The series was about a minicab firm called Cresta Cabs. The pilot aired in 1996 and there were three subsequent series on BBC1 in 1998–2003.

== Cast and characters ==
Main characters

- Robert Daws as Sam: The owner of Cresta Cabs. He struggles to keep the company operational despite financial problems. His wife is in a nursing home with early-onset Alzheimer's and later dies. He had a brief affair with his married colleague Reen and still has feelings for her.
- Keith Allen as Dexter: Sam's business partner. He has a young wife Tina and a lavish lifestyle, which he supports by embezzling company funds. He apparently kills himself in series 1, leaving Sam in financial trouble, but reappears in series 3, having faked his death.
- Pippa Guard as Reen: The office manager and dispatcher at Cresta Cabs. She is married to an alcoholic but is in love with Sam.
- David Ross as Baz: A postman who drives minicabs part-time. Baz goes on a series of unsuccessful first dates through a dating agency. He has a developmentally disabled stepson, Marlon.
- Philip Glenister as Phil (played by Neil Morrissey in the pilot): A minicab driver and aspiring rock star with a girlfriend Chrissie and two children, Madonna and Cher. In the second series, he is hired as a personal driver by a businessman who turns out to be a criminal. He does not appear in series 3.
- Helen Grace as Chrissie (played by Lesley Vickerage in the pilot): Phil's girlfriend who wants him to settle down and be realistic about his chances of becoming a rock star. She does not appear in series 3.
- Barbara Durkin as Tina: Dexter's flighty wife who makes advances on Sam after Dexter's death.
- Terence Maynard as Andre: A minicab driver and ladies' man who has several children with different women. He does not appear in series 3.
- Paul Sharma as Rajiv: A minicab driver and accountant who later becomes Sam's business partner.
- Jude Akuwudike as Henry: A minicab driver notorious for getting lost.
- Ricci Harnett as Marlon: Baz's developmentally disabled stepson.
- Chris Larkin as Cambridge: A minicab driver who went to university. He does not appear in series 3.
- John Thomson (series 1) and Jonathan Moore (series 2–3) as Barry: A minicab driver.

Recurring and other characters

- Barry Foster as Pieter Eugene: A shady businessman who employs Phil in series 2.
- Kirstie Kober as Madonna: Daughter of Phil and Chrissie.
- Lauren Ashby as Cher: Daughter of Phil and Chrissie.
- Joan Hodges as Marilyn: The night-shift dispatcher at Cresta Cabs.
- Robert Glenister as Dr. Geoff: Sam's therapist in series 3.
- Beth Goddard as Melanie: One of Baz's dates who turns out to have a child with Andre. (Series 1, Episode 5)
- Sam Spiegel as Monsieur Pierre
- Anthony Head as Jimmy Price: A rock star whose wife makes advances on Phil. (Pilot)
- Sally Dexter as Maddie Price: The wife of rock star Jimmy Price. (Pilot)
- Ross O'Hennessy as Policeman

== Episodes ==
=== Pilot (1996) ===
The pilot was a 60-minute episode that aired 26 April 1996 on BBC1.

No. overall	No. in series	Title	Directed by	Original release date
1	1	"Roger Roger"	Tony Dow	26 August 1996
Sam runs Cresta Cabs, a minicab company, with the help of his office manager Reen. Baz, a postman working part-time as a driver, copes with a developmentally disabled stepson and tries to find love through a dating agency. Another driver, Phil, is an aspiring rock star who gets into trouble when he discovers that one of his fares is the wife of his idol.

=== Series 1 (1998) ===
The first series had six 50-minute episodes, airing from 8 January to 12 February 1998 on BBC One. The storyline involves the apparent suicide of Sam's business partner Dexter and Sam's discovery that Dexter embezzled from the company.

No. overall	No. in series	Title	Directed by	Original release date
2	1	"Even Quasimodo Pulled"	Tony Dow	8 January 1998
A new communications system causes problems at Cresta Cabs when Sam and Reen accidentally broadcast a private conversation to all cabs. Sam's partner Dexter returns from abroad after a breakdown caused by his unfaithful wife Tina.
3	2	"I Used to Be a Superb Rugby Player"	Tony Dow	15 January 1998
Cresta Cabs is short of drivers, but Dexter has not returned to work yet. He wrongly suspects Tina of being unfaithful again and gets Cambridge to destroy an expensive painting he bought her, not realising that Cambridge is in someone else's house.
4	3	"Socks with Little Tennis Players on Them"	Tony Dow	22 January 1998
Dexter sees the insurance salesman Tina had an affair with at his house. He jumps into the Thames, and soon afterwards the insurance salesman's body is found in the boot of one of the minicabs.
5	4	"There Are No Mini-cabs in Heaven"	Roger Bamford	29 January 1998
Sam makes the arrangements for Dexter's funeral, but things do not go as planned. Henry drives a pregnant woman to the hospital and is mistaken for the baby's father.
6	5	"Some Get the Magic, Some Get the Tragic"	Roger Bamford	5 February 1998
Baz finally connects with one of his dates, but he learns that Andre is the father of her son. Rajiv is mugged in his minicab and is afraid to return to work. Sam asks for Rajiv's help with the company accounts and learns that Dexter embezzled large amounts of money.
7	6	"The Day the Music Died"	Roger Bamford	12 February 1998
Phil is promised a spot for his band in a talent show if he can acquire a boa constrictor for one of his agent's other clients. Marlon gets a job in a grocery store. Sam goes to visit his wife who is in a nursing home with early-onset Alzheimer's.

=== Series 2 (1999) ===
The second series had seven 50-minute episodes that aired from 25 September to 6 November 1999 on BBC One. In this series, Sam attempts to recover from the financial problems caused by Dexter and to ward off the advances of Dexter's wife Tina. A secondary storyline involves Phil becoming a driver for a businessman who turns out to be a criminal.

No. overall	No. in series	Title	Directed by	Original release date
8	1	"Welcome to Responsibilityville"	Roger Bamford	25 September 1999
Cresta Cabs is in financial difficulties after Dexter stole money from the company. His wife Tina loses her house and shows up on Sam's doorstep, interrupting an intimate moment with Reen. Cambridge is tricked into skinny dipping by two female passengers who take his clothes and minicab.
9	2	"Every Victim Wishes He'd Kept His Clothes On"	Roger Bamford	2 October 1999
Sam is unable to resist Tina's advances. Phil is in debt to a recording studio. He has car trouble while driving a businessman from the airport and later returns a wallet the man left in his cab.
10	3	"Sometimes It's Hard to Be a Man"	Roger Bamford	9 October 1999
Reen learns about Sam and Tina. Upset about Phil's debt, Chrissie takes the kids to her mother's. Phil accepts an offer to work as a driver to Mr. Eugene, the businessman whose wallet he returned. Marlon is taken advantage of by a girl and her friends.
11	4	"Ask the 1975 Millwall Defence"	Tony Dow	16 October 1999
Tina continues to insinuate herself into Sam's life. Phil realises that Chrissie has left him. Sam tries to get an important contract for Cresta Cabs, but the meeting is a disaster. Rajiv is offered a partnership in Cresta Cabs. Baz wakes up in bed with the owner of his dating agency.
12	5	"I'm Not a Little Baby and Daddy Hasn't Gone to Japan"	Tony Dow	23 October 1999
Tina shows no signs of leaving Sam's house. Sam gets the important contract for Cresta Cabs and goes out to dinner with the company's owner, Helen Jackson. Marlon is tricked into letting some kids steal from the shop where he works. The owner of Baz's dating agency is shocked when he rejects her. Mr. Eugene asks Phil to deliver some packages and hire female escorts for a party.
13	6	"Too Much Wine, Too Many Stars"	Tony Dow	30 October 1999
Andre meets a young girl in a bar, and Sam goes out with Helen Jackson, but they discover that the girl is Andre's daughter with Helen. Phil brings escorts to Mr. Eugene's party where cocaine is being served.
14	7	"Love Rules the Heart, Money Takes the Soul"	Tony Dow	6 November 1999
Tina learns about Helen and moves out. Reen tells Sam she and her husband are trying to save their relationship. Sam gets caught in an explosion when Barry's mechanic brothers-in-law dump petrol down the toilet. Reen overhears Sam confessing his feelings for her. Phil is arrested and learns that he has been delivering drugs for Mr. Eugene. He agrees to wear a wire but Mr. Eugene reveals that he is untouchable because of the high-powered men who were at his party.

=== Series 3 (2003) ===
The third series had three 60 minute episodes that aired from 27 July to 10 August 2003 on BBC One. The story deals with Dexter's return from abroad after faking his death in series 1.

No. overall	No. in series	Title	Directed by	Original release date
15	1	"Play It Again, Sam"	Roger Bamford	27 July 2003
Sam is conned out of a fleet of minicabs by a woman claiming to be an old acquaintance.
16	2	"Thank God It Wasn't Boat Race Day"	Roger Bamford	3 August 2003
Dexter returns and reveals to Sam that he faked his death, but they are unable to tell anyone because of the insurance salesman Dexter killed.
17	3	"Freedom's Just Another Word for Nothing Left to Lose"	Tony Dow	10 August 2003
Sam punches Reen's husband Tommy because he thinks he abused her. He later learns Tommy is dead and wrongly assumes he killed him. Sam and Dexter go on the run. Sam tells his therapist that Dexter is alive, but Dr. Geoff thinks Sam is hallucinating and has him committed to a mental hospital.
