= Trigger (Only Fools and Horses) =

Fictional character from Only Fools and Horses

- Only Fools and Horses; Rock & Chips character
- Roger Lloyd-Pack as Trigger
- First appearance: Big Brother
- Last appearance: Sleepless in Peckham
- Created by: John Sullivan
- Portrayed by: Roger Lloyd-Pack (1981–2003); Lewis Osborne (2010-2011)

In-universe information
- Occupation: Road sweeper
- Family: Donald Turpin (father); Elsie Ball (mother); Unnamed half-sister
- Relatives: Arthur Ball (grandfather); Alice Ball (grandmother); Reenie Turpin (aunt); Cyril (cousin); Ronnie (cousin); Marilyn (cousin); Lisa (niece)

Colin Arthur Ball, better known as Trigger, is a fictional character in the BBC sitcom Only Fools and Horses and its prequel Rock & Chips. He was played by Roger Lloyd-Pack in Only Fools and Horses and Lewis Osbourne in Rock & Chips. According to Del Boy, he earned the nickname Trigger because he looks like a horse.

== Characteristics ==
A regular at the Nag's Head pub, and old friend of Del Boy, Trigger is a road sweeper and also engages in trading and petty thefts. Trigger speaks in a slow, monotone voice, and is very simple-minded, although affable and warm-hearted. Trigger did not know his father, saying "he died a couple of years before I was born", when Rodney asks of his whereabouts in the episode "Ashes to Ashes". He was brought up by his grandparents, with his grandfather having also been a road sweeper. When Trigger is pushed by Boycie to say who his mother had written down on the birth certificate as Trigger's father, Trigger says, reluctantly, "Some soldiers". The 2015 official "autobiography" of Del Boy, He Who Dares, states of Trigger: "It was generally agreed though that his dad was Donald Turpin (brother of Mum's best mate, Reenie)... when Elsie started showing, she claimed she'd been 'visited by an angel!', leading the rest of the Ball clan to start making plans for the arrival of a new messiah. But Donald had been heard bragging about how he'd lost his virginity... giving full details of the time and place, and was therefore fingered as a much more likely suspect than the Archangel Gabriel." His birth certificate can be seen in the Peckham Archives book, where his middle name is given as Arthur (from his grandfather).

Trigger is not married, but he occasionally mentions past relationships during the series and is seen on a blind date with a woman in the 1988 Christmas special, "Dates".

Trigger always calls Rodney Trotter "Dave". Rodney corrects him in "Homesick", and he agrees to stop, but a few seconds later he calls him "Dave" again. When Cassandra, Rodney's wife, announced she was pregnant in "Modern Men", everybody raised a toast "To Cassandra and Rodney", but Trigger can be heard saying "Dave" after everyone else has spoken. At another point, while discussing Del and Raquel's son, Trigger reports that "if it's a boy, they're naming him Rodney, after Dave".

In one episode Trigger proudly says that he has used the same broom for 20 years, with it only needing 17 new heads and 14 new handles in that time. The concept of "Trigger's broom" has been used as another name for the Ship of Theseus paradox.

== Appearances ==
Trigger appeared in the first episode and continued to appear regularly throughout the entire show's run. He is an example of a breakout character in that he became popular with the show's audience, despite his status as a minor, supporting character.

Trigger is later mentioned occasionally in the sequel series The Green Green Grass. Marlene's sister Petunia mentions Trigger as the only remaining regular at the Nag's Head, referring to him as "Forrest Gump's dopey friend". He later appears as a teenager in the Only Fools and Horses prequel series, Rock & Chips. He is a relatively minor character in the prequel series, but in "The Frog and the Pussycat", Violet Trotter, Del's grandmother, mentions Grandad's affair with Trigger's grandmother, Alice Ball. This is the first time in the Only Fools and Horses franchise that Trigger's real name is mentioned. At one point in the pilot episode, Reg asks Del and Jumbo if Trigger is mentally OK, since he once spotted Trigger laughing at a television set which was turned off.

Trigger was scripted to appear in the 2014 Only Fools and Horses sketch for Sport Relief, but Lloyd-Pack died on 15 January 2014, from pancreatic cancer. The script was subsequently rewritten to omit his role, although it is mentioned in the sketch that Trigger cannot assist Del and Rodney with their latest business venture because he is working at the market. The sketch was dedicated to the memory of Lloyd-Pack and John Sullivan.
