= Over Here (TV series) =

1996 film by Tony Dow

- Genre: War drama; Comedy drama
- Written by: John Sullivan
- Directed by: Tony Dow
- Starring: Samuel West; Martin Clunes
- Composer: Graham Jarvis
- Country of origin: United Kingdom
- Original language: English
- No. of series: 1
- No. of episodes: 2

Production
- Executive producer: John Sullivan
- Producer: Jacinta Peel
- Running time: 185 min

Original release
- Network: BBC1
- Release: 7 April – 8 April 1996

Over Here is a two-part television drama made in 1996 by the BBC for BBC1 from 7 to 8 April 1996, this comedy-drama serial chronicling the lives of US Army Air Corps B-17 Flying Fortress bomber crews on a Royal Air Force Spitfire base during World War II. Samuel West starred as the RAF pilot Archie Bunting. Martin Clunes stars as Group Captain Barker, a man who flinches at the mention of, and has an inability to say the word, "Luftwaffe"; and Jay Goede as the New York City-bred American soldier Hershel Lenko, who becomes the most unlikely friend to Archie in the film's second half.

== Plot ==
In the early stages of their involvement in World War II a squadron of American bombers are en route to England. Due to an air raid their destination, a new base, is unavailable and they have to divert to a nearby base, RAF Lytchmere. News then reaches the inbound crews of unserviceable RADAR equipment and because of which the squadron is almost attacked by Archie Bunting. The personnel infrastructure leads to the overcrowding at RAF Lytchmere with the arrival of the Americans and various petty conflicts arise. The series is loosely based on an idea for a novel by Earnest Maxim, which was to be entitled Buddy & Chum.

== Locations ==
Location venues for the filming were the village of Castle Acre, RAF West Raynham and RAF Sculthorpe, Wolterton Hall, and Kimberley Hall in the English county of Norfolk.
