= Peter Gunn (actor) =

English actor

- Born: 13 February 1963 (age 63); Lytham St Annes, Lancashire, England
- Occupation: Actor
- Years active: 1988–present
- Spouse: Julie Gunn
- Children: Tom Gunn & George Gunn

Peter Gunn (born 13 February 1963) is an English actor. He has appeared in several TV series and TV films.

On British television, Gunn is known as the character Len Cosgrove in the BBC series Born and Bred as well as dozens of guest-starring and recurring roles in other television series and films such as Frost, Heartburn Hotel, and Sunshine. To American audiences, he is probably best known for portraying Oswald Granger in the 2009 film Hannah Montana: The Movie.

Gunn has also appeared in Coronation Street as Brian Packham, former partner of Julie Carp and former Headmaster of Bessie Street School since 2010. He also starred as Pat Kennedy on the ITV drama series London's Burning in 2000.

In 2006, Gunn appeared in three television adverts for John Smith’s.

He has two sons, George and Tom.

In 2022, he appeared in Celebrity Antiques Road Trip.

== Filmography ==
Films
Title	Year	Role	Notes
Treacle	1988	Frankie Duffell	Short film
Resurrected	1989	Bonner	
Funny Bones	1995	Nicky	
Blue Juice	1995	Terry Colcott	
Soup	1996	Scientist	Short film
When Saturday Comes	1996	Tommy	
Twelfth Night	1996	Fabian	
Brassed Off	1996	Simmo	
Roseanna's Grave	1997	Cop 1	
Ever After: A Cinderella Story	1998	Captain Laurent	
24 Hour Party People	2002	Farmer	
Int. Bedsit- Day	2007	Dan	Short film
A Bunch of Amateurs	2008	Frank Dobbins	Film selected for the Royal Film Performance of 2008
Hannah Montana: The Movie	2009	Oswald Granger	People's Choice Award for Favorite Family Movie
United	2011	PC Gunstone	Uncredited

Television
Title	Year	Role	Notes
Wonderworks: Young Charlie Chaplin	1989	Policeman	Series 1: Episode 1
Flying Lady	1989	Ned Kellet	Episode: "Second Honeymoon"
The Paradise Club	1989	Eddy Gunn	Episode: "Unfrocked in Babylon
The Return of Shelley	1989	Police Constable	Episode: "Wages of Virtue"
El C.I.D.	1990	Melvin	Episode: "Copping Out"
Never the Twain	1990	Policeman	Episode: "There But for the Grace of God"
Casualty	1990	Malcolm	Episode: "All's Fair"
Harry Enfield's Television Programme	1990	Mike	Series 1: Episode 5
Love Hurts	1992	Devlin	Episode: "Cured"
The Bill	1993	Pool Manager	Episodes: "Missionary Work"
Minder	1994	Clive	Episode: "The Immaculate Contraption"
Pie in the Sky	1994	Dave Pyke	Episode: "An Innocent Man"
Sharpe's Company	1994	Private Clayton	Television film
The Inspector Alleyn Mysteries	1994	Sergeant Oliphant	Episode: "Scales of Justice"
The Bill	1994	David Roe	Episodes: "Inquest"
Shakespeare: The Animated Tales	1994	Voice of Touchstone and Messenger	Episode: "As You Like It"
The Bill	1995	Paul Shaw	Episodes: "Rock-A-Bye-Baby"
Hetty Wainthropp Investigates	1997	Bryan	Episode: "A Rose by Any Other Name"
Grange Hill	1997	Mr. Frampton	Series 20: Episode 2
The Mill on the Floss	1997	Reverend Stelling	Television film
A Touch of Frost	1997	Sydney Snell	Episode: "House Calls"
Holding On	1997	Len	2 episodes
The Bill	1997	Barry Welsh	Episodes: "Straying"
Kiss Me Kate	1998	Client	Episode: "Mike"
Heartburn Hotel	1998–2000	Simon Thorpe	All 13 episodes
The Dark Room	1999	Bernard Weston	Television film
People Like Us	1999	Dean Trussler	Episode: "The Managing Director"
London's Burning	2000	Pat Kennedy	3 episodes
Casualty	2000	Jim Roberts	Episode: "Blood Brothers"
North Square	2000	Steve Blatter	Series 1: Episode 7
Sword of Honour	2001	Sergeant Tozer	Television film
Office Gossip	2001	Bernard	Episode: "Lucky in Love"
Heartbeat	2001	Eddie Ford	Episode: "She's Leaving Home"
The Way We Live Now	2001	Inspector Brown	Series 1: Episode 3
Micawber	2002	Knapper	Episode: "Micawber and the Aristocracy"
Born and Bred	2002–2005	Len Cosgrove	All 36 episodes
Shipman	2002	DS John Ashley	Television film
Holby City	2002	Daman Harris	Episode: "Design for Living"
Birthday Girl	2002	Charlie Boyd	Television film
Meades Eats	2003	Trevor Neville	Episode: "Whose Food?"
Sugar Rush	2006	Mark's Father	Series 2: Episode 9
Doctors	2007	Ed Woollard	Episode: "The Good Samaritan"
The Street	2007	Solicitor	Episode: "Taxi"
Wild at Heart	2008	Kevin Alsop	Series 3: Episode 1
Sunshine	2008	Terry	Series 1: Episode 1
The Royal	2009	Harry	Episode: "A Hero for Our Time"
Tracy Beaker Returns	2010	Service Station Manager	Episode: "A Day at the Beach"
Coronation Street	2010–2013, 2015–present	Brian Packham	Series regular
Doctors	2010	Dave Earnshaw	Episode: "Paradise Lost"
Eric & Ernie	2011	Billy Crackers	Television film
Skins	2011	Owen Creevey	Episode: "Alo"
32 Brinkburn Street	2011	Mr. Peters	Series 1: Episode 2
Doctors	2014	Gary Matthews	Episode: "The Apprentice"
All at Sea	2014	Fergal	Episode: "Gumball"
Casualty	2015	Bryan Munnings	Episode: "Excess Baggage"
The Coroner	2015	Robert Talbot	Episode: "The Deep Freeze"
Comedy Playhouse	2015	Jack	Episode: "Broken Biscuits"
Cold Feet	2016	Paul Matthews	3 episodes
