= Walliams & Friend =

- Genre: Comedy show Sketch show
- Created by: David Walliams; Dawson Bros.
- Starring: David Walliams; Ashley Gilmour; Jason Lewis; James Greene; Vernon Kay; Morgana Robinson; Mike Wozniak
- Country of origin: United Kingdom
- Original language: English
- No. of series: 1 (and 1 pilot)
- No. of episodes: 7

Production
- Running time: 40 minutes (pilot); 30 minutes (series)
- Production company: BBC

Original release
- Network: BBC One
- Release: 24 December 2015 – 27 December 2016

Walliams & Friend is a British sketch show, produced by and starring David Walliams. A pilot episode aired on BBC One on 24 December 2015 and a full series of 6 episodes was officially commissioned on 20 May 2016, which first aired on 25 November 2016. BBC announced that Walliams & Friend was cancelled after the first series.

== Episodes ==
Series	Episodes	Originally released	
Series	Episodes	First released	Last released
Pilot		24 December 2015	
1	6	25 November 2016	27 December 2016

=== Pilot episode (2015) ===
No. overall	No. in series	Title	Directed by	Written by	Original release date	UK viewers (millions)
1	Pilot	"Joanna Lumley"	Matt Lipsey	David Walliams & Dawson Bros.	24 December 2015	6.0
1. Head of BBC Announcement; 2. 'Brain Power' Show; 3. The Seven Lumleys; 4. 'James Bond' Parody; 5. Unhappily Married Couple; 6. Liars Anonymous; 7. Cash4Money; 8. Home Crafts; 9. Cheeky Selfie #1; 10. Autocorrect Founder; 11. Tanya's Tans; 12. Bedtime Stories with Banker Dad; 13. Oscar Wilde; 14. Cheeky Selfie #2; 15. Simon Cowell and Uptown Boys; 16. The Great British Bake Off - Mary and Paul's Dirty Talk; 17. Newsreaders - Goodnight; 18. Cheeky Selfie #3

=== Series 1 (2016) ===
No. overall	No. in series	Title	Directed by	Written by	Original release date	UK viewers (millions)
2	1	"Jack Whitehall"	Matt Lipsey	David Walliams & Dawson Bros.	25 November 2016	5.6
See Jack Whitehall as you've never seen him before. This episode includes Jack and David's inappropriate take on Sherlock and Watson; the world's worst dating show contestant and Jack doing something David has never done before - dressing as a woman. Also includes the launch of Britain's cruellest reality TV show, Celebrity Slammer, in which David finds himself locked up with the likes of The Chuckle Brothers and Bob Carolgees.
3	2	"Harry Enfield"	Matt Lipsey	David Walliams & Dawson Bros.	2 December 2016	5.1
David Walliams and Harry Enfield appear together as John Torode and a rather fussy Gregg Wallace in MasterChef; portray a hilarious pair of ageing lotharios and take a look back at some of Harry's comedy characters that never saw the light of day - until a certain David Walliams got his hands on them. Adding a touch of royalty to proceedings, Her Majesty the Queen is surprised by her own family history when she takes part in the genealogy show Who Does One Think One Is?.
4	3	"Sheridan Smith"	Matt Lipsey	David Walliams & Dawson Bros.	9 December 2016	5.2
The multi-talented Sheridan Smith transforms into a real-life Barbie doll, faces an unlikely dilemma whilst filming a swords-and-sorcery epic, and hits all the wrong notes as a cruise ship singer with a chip on her shoulder. David and Sheridan play bickering husband and wife contestants on an ill-fated game show, What's She Cross About?, plus we get to travel back in time to the 1970s to watch the classic politically-correct film, Carry On Up The Sexual Harassment Tribunal.
5	4	"Meera Syal"	Matt Lipsey	David Walliams & Dawson Bros.	16 December 2016	4.8
David Walliams is joined by actress, writer and comedian Meera Syal. Together for the first time, these two classic sketch performers introduce us to the sadly disappointing pleasure robots of tomorrow. David and Meera also play a squabbling husband and wife, debates about Justin Bieber's hairstyle, commissions a prime-time TV entertainment show, desperately trying to explain their problematic marriage to their young daughter using her Peppa Pig dolls. Plus a struggling actress auditions for the role of background extra in the evening news and a robber meets his match in the BBC's newest police drama Good Cop, Indian Mum Cop. Absent:- Middle Class Jeremy Kyle
6	5	"Miranda Richardson"	Matt Lipsey	David Walliams & Dawson Bros.	23 December 2016	3.10
David Walliams is joined by actress Miranda Richardson where they promote an advert for Hurt Feelings Direct, chooses a Christmas film to watch together that they don't agree on, introduces viewer Gillian Turner who loves Ant but hates Dec, a man refuses to pay 5p for a carrier bag at a supermarket by stuffing his items on his body, suggests an unlikely blockbuster movie starring Harry Potter & James Bond alongside choosing a new car, with "additional extras". Absent:- Il Prima Donnas.
7	6	"Hugh Bonneville"	Matt Lipsey	David Walliams & Dawson Bros.	27 December 2016	2.3
This Christmas Special was moved back from 10:00pm on BBC1 back to 11:20pm to make way for "George Michael at the Palais Garnier Paris", a schedule change to pay tribute to Wham! singer George Michael.

== Reception ==
The Times described the show as "Exceptionally accomplished, with every sketch sharply observed and superbly performed", while The Independent made similar comparisons: "Worthy of Messrs Barker and Corbett at their best". The Guardian noted that the show "Thrives on charm and silliness and points a way for the sketch show to continue to exist on television". The Sunday People declared "The good old sketch show is back." while The Daily Telegraph said "David Walliams goes back to basics here with a series of comedy sketches that will remind many why they first found him funny.". However, later in the show's run, The Times's Andrew Billen remarked of the sketch genre that "Even Harry Enfield and David Walliams couldn't save the sketch show".
