= Micawber (disambiguation) =

Wilkins Micawber is a character in the Charles Dickens novel David Copperfield, who is noted for his poverty, effusive speech, and eternal optimism ("something will turn up").

Micawber may also refer to:

- Micawber (television), a 2001 ITV drama by John Sullivan starring David Jason, based on the Dickens character
- The name of Keith Richards' main Telecaster guitar
- Micawber, a children's picture book by John Lithgow
