= Sitting Pretty (TV series) =

1992 British BBC sitcom

- Created by: John Sullivan
- Written by: John Sullivan
- Directed by: Susan Belbin; Angela De Chastelai Smith
- Starring: Diane Bull; David Ashford; John Cater
- Country of origin: United Kingdom
- Original language: English
- No. of series: 2
- No. of episodes: 13

Production
- Producer: Susan Belbin
- Running time: 30 minutes

Original release
- Network: BBC One
- Release: 19 November 1992 – 29 December 1993

Sitting Pretty is a 1992 BBC television sitcom written by John Sullivan. The series starred Diane Bull, David Ashford and John Cater and was directed by Susan Belbin and Angela De Chastelai Smith.

The series followed the travails of a woman whose millionaire husband dies suddenly. She discovers that her husband's will has left her penniless and she is forced to move back in with her parents and sister on their farm.

The lead role was originally intended to be played by a male lead, but was changed to become the first Sullivan sitcom to feature a female lead since Just Good Friends. However, it is also remembered as the writer's first notable failure.
