= Big School =

British television series

- First series titlecard
- Genre: Sitcom
- Created by: David Walliams
- Written by: David Walliams; Dawson Bros.
- Directed by: Tony Dow (2013); Matt Lipsey (2014)
- Starring: David Walliams; Catherine Tate; Philip Glenister; Frances de la Tour; Joanna Scanlan; Daniel Rigby; Steve Speirs; Jocelyn Jee Esien
- Composers: David Arnold; Michael Price
- Country of origin: United Kingdom
- Original language: English
- No. of series: 2
- No. of episodes: 12 (list of episodes)

Production
- Executive producer: Mark Freeland
- Producer: Jo Sargent
- Production location: Salisbury
- Running time: 30 minutes
- Production companies: King Bert Productions; BBC

Original release
- Network: BBC One
- Release: 16 August 2013 – 10 October 2014

Big School is a British sitcom, starring David Walliams, Catherine Tate, Steve Speirs, Frances de la Tour, Joanna Scanlan and Philip Glenister. It is set in a secondary school and follows the comedic relationships of the teachers. The first series began airing on BBC One on 16 August 2013, and was met with polarised reviews. The final episode of the first series aired on 20 September 2013. On 2 December 2013, BBC One controller Charlotte Moore announced that Big School had been renewed for a second series, which concluded on 10 October 2014. In June 2015, it was officially announced that Big School would not be returning for a third series.

== Plot ==
The series follows Keith Church (David Walliams), a socially naive chemistry teacher at the fictional Greybridge Secondary School, in Surrey, who falls for new French teacher Sarah Postern (Catherine Tate), who believes herself to be an inspirational teacher, in tune with youth culture and a beautiful woman. However, she is also getting attention from the arrogant and rude sports teacher Trevor Gunn (Philip Glenister). Other staff members include Ms Baron (Frances de la Tour) as the alcoholic 'no nonsense' headmistress, Mr Martin (Daniel Rigby), a music teacher with ambitions to be a singer-songwriter, Mr Barber (Steve Speirs), a geography teacher who is having a nervous breakdown and is employed as a caretaker in the second series and Mr Hubble (James Greene), the elderly and unwell head of science. The pupils at the school are portrayed as being mainly interested in social networking, texting and partying and as being bored by the attempts of Mr Church and Miss Postern to engage with them. The most prominent of them in the first series is a streetwise pupil called Manyou, played by Joivan Wade, who is asked for advice on how to succeed with women by Mr Church.

== Production ==
The show was written by David Walliams (who had previously produced Little Britain), along with Dawson Bros., and directed by Tony Dow. Many scenes for the series were shot at Bishopshalt School, Hillingdon, West London. The pupils gave up their school holidays to come to the school and be extras. Other inside shots were filmed at Pinewood Studios in Buckinghamshire. The titles were scrapped in Series 2 and were replaced by simple text at the centre of the screen.

== Cast ==
Actor/Actress	Character	Profession	Duration	Year
David Walliams	Mr Keith Church	Deputy Head of Science (2013–14); Head of Science (2014)	1x01–2x06	2013–14
Catherine Tate	Miss Sarah Postern	French Teacher	1x01–2x06	2013–14
Philip Glenister	Mr Trevor Gunn	PE Teacher; Geography Teacher (2014)	1x01–2x06	2013–14
Steve Speirs	Mr Gareth Barber	Geography Teacher (2013, 2014); Caretaker (2014)	1x01–2x06	2013–14
Joanna Scanlan	Mrs Janine Klebb	Drama Teacher	1x01–2x04	2013–14
Frances de la Tour	Ms Margaret Baron	Headmistress	1x01–2x06	2013–14
Jocelyn Jee Esien	Daphne	Secretary	1x01–2x06	2013–14
Daniel Rigby	Mr Luke Martin	Music Teacher	1x01–2x05	2013–14
James Greene	Mr. John Hubble	Head of Science	1x01–2x05	2013–14
Matthew Fenton	Nicholas	Pupil	1x01–2x06	2013–14
Cheryl Fergison	Jo	Lab Assistant	1x01–2x06	2014
Julie T. Wallace	Pat Carrington	Lab Assistant	1x01–1x06	2013
Joivan Wade	Manyou	Pupil	1x01–1x06	2013
Georgia Thompson	Beyoncé	Pupil	1x01–1x06	2013
Carla Ryan	Tina	Pupil	1x01–1x06	2013
Connor Goodliff	Ryan	Pupil	2x03-2x06	2014

=== Guest characters ===
Character	Actor/Actress	Profession	Duration	Year
Mr. Rupesh	Kulvinder Ghir	Bus Driver	1x06	2013
Fenella Forbes	Morgana Robinson	Author	2x01	2014
Dr. Dalton	Jimmy Akingbola	Geography Teacher	2x02	2014
Trish	Karen Taylor	—N/a	2x03	2014
Ms Steele	Sylvestra Le Touzel	Ofsted Inspector	2x04	2014
Dean	Jack Carroll	Pupil	2x05	2014
Rita Gunn	Michele Dotrice	Retired (presumed)	2x06	2014

== Episodes ==
=== Series overview ===
Series	Episodes	Originally released	
Series	Episodes	First released	Last released
1	6	16 August 2013	20 September 2013
2	6	29 August 2014	10 October 2014

=== Series 1 (2013) ===
No. overall	No. in season	Title	Directed by	Written by	Original release date	UK viewers (millions)
1	1	"Episode 1"	Tony Dow	David Walliams & Dawson Bros.	16 August 2013	5.28
Mr Keith Church decides it's his time to leave the school as none of his pupils seem interested, but the arrival of a new, young, French teacher Sarah Postern has him change his mind; however, the new teacher is catching the eye of all the staff. Meanwhile, the pupils decide to play a prank on Mr Barber, with a slightly imaginative picture.
2	2	"Episode 2"	Tony Dow	David Walliams & Dawson Bros.	23 August 2013	4.50
The school decides to hold a staff talent show; however, some of the staff's 'talents' are not as amazing as hoped. Keith decides that if he performs with Sarah they may get 'closer'. Meanwhile, the students decide to play judge, giving the best Simon Cowell impression they can muster when commenting on the quality of the teachers acts.
3	3	"Episode 3"	Tony Dow	David Walliams & Dawson Bros.	30 August 2013	3.68
Sarah is landed with running the draughts club and suggests merging with Keith's chess club, creating the school's first 'chaughts' club. She goes to his place to discuss a merger and watch Strictly, but Keith is about to regret his first attempt at social networking. Meanwhile, a drugs scandal looms when gym teacher Trevor Gunn is seen with a dealer.
4	4	"Episode 4"	Tony Dow	David Walliams & Dawson Bros.	6 September 2013	2.89
Sarah warns the other teachers to be careful around troubled student Josh, whose mother has run off and divorced his father whilst on holiday in Kenya to fall in love with a Masai tribesman. Keith is fired from the job as theatre critic for the school, and so Sarah has to watch Mrs Klebb's production of "Juliet & Romeo", taking Josh's dad with her. Could Keith be... jealous?
5	5	"Episode 5"	Tony Dow	David Walliams & Dawson Bros.	13 September 2013	2.93
Sarah puts herself down for an Ironman competition, but realises all too late what is involved. Trevor offers to help her train, and Keith tags along, taking an unusual interest in PE suddenly. Mrs Klebb tries to stop violence at school, but the teachers aren't listening. Meanwhile, Mr Barber has taught the wrong Geography course.
6	6	"Episode 6"	Tony Dow	David Walliams & Dawson Bros.	20 September 2013	3.85
Keith bargains his way onto Sarah's school trip to France, and events on tour do not go as planned for the staff.

=== Series 2 (2014) ===
No. overall	No. in season	Title	Directed by	Written by	Original release date	UK viewers (millions)
7	1	"Episode 1"	Matt Lipsey	David Walliams & Dawson Bros.	29 August 2014	2.90
When Miss Postern sets up a careers workshop, it seems her 'Which Way Now?' slogan applies as much to her as it does her pupils.
8	2	"Episode 2"	Matt Lipsey	David Walliams & Dawson Bros.	5 September 2014	2.60
It's Miss Postern's birthday and she is upset when everyone forgets. But the arrival of a new teacher (who just happens to be blind) changes everything and puts her day into a different light. Mr Church and Mr Gunn hear this news and are not happy about it.
9	3	"Episode 3"	Matt Lipsey	David Walliams & Dawson Bros.	12 September 2014	2.30
It's parents' evening and all the staff want to make sure it is over before the new episode of 'Great British Bake Off'. Mr Gunn thinks that he has a secret child at the school, and sets out to make his days as fun as possible. Miss Postern struggles to stop people looking at her cleavage and is told by Ms Baron (who tries to avoid the event all together) that she is a "Parisian prostitute".
10	4	"Episode 4"	Matt Lipsey	David Walliams & Dawson Bros.	19 September 2014	2.60
When Ofsted arrive to conduct an impromptu inspection, Greybridge School is thrown into even more chaos than usual.
11	5	"Episode 5"	Matt Lipsey	David Walliams & Dawson Bros.	3 October 2014	2.40
The staff celebrate when Mr Hubble chalks up 40 years of service at Greybridge School—although no sooner has he accepted his gift, he drops dead without anyone realising. When Mr Gunn and Mr Church finally cotton on, it's left to the bumbling duo to get the body out of the school before anyone else notices. Meanwhile, Miss Postern has a new poster boy for her anti-bullying campaign—a disabled boy who was moved from his last school because of intimidation. But the well-meaning French teacher soon discovers nothing is as it seems.
12	6	"Episode 6"	Matt Lipsey	David Walliams & Dawson Bros.	10 October 2014	N/A
A homeless Mr Barber spends the night in the school, only for disaster to strike when he causes a fire in Miss Postern's classroom. It falls on the reluctant Mr Gunn to put a roof over his head. The disaster is good news for Mr Church, as Miss Postern moves into his laboratory while her room is redecorated—but they soon find sharing doesn't come naturally.

Overnight ratings are not official and do not include views on BBC iPlayer, BBC HD or recorded catch-up services. They are just a note of the number of viewers on the BBC channel at the time of airing, and therefore are not an accurate representation. Official accurate figures are released 10 days after original transmission by BARB.

== Reception ==
The series was met with mixed feedback. Dan Owen of MSN described it as "An amusing and pleasant way to spend 30 minutes", and The Guardian said of Walliams: "This performance, and his writing, gives the show good jokes and heart."

There was negative feedback to the opening of the series, with The Daily Telegraph stating: "A bit tired, perhaps, the school thing, but surely a straightforward setting for a sitcom" before concluding "Let's just put it this way: amusing it was not. Mission aborted." MSN UK said, "Like most BBC comedies aiming to please mass audiences, there were plenty of moments that didn't work, but the writing avoided being outright terrible. A family show like this (even one inexplicably broadcast post-watershed) simply can't please everyone all the time".

The series opened to 4.2m viewers. The second instalment scored 3.63m (17.4%) for BBC One, making it the most watched programme of prime time outside of the soaps and news for the night.

== DVD release ==
The first series of Big School was released on DVD on 23 September 2013.

The second and final series was released on DVD on 13 October 2014.
