= Dawson Bros. =

Team of British comedy writers

Dawson Bros. are a team of British comedy writers, consisting of brothers Steve Dawson and Andrew Dawson and their childhood friend Tim Inman. They have written on a wide range of award-winning narrative and entertainment shows including That Mitchell and Webb Look, MTV Europe Music Awards, Total Wipeout, The Jonathan Ross Show, Take Me Out, The BRIT Awards, Happy Finish, Skins, The Peter Serafinowicz Show, Derren Brown's Trick or Treat, Balls of Steel, The Friday Night Project, The Royal Variety Performance, Ant & Dec's Saturday Night Takeaway and I'm a Celebrity...Get Me Out of Here!. They regularly contribute centrepiece sketches to Children in Need, Sport Relief and Comic Relief – such as the Fantastic Beasts and Where to Find Them sketch for Children in Need 2016 and the Some Mothers Do 'Ave 'Em sketch starring Michael Crawford for Sport Relief 2016. They also wrote for BBC One's The One Ronnie, notably the Blackberry Sketch.

In 2012 they authored their own BBC Three sketch show Dawson Bros. Funtime featuring YouTube stars Chris Kendall (aka crabstickz) and Jenny Bede, alongside comedy performers Mike Wozniak and Cariad Lloyd, and featuring the voice of Peter Serafinowicz.

Dawson Bros. were staff writers for Funny or Die UK and also produce an occasional series of web animations called "I'd Like To Have Been In That Meeting..." with animator Richard Whitelock and comic performers Dan Benoliel and Jonny Donahoe, friends from Abingdon School during the 1990s. One of the animations features the voice of Dana Snyder.

In 2013 they co-wrote the BBC One sitcom Big School, alongside David Walliams. The series aired across August and September of that year and was the second-highest rating sitcom debut in a decade. It was subsequently recommissioned and the second series aired in Autumn 2014.

Working with David Walliams again, Dawson Bros. co-created and co-wrote the BBC One sketch show Walliams & Friend in 2015. A Christmas special starring Joanna Lumley aired on Christmas Eve that year to six million viewers, making it the second most-watched sketch show on British TV in the 2010s. That was followed by a full series run in 2016 featuring Jack Whitehall, Harry Enfield, Sheridan Smith, Meera Syal, Miranda Richardson and Hugh Bonneville. They also created the ‘After Ever After’ franchise, Sky Max’s popular anthology of feature-length fairytale sequels.

More recently they have written screenplays for Working Title Films and Esperanto Filmoj and, in 2022, were co-producers and on-set writers for Judd Apatow's movie The Bubble. Their first feature film Fackham Hall, a spoof of period dramas co-written with Jimmy Carr and Patrick Carr and starring Damian Lewis, Thomasin McKenzie and Tom Felton, was released in cinemas in the UK and US in December 2025.
