= Ray Butt =

English television producer and director (1935–2013)

- Born: Raymond William Butt; 25 June 1935; London, England
- Died: 12 July 2013 (aged 78); Suffolk, England
- Occupations: Television producer; director
- Notable work: Are You Being Served?; Last of the Summer Wine; Only Fools and Horses
- Partner: Jo Blyth
- Children: 1

Raymond William Butt (25 June 1935 – 12 July 2013) was an English television producer and director. He worked on several sitcoms for BBC television and is best known for Only Fools and Horses.

== Early life ==
Butt was born Raymond William Butt in London on 25 June 1935. He grew up in London as an only child with his mother and father. He left school at 16 and served in the Royal Air Force for his National Service.

== Career ==
Butt produced Only Fools and Horses until Series 5, directing most episodes himself, when he moved onto new projects. He also worked on Last of the Summer Wine and Are You Being Served?. Butt directed the 1976 two-part episode from Last of the Summer Wine's third series consisting of the episodes, "The Great Boarding House Bathroom Caper" and "Cheering up Gordon." Butt would also serve as primary producer for Are You Being Served? between 1975 and 1977. He frequently collaborated with writer John Sullivan, directing for four different series written by Sullivan.

Butt retired in 1989. He received two BAFTAs, one for Only Fools and Horses and one for Just Good Friends.

== Death ==
Butt died in Suffolk on 12 July 2013 and was survived by his partner, Jo Blyth, and a daughter from an earlier marriage.

== Filmography ==
- The Liver Birds (1969–1979)
- Are You Being Served? (1975–1977)
- Last of the Summer Wine (1976)
- Citizen Smith (1977–1979)
- Only Fools and Horses (1981–1987)
- Just Good Friends (1983–1984)
- Dear John (1986-1987)
- Young, Gifted and Broke (1989)
- Sob Sisters (1989)
