= Only Fools and Horses =

British television sitcom (1981–2003)

- Genre: Sitcom
- Created by: John Sullivan
- Written by: John Sullivan
- Directed by: Martin Shardlow (1981); Bernard Thompson (1981); Ray Butt (1981–1983, 1985–1987); Susan Belbin (1985); Mandie Fletcher (1986); Tony Dow (1988–2003)
- Starring: David Jason; Nicholas Lyndhurst; Lennard Pearce; Buster Merryfield; Tessa Peake-Jones; Gwyneth Strong; Roger Lloyd-Pack; John Challis; Paul Barber; Roy Heather; Patrick Murray; Sue Holderness; Kenneth MacDonald
- Theme music composer: Ronnie Hazlehurst (1981); John Sullivan (1982–2003)
- Opening theme: "Only Fools and Horses Theme (Why Do Only Fools and Horses Work?)"
- Ending theme: "Hooky Street"
- Country of origin: United Kingdom
- Original language: English
- No. of series: 7
- No. of episodes: 64 (list of episodes)

Production
- Executive producers: Ray Butt (1981–1987); Bernard Thompson (1981); Gareth Gwenlan (1988–2003); John Sullivan (1991–2003)
- Production locations: BBC Television Centre, White City, London; Acton, London (1981–1988); Bristol (1988–2003)
- Editor: John Jarvis (1981–1996)
- Running time: Regular episodes: Series 1–5: 30 minutes Series 6–7: 50 minutes Christmas specials: 35–95 minutes
- Production company: BBC

Original release
- Network: BBC One
- Release: 8 September 1981 – 29 December 1996
- Release: 25 December 2001 – 25 December 2003

Related
- The Green Green Grass; Rock & Chips; Only Fools and Horses The Musical

Only Fools and Horses is a British television sitcom created and written by John Sullivan. Seven series and sixteen Christmas specials were originally broadcast on BBC One in the United Kingdom from 1981 to 1996, with a final trilogy of specials aired between 2001 and 2003. Set in working-class Peckham in south-east London, it stars David Jason as ambitious market trader "Del Boy" Derek Trotter and Nicholas Lyndhurst as his younger half-brother Rodney Trotter, alongside a supporting cast. The series follows the Trotters' highs and lows in life, in particular their attempts to get rich.

Lennard Pearce starred in the first three series as Del and Rodney's Grandad. After Pearce's death in 1984, a new character was introduced – Uncle Albert, Grandad’s estranged brother, played by Buster Merryfield. From 1988, the show featured regular characters in Del Boy's and Rodney's love interests: Raquel (Tessa Peake-Jones) and Cassandra (Gwyneth Strong), respectively. Other recurring characters included car dealer Boycie (John Challis), road sweeper Trigger (Roger Lloyd-Pack), lorry driver Denzil (Paul Barber), spiv Mickey Pearce (Patrick Murray), Boycie's wife Marlene (Sue Holderness), and pub landlord Mike (Kenneth MacDonald).

The series was not an immediate hit with viewers and received little promotion early on, but later achieved consistently high ratings, and the 1996 episode "Time on Our Hands" (originally billed as the series finale) holds the record for the biggest UK audience for a sitcom episode, attracting 24.3 million viewers. The series influenced British culture, contributing several words and phrases to the English language. It spawned an extensive range of merchandise, including books, videos, DVDs, toys, and board games. The series received numerous awards, including recognition from BAFTA, the National Television Awards, and the Royal Television Society, as well as winning individual accolades for both Sullivan and Jason. It was voted Britain's Best Sitcom in a 2004 BBC poll. Episodes are frequently repeated on UKTV comedy channel U&Gold.

Various further media were produced, including a spin-off, The Green Green Grass (2005–2009); prequel, Rock & Chips (2010–2011); and a special Sport Relief episode in March 2014, guest-starring David Beckham. In February 2019, a musical adaptation, written by John Sullivan's son Jim Sullivan and Paul Whitehouse, launched at the Theatre Royal Haymarket, London.

== Plot ==
"Del Boy" Derek Trotter (David Jason), a South London "fly" trader, lives in a council flat in Nelson Mandela House, a high-rise tower block in Peckham, South London, with his much younger half-brother, Rodney (Nicholas Lyndhurst), and their elderly grandfather, Grandad (Lennard Pearce). Their mother, Joan, died when Rodney was young, and their father Reg absconded soon afterwards, so Del Boy became Rodney's surrogate father and the family leader. Despite their differences in age, personality and outlook, the brothers share a constant bond throughout.

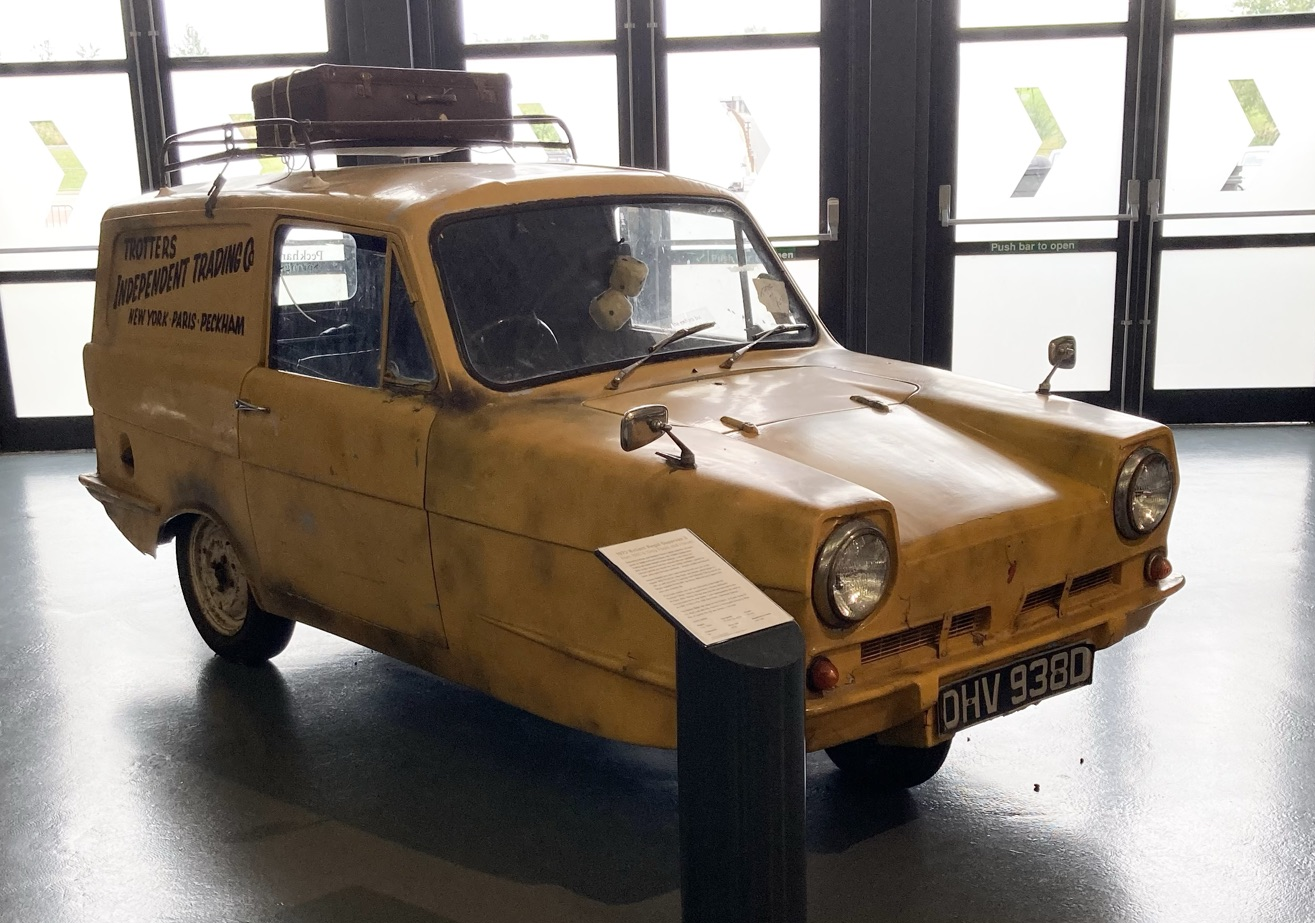
A Reliant Regal that was used in the series, on display at the British Motor Museum

The Trotters attempt to become millionaires through questionable get-rich-quick schemes and by buying and selling poor-quality and illegal goods. They have a three-wheeled Reliant Regal van and trade under the name of Trotters Independent Traders, mainly on the black market.

Initially, Del Boy, Rodney and Grandad were the only regulars, alongside the occasional appearances of road sweeper Trigger (Roger Lloyd-Pack) and pretentious used car salesman Boycie (John Challis). Over time, the cast expanded, mostly in the form of regulars at the local pub The Nag's Head. These included pub landlord Mike Fisher (Kenneth MacDonald), lorry driver Denzil (Paul Barber), youthful spiv Mickey Pearce (Patrick Murray) and Boycie's flirtatious wife Marlene (Sue Holderness). After Grandad died following the death of actor Lennard Pearce, his younger brother Uncle Albert (Buster Merryfield) was introduced and moved in with Del Boy and Rodney, becoming a main character.

The plots of many early episodes were primarily self-contained, with few plot-lines mentioned again, but the show developed a story arc and an ongoing episodic dimension in later series. Del Boy and Rodney's quest for love is a recurring theme, which eventually resulted in them finding long-term love in the form of Raquel (Tessa Peake-Jones) and Cassandra (Gwyneth Strong), respectively; Del Boy also has a son with Raquel, Damien (played by five actors, most recently Ben Smith), while Rodney has a daughter with Cassandra, Joan (named after his and Del Boy's mother), born in the final episode.

== Cast and characters ==
=== Main cast and characters ===
- "Del Boy" Derek Trotter (David Jason) – Del Boy is a smooth-talking South London market trader, willing to sell anything to anyone to make money. Possessing a quick wit and confidence that his younger brother mostly lacks, Del Boy is devoted to his family, taking care of Rodney and Grandad on his own from the age of 16. He is also known for his penchant for cultural faux pas, in particular his misuse of French phrases. Del Boy never settled down with a woman until he met Raquel, with whom he had a son, Damien.

Sullivan recalled that he had always been fascinated by the unlicensed traders who sold goods from suitcases in markets, and he based Del Boy on them. David Jason added other elements to the part, including Del Boy's cheap gold jewellery and his camel coat. The inspiration was taken from a similar man he had known when working as an electrician. Jason was a relatively late candidate for the part: Jim Broadbent (who would later appear in a minor recurring role as DCI Roy Slater) and Enn Reitel were earlier preferences. At that time Broadbent was appearing in Mike Leigh's play Goose-Pimples at the Hampstead Theatre in north London. The play was due to transfer to the West End; consequently Broadbent thought he would be unable to fit in with the filming schedule, and turned down the part. It was only when producer Ray Butt saw a repeat of Open All Hours that Jason was considered and, despite concerns that Jason had not previously had a leading television role and that he and Lyndhurst did not look like brothers, he was cast.

- Rodney Charlton Trotter (Nicholas Lyndhurst) – Rodney is Del Boy's idealistic but socially awkward younger brother. Despite being more academically gifted than Del Boy (although only to the extent of two GCEs), Rodney lacks Del Boy's charisma as well as the latter's duplicitous persona, and as such is confined to being Del Boy's dogsbody and sidekick. Orphaned at a young age, Rodney was raised by Del Boy, and much of the friction between the two comes from Rodney's annoyance about his dependency on his brother and his sometimes immoral schemes, usually resulting in unsuccessful attempts to gain greater independence through girlfriends or through setting up his own businesses; he was only partially successful after marrying Cassandra and briefly going to work for her father. In contrast to Del Boy, the part of Rodney was cast early, with Lyndhurst settled on quickly. Sullivan partly based Rodney on his own experiences: he, too, had a much older sibling and, like Rodney, claims to have been a dreamer and an idealist in his youth.
- Edward Kitchener "Grandad" Trotter (Lennard Pearce) – Sullivan was fascinated by the idea of having a big age gap between Del Boy and his younger brother Rodney; the elderly character of Grandad, and later, Uncle Albert, gave the situation the voice of an "old man who had seen it all". In casting the role of Grandad, Sullivan had in mind an actor similar to Wilfrid Brambell, who had played Albert Steptoe in Steptoe and Son, but chose not to cast Brambell himself, thinking him too closely associated with Steptoe. After seeing Pearce's audition, Sullivan chose him immediately. Unkempt and absent-minded, although sometimes displaying a high intelligence, Grandad rarely left the flat or even moved from his armchair in front of two television sets. He was often assigned the job of cooking meals, despite his notoriously poor cooking skills, which Del Boy describes as his "role in the family circle" to ensure he still "feels needed". Pearce died in 1984 during the filming of the fourth series and Sullivan wrote a new episode, "Strained Relations", to write Grandad's death into the series.
- Albert Gladstone Trotter (Buster Merryfield) – Shortly after the death of Lennard Pearce, it was decided that a new older family member should be brought in, which eventually led to "Uncle Albert", Grandad's estranged younger brother. Merryfield was an inexperienced amateur actor at the time, but was selected because he appeared to fit the description of an old sailor, especially with his distinctive white "Captain Birdseye" beard. Albert first appeared at Grandad's funeral and soon moved in with Del Boy and Rodney. His wartime experiences with the Royal Navy became one of the show's running gags, usually beginning with the words "During the war...". Merryfield died in 1999, and Albert's death was written into the next episode.
- Raquel Turner (Tessa Peake-Jones) – Raquel was introduced because Sullivan wanted more female characters and for Del Boy to start meeting more mature women. Her first appearance, in "Dates", was intended to be a one-off, but she was written in again a year later and thereafter became a permanent cast member. A trained singer and actress whose career never took off, she met Del Boy through a dating agency, but they fell out over her part-time job as a stripper, before getting together again. This time she moved in with Del Boy, helping to calm him, and they had a son together, named Damien. As the character developed, it was revealed that she was previously married to Del Boy's nemesis, Roy Slater.
- Cassandra Trotter (née Parry) (Gwyneth Strong) – Cassandra first met Rodney in "Yuppy Love". Their relationship blossomed, and by the end of series six, the two had married. Cassandra's career-driven lifestyle caused fights with Rodney, and their marriage problems formed one of the main storylines in the seventh series.

=== Supporting cast and characters ===
- Trigger (Roger Lloyd-Pack) – A dopey and slow-witted but good friend of Del Boy, Trigger was initially portrayed as a small-time thief, supplying Del Boy with dubious goods. In later episodes, he came to adopt the "village idiot" role and constantly calls Rodney "Dave", much to Rodney's annoyance. Trigger, apparently so called because he looks like a horse, was the principal supporting character earlier in the show's run, although his importance lessened as the series progressed. Lloyd-Pack was cast by pure chance: Ray Butt, who hired him to portray Trigger after seeing him in a stage play, had only attended that play to observe potential Del Boy actor Billy Murray.
- Boycie (John Challis) – An untrustworthy used car salesman and a cultural elitist (though he seemingly grew up working class, like Del Boy). Boycie, a freemason, was very selfish and prone to boasting about his wealth. Challis had played a similar character in an episode of Citizen Smith. Sullivan liked him, and promised to cast him in a future series, which led to Boycie. Boycie later featured in a spin-off series, The Green Green Grass, starting in 2005, in which he, his wife Marlene and their son Tyler move to a farm in the country to escape the Driscoll brothers.
- Denzil Tulser (Paul Barber) – An affable Liverpudlian lorry driver, Denzil was often the victim of Del Boy's scams. His inability to say no to Del Boy's business deals frequently led to arguments with his controlling wife, Corinne (Eva Mottley). Corinne eventually walked out on him, leaving Denzil depressed but with more time to go along with Del Boy's antics.
- Sid (Roy Heather) – Sid made sparse appearances throughout the show's run, mainly as the proprietor of the dirty and unhygienic local cafe. In the episode "The Jolly Boys' Outing", it is revealed that Sid fought in the Second World War. He was captured and imprisoned but escaped, only for the boat he was using to be hit and sunk by a Greek fishing trawler being steered by Uncle Albert. After Nag's Head landlord Mike was imprisoned, Sid took over and kept that role for the remainder of the series.
- Mickey Pearce (Patrick Murray) – Mickey was a young, arrogant spiv and friend of Rodney's, known for his exaggerated boasts about his success in business or with women. Despite their friendship, Mickey often took advantage of Rodney's inexperience by stealing his girlfriends or making off with all the money from their business partnership.
- Marlene Boyce (Sue Holderness) – Boycie's wife. Initially just an unseen character, Marlene was popular among the men and extremely flirtatious, having (it is implied) had sexual relations with all of Boycie's friends. She and Del Boy have a noticeably close friendship, dating back to when Marlene worked in a betting shop in Lewisham Grove. Despite their constant arguments and insults, she and Boycie are in love and eventually have a child, Tyler, after several years of trying although there are light-hearted rumours that Del Boy may be the father.
- Mike Fisher (Kenneth MacDonald) – The landlord of the Nag's Head, although not from the very beginning; his predecessor was never seen, with just a succession of barmaids providing service. Friendly and gormless, he was often targeted by Del Boy as a potential customer for any goods he was selling. When Kenneth MacDonald died in 2001, a storyline was written involving Mike's imprisonment for attempting to embezzle funds from the brewery, and cafe owner Sid took over as the interim pub landlord.
- Damien Trotter (various) – Damien was Del Boy and Raquel's son. It was Rodney's mocking suggestion that he be named Damien. Uncle Albert raised concern that Damien's initials would read "DDT", as his full name is "Damien Derek Trotter", "DDT" being short for the chemical compound Dichlorodiphenyltrichloroethane DDT. Six actors played Damien: Patrick McManus (1991), Grant Stevens (1991), Robert Liddement (1992), Jamie Smith (1993–96), Douglas Hodge (1996, as adult) and Ben Smith (2001–03).

=== Minor cast and characters ===
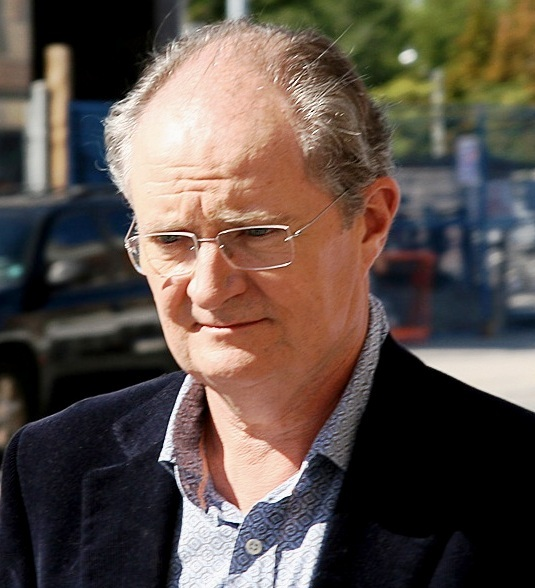
Jim Broadbent, who was originally considered to play Del Boy, made three appearances as DCI Roy Slater.

The most frequent roles for guest actors in Only Fools and Horses were as Del Boy's or Rodney's one-time girlfriends, barmaids at the Nag's Head, or individuals the Trotters were doing business with. Del Boy's and Rodney's deceased mother, Joan, though never seen, was frequently mentioned in Del Boy's embellished accounts of her final words or in his attempts to emotionally blackmail Rodney. Her grave, a flamboyant monument, was seen occasionally. Their absent father, Reg, appeared once in "Thicker Than Water" (played by Peter Woodthorpe), before leaving under a cloud, never to be seen again. Other members of the Trotter family were rarely sighted, the exceptions being cousins Stan (Mike Kemp) and Jean (Maureen Sweeney), who attended Grandad's funeral. In "The Second Time Around", the woman they believed to be Auntie Rose (Beryl Cooke) turned out to be no relation at all but the woman who had moved into Rose's house some years earlier. After Rodney met Cassandra, her parents Alan (Denis Lill) and Pam (Wanda Ventham) became recurring characters. Raquel's parents, James and Audrey (Michael Jayston and Ann Lynn), appeared in "Time On Our Hands", and it was James who discovered the antique watch which made the Trotters millionaires.

In some episodes, a guest character was essential to the plot. Del Boy's ex-fiancée Pauline (Jill Baker) dominated Del Boy's libido in "The Second Time Around", prompting Rodney and Grandad to leave. In "Who Wants to Be a Millionaire", Del Boy's old business partner Jumbo Mills (Nick Stringer) wanted Del Boy to return to Australia with him and restore their partnership, forcing Del Boy to make a decision. In "Happy Returns", Del Boy stops a young boy from running into the road and takes him home to his mother, only to discover she is an old flame from nineteen years ago, June Snell (Diane Langton); the episode revolves around whether June's daughter Debby (Oona Kirsch) is actually Del Boy's child, complicated by the fact that Rodney is dating her. June also appears in "A Royal Flush", attending an opera. An attempt by Lennox (Vas Blackwood) to rob a local supermarket set up the "hostage" situation in "The Longest Night". Del Boy and Rodney spent the whole of "Tea for Three" battling each other for the affections of Trigger's niece Lisa (Gerry Cowper), who briefly reappeared in "The Frog's Legacy". Abdul (Tony Anholt) in "To Hull and Back" and Arnie (Philip McGough) in "Chain Gang" were responsible for setting up dubious enterprises involving the Trotters in their respective episodes. Tony Angelino (Philip Pope), the "singing dustman" with a speech impediment, was the key to the humour and the storyline of "Stage Fright", and EastEnders actor Derek Martin guest-starred in "Fatal Extraction".

Del Boy's nemesis from his school days, corrupt policeman Roy Slater (played by Jim Broadbent), made three appearances, in "May The Force Be With You", "To Hull and Back" and "Class of '62". Feared local villains, Danny and Tony Driscoll (Roy Marsden and Christopher Ryan, respectively) featured once, in "Little Problems", but were mentioned in two previous episodes ("Video Nasty" and "The Frog's Legacy"), and are important in the story of The Green Green Grass. An adult Damien (Douglas Hodge) appeared in "Heroes and Villains". Rodney and Mickey's friends, the smooth-talking Jevon (Steven Woodcock) and then, briefly, Chris (Tony Marshall), a ladies' hairdresser, featured sporadically during the sixth and seventh series and the intervening Christmas specials. The two-part 1991 Christmas special, "Miami Twice", saw Richard Branson and Barry Gibb make cameo appearances. Mike Read appeared as himself, hosting an episode of Top Of The Pops, in "It's Only Rock and Roll" and Jonathan Ross appeared as himself in "If They Could See Us Now".

While their characters were less significant, well-known actors who played cameos in the programme included Joan Sims, best known for her numerous roles in the Carry On films, who guest-starred in the feature-length episode "The Frog's Legacy" as Reenie Turpin, an aunt of Trigger and old friend of Del Boy's late mother; successful film actor David Thewlis, who played a young wannabe musician in "It's Only Rock and Roll"; John Bardon, who played the role of Jim Branning in the soap opera EastEnders, appeared as the supermarket security officer Tom Clark in "The Longest Night". Walter Sparrow, who appeared as Dirty Barry in "Danger UXD", went on to appear in several Hollywood films.

There were also several off-screen characters mentioned throughout the history of the show, including 'Monkey' Harris, Paddy the Greek, 'Sunglasses' Ron, Lenny Norris, and Ronnie Nelson.

== Production ==
=== Development ===
The original Only Fools and Horses line-up of (left to right) Grandad (Lennard Pearce), Del Boy (David Jason) and Rodney (Nicholas Lyndhurst) lasted from 1981 to 1984.

In 1980, John Sullivan, a scriptwriter under contract at the BBC, was already well known as the writer of the sitcom Citizen Smith. It came to an end that year and Sullivan was searching for a new project. An initial idea for a comedy set in the world of football was rejected by the BBC, as was his alternative idea, a sitcom centring on a cockney market trader in working class, modern-day London. The latter idea persisted. Through Ray Butt, a BBC producer and director whom Sullivan had met and become friends with when they were working on Citizen Smith, a draft script was shown to the BBC's Head of Comedy, John Howard Davies. Davies commissioned Sullivan to write a full series. Sullivan believed the key factor in its being accepted was the success of ITV's new drama Minder, a series with a similar premise and also set in modern-day London.

Sullivan had initially given the show the working title Readies. He eventually chose Only Fools and Horses, as a reference to the protagonist's tax-and-work-evading lifestyle. That name was based on a genuine, though very obscure, saying, "only fools and horses work for a living", which had its origins in 19th-century American vaudeville. "Only Fools and Horses" had also been the title of an episode of Citizen Smith, and Sullivan liked the expression and thought it was suited to the new sitcom. He also thought longer titles would attract attention. He was first overruled on the grounds that the audience would not understand the title, but he eventually got his way.

=== Filming and transmission ===
The second Only Fools and Horses line-up of (left to right) Del Boy (David Jason), Rodney (Nicholas Lyndhurst) and Uncle Albert (Buster Merryfield) lasted from 1985 to 1996. Picture taken from the show's special "Jolly Boys Outing" with the trio outside the Villa Bella in Margate.

Filming of the first series began in May 1981, and the first episode, "Big Brother", was transmitted on BBC1 at 8:30 pm on 8 September that year. It attracted 9.2 million viewers and generally received a lukewarm response from critics. The viewing figures for the whole first series averaged at around seven million viewers. According to an interview with John Challis in 2015, the viewing figure "today would be very good but in those days wasn't considered great at all, so it was sort of put on the back burner for a bit – no particular plans for a second series". The costumes for the first series were designed by Phoebe De Gaye. Del Boy's attire was inspired by her going to car boot sales. She took Jason shopping in Oxford Street and had him try a variety of suits. De Gaye purchased some gaily coloured Gabicci shirts, which were fashionable at the time and she thought "horrible". Del Boy's rings and bracelet were made of fake gold and came from Chapel Market. Rodney's combat jacket came from the BBC's Costume Department, and De Gaye added a Yasser Arafat scarf purchased from Shepherd's Bush Market. De Gaye used Vaseline, make-up and food to make Grandad's costume look dirty. The idea was that he never had his hat off, never dressed properly and usually wore dirty pyjamas underneath his clothes.

A second series was commissioned for 1982. The first two series were repeated in June 1983 in a less prominent timeslot, attracting sufficient viewers for Davies to commission a third series. The programme then began to top the television ratings. Viewing figures for the fourth series were double those of the first. Gilly Flower and Renee Roberts guest-starred as their Fawlty Towers characters Miss Abitha Tibbs and Miss Ursula Gatsby in the episode "Homesick". In early December 1984, during the filming of Series 4, Lennard Pearce suffered a heart attack and was taken to hospital. He died on 15 December, the day before he was due to return. Sullivan wrote Grandad's death into the series with the episode "Strained Relations" which featured Del Boy’s and Rodney's goodbye to Grandad. According to Sullivan, recasting Grandad was considered disrespectful to Pearce by the team, so it was decided that another older family member was to be cast. Buster Merryfield was then cast as Grandad's brother Albert. The scenes from "Hole in One" that featured Pearce were re-filmed with Merryfield.

Midway through the filming of the fifth series, Jason told Sullivan that he wished to leave the show in order to further his career elsewhere. Sullivan thus wrote "Who Wants to Be a Millionaire?", which was intended to be the final episode and would see Del Boy accepting a friend's offer to set up business in Australia, leaving Rodney and Albert behind. Plans were made for a spin-off, Hot-Rod, which would have followed Rodney's attempts to survive on his own with help from Mickey Pearce but leaving open the prospect of Del Boy's return. Jason then changed his mind, and the ending of the episode was changed to show Del Boy rejecting the offer.

Sullivan had a tendency to write scripts that were too long, leading to material being cut. Shortly before filming of the sixth series began, he and Jason requested that the show's time slot be extended and it was agreed to extend its running time to 50 minutes. This required a 40 per cent increase in the show's budget, and coincided with the show becoming one of the BBC's most popular programmes. Robin Stubbs became the costume designer for the sixth series and was responsible for getting Del Boy's attire to match his new yuppy image. His new suits cost around £200 each and were purchased from Austin Reed in Regent Street. The rest came from stores such as Tie-Rack and Dickins & Jones. His jewellery was replaced in each series because it was very cheap (the "D" rings cost 50p each).

The seventh series aired in early 1991. Jason and Sullivan were involved with other projects, and it was confirmed that there were no plans for a new series. Despite this, the show continued in Christmas specials until 1993. Sullivan nonetheless wanted a final episode to tie up the show. In late 1996, three more one-hour episodes were filmed, to be broadcast over Christmas 1996. All three were well received and, due to the ending, were assumed to be the last. The show made a return in Christmas 2001 with the first of three new episodes which were shot together but ultimately broadcast over three consecutive Christmases from 2001 until 2003. Despite rumours of further episodes, in a 2008 interview, Sullivan was quoted as saying: "There will not be another series of Only Fools And Horses. I can say that. We had our day, it was wonderful but it is best to leave it now". Though Sullivan died in 2011, it returned for a special Sport Relief episode in 2014.

=== Theme music and titles ===
The images peeling away was conceived as a metaphor for the Trotters' lifestyle.

From the second series, Only Fools and Horses has separate theme songs for the opening and closing credits: "Only Fools and Horses" and "Hooky Street", respectively. The series 1 theme tune was produced by Ronnie Hazlehurst and recorded on 6 August 1981 at Lime Grove Studios. Alf Bigden, Paul Westwood, Don Hunt, John Dean, Judd Proctor, Eddie Mordue and Rex Morris were hired to play the music. The tune was changed after the first series, and the new one was written by John Sullivan (he disliked the tune for the first series, and his new one explained the show's title), and Hazlehurst conducted it. It was recorded at Lime Grove on 11 May 1982, with musicians John Horler, Dave Richmond, Bigden and Proctor. Sullivan had intended Chas & Dave to sing it because they had enjoyed success with the "Rockney" style, a mixture of rock n' roll and traditional Cockney music. Sullivan was persuaded to do it himself by Ray Butt. Despite the creation of a new theme tune, the original one remained in occasional use. Chas & Dave did later contribute to the show, performing the closing credits song for the 1989 episode "The Jolly Boys' Outing". Both songs are performed by Sullivan himself, and not – as is sometimes thought – by Nicholas Lyndhurst.

The opening credits see images of the three principal actors peel on and off the screen sequentially. These appear over a background of still photographs of everyday life in London. The sequence was conceived by graphic designer Peter Clayton as a "metaphor for the vagaries of the Trotters' lifestyle", whereby money was earned and quickly lost again. Clayton had also considered using five-pound notes bearing Del Boy's face. The action was shot manually frame by frame and took around six weeks to complete. Clayton knew that it was important to have the characters established in the titles and prepared a storyboard depicting his ideas using drawings. He photographed various locations with a photographer, and the titles were shot using a rostrum camera and not edited. Brian Stephens, a professional animator, was hired to create the labels' movement.

Clayton returned to the show when the closing credits were changed for "Christmas Crackers". He re-cut the entire sequence and added Christmas items. Another change was made necessary by Lennard Pearce's death and Buster Merryfield joining the cast, so the pictures of David Jason and Nicholas Lyndhurst were updated too. The sequence was shot on motor drive.

The closing credits for the programme varied series by series. The first series used peeling labels featuring the names of the cast and crew, mirroring the opening sequence, but these had to be updated with every new episode, making the process very time-consuming; from the second series, the credits switched to a standard rolling format. The third series featured additional symbols. For the fourth series, these designs were replaced with white lettering on a black background. The fifth series had a black and white background, but the sixth series reverted to the black one. For the seventh series, the credits scrolled against a freeze frame of the final scene.

=== Filming locations ===
The street market seen in the opening titles is Chapel Market in Islington, and the pub is The Alma, also in Chapel Market. Chapel Market is also seen in many early episodes.

The original "Nelson Mandela House" in the titles was Harlech Tower, Park Road East, Acton, London. From 1988 onwards, Whitemead House, Duckmoor Road, Ashton in Bristol was used. The tower block is located behind Ashton Gate, the home ground of both Bristol City Football Club and the Bristol Bears, with some scenes filmed in the stadium's car park.

The location used for exterior shots of the Trotter's local pub in the series, The Nag's Head, was The Middlesex Arms in South Ruislip. Grandad's funeral, in the Series 4 episode "Strained Relations", was filmed at Hammersmith Cemetery and Chapel, also known as Margravine Cemetery.

== Episodes ==
Sixty-four episodes of Only Fools and Horses, all written by John Sullivan, were broadcast on BBC1 from 8 September 1981 until 25 December 2003. The show was aired in seven series (1981–1983, 1985–1986, 1989 and 1990–1991), and thereafter in sporadic Christmas special editions (1991–1993, 1996, 2001–2003). The episodes from the first five series (excluding Christmas specials) had a running time of 30 minutes, but from series 6 (1989), the running time of the series episodes was extended to 50 minutes.

Several mini-episodes were produced. An eight-minute episode aired on 27 December 1982 as part of a show hosted by Frank Muir, The Funny Side of Christmas, and attracted 7.2 million viewers. A five-minute spoof BBC documentary was shown on Breakfast Time on 24 December 1985, with Del Boy being investigated by a BBC consumer expert. An educational episode named "Licensed to Drill", in which Del Boy, Rodney and Grandad discuss oil drilling, was recorded in 1984 but only shown in schools. A five-minute 1990–91 Persian Gulf War special (dated 1 December 1990) has Del Boy, Rodney and Albert convey a message to British troops serving in the conflict. It has never been broadcast commercially, but a copy exists at the Imperial War Museum, London. A Comic Relief special showing Del Boy, Rodney and Albert making an appeal for donations was shown on 14 March 1997, with 10.6 million viewers. A Sport Relief special was aired on 21 March 2014 which featured retired footballer David Beckham.

Only Fools and Horses had two producers: Ray Butt from 1981 to 1987, and Gareth Gwenlan thereafter. Seven directors were used: Martin Shardlow directed all episodes in series one, Bernard Thompson directed the 1981 Christmas special, Susan Belbin series four, and Mandie Fletcher series five. Butt directed series two, three and five, as well as the 1985, 1986 and 1987 Christmas specials. Tony Dow became the established director after 1988, directing all subsequent episodes, bar the first part of "Miami Twice", which was directed by Gareth Gwenlan. John Sullivan was executive producer on seven of the final eight episodes.

=== Documentaries ===
A BBC documentary titled The Story of Only Fools and Horses aired in December 2002. A six-part documentary series, also titled The Story of Only Fools and Horses, aired from 29 August to 3 October 2017 on Gold. The series features rare and unseen footage from the archives and specially re-created moments from Del Boy's family and friends. On 27 December 2020, a special called We Love Only Fools and Horses was broadcast on Channel 5 in which various fans, actors and crew recalled the story of the series and why the show is still popular. First broadcast on 24 December 2023 and repeated on 11 December 2024, Channel 5 aired the 2023 Studio Crook Production "Only Fools and Horses: Greatest Christmas Moments" in which the cast and fans share their favourite scenes from the Christmas specials.

A two-part documentary series titled Only Fools and Horses: The Lost Archive aired on UK channel U&Gold in October 2026 to mark the show’s 45th anniversary, it included never-before-seen footage and new interviews with cast members. During research for the documentary, producers identified 66 previously unseen clips and scenes that had been filmed for the sitcom but omitted from the original broadcasts. These included a previously lost nightclub opening from the episode "Class of '62" and unused footage from "The Jolly Boys' Outing" and "Time on our Hands".

== Spin-offs ==
=== The Green Green Grass ===
A spin-off of Only Fools and Horses, The Green Green Grass, also written by John Sullivan and directed by Tony Dow, was first aired in the UK in September 2005. Sullivan had considered writing a sitcom around the popular characters of Boycie and Marlene (John Challis and Sue Holderness) since the mid-1980s, but it was not until Only Fools And Horses ended that the idea came to fruition. The Green Green Grass saw Boycie and Marlene forced to leave Peckham by one-time Only Fools and Horses villains, the Driscoll Brothers, and included guest appearances by Denzil (Paul Barber) and Sid (Roy Heather). A second series of The Green Green Grass was broadcast in the UK in October 2006, a third in November 2007 and a fourth in January 2009.

=== Rock & Chips ===
In 2003, it was reported that Sullivan was developing a prequel to the original series, Once Upon a Time in Peckham, which would feature Del Boy as a youngster in the 1960s and have a prominent role for his parents. In 2009, it was again reported that the BBC were considering commissioning the show, although nothing was confirmed. On 5 April 2009, Sullivan said that he was planning a prequel to Only Fools and Horses which would star Nicholas Lyndhurst as Freddie "The Frog" Robdal, a local criminal and Rodney's biological father; Robdal was the focus of the episode "The Frog's Legacy".

On 3 July 2009, the BBC revealed that the title of the spin-off would be Sex, Drugs & Rock 'n' Chips, and would be a 90-minute comedy drama. The title was subsequently changed to Rock & Chips. Filming began in August 2009, and it was shown on BBC One at 9pm on 24 January 2010. In October 2009 it was confirmed that Lyndhurst would star as Robdal. The Inbetweeners and Off The Hook actor James Buckley played the role of the young Del Boy.

== Home media ==
The show has been released on VHS, DVD and audio CD in several guises. A DVD collection containing every episode was issued, alongside various other special-edition box sets, such as a tin based on their Reliant Regal. Videos and DVDs of Only Fools and Horses continue to be among the BBC's biggest-selling items, having sold more than 1 million VHS copies and 6 million DVD copies in the UK.

All seven series and the Christmas specials have been released on DVD in both individual and complete sets. The first three series each contained their Christmas specials from 1981, 1982 and 1983. The specials were omitted from all subsequent series sets but were instead released separately and not in chronological order. In addition, the documentary The Story of Only Fools and Horses was released in 2003.

The series made its debut on Blu-ray on 6 December 2021, with a three-disc set, Only Fools and Horses: The 80s Specials. It featured the five feature-length Christmas specials broadcast from 1985 to 1989, restored and remastered in high-definition. For the restoration process, the original 16 mm film elements were cleaned and rescanned, while the standard-definition videotape elements were "digitally reprocessed" and upscaled to HD. On the set, the episode "A Royal Flush" is featured both in its original and "writer's cut" versions; "The Jolly Boys' Outing" is fully uncut; and various photo galleries, a booklet and artcards are also included. It entered and peaked at #10 on the UK Official Blu-ray Chart the week ending 18 December 2021.

Overview
| Title | Release date | | Features | Ref. |
| Title | Region 2 | Region 4 | Features | Ref. |
|---|---|---|---|---|
| The Complete Series 1 | 20 November 2000 | 3 May 2004 | 6 episodes; & 1981 Christmas special; 1 disc; Subtitles: English SDH; BBFC: PG; ACB: PG; No special features | |
| The Complete Series 2 | 29 March 2001 | 3 May 2004 | 7 episodes; & 1982 Christmas special; 1 disc; Subtitles: English SDH; BBFC: PG; ACB: M; No special features | |
| The Complete Series 3 | 4 June 2001 | 5 May 2005 | 7 episodes; & 1983 Christmas special; 1 disc; Subtitles: English SDH; BBFC: PG; ACB: PG; No special features | |
| The Complete Series 4 | 1 October 2001 | 5 May 2005 | 7 episodes; 1 disc; Subtitles: English SDH; BBFC: PG; ACB: PG; No special features | |
| The Complete Series 5 | 30 September 2002 | 4 August 2005 | 6 episodes; 1 disc; Subtitles: English SDH; BBFC: PG; ACB: PG; No special features | |
| The Complete Series 6 | 22 September 2003 | 4 August 2005 | 6 episodes; 2 discs; Subtitles: English SDH; BBFC: PG; ACB: PG; No special features | |
| The Complete Series 7 | 6 September 2004 | 4 May 2006 | 6 episodes; 2 discs; Subtitles: English SDH; BBFC: PG; ACB: PG; No special features | |
| The Complete Series 1–7 | 15 November 2004 | —N/a | 45 episodes; & 1981, 1982 and 1983 Christmas specials; 9 discs; Subtitles: English SDH; BBFC: PG; No special features | |
| The Complete Collection | 16 October 2006 | 20 November 2019 | 64 episodes (including all Christmas specials); 26 discs (Region 2); 18 discs (Region 4); Subtitles: English SDH; BBFC: 12; ACB: M | |
| The Complete Series 1–7 (slimline reissue) | 27 September 2010 | —N/a | 45 episodes; & 1981, 1982 and 1983 Christmas specials; 9 discs; Subtitles: English SDH; BBFC: PG; No special features | |
| The Complete Collection (first reissue) | 5 September 2011 | —N/a | Repackaged version of original complete collection set; 64 episodes (including all Christmas specials); 26 discs; Subtitles: English SDH; BBFC: 12 | |
| The Complete Collection (second reissue) | 23 October 2017 | —N/a | Slimline version of first reissued complete collection set; 64 episodes (including all Christmas specials); 19 discs; Subtitles: English SDH; BBFC: 12 | |
Specials
| The Jolly Boys' Outing | 6 November 2000 | —N/a | | |
| The Frog's Legacy | 20 November 2000 | —N/a | | |
| To Hull and Back | 12 November 2001 | —N/a | | |
| Dates | 6 May 2002 | —N/a | | |
| If They Could See Us Now! | 11 November 2002 | —N/a | | |
| Miami Twice | 19 May 2003 | —N/a | | |
| Strangers on the Shore | 17 November 2003 | —N/a | | |
| Heroes and Villains | 9 February 2004 | —N/a | | |
| Modern Men | 9 February 2004 | —N/a | | |
| Time on Our Hands | 9 February 2004 | —N/a | | |
| The Christmas Trilogy | 9 February 2004 | 3 October 2007 | 3 episodes: "Heroes and Villains", "Modern Men" and "Time on Our Hands"; 3 discs; Subtitles: English SDH; BBFC: PG; ACB: PG | |
| Mother Nature's Son | 24 May 2004 | —N/a | | |
| Fatal Extraction | 12 July 2004 | —N/a | | |
| Sleepless in Peckham | 4 October 2004 | —N/a | | |
| The Christmas Specials | 15 November 2004 | —N/a | 3 episodes: "If They Could See Us Now!", "Strangers on the Shore" and "Sleepless in Peckham"; 3 discs; Subtitles: English SDH; BBFC: 12 | |
| Rodney Come Home | 14 February 2005 | —N/a | | |
| A Royal Flush | 9 May 2005 | —N/a | | |
| The 80s Specials (Blu-ray) | 22 November 2021 | —N/a | 5 episodes: "To Hull and Back", "A Royal Flush", "The Frog's Legacy", "Dates" and "The Jolly Boys' Outing"; 3 discs; Subtitles: English SDH; BBFC: PG; Special features: collector's booklet, five exclusive art cards, behind-the-scenes photo galleries, original and writer's cut version of "A Royal Flush" and fully restored version of "The Jolly Boys' Outing | |

== In other media ==
=== Audio releases ===
A number of episodes were re-edited for audio purposes and released on either audio cassette or CD. In total, there were five CDs released, with the first one being released on both CD and cassette.

An album was released in 2002. Only Fools and Horses: The Album featured songs used in the show, as well as John Sullivan performing the theme tune and "Hookie Street". Apart from the physical CD release, the album has never been available digitally, meaning that the theme tune has never appeared on streaming or download services as of 2025. A single was released to support the album, which sampled the show's theme tune, titled Del Boy's Tune. The music video features John Challis as Boycie and Patrick Murray as Mickey Pearce.

Before Euro 2004, an unofficial England song was released by Undercover. The track, "Viva England!", sampled both the opening theme from Only Fools and Horses and "Hookie Street" – used with John Sullivan's blessing – and reached number 49 in the charts.

=== Theatre ===
A four-minute show named "Royal Variety Performance" was shown on 27 November 1988 (viewed by 18.14 million people) and had Del Boy, Rodney, and Albert appear on the Royal Variety Show. It was staged on 24 November 1986, and the plot saw David Jason, Nicholas Lyndhurst and Buster Merryfield appear on stage in character, thinking that they are delivering boxes of alcohol to an associate of Del Boy's, only later realising where they actually are. They also mistake the Duchess of York for Del Boy's associate.

An idea of an Only Fools and Horses stage show was mooted by Ray Butt, following the success of other sitcom crossovers such as Dad's Army and Are You Being Served?. Sullivan was not keen, owing to his work on Just Good Friends as well as Only Fools and Horses, and inexperience with the theatre, so nothing came of it.

==== Stage musical ====
In July 2018, John Sullivan's son, Jim Sullivan, announced that an Only Fools and Horses musical was nearing completion, with a script by Jim Sullivan and Paul Whitehouse. Jim Sullivan said, "Back in 2010 my Dad had been toying with the possibility of a stage show but sadly didn't get the chance to commit to it. In 2015 we met with the producer, Phil McIntyre, and agreed to develop the idea. Soon after that, Paul Whitehouse came on board and things have been bubbling away ever since. I am very pleased and excited to say that the show will be launching early next year." The musical launched on 9 February 2019 at the Theatre Royal Haymarket, London.

=== Books ===
Only Fools and Horses spawned many merchandising spin-offs. Several books have been published, such as "The Only Fools and Horses Story" by Steve Clark and "The Complete A-Z of Only Fools and Horses" by Richard Webber, both of which detail the history of the series. The scripts have been published in a three-volume compendium, "The Bible of Peckham".

In October 2015, He Who Dares..., a fictional autobiography, was published by Ebury Press. The book was written by John Sullivan's son, Jim Sullivan.

In August 2017, Only Fools and Horses: The Peckham Archives, was published by Ebury Press. The book was written by Rod Green, with the help of Jim Sullivan.

In November 2018, You Know It Makes Sense, Lessons From The Derek Trotter School of Business (And Life), was published by Ebury Press. The book was written by John Sullivan's son, Jim Sullivan.

=== Board games ===
Two board games based on the show were released: a Monopoly-style game, the "Trotters Trading Game", in which participants attempt to emulate the Trotters and become millionaires, and another game set in their local pub, the "Nag's Head Board Game".

=== Games/apps ===
A CD-ROM was released in August 2000 by BBC Multimedia. It featured a calendar, a calculator, a pub quiz, numerous clips from the show and a driving game.

An app was released for mobile phones in 2010. The Only Fools & Horses Plonker Test app included a quiz, mini-games and audio clips from the show. It has since been discontinued.

== Reception ==
Del Boy's fall through an open bar-flap in "Yuppy Love" (BBC video clip) is one of the show's best-known moments.

Only Fools and Horses is one of the UK's most popular sitcoms. It was among the ten most-watched television shows of the year in the UK in 1986, 1989, 1990, 1991, 1992, 1993, 1996, 2001, 2002 and 2003. The 1996 Christmas trilogy of "Heroes and Villains", "Modern Men" and "Time on Our Hands" saw the show's peak. Twenty-one-point-three million viewers watched the first two installments while the third (said to be the show's final episode at the time of broadcast) attracted 24.3 million, a record audience for a British sitcom. Repeat episodes also attract millions of viewers, and the BBC has received criticism for repeating the show too often.

Only Fools and Horses won the BAFTA award for best comedy series in 1985, 1988 and 1996, was nominated in 1983, 1986, 1989, 1990 and 1991, and won the audience award in 2004. David Jason received individual BAFTAs for his portrayal of Del Boy in 1990 and 1996. The series won a National Television Award in 1997 for most popular comedy series; Jason won two individual awards, in 1997 and 2002. At the British Comedy Awards, the show was named best BBC sitcom for 1990, and received the People's Choice award in 1997. It also won the Royal Television Society best comedy award in 1997 and two Television and Radio Industries Club Awards for comedy programme of the year, in 1984 and 1997. John Sullivan received the Writers' Guild of Great Britain comedy award in 1997.

The show regularly features in polls to find the most popular comedy series, moments and characters. It was voted Britain's best sitcom in a 2004 BBC poll, and came 45th in the British Film Institute's list of the 100 Greatest British Television Programmes. It was third on a subsequent viewers' poll on the BFI website. Empire magazine ranked Only Fools and Horses #42 on their list of the 50 greatest television shows of all time. It was also named the funniest British sitcom of all time through a scientific formula, in a study by UKTV Gold. Scenes such as Del Boy's fall through a bar flap in "Yuppy Love" and the Trotters accidentally smashing a priceless chandelier in "A Touch of Glass" are recognisable comedy moments, invariably topping polls of comedy viewers. Del Boy was voted the most popular British TV character of all time in a survey by Open.... and in a 2001 Channel 4 poll he ranked fourth on their list of the 100 Greatest TV Characters. A Onepoll survey found that Only Fools and Horses was the television series Britons would most like to see return.

=== Ratings ===
| Series | Timeslot (UK) | Episodes | First aired | | Last aired | | Avg. viewers (millions) |
| Series | Timeslot (UK) | Episodes | Date | Viewers (millions) | Date | Viewers (millions) | Avg. viewers (millions) |
|---|---|---|---|---|---|---|---|
| 1 | Tuesday 8:30 pm | 6 | 8 September 1981 | 9.2 | 13 October 1981 | 8.8 | 7.7 |
| 2 | Thursday 8:30 pm | 7 | 21 October 1982 | 7.7 | 2 December 1982 | 10.2 | 8.8 |
| 3 | Thursday 8:30 pm | 7 | 10 November 1983 | 9.4 | 22 December 1983 | 11.9 | 10.5 |
| 4 | Thursday 8:00 pm | 7 | 21 February 1985 | 15.2 | 4 April 1985 | 14.2 | 14.9 |
| 5 | Sunday 8:35 pm | 6 | 31 August 1986 | 12.1 | 5 October 1986 | 18.8 | 16.0 |
| 6 | Sunday 7:15 pm | 6 | 8 January 1989 | 13.9 | 12 February 1989 | 18.9 | 16.7 |
| 7 | Sunday 7:15 pm | 6 | 30 December 1990 | 15.0 | 3 February 1991 | 18.9 | 16.8 |

== Cultural impact ==
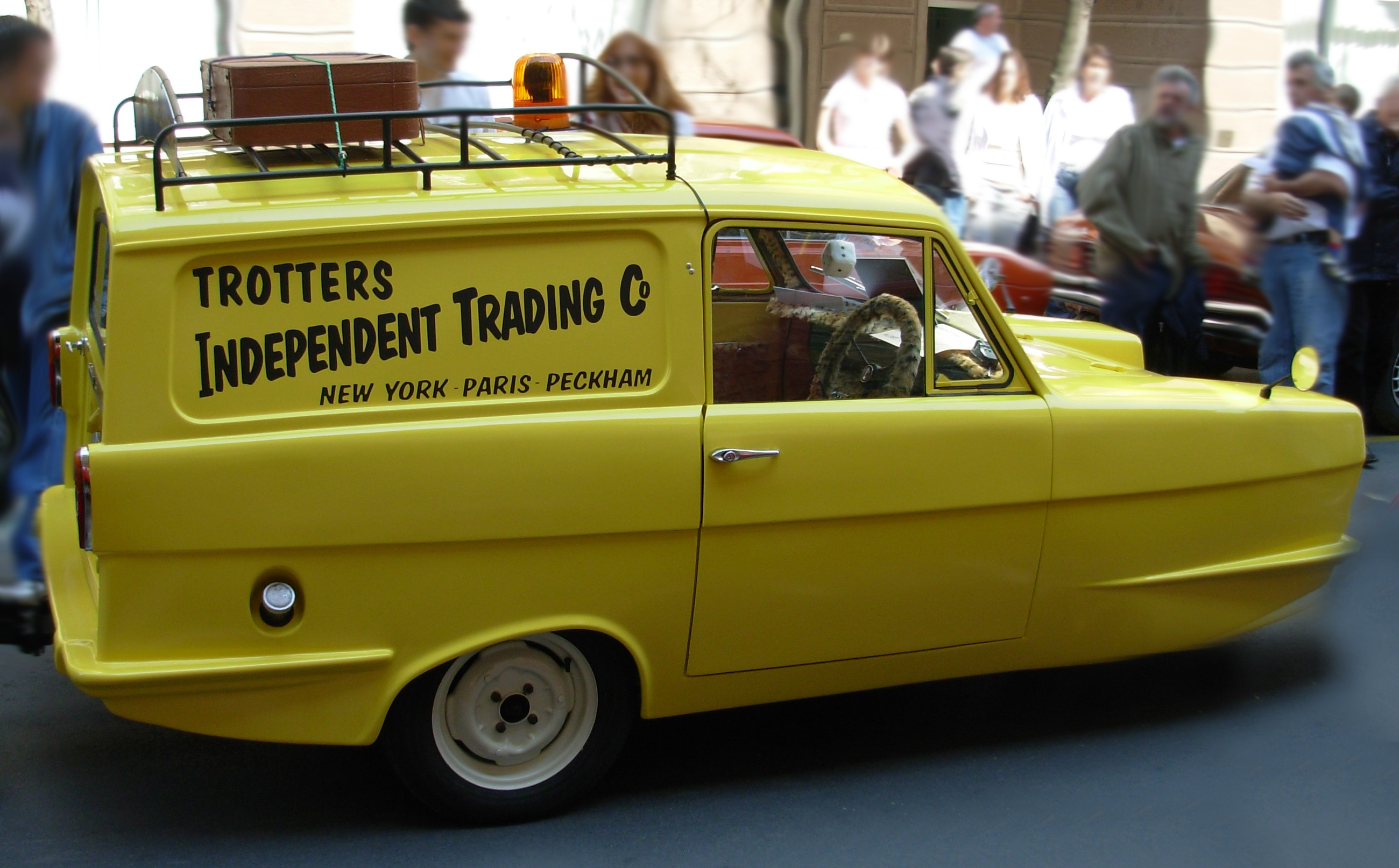
A replica of the Trotters' Reliant Regal

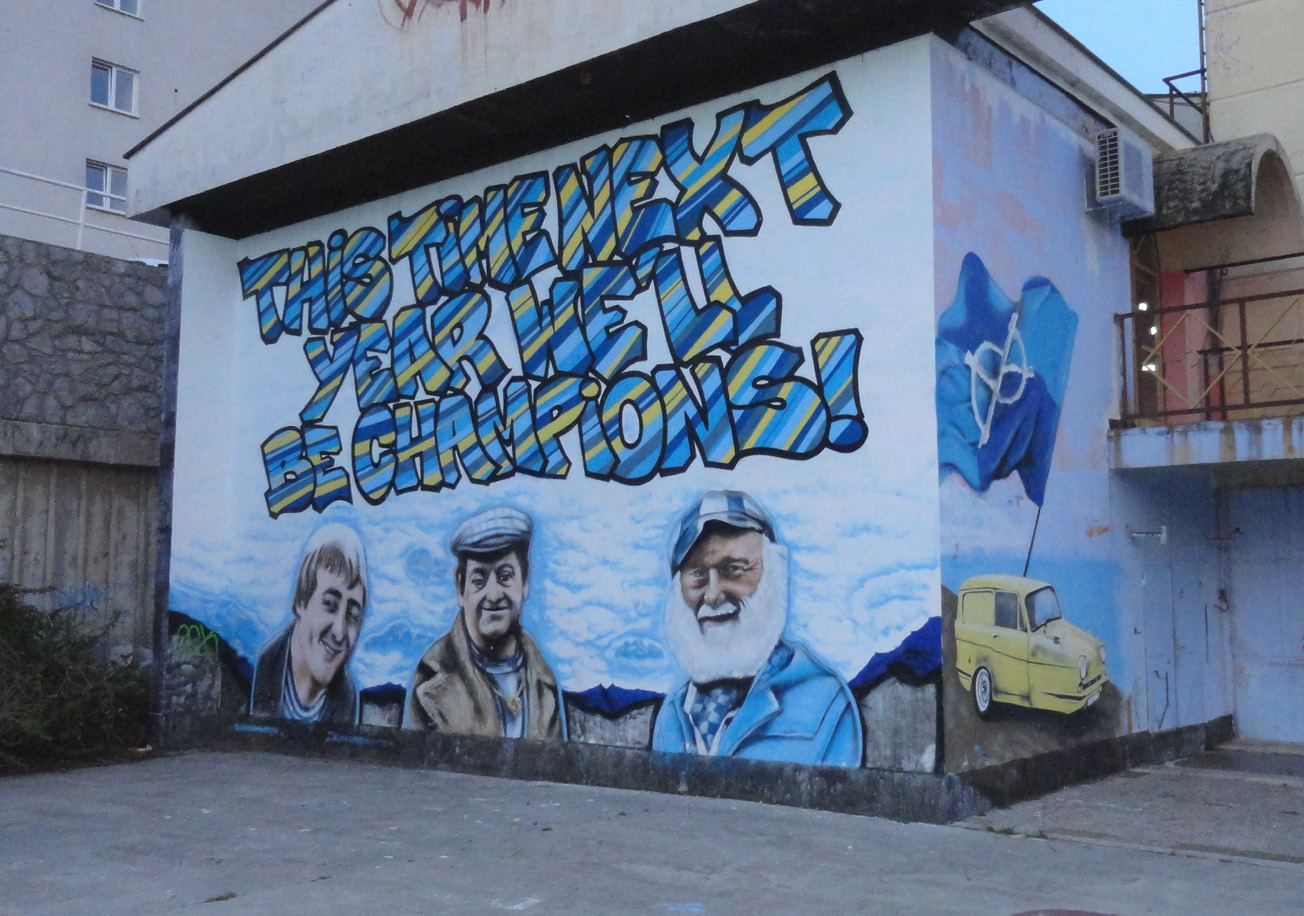
Graffiti in Croatia made by HNK Rijeka supporters paraphrasing Del Boy: "This Time Next Year We'll Be Champions!"

In addition to its mainstream popularity, Only Fools and Horses has developed a cult following. The Only Fools and Horses Appreciation Society, established in 1993, has a membership of around 7,000, published 45 issues of a quarterly newsletter, Hookie Street, and organises annual conventions of fans, often attended by cast members. The Society has also organised an Only Fools and Horses museum, containing props from the series, including Del Boy's camel coat and the Trotters' Ford Capri. It was named one of the top 20 cult television programmes of all time by TV critic Jeff Evans. Evans spoke of:

[shows] such as Only Fools and Horses, which gets tremendous viewing figures but does inspire conventions of fans who meet in pubs called the Nag's Head and wander round dressed as their favourite characters

Only Fools and Horses – and consequently John Sullivan – is credited with the popularisation in Britain of several words and phrases used by Del Boy, particularly "Plonker", meaning a fool or an idiot, and two expressions of delight or approval: "Cushty" (from the Roma word for "good") and "Lovely jubbly". The latter was borrowed from an advertising slogan for a popular 1960s orange juice drink, called "Jubbly", which was packaged in a pyramid-shaped, waxed-paper carton. Sullivan remembered it and thought it was an expression Del Boy would use; in 2003, the phrase was incorporated into the new Oxford English Dictionary.

Owing to its exposure on Only Fools and Horses, the Reliant Regal van is often linked with the show in the British media. The one used by the Trotters has attained cult status and is currently on display at the On Screen Cars exhibition at the National Motor Museum, alongside many other vehicles from British and American television and movies, such as the Batmobile and the DeLorean from Back to the Future. Boxer Ricky Hatton, a fan of the show, purchased one of the original vans in 2004. Another of the vans used in the series was sold at auction in the UK for £44,000 in February 2007.

During the media frenzy surrounding The Independent's revelations that the new bottled water Dasani, marketed by Coca-Cola, was in fact just purified tap water from Sidcup, mocking parallels were made with the Only Fools and Horses episode "Mother Nature's Son", in which Del Boy sells tap water as "Peckham Spring".

Rose Tyler's father, Pete Tyler, is referred to as "a bit of a Del Boy" in the 2005 Doctor Who episode "Father's Day".

In the closing ceremony of the 2012 London Olympics, the Trotters' yellow Reliant van appeared on stage, alongside Del Boy and Rodney body doubles dressed as Batman and Robin, a reference to the Only Fools and Horses episode "Heroes and Villains".

== International remakes ==
Only Fools and Horses was sold to countries throughout the world. Australia, Belgium, Cyprus, Greece, Ireland, Israel, Malta, New Zealand, Pakistan, Portugal, South Africa, Spain and Yugoslavia are among those who purchased it. In all former Yugoslav countries in which Serbian or Croatian is spoken the title was Mućke (or Мућке in Cyrillic script), which can roughly be translated as "shady deals". This translation was also used in Macedonia, where the show was titled Spletki (Сплетки in Cyrillic). In Slovenia, however, the show was titled Samo bedaki in konji, which is a literal Slovenian translation of the original English title. The show has enjoyed particular popularity in Serbia and Croatia where it has achieved cult status. In Hungary, the first three series were on air on Danube TV channel with title: Csak kötözött bolondoknak.

A number of overseas re-makes have also been produced. A Dutch version aired for one series in 1995, Wat schuift 't? ("What's it good for?"). The Trotters were renamed the Aarsmans and it starred Johnny Kraaykamp jnr. as Stef (Del Boy), Sacco Van der Made as Grandad and Kasper van Kooten as Robbie (Rodney), and was shown on RTL 4. A Portuguese re-make, O Fura-Vidas, a local expression for someone who lives outside the law, ran for three series from 1999 to 2001. It was a literal translation of the British version, with all episodes based on the originals. It centred on the Fintas family, who live in Sapadores, a neighbourhood in Lisbon, and starred Miguel Guilherme as Quim (Del Boy), Canto e Castro as Grandad, and Ivo Canelas as Joca (Rodney). In this Portuguese version the Reliant's equivalent was a 1988 Suzuki Super Carry. A Slovenian re-make, called Brat bratu (Brother to Brother), was broadcast from 2008 to 2009. All episodes were based on the original British storylines, and it was made in co-operation with John Sullivan. It featured brothers Brane (Brane Šturbej) and Bine (Jure Drevenšek), who moved from Maribor to Ljubljana. The series also stars Peter Ternovšek as Grandad. It was directed by Branko Đurić. The series was cancelled after thirteen episodes due to poor ratings.

There have been several plans to produce an American version. One was to be a star vehicle for former M*A*S*H actor Harry Morgan, with Grandad rather than Del Boy becoming the lead character. The other, This Time Next Year..., would have seen the Trotters renamed the Flannagans. A draft script was written for the latter, but neither show materialised. In 2010, Steve Carell, star of the American version of The Office, expressed an interest in making an American version of the series, with him to star as Del Boy. In January 2012 US network ABC commissioned a pilot of an Only Fools and Horses remake titled "King of Van Nuys", written by Scrubs writers Steven Cragg and Brian Bradley. It was developed, rejected and then redeveloped, only to be rejected again later in the year. The pilot starred John Leguizamo as Del Boy, Dustin Ybarra as his brother Rodney and Christopher Lloyd as Grandad. The unreleased pilot was released onto YouTube in August 2023.

A parody of American adaptations of British shows called Only Jerks and Horses was written by David Walliams and Matt Lucas and directed by Edgar Wright in 1997.

== See also ==
British sitcom
