= James Greene (Northern Irish actor) =

Northern Irish actor (1931–2021)

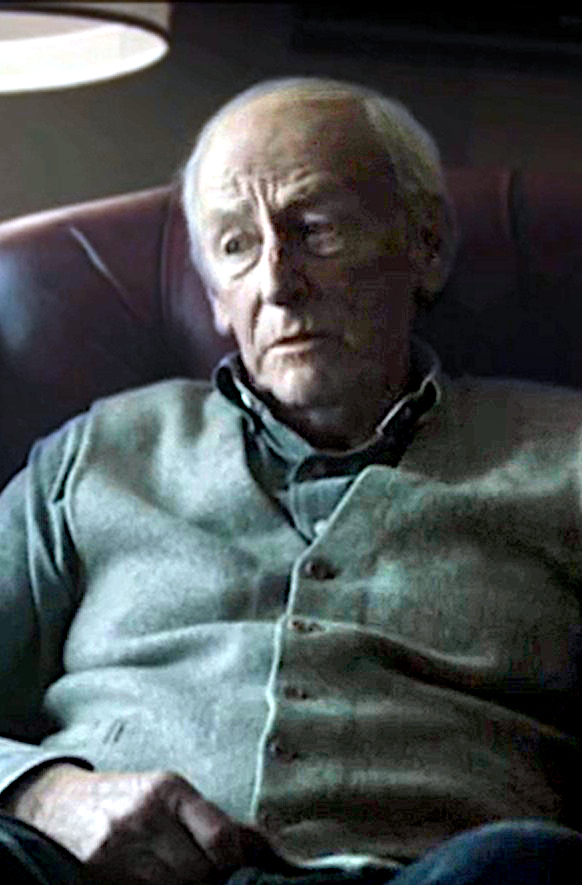
- Greene in Shetland 2013
- Born: 19 May 1931; Belfast, Northern Ireland
- Died: 5 January 2021 (aged 89)
- Occupation: Actor

James Greene (19 May 1931 – 5 January 2021) was a Northern Irish actor who appeared in numerous plays and series on British television over a period of 40 years. He often played lawyers, clergymen, army officers and latterly judges.

Greene was a continuity announcer on Ulster Television from 1959 until 1965. He died in January 2021 after a short illness at the age of 89.

== Filmography ==
- Colditz (1972, TV) as Adjutant
- Thriller (1974, TV) as Policeman/Constable Breck
- Emily (1976, TV)
- Secret Army (TV series) (1978, TV) Episode The Hostage as Brigadier General Markham
- Tales of the Unexpected (1980, TV) as Garage Attendant
- Chocky (1984, TV) as Mr. Trimble
- My Brother Jonathan (1985, TV) as Mr. Wheeler
- Mapp & Lucia (1985-1986, TV) as Reverend Bartlett
- Empire of the Sun (1987) as British Prisoner
- Howards' Way (1988, TV) as Dr. O'Rourke
- The Bill (1990-2008, TV) as Various Roles
- Let Them Eat Cake (1999, TV) as The Comte de Vache
- The Prince and the Pauper (2000) as Archbishop Cranmer
- From Hell (2001) as Masonic Governor
- Band of Brothers (2001, TV) as Old Man on Bicycle
- The Sin Eater (2003) as Percy
- Johnny English (2003) as Scottish Bishop
- The Order (2003) as British Doctor
- What a Girl Wants as Percy
- William and Mary (2003-2005, TV) as Arnold McKinnon
- Doctors (2004-2018, TV) as Peter/Leonard Morden
- Breakfast on Pluto (2005) as Gentleman
- Brothers of the Head (2005) as Brian Aldiss
- Holby City (2005-2013, TV) as Various Roles
- Spooks (2006, TV) as Charlie Holland
- Dracula (2006, TV) as Dr. Blore
- Quest for a Heart (2007) as Narrator (English version, voice)
- RocknRolla (2008) as Judge
- Sherlock Holmes (2009) as Governor
- Midsomer Murders (2010, TV) as Douglas Wakely
- Albert Nobbs (2011) as Patrick
- Borgia (2011, TV) as Maffeo Gherardo
- Dimensions (2011) as Old Man
- Whole Lotta Sole (2011) as Granda Sox
- Merlin (2011, TV) as Ferryman
- Les Misérables (2012) as Ensemble 'Master of the House'
- Shetland (2013, TV) as Andrew Haldane
- Doctor Who (2013, TV) as The Abbott
- The Christmas Candle (2013) as Old Man
- Big School (2013-2014, TV) as Head of Science/Mr. John Hubble
- Birds of a Feather (2014, TV) as Stanley Barrington Court the Third
- Wolf Hall (2015, TV) as Latin-Speaking Priest
- Downton Abbey (2015, TV) as Sir Mark Stiles
- The Crown (2017, TV) as Royal Horological Conservator
