= John Sullivan (writer) =

English television scriptwriter (1946–2011)

John Sullivan OBE
- Sullivan in 2010
- Born: John Richard Thomas Sullivan; 23 December 1946; Balham, South London, England
- Died: 22 April 2011 (aged 64); Surrey, England
- Occupation: Screenwriter
- Spouse: Sharon Usher (m. 1974)
- Children: 3, including Jim
- Writing career
- Period: 1977–2011
- Notable works: 2010–2011 Rock & Chips; 2005–2009 The Green Green Grass; 1996–2003 Roger Roger; 1986–1987 Dear John; 1983–1986 Just Good Friends; 1981–2003 Only Fools and Horses; 1977–1980 Citizen Smith

John Richard Thomas Sullivan (23 December 1946 – 22 April 2011) was an English television scriptwriter responsible for several British sitcoms, including Only Fools and Horses, Citizen Smith and Just Good Friends.

From working-class South London, Sullivan worked in a variety of low-paid jobs for 15 years before getting his first break writing sketches for The Two Ronnies, which led to writing the sitcom Citizen Smith (1977–1980). He became best known for his next sitcom, Only Fools and Horses (1981–2003). His other sitcoms include Dear John, Sitting Pretty, Roger Roger, and The Green Green Grass. In addition, he wrote the comedy drama serial Over Here and the drama series Micawber for ITV, and co-wrote the comedy Heartburn Hotel.

Sullivan's work won him a number of comedy awards, including the BAFTA for best sitcom on three occasions, and he was made an OBE in 2005. His last work was Rock & Chips, a comedy drama prequel to Only Fools and Horses. The final episode of Sullivan's last comedy series aired six days after his death from pneumonia on 22 April 2011.

== Early life and education ==
Sullivan was born at 35 Zennor Road in Balham, South London, on 23 December 1946. His father was John Patrick Sullivan (17 March 1908 – September 1993) and his mother was Hilda Clara May, née Parker (23 December 1907 – December 1992). Sullivan was from a working-class background, and grew up in Balham. His father was an Irish-born plumber, and his mother occasionally worked as a charwoman. It was in Balham where he observed the sort of market trader that would later appear in Only Fools and Horses.

Sullivan failed his eleven-plus and attended Telferscot Secondary Modern School, where he had an inspirational English teacher named Jim Trowers, who sparked an interest in reading the novels of Charles Dickens and discovered his talent for writing stories. Sullivan left the school at Christmas 1961 with no qualifications. He later attended evening classes in German and English, and read Teach Yourself books after leaving school.

== Career ==
Sullivan's first paid employment was as a messenger boy for Reuters. He then worked in the second-hand car trade, in a brewery, as a window cleaner, and as a carpet layer in the House of Commons.

=== BBC ===
Sullivan got his break into television after submitting scripts to the BBC. He admired Steptoe and Son, Till Death Us Do Part, Phil Silvers' US show Bilko, and "anything by Neil Simon". In November 1974, he gained a job in the BBC props department. He was warned not to pester or approach the stars of the corporation. However, Ronnie Barker encouraged him to write for The Two Ronnies, and he also wrote for Dave Allen. He eventually approached television producer Dennis Main Wilson with a script about a young Marxist. This led to a pilot for Comedy Special in 1977 which, following a positive reaction, was commissioned for a full series, Citizen Smith (1977–80). Citizen Smith ran for four series, after which Sullivan was asked to submit another idea. An initial idea for a comedy set in the world of football was rejected, so he proposed an alternative idea for a sitcom centring on a cockney market trader in working-class, modern-day London called Readies.

Through Ray Butt, a BBC producer and director whom Sullivan had met and befriended when they were working on Citizen Smith, a draft script was shown to the corporation's Head of Comedy, John Howard Davies. Davies commissioned Sullivan to write a full series under an alternative title Only Fools and Horses, which had also been the name of a Citizen Smith episode. Sullivan believed the key factor in it being accepted was the success of ITV's new drama Minder, a series with a similar premise and also set in 1980s London.

Much of Sullivan's material for Only Fools and Horses scripts came from his real-life experiences; falling through a raised bar flap, the chandelier falling, his father's poker sessions, his niece working in the police force, and his grandfather falling down holes to claim money. It is possible that the poverty of the Trotter family, and their eventual rise to wealth, is based on Sullivan's own background. He grew up in a poor household and noted in an interview that he and his friends seemingly had no opportunities after leaving school apart from becoming, as Sullivan put it, "factory fodder". The success of Only Fools and Horses made him very rich.

With the success of Only Fools..., at the suggestion of his wife he decided to write a romantic comedy series featuring a strong female lead character. His source of inspiration was a letter in a magazine read to him by his wife, written by a woman who had been jilted by her fiancé on the day of her wedding. Just Good Friends ran for three series and a feature-length special between 1983 and 1986. Other sitcoms included Dear John (1986–1987) and Sitting Pretty (1992–1993). Later in his career, he moved towards writing comedy drama series such as Over Here (1996), Roger Roger (1996–2003), and Micawber (2001). His last work, Rock & Chips (2010–2011), was the second spin-off of Only Fools....

== Awards and honours ==
Only Fools and Horses won the BAFTA award for best comedy series in 1986, 1989 and 1997, as well as the RTS best comedy award in 1997, best sitcom at the 1990 British Comedy Awards, and two Television and Radio Industries Club Awards for comedy programme of the year in 1984 and 1997. Sullivan won the Writers' Guild of Great Britain comedy award for the 1996 Only Fools and Horses (OFAH) Christmas trilogy and another from The Heritage Foundation in 2001.

In the 2005 New Year Honours, Sullivan was appointed an OBE for services to drama. On 2 September 2008, he was awarded an Honorary Fellowship at Goldsmiths, University of London.

On 22 July 2012, a blue plaque was unveiled by David Jason at Teddington Studios in Middlesex, England, to celebrate Sullivan's contribution to British comedy. Nicholas Lyndhurst and John Challis also attended among other cast members.

== Death ==
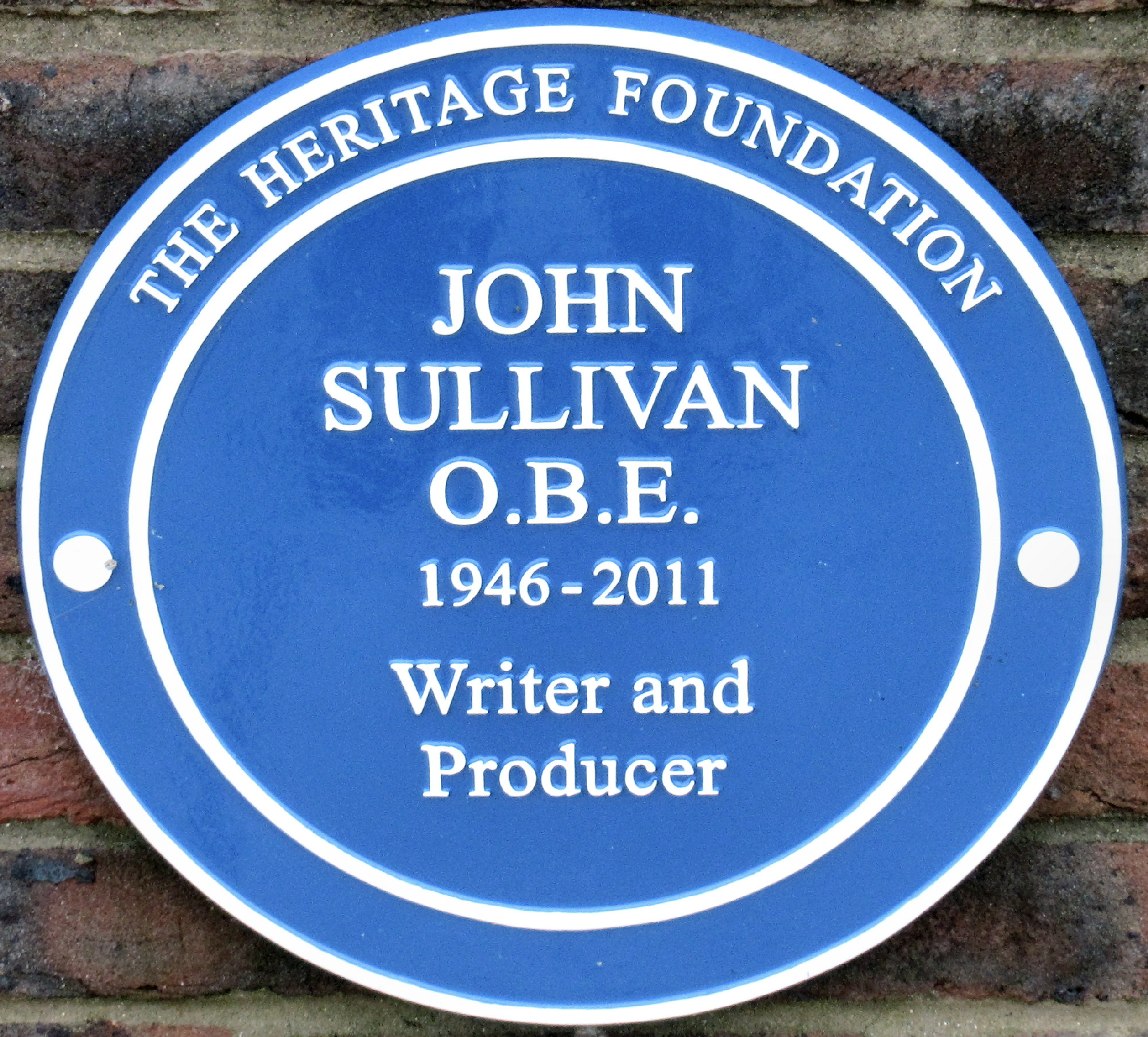
A plaque honoring Sullivan on display at Teddington Studios in Teddington

Sullivan died on 22 April 2011, in a Surrey hospital, after having viral pneumonia for six weeks. He was 64. BBC Director-General Mark Thompson paid tribute, saying: "John had a unique gift for turning everyday life and characters we all know into unforgettable comedy." Six days after his death, the third episode of Rock & Chips aired on BBC One. Due to Sullivan's death, this was to be the final episode.

Gareth Gwenlan, a producer of Only Fools and Horses and a close friend of Sullivan, paid tribute to the writer: "The sudden death of John Sullivan has deprived the world of television comedy of its greatest exponent. John was a writer of immense talent and he leaves behind him an extraordinary body of work which has entertained tens of millions of viewers and will continue to do so for many decades to come." Sullivan was survived by his wife Sharon, whom he married on 23 February 1974, two sons Dan and Jim, a daughter, Amy, and three grandchildren.

== Writing credits ==
Production	Notes	Broadcaster
Citizen Smith	30 episodes (1977–1980)	BBC
The Two Ronnies	13 episodes (sketch contributor, 1977–1982)	BBC
Only Fools and Horses	64 episodes (1981–2003)	BBC
The Funny Side of Christmas	Television film (1982)	BBC
Just Good Friends	22 episodes (1983–1986)	BBC
Dear John	14 episodes (1986–1987)	BBC
Dear John USA	90 episodes (1988–1992)	NBC
Sitting Pretty	13 episodes (1992–1993)	BBC
Over Here	Television film (1996)	BBC
Roger Roger	Television film (1996)	BBC
Roger Roger	16 episodes (1998–1999, 2003)	BBC
Heartburn Hotel	13 episodes (co-written with Steve Glover, 1998–2000)	BBC
Micawber	4 episodes (2001–2002)	ITV
The Green Green Grass	32 episodes (wrote first series only, and select later episodes, 2005–2009)	BBC
Rock & Chips	3 episodes (2010–2011)	BBC

Sullivan wrote the theme tunes for Only Fools and Horses, Just Good Friends, Dear John and The Green Green Grass. Sullivan also performed lead vocals on the theme tunes for Only Fools and Horses and The Green Green Grass.

== Awards and nominations ==
Year	Award	Work	Category	Result	Reference
1989	British Academy Television Awards	Only Fools and Horses	Best Comedy Series (with Gareth Gwenlan and Tony Dow)	Won	
1990	British Academy Television Awards	Only Fools and Horses	Best Comedy Series (with Gareth Gwenlan and Tony Dow)	Nominated	
1991	British Academy Television Awards	Only Fools and Horses	Best Comedy Series (with Gareth Gwenlan and Tony Dow)	Nominated	
1991	ASCAP Film and Television Music Awards	Dear John	Top TV Series	Won	
1991	British Comedy Awards		WGGB Top Comedy Writer	Won	
1992	British Academy Television Awards	Only Fools and Horses	Best Comedy (Programme or Series) (with Gareth Gwenlan and Tony Dow)	Nominated	
1997	British Academy Television Awards	Only Fools and Horses	Best Comedy (Programme or Series) (with Gareth Gwenlan and Tony Dow)	Won	
1997	Writers' Guild of Great Britain Award	Only Fools and Horses	TV – Situation Comedy	Won	
