= Dear John (British TV series) =

- Genre: Situation comedy
- Written by: John Sullivan
- Starring: Ralph Bates; Belinda Lang; Peter Denyer; Peter Blake; Rachel Bell
- Country of origin: United Kingdom
- Original language: English
- No. of series: 2
- No. of episodes: 14

Production
- Running time: 30 minutes

Original release
- Network: BBC1
- Release: 17 February 1986 – 21 December 1987

Related
- Dear John (1988)

Dear John is a British sitcom, written by John Sullivan. Two series and a special were broadcast in 1986 and 1987.

The sitcom's title refers to "Dear John" letters, usually written by women to their partners as a means of ending a relationship. John discovers in the opening episode that his wife is leaving him for a friend. He has to leave his home, while still being expected to pay the mortgage, and finds lodgings. In desperation, he joins the 1-2-1 Singles Club and meets other people who have fared equally unfortunately in their romantic lives. The outside shots of houses were filmed in Melthorne Drive, South Ruislip.

In 1988, an American adaptation of Dear John was produced by Paramount for the NBC network, starring Judd Hirsch. That series lasted for four seasons.

== Characters ==
=== Major characters ===
- John Lacey (Ralph Bates) — a secondary school teacher whose wife leaves him for his best friend, Mike. He has to leave his home, but continue paying the mortgage on it, while living in a bedsit. Although John's wife is manipulative and John can be considered the wronged party, he thinks in retrospect that he may have neglected her emotionally. He feels cut off from his son, to whom he has access only on Sundays. They end up at the zoo because it is the only place open. John's problems come from an inability, or unwillingness, to confront people or from being "too nice" – giving rise to situations that can rebound in unexpected ways.
- Kate (Belinda Lang) — an outwardly frigid woman with three failed marriages. She continually spars with Kirk, whose growing lust for her becomes a running theme. At one point, she shares a bed with John, although it is suggested that nothing more than sleeping happened, as they were both drunk at the time. Eventually, she goes to Greece and finds a boyfriend (much to Kirk's dismay), but makes a surprise reappearance in the show's final episode.
- Ralph Dring (Peter Denyer) — a shy and morose man whose only real friend is a terrapin named Terry and who married a Polish woman called Blomlika. She was a defector who (as Ralph tells it), worked as a welder at the Gdańsk Shipyard, was smuggled out of Poland by her brother by "hiding in the bottom of a Polish Army mobile field kitchen" and deserted Ralph on their wedding day. He develops a friendship with Kirk, even though Kirk holds his boring demeanour in some disdain. He often gives Kirk a lift home on his motorcycle combination due to Kirk's "Porsche" always being unavailable.
- Kirk St Moritz / Eric Morris (Peter Blake) — a crass, tactless chauvinist who claims to drive a Porsche (although he is never seen driving it) and dresses in the style of John Travolta in Saturday Night Fever. He claims to be a spy but is shown at the end of series one to be an alter ego created by Eric Morris who is in his mid-thirties and lives in shabby circumstances with an overbearing mother who calls him "Big Ears". Eric claims to John in private that Kirk represents "all the qualities" he aspires to, and that he has other personae, suggesting Eric has simply become a persona that he presents to his mother, just as Kirk is the persona he presents to the 1-2-1 Club. Kirk explains Eric in public as an undercover version of Kirk with his mother being his (male) operations controller in disguise. In the series' final episode, Eric is returning with Kirk's dry-cleaned outfit when he sees his friends about to be beaten up by a group of Hells Angels. In homage to Superman, he retreats into the pub toilet and (after the Superman theme is played), emerges as Kirk, who swiftly dispatches the gang. Eric has an ongoing fascination with Kate, who (as Kirk) he nicknames "Tiger". Although in his Kirk persona they enjoy a combative relationship with insults and barbs regularly flying between them, he claims to John, and later Kate herself, that under the surface he is "kind of fond of her". In reality, he is smitten with her and tries to get John to organise a date for him. Apart from John, the rest of the group only ever meet the Kirk alter ego.
- Louise (Rachel Bell) — the organiser and facilitator of the group. Something of a "Sloane Ranger" with an upper class accent who often ends sentences with "Yah?" or "You will enjoy it", she divorced her husband because of his fetishistic tendencies and remains obsessed with other people's sex lives.
- Sylvia (Lucinda Curtis) — a nervous woman with an irritating laugh who divorced her husband because of his transvestism. She is held as a figure of fun by Louise who often persuades her to share her experiences in front of the whole group. When Sylvia is moved from her Wednesday night meeting to John's Friday night meeting, she makes an attempt to invite him to her house for a romantic meal. John does not feel the same way and the two never become involved any further than friendship.

=== Minor characters ===
- Mrs Arnott (Jean Challis) — quiet, hat-wearing Mrs Arnott (who has depression) generally sits at the back dressed in dowdy clothing, occasionally chipping in with unexpected comments, such as that her husband used to make her play hoopla with ring doughnuts. Eventually, she leaves the group to look after her daughter's children when her daughter goes to work in Africa for VSO. She is often tactlessly referred to as "the fat lady" by Kirk, even in her presence.
- Toby Lacey (William Bates) — Ralph Bates' real-life son portrays his screen son, Toby.
- Wendy (Wendy Allnutt) — John's sexually manipulative and bossy ex-wife.
- Mike Taylor (Tim Pearce (series 1), Roger Blake (series 2)) — Wendy's rugby-playing partner and one of the causes of John's marriage breakdown. John's ex-best friend, Mike was helped by John when he went through a bad patch in his life. Whenever John mentions Mike, he adopts an ape-like stance and likens him to the Honey Monster.
- Ken (Terence Edmond) — Ken is John's teaching colleague and he and his wife Maggie have a strained marriage. Despite using a variety of contraceptives, he and Maggie have still managed to produce five children, whose upkeep and company he finds a constant burden. In contrast to John's simple desire to have a simple, loving relationship, Ken wants to spread his oats and has nothing but envy for what he imagines is John's new life of sexual freedom. This is due to John "beefing up" the image of the 1-2-1 Club with ridiculous accounts of members such as "the Filipino twins", and his exploits in "the hot tub", in order to make his dull life sound much more exciting. Even though John attempts to convince Ken that the tales are pure fantasy, Ken refuses to accept this and joins the 1-2-1 Club looking for adventure. In order to validate his reasons for joining, he gives a woeful tale to the rest of the group that he and Maggie have been divorced for some time, that they are childless and he had always wanted children. He starts to become romantically involved with Kate, who sees him as a kindred spirit, but the affair is discovered by Maggie after Kirk gives her an anonymous telephone tip off. Ken never discovers the identity of the real informer and blames John. Later in the second series, Ken and Maggie seem to be working on their differences and Ken agrees to have a vasectomy. His envy for John's apparent freedom as a divorcee never entirely dissipates.
- Maggie (Sue Holderness) — Ken's wife, who finds him extremely irritating.
- Mrs Lemenski (Irene Prador) — John's neighbour. She is a Polish woman of advancing years, who frequently encounters John in embarrassing circumstances, such as hitting his head on the wall in frustration. She refers to him as "you loony person" or "fruitcake person". She was widowed in the Second World War.
- Mrs Morris (Sheila Manahan) — Kirk/Eric's overbearing Irish mother.
- Ricky Fortune (Kevin Lloyd) — An ex-rock star who scored a 1969 one-hit-wonder entitled "Not on My Birthday", in Iceland, with his group Ricky Fortune & the Fortunates. Upon his arrival to the 1-2-1 Club, his claims to celebrity are mocked by Kirk but he is instantly recognised by Mrs Arnott who, it transpires, is a lifelong fan.

== Episodes ==
=== Series 1 (1986) ===
No.	Title	Original release date
1	"A Singular Man"	17 February 1986
After his wife leaves him for his best friend, teacher John Lacey finds himself living in a bedsit and isolated from his old friends. He joins a support group for divorcees where he finds a collection of unusual characters.
2	"In The Club"	24 February 1986
The 1-2-1 club discuss depression, and Kate reveals that her previous three marriages failed because she is frigid.
3	"Death"	3 March 1986
When Ralph does not turn up to the 1-2-1 disco and talks of suicide, the others rush to his home to make sure he is okay. Ralph believes he is cursed and that is why things keep going wrong for him.
4	"The Party"	10 March 1986
John finds out his old girlfriend is back in town and tries to invite her to a party. He then sits by the phone desperately waiting for her to call back and tries to find anyone who might be his date.
5	"Toby"	17 March 1986
It is Sunday and John has access to his son. With nothing else to do, they go to the zoo again. When he drops him off at home, his ex-wife is unusually welcoming. The 1-2-1 club attend a party hosted by a woman with an unfortunate ailment.
6	"The Fourteen Year Itch"	24 March 1986
John has been exaggerating the tales of his adventures as a single man to his fellow teacher, Ken. Despite his family at home, Ken joins the 1-2-1 club hoping for some action and gets on well with Kate, putting John in a moral dilemma. Ralph becomes a mobile disc jockey.
7	"Under Cover"	31 March 1986
Kirk asks John to put in a good word for him with Kate, so he takes her out for dinner. But things get carried away and they end up in bed together. John tries to visit Kirk at home but is surprised by what he finds.

=== Series 2 (1987) ===
No.	Title	Original release date
8	"A New Member"	7 September 1987
The 1-2-1 club has a new member who claims to be an old pop star, but no-one recognises him. John and his ex-wife have to pretend to be together to get their son into a Catholic school.
9	"Confidence"	14 September 1987
The group throw a sixties themed party for charity and John asks Rick to perform, hoping it will boost his confidence.
10	"Problems With Toby"	21 September 1987
Sylvia reveals how her marriage broke down after she found out that her husband is a transvestite. John's son is unhappy and he tries to work out how to help but is undermined by Kirk.
11	"Sanctuary"	28 September 1987
John has a hot date with Liz but Ken needs help to patch up his marriage. Kate announces she is leaving for Greece.
12	"Torquay"	5 October 1987
Despite a steamy weekend in Torquay, Liz has a new man competing for her affections and John is unsure of his position. Ken is worrying about his upcoming vasectomy. Kirk laments the loss of Kate.
13	"Once Bitten"	12 October 1987
John is in line for promotion to headmaster and he meets a lovely young woman who seems very interested in him.

=== Christmas Special (1987) ===
No.	Title	Original release date
14	"Kate Returns"	21 December 1987
Realising he will be spending Christmas alone, John attempts to find anyone who will take him in for the day. Kirk has lost faith in his personality and Ralph has a run in with some Hell's Angels.

== Title music ==
As with his other series, the title music was composed by the series' writer, John Sullivan. It was arranged by Ronnie Hazlehurst, who composed the music used in many BBC comedies and light entertainment programmes. Joan Baxter provided the vocals.

== Home releases ==
Dear John appeared on video in 1998, three cassettes with both series and the Christmas special, under Playback Entertainment.

Acorn Media UK released both series of Dear John on DVD in the UK in 2010. The first episode is shorter than the one originally broadcast on BBC1 as contractual edits have been made, namely the removal of Beatles music during and at the end of the episode. The subtitles still show "Day Tripper" being played as John enters the community hall and acknowledges some men dressed in "Fab Four" suits, but the music playing is actually muzak. And, at the end, when John and Kate discuss whether they will return the following week, Beatles music can be heard and silhouettes seen in an upper window of the centre. This scene has been totally removed.
