= Micawber (TV series) =

- Country of origin: United Kingdom
- Original language: English
- No. of series: 1
- No. of episodes: 4

Original release
- Network: ITV
- Release: 26 December 2001 – 13 January 2002

Micawber is a 2001 ITV comedy drama series starring David Jason, made by Yorkshire Television. It was written by John Sullivan, based upon the character of Wilkins Micawber from Charles Dickens' 1850 novel David Copperfield, although the storylines were original.

== Plot ==
Although not explicitly stated the series is probably a prequel, it depicts Micawber where David Copperfield first meets him in London. The first episode the series expands on the back story of Micawber. He had been a qualified lawyer but was struck off when charged with embezzling his father-in-law's company's accounts. Micawber believes he was drunk while doing the accounts and thus wrote them incorrectly through negligence; however, it is later revealed he was drugged by his father-in-law who deliberately altered the numbers on Micawber's accounts to frame him. The rest of the series follows Micawber attempting a series of different careers. These include working for a newspaper and later as butler until the lady of the house seduces him and he is challenged to a duel by her husband. Micawber escapes this by faking his own death. In a subplot, the Micawbers adopt a now orphaned workhouse girl, Alice, despite struggling to support their own family. However, this virtue is rewarded when a dangerous debt collector realises she is his daughter and consequently takes over Micawber's debts.

== Cast ==
- David Jason as Wilkins Micawber
- Annabelle Apsion as Emma Micawber
- Heather Cameron-McLintock as Alice Micawber
- Lucinda Dryzek as Lily Micawber
- Andrew Quigley as Wilkins Micawber Junior
- Michael Troughton as Milton

== Production ==
=== Development ===
Sullivan had originally written an adaptation of Dickens' novel which was rejected by the BBC in favour of the 1999 Adrian Hodges adaptation.

== Broadcast ==
It was broadcast in four parts, the first part on Boxing Day 2001 and starred a number of well-known British actors and actresses.
