= Gareth Gwenlan =

British television producer and director (1937-2016)

Gareth Gwenlan OBE
- Born: 26 April 1937; Brecon, Wales
- Died: 8 May 2016 (aged 79); Herefordshire, England
- Education: Rose Bruford College
- Occupations: Television producer, director
- Years active: 1975–2016
- Known for: The Fall and Rise of Reginald Perrin; Butterflies; To the Manor Born; Only Fools and Horses; The Green Green Grass; Rock & Chips
- Spouses: Valerie Bonner (m. 1962, divorced) Sarah Fanghanel (m. 1986, divorced) Gail Evans (m. 2000)
- Children: 2
- Awards: Officer of the Order of the British Empire (2013)

Gareth Gwenlan (26 April 1937 – 8 May 2016) was a Welsh television producer, director and executive, best known for his work on shows such as The Fall and Rise of Reginald Perrin, Butterflies, To the Manor Born, Only Fools and Horses, and High Hopes. Gwenlan was appointed Officer of the Order of the British Empire (OBE) in the 2013 Birthday Honours for services to broadcasting.

== Early life ==
Gwenlan was born at Tydfil Lodge, Merthyr Tydfil on 26 April 1937, although his birth was registered at Brecon. His father, Charles Aneuryn Gwenlan, and his mother, Mary, née Francis, were both teachers.

Gwenlan attended Vaynor and Penderyn High School, Cefn Coed, and for his national service he joined the RAF in Cyprus. In 1960 he began his acting training at Rose Bruford College of Speech and Drama in Sidcup and continued at the York Theatre Royal.

== Career ==
Gwenlan began his BBC television career as an assistant floor manager and production assistant in the drama department, working on series such as Doctor Who. He subsequently moved into comedy, producing series such as The Fall and Rise of Reginald Perrin, Butterflies and To the Manor Born. In 1983, he was appointed Head of BBC Comedy, a position he held until 1990. He directed the sitcom Double First (1988). In 1988, he directed the pilot episode of First of the Summer Wine and he succeeded Ray Butt as the producer of Only Fools and Horses, remaining with the series until it finished in 2003.

Gwenlan famously rejected the sitcom Red Dwarf (in his capacity as Head of Comedy), stating that the sitcom would work only if there were "a sofa in the spacecraft". This is the reason that the name "Gwenlan" was appropriated in the first series as a future swearword.

== Personal life and death ==
Gwenlan married three times. On 21 April 1962 in York, he married Valerie Bonner, an artist, and they had a child together. On 14 February 1986, he married Sarah Elizabeth Fanghanel, a personal assistant to Gwenlan. He had another child from a separate relationship. His final marriage was to Gail Susan Evans on 9 September 2000 in Putley where they lived until his death from metastatic oesophageal cancer on 8 May 2016.
