= Tony Dow (director) =

British television director

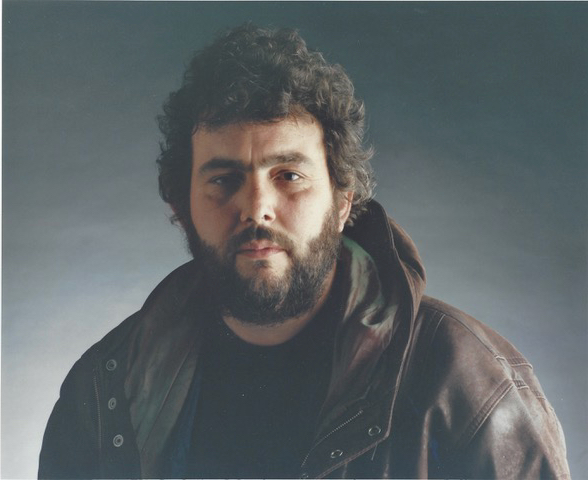
- Tony Dow in 1997
- Occupation: Television director
- Years active: 1981–

Anthony Dow is a British television director best known for his work on Only Fools and Horses. He has won two BAFTAs and been nominated four times.

== Filmography ==
- Only Fools and Horses (1988–2003, 2014)
- Birds of a Feather (1989)
- Nightingales (1990–1993)
- Hunderby (2012–2015)
- Big School (2013)
- Stella (2012–2016)
- Victoria Wood's Mid Life Christmas (2009)
- After You've Gone (2007)

== Awards ==
Dow has won two BAFTAs, both for Only Fools and Horses. He has been nominated four times.
