= The Green Green Grass series 2 =

The Green Green Grass
- Series 2
- DVD cover
- No. of episodes: 8

Release
- Original network: BBC
- Original release: 15 September – 25 December 2006

Series chronology
- ← Previous; Series 1 Next → Series 3

The second series of The Green Green Grass originally aired between 15 September 2006 and 27 October 2006, beginning with the episode "Testing Times". A Christmas special aired on 25 December 2006.

== Outline ==
The series continued to feature the seven main characters that appeared in series one. These were:

Actor	Role
John Challis	Boycie
Sue Holderness	Marlene
Jack Doolan	Tyler
David Ross	Elgin
Ivan Kaye	Bryan
Peter Heppelthwaite	Jed
Ella Kenion	Imelda

Lisa Diveney's character, Beth, who was Tyler's girlfriend, was regular throughout the series, as was Llewellyn (Alan David) and Ray (Nigel Harrison).

== Episodes ==
No.	Title	Directed by	Written by	Running time	Original release date	UK viewers (millions)
Series
8	"Testing Times"	Dewi Humphreys	Jim Sullivan	30 minutes	15 September 2006	5.04
Boycie uses artificial fertilizer to increase the amount of crops he produces a year, but unfortunately for him his mad next door neighbour Llewellyn spots him hiding the artificial fertilizer and calls the European Union who come to inspect Boycie's farm. Boycie panics and believes he will be sent to prison, and then Elgin, Bryan and Jed add to his worries when they give him a sleeping potion that results in an abnormal amount of hair loss. The day of the inspection comes and the farm staff might have just saved the day.
9	"Here's to You, Mrs Boyce"	Dewi Humphreys	John Sullivan	30 minutes	22 September 2006	4.79
Tyler needs another set of help sessions on his school work, so a student-tutor comes to the house to try to help Tyler revise, although it's Marlene the student tutor puts his attention on. When Tyler's tutor makes a pass at Marlene, Boycie enters and mistakes the kiss for an attempt at an epileptic seizure resuscitation, so Boycie – who is running for Mayor – attempts to revive the tutor with mouth to mouth, which leads to a rather more complicated situation. Meanwhile, Tyler tries to impress Beth by joining the school's rugby team.
10	"Bothered and Bewildered"	Dewi Humphreys	Derren Litten and John Sullivan	30 minutes	29 September 2006	4.77
Boycie decides that it's time to sack one of his staff members as they are not doing enough work, therefore Mrs Cakeworthy is for the chop. As soon as Mrs Cakeworthy leaves, strange things start to happen around Winterdown Farm – and Elgin, Bryan and Jed seem to believe that these strange goings-on have something to do with the curse that Mrs Cakeworthy put on Farmer Boyce, as she is apparently a witch. It is later revealed that Marlene has been scaring Boycie – in an attempt to get Mrs Cakeworthy her job back.
11	"Mother Earth"	Dewi Humphreys	Jim Sullivan	30 minutes	6 October 2006	5.01
Marlene tries to set up a massage and beauty parlour in the house, using Boycie as her guinea pig. During his therapy, Marlene manages to semi-paralyse her husband whilst giving him a massage. Meanwhile, Tyler and Beth are getting closer, therefore Beth's visits to the farm are becoming more frequent but the strange goings-on involving Boycie and Marlene are also occurring more frequently as well leaving Beth uncomfortable with visiting the farm. It doesn't help matters when she sees Boycie totally naked in the living room of the house either.
12	"Schoolboy French"	Dewi Humphreys	James Windett and John Sullivan	30 minutes	13 October 2006	4.96
Lawrence, a French exchange student is coming to stay at the farm for a week, and all the ladies of the manor are excited as Lawrence is said to be a good looking young man, but when the student arrives it's a girl and it is now the men of the farm that start to get excited. Especially Tyler and Boycie – who are both seduced by this young beauty. When Marlene sends her packing, Tyler says sorry to Beth, and asks her to marry him and she accepts. That is until she finds out the ring is a fake that Marlene got given in the sixties.
13	"More Questions Than Answers"	Dewi Humphreys	Paul Alexander	30 minutes	20 October 2006	3.90
Llewellyn challenges Boycie to a pub quiz whereby the loser will have to pay the winner a large sum of money, thanks to Elgin's constant bargaining on behalf of Boycie. The Boyces look set for a huge money loss when their team is nothing but Elgin, Bryan and Jed. However, Tyler turns up and answers all the second round questions right and the two teams end up in a tie breaker but Winterdown Farm looks like it is set to have a bright, rich and rewarding future. Meanwhile, Mrs Cakeworthy is hosting seances in Boycie's front room.
14	"Brothers and Sisters"	Dewi Humphreys	Derren Litten	30 minutes	27 October 2006	5.28
When Marlene secretly invites her sister down to come and stay for the week, Boycie is angry and he reminds her that they are on the run from the Driscoll Brothers who want to shoot Boycie in the head. When Marlene's sister arrives, Bryan instantly falls in love but Marlene's sister isn't the only one to be visiting the Boyces, as the Driscoll Brothers have followed her. However, they are prepared to let Boycie live if he lets them hide something on his open fields. So they leave, to see Earl digging up the 'thing' which they have just buried.
Special
15	"From Here to Paternity"	Tony Dow	John Sullivan	45 minutes	25 December 2006	3.62
When Llewellyn arrives accusing the Boyce's dog, Earl, of seducing his pedigree collie, Blodwyn, who is now pregnant, trouble starts to brew in the village. Boycie doesn't want his reputation to be scarred by having a sexually orientated pet. Things get a whole lot worse, when Mrs Cakeworthy overhears the Boyces talking about it and she assumes they're talking about Tyler getting Beth pregnant. Then when Tyler overhears something being said he thinks that Mrs Cakeworthy is pregnant. Spiralling out of control, the rumours get more and more wild. Meanwhile, Mrs Cakeworthy is named Tai Chi Student of the Month, Tyler has a real Christmas surprise for Beth – a horse! Meanwhile Jed, Elgin and Bryan are convinced that the strange, terrible creature Old Bones has come back to stalk the land, consuming everything in its path.

== Production ==
The series was produced by Shazam Production, a company that produces comedies by John Sullivan. The series was filmed at Teddington Studios, with a live audience. All episodes in the first series were directed by Dewi Humphreys. This particular series was written by Jim Sullivan, John Sullivan, Derren Litten, James Windett and Paul Alexander.

== Reception ==
=== Viewers ===
The series began airing on Friday evenings, at 8:30. The series continued to be hit with viewers, with the first episode, "Testing Times", gaining 5.04 million viewers, which was in the top thirty highest ratings for the week ending 17 September 2006. Ratings then fell for the next two episodes before rising for the fourth dropping again for the next two and ending on a series high. The ratings were high enough for a new series, of seven episodes, to be commissioned. A 2006 Christmas special was also commissioned to air later that year.

=== Critics ===
The comedy continued to be criticised due to its spin-off roots. As a spin-off of the nation's favourite sitcom, The Green Green Grass was always going to have a difficult start. The series continued receive negative reviews from critics and some fans of Only Fools and Horses as well.
