= The Green Green Grass series 3 =

The Green Green Grass
- Series 3
- DVD cover
- No. of episodes: 8

Release
- Original network: BBC
- Original release: 2 November – 30 December 2007

Series chronology
- ← Previous; Series 2 Next → Series 4

The third series of The Green Green Grass originally aired between 2 November 2007 and 21 December 2007, beginning with the episode "But Is it Art?". A Christmas special aired on 30 December 2007.

== Outline ==
The series continued to feature the seven main characters that appeared in series one. These were:

| Actor | Role |
|---|---|
| John Challis | Boycie |
| Sue Holderness | Marlene |
| Jack Doolan | Tyler |
| David Ross | Elgin |
| Ivan Kaye | Bryan |
| Peter Heppelthwaite | Jed |
| Ella Kenion | Imelda |

Lisa Diveney's character, Beth, who was Tyler's girlfriend, was regular throughout the series before leaving the series after the special. Ray (Nigel Harrison) was also a regular throughout the series. Llewellyn (Alan David) only made one appearance in the series, and subsequently appeared in the following Christmas Special.

== Episodes ==
| No. | Title | Directed by | Written by | Running time | Original release date | UK viewers (millions) |
|---|---|---|---|---|---|---|
Series
| 16 | "But Is It Art?" | Dewi Humphreys | Jim Sullivan | 30 minutes | 2 November 2007 | 5.34 |
Boycie and Marlene take a trip to a local country mansion, where Boycie admires the portraits that adorn the walls. Later, he recounts his admiration of this long established tradition of respect for the gentry. Meanwhile, thrown out by his wife, Elgin has moved into Bryan's caravan, which later burns down, and Boycie is horrified to find that Marlene has offered them a place to stay. A month later, it looks like they're never going to go, but they have a surprise – they've commissioned a local cow-painting artist to paint his portrait.
| 17 | "The Lonely Herdsman" | Dewi Humphreys | Jim Sullivan | 30 minutes | 9 November 2007 | 4.62 |
When Marlene drags Boycie and Tyler to visit her mother Dora, the battle lines are drawn. Spending the day away from the farm gives the staff freedom – well, more than they do usually, so they use this to their advantage. However, Bryan is trying his hand at poetry to stop him feeling lonely, as it is the fourth anniversary of his engagement to Myrtle. Meanwhile, Mrs Cakeworthy is surfing the net to help him find a girlfriend but unfortunately finds him one called Steamy Stella. Meanwhile, Dora is cooking up a plan to get rid of Boycie.
| 18 | "If You Go Down to the Woods" | Dewi Humphreys | Jim Sullivan | 30 minutes | 23 November 2007 | 5.20 |
Marlene is distraught when Earl goes missing so Boycie offers a reward for his return. Tyler, thinking of the money, sets off to find Earl but soon gets distracted by Beth. Meanwhile, Boycie forms a search party consisting of himself, Bryan and Jed in an attempt to find Earl and save him some money. Elgin and Mrs Cakeworthy attempt to comfort a hysterical Marlene but Mrs Cakeworthy's traditional biscuit mountain doesn't make a big impression. However, a returning Tyler and Earl bring a smile to her face but where is Boycie?
| 19 | "Sweet Sorrow" | Dewi Humphreys | John Sullivan and Keith Lindsay | 30 minutes | 30 November 2007 | 6.05 |
Boycie and Marlene are flushed with pride as they dream of their son's golden future, but when Tyler's A-Level results let him down, it is the staff who provide the key to getting him motivated. However, after Marlene's visions of Oxford and Cambridge battling it out over Tyler, Boycie decides that he'd better call in some favours and get his son into a university. Meanwhile, Beth has university offers flooding in and a slightly jealous Tyler begins his first taste of ambition. Has the small fortune that Boycie has paid out in private education been a waste?
| 20 | "Fifteen Minutes" | Dewi Humphreys | David Cantor | 30 minutes | 7 December 2007 | 5.08 |
On the way home from a shopping trip, Boycie and Marlene notice a marquee pitched on the village green. Upon a closer inspection they see that it is for a new reality television series called 'Farm Idol'. Boycie's disgust at such as show turns to amusement as he notices Elgin, Bryan and Jed emerging from the marquee. As the show precedes it is revealed that the challenges go from silly to ridiculous but that won't put the boys off. But are they sure that they can handle speed milking, synchronised ploughing and blindfolded sheep shearing?
| 21 | "The Final Curtain" | Dewi Humphreys | John Sullivan | 30 minutes | 14 December 2007 | 5.46 |
Bryan's turkey, Paxo, is on his last legs, so the others rally round and organise a memorial service for the turkey. Meanwhile, Marlene is hoping for a holiday however Boycie refuses claiming that he doesn't have enough money and Tyler has been suspended from university after his scandalous partying antics. However, he is still required to study so therefore the drawing room table is cluttered with John Lennon revision. Also, Boycie takes a look at the website but finds out some information that he'd rather have remained ignorant to.
| 22 | "Lust in Translation" | Dewi Humphreys | David Cantor | 30 minutes | 21 December 2007 | 4.32 |
When Bryan arranges to meet his on-line lover, the staff's loyalties are severely tested, especially after the events that follow. Meanwhile, Llewellyn seizes the opportunity of securing extra labour when Bryan's lustful date arrives with a rather large unexpected family in tow.
Special
| 23 | "The Special Relationship" | Dewi Humphreys | John Sullivan and Keith Lindsay | 40 minutes | 30 December 2007 | 5.40 |
Whilst out in the fields, Boycie and Marlene are horrified when Earl digs up an unexploded hand grenade. However, Boycie takes charge of the situation by diving behind the nearest tractor. But this is just the beginning. It is soon discovered that The Grange was once used as a US Army base in the 1970s. After some more World War Two relics are found, Boycie decides to transform one of his barns into a military museum. Word of Boyce's heroic involvement in the hand grenade incident attracts much media attention, even from the Peckham Times. Meanwhile, Cliff Cooper (George Wendt) arrives in Oakham intent on visiting the old haunts of his military posting. It turns out that he was billeted at The Grange so Boycie and Marlene are quick to invite him to their home as a guest. Boycie is especially pleased when he discovers than Cliff is a president and CEO of a large corporation in LA. An evening in the pub that evening brings up a conversation about the 'Cloud Day' incident and the fact that Cliff was a bit of a ladies' man but rumour has it he left behind a child.

== Production ==
The series was produced by Shazam Production, a company that produces comedies by John Sullivan. The series was filmed at Teddington Studios, with a live audience. All episodes in the first series were directed by Dewi Humphreys. This particular series was written by Jim Sullivan, John Sullivan, Keith Lindsay and David Cantor.

== Reception ==
=== Viewers ===
The series began airing on Friday evenings, at 8:30. The series continued to be hit with viewers, with the first episode, "But is it Art?", gaining 5.34 million viewers, which was in the top thirty highest ratings for the week ending 4 November 2007. Ratings then fell for the next two episodes before rising for the fifth, then dropping again for the next episode, rising again for the sixth and ending on a series low. The ratings were high enough for a last series of nine episodes, which was commissioned and aired.

=== Critics ===
The series, as a spin-off of the nation's favourite sitcom, was always going to have a difficult start. The series continued to receive negative reviews from critics and some fans of Only Fools and Horses as well, but a few positive reviews began to emerge.
