= The Green Green Grass series 4 =

The Green Green Grass
- Series 4
- No. of episodes: 9

Release
- Original network: BBC
- Original release: 8 January – 9 March 2009

Series chronology
- ← Previous; Series 3

The fourth and final series of The Green Green Grass originally aired between 8 January 2009 and 5 March 2009, beginning with the episode "The Path of True Love".

== Outline ==
The series continued to feature the seven main characters that appeared in series one.

| Actor | Role |
|---|---|
| John Challis | Boycie |
| Sue Holderness | Marlene |
| Jack Doolan | Tyler |
| David Ross | Elgin |
| Ivan Kaye | Bryan |
| Peter Heppelthwaite | Jed |
| Ella Kenion | Imelda |

Samantha Sutherland's character, Sara, who was Tyler's girlfriend, was a regular throughout the series before as was Llewellyn (Alan David) and Ray (Nigel Harrison).

== Episodes ==
| No. | Title | Directed by | Written by | Running time | Original release date | UK viewers (millions) |
|---|---|---|---|---|---|---|
Series
| 24 | "The Path of True Love" | Dewi Humphreys | Jim Sullivan | 30 minutes | 8 January 2009 | 4.07 |
The staff easily notice that all is not well at Winterdown Farm. Boycie's lack of attention giving is upsetting Marlene so much that she feels unloved, under-valued and extremely lonely. With worries floating through her head that their marriage may be coming to a close she seeks the help of the local marriage guidance counsellor. When Boycie finds out that their private problems are being spread about the village by no other than his own wife! However, he soon finds out not to confront her as her depression transforms into fury and she throws him out.
| 25 | "Home Brew" | Dewi Humphreys | John Sullivan | 30 minutes | 15 January 2009 | 4.02 |
Whilst searching through the loft, Boycie finds some ancient scrolls and paperwork left behind by the old squire. He also finds a medieval recipe for a traditional local liquor called 'Ye Potato Cyder'. The recipe is accompanied by a royal charter allowing Boycie to make and sell the liquor. With the help of his staff he goes into full-scale business building a distillery in his barn and buying up all the potatoes in the locality. Unfortunately his success attracts two people he thought he'd never see again.
| 26 | "Calendar Boys" | Dewi Humphreys | David Cantor | 30 minutes | 22 January 2009 | 3.86 |
Marlene is bored with life on the farm, so she throws herself into charity work. As a result of her efforts, Boycie stumbles upon an opportunity to become Sir Aubrey. Marlene, with the help of the farm staff, tries to use her charity contacts to help her husband achieve his dream but unfortunately, life is never that simple, particularly where the Boyces are involved. Marlene's calendar, upon release, comes close to sparking many complaints has both Tyler and Boycie have been included involuntarily.
| 27 | "Animal Instincts" | Dewi Humphreys | Jim Sullivan | 30 minutes | 29 January 2009 | 3.87 |
Oakam village is under attack from animal rights activists. Llewellyn is one of their first targets when he is hit with a paint bomb, the village butcher is fly-postered with leaflets and even the local pub is under threat. All the local farming community is living in fear, so Boycie organises his staff into patrol groups to search Winderdown farm and protect it from attack but whose side is Tyler on? Meanwhile, Tyler plans a charity gig that just happens to be a raging success plus he's even got Status Quo to make an appearance.
| 28 | "Your Cheating Art" | Dewi Humphreys | John Sullivan | 30 minutes | 5 February 2009 | 3.93 |
Marlene is worried about Tyler, who is in a deep depression and on what appears to be a starvation diet. Mrs Cakeworthy, meanwhile, discovers the reason why Tyler is withdrawn and spending every hour painting gloomy pictures. She has 'found' a letter from his girlfriend, Beth, in which she says she wants to finish with him. Marlene is distraught and even tries enlisting help from Jed and Bryan to help her little boy come to terms with a broken heart. Maybe Dora can help?
| 29 | "The Departed" | Dewi Humphreys | Keith Lindsay | 30 minutes | 12 February 2009 | 3.73 |
Tyler is preparing for his first gig with his band, Puddle Of Agony. He has booked a venue at the university and Boycie and Marlene are driving him down with all the kit in the boot. Left alone to look after The Grange, the staff head down to the pub where they get talking to Natasha and Ian, two psychic detectives who are in the area seeking phantoms and ghouls. They work for Paranormal Monthly magazine and are offering £5,000 for the photo of a ghost. Eyes set on the dosh, Elgin offers them the run of a haunted thirty-room manor house.
| 30 | "I Done It My Way" | Dewi Humphreys | John Sullivan | 30 minutes | 19 February 2009 | 3.46 |
With a microphone and a tape recorder, Boycie recalls the big issues in his life in what he intends to be a classic – a life manual and an important book for future generations. Boycie's story begins as he recalls his Peckham days, with flashback memories to his South London life with Del Boy, Rodney and the rest of the gang. He fondly remembers his friendships, their adventures, the subsequent move to Shropshire and his new life on the farm. His memories of the old days proves surprisingly enlightening for him and hilarious for Marlene.
| 31 | "One Man's Junk" | Dewi Humphreys | Robert Evans | 30 minutes | 26 February 2009 | 3.70 |
The Antiques Roadshow arrives in Oakham, so Marlene attempts to find something to take down to have valued. Boycie can see the truth though, he knows that she only wants to go down there to get on telly. The farms staff also want to get on telly, but their attempts are slightly more extraordinary. Meanwhile, Tyler and his girlfriend make progress and the rest of Oakham attempt to find something to take down and have valued. Guest starring Fiona Bruce.
| 32 | "For Richer For Poorer" | Dewi Humphreys | Gary Lawson and John Phelps | 30 minutes | 5 March 2009 | 4.38 |
Boycie and Marlene have been married for nearly forty years so Marlene is planning a huge party to celebrate their Ruby wedding anniversary. A marquee and caterers have been booked, the flowers are being organised and a band has been booked to play their song – "What's New Pussy Cat". Meanwhile, the guest list has grown to an enormous length and Marlene has contacted their old Peckham solicitor but he has some bad news, something that might just affect her relationship with Boycie.

== Production ==
The series was produced by Shazam Production, a company that produces comedies by John Sullivan. The series was filmed at Teddington Studios, with a live audience. All episodes in the first series were directed by Dewi Humphreys. This particular series was written by Jim Sullivan, John Sullivan, Keith Lindsay, David Cantor, Robert Evans, Gary Lawson and John Phelps.

== Reception ==
=== Viewers ===
The series began airing on Thursday evenings, at 8:30. The series slumped slightly with viewers, with the first episode, "The Path of True Love", gaining 4.07 million viewers, which was not in the top thirty highest ratings. Ratings then fell for the rest of the series.

| Rank | Episode | Viewership | Audience share |
|---|---|---|---|
| 1 | "For Richer For Poorer" | 4.38 million | 18.8% |
| 2 | "The Path of True Love" | 4.07 million | 16.5% |
| 3 | "Home Brew" | 4.02 million | 16.9% |
| 4 | "Your Cheating Art" | 3.93 million | 15.4% |
| 5 | "Animal Instincts" | 3.87 million | 16.2% |
| 6 | "Calendar Boys" | 3.86 million | 15.8% |
| 7 | "The Departed" | 3.73 million | 15.1% |
| 8 | "One Man's Junk" | 3.70 million | 15.0% |
| 9 | "I Done It My Way" | 3.46 million | 14.4% |
