= The Green Green Grass series 1 =

The Green Green Grass
- Series 1
- DVD cover
- No. of episodes: 7

Release
- Original network: BBC
- Original release: 9 September – 25 December 2005

Series chronology
- Next → Series 2

The first series of The Green Green Grass originally aired between 9 September 2005 and 14 October 2005, beginning with the episode "Keep On Running". A Christmas special aired on 25 December 2005.

== Outline ==
The series introduced the seven main characters that would appear in further series. These were:

Actor	Role
John Challis	Boycie
Sue Holderness	Marlene
Jack Doolan	Tyler
David Ross	Elgin
Ivan Kaye	Bryan
Peter Heppelthwaite	Jed
Ella Kenion	Imelda

Lisa Diveney's character, Beth, who was Tyler's girlfriend, became a regular from the episode "Pillow Talk".

== Episodes ==
No.	Title	Directed by	Written by	Running time	Original release date	UK viewers (millions)
Series
1	"Keep On Running"	Tony Dow	John Sullivan	30 minutes	9 September 2005	8.88
Boycie receives word from an old friend that the Driscoll brothers have found it was him that got them put in prison. So Boycie sells his business and the house whilst his wife is at a health spa and his son is in France. He then confronts them upon their arrival home by simply stating that they are moving. He initially tries to hide the reason for their sudden departure from Peckham, but Marlene gets it out of him by threatening to strip naked. The family arrive at their new home to find the locals worrying and the history of the farm disturbing.
2	"A Rocky Start"	Tony Dow	John Sullivan	30 minutes	16 September 2005	6.34
Boycie decides he needs to show the people of Oakham that he is not just an ordinary farmer, but a Gentleman farmer. To prove his point, he buys a prize-winning bull called Rocky. However, Boycie and his staff later find out that the bull has problems. Boycie discovers that Rocky is a gay bull and he won prizes via artificial insemination, something which the seller failed to mention to Boycie. Meanwhile, Tyler can't seem to find a place to ride his skateboard as there is nothing but grass everywhere; even the hills are covered.
3	"The Country Wife"	Tony Dow	John Sullivan	30 minutes	23 September 2005	5.86
Marlene tries her hand at country cooking, despite the warnings from her husband and her son. She demands Boycie goes and picks some berries of the many bushes in their fields even though he is reluctant to do so Boycie takes the basket and leaves. Whilst Boycie is picking berries he meets their next door neighbor – the mad Welsh man, Llewellyn who holds a shotgun to his head whilst giving a lecture about Wales. Llewellyn latter holds Rocky for ransom when he wanders onto his land. Boycie then seeks legal advice and is told that he has to pay the mad Welsh man.
4	"Hay Fever"	Tony Dow	John Sullivan	30 minutes	30 September 2005	6.33
As Boycie and Marlene are only just dealing with the fact they have a gay bull and a miserable next door neighbour, they can't be doing with Tyler around the house all day and all night either, so they think it's time he started at his new school to Tyler's dismay. Meanwhile, Elgin orders a herd of cows as Farmer Boyce instructed, but Marlene insists they buy only six cows and she is extremely annoyed when she arrives home to find a herd of three hundred cows on the farm. Either Boycie's gone behind her back or he can't count.
5	"Pillow Talk"	Tony Dow	John Sullivan	30 minutes	7 October 2005	6.63
Marlene is having sleeping problems due to the unbearable quiet that comes with farm life. Not even the bloody Owl outside is helping her sleeping pattern, but one thing might – and only Boycie can provide that. That is until Boycie decides that Jed could do something different to help her but will she appreciate it? Meanwhile, Jed looks forward to his trip to London to attend the farmers' convention with his free ticket and Tyler attends his first day at his new school, however he takes more interest in his teacher than perhaps he should.
6	"Sex and the Country"	Tony Dow	John Sullivan	30 minutes	14 October 2005	6.40
Tyler approaches his English teacher and asks for a date but she declines, however this doesn't stop Tyler buying her a box of make up. In the end, Tyler gives in to Marlene's nagging and reveals that he has feelings for his teacher. So Boycie goes to see her and she makes it clear that she is not interested in Tyler, she only likes older men – but as things start to heat up, Llewellyn stumbles in. Meanwhile, Elgin, Bryan, Jed and Mrs Cakeworthy concoct a potion for the bull, to make him attracted to the cows however Boycie drinks it.
Special
7	"One Flew Over the Cuckoo Clock"	Tony Dow	John Sullivan	50 minutes	25 December 2005	4.59
Boycie is invited to a country club ball for Christmas, along with royalty and other high up persons. Boycie meets two men who run a polo club, and tell Boycie that for a few million he could be a joint partner and within a year he would be knighted as 'Sir Aubrey'. So they agree to spend Christmas together in Switzerland, but on Christmas Eve Boycie and Marlene can't make it to the airport as they are snowed in. So, they are forced to spend Christmas with Mrs Cakeworthy, Bryan, Jed and Llewellyn – as he is filling in for Elgin as farm manager because Elgin has gone into hospital. The TV shows a crime show revealing that the two men that were inviting Boycie to join their polo club were con men and the Driscoll brothers had followed them to Switzerland looking for Boycie because they saw his picture in a country magazine which mentioned where they would be that Christmas. So, Boycie insists that God looked after him and made it snow on purpose. So the Boyces are safe and sound, for now, and continue to celebrate Christmas Driscoll-brothers free...

== Production ==
The series was produced by Shazam Production, a company that produces comedies by John Sullivan. The series was filmed at Teddington Studios, with a live audience. All episodes in the first series were directed by Tony Dow, director of Only Fools and Horses.

== Reception ==
=== Viewers ===
The series began airing on Friday evenings, at 8:30. The series was an immediate hit with viewers, with the first episode, "Keep On Running", gaining 9.13 million viewers, which was in the top five of the highest rating for the week ending 11 September 2005. Ratings then fell for the next two episodes before steadily rising again. The second half of the series performed much better than most other sitcoms, with episode four going back up above 6 million viewers. The following two episodes remained at the six million mark. The ratings were high enough for a new series, of seven episodes, to be commissioned. A 2005 Christmas special was also commissioned.

=== Critics ===
The comedy has been criticised due to its spin-off roots. As a spin-off of the nation's favourite sitcom, The Green Green Grass was always going to have a difficult start. The series received negative reviews from critics and some fans of Only Fools and Horses alike. The series has continued to run due to the bigger than usual audiences it attracts and the general thoughts towards it.
