= A Rocky Start =

A Rocky Start may refer to:

- "A Rocky Start" (The Green Green Grass), a 2005 television episode
- "A Rocky Start" (Ninjago), a 2019 television episode
