= Roy Heather =

English actor (1935–2014)

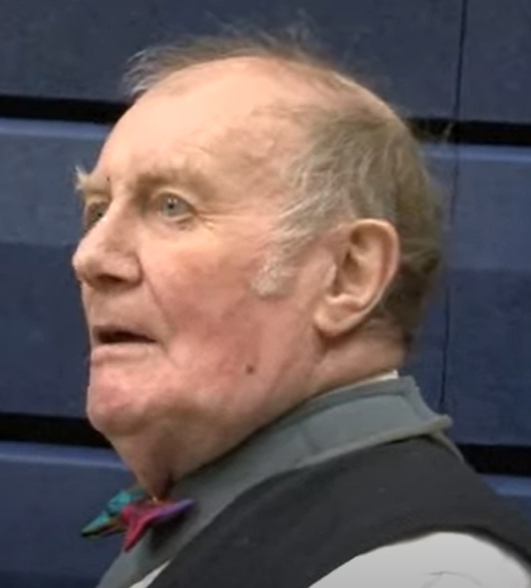
- Heather in 2011
- Born: 20 May 1935; Stoke Poges, Buckinghamshire, England
- Died: 3 September 2014 (aged 79); Purbrook, Hampshire, England
- Occupation: Actor
- Years active: 1981–2010
- Known for: Only Fools and Horses
- Spouses: Doreen (divorced); Sarah Vernon (m. 1982–1987) Sara Taylor (m. 1993)
- Children: 3

Roy Heather (20 May 1935 – 3 September 2014) was an English television actor best remembered for playing café owner Sid in the sitcom Only Fools and Horses.

Heather was born in Stoke Poges, Buckinghamshire. After leaving school, he worked for an asbestos firm before National Service with the Royal Air Force. He then did several jobs, including working as a Betterware household goods salesman, while continuing his interest in amateur acting. He was spotted by David Tudor, who gave him his first professional job in repertory theatre at the age of 44. While working for Tudor, he played many leading roles including Frank in Winter Journey and Reg in The Norman Conquests, and co-starred in the world premiere of Aurelia, with Ingrid Pitt. He debuted the role of Pistol in Peter Mottley's stage monologue, After Agincourt.

Heather appeared in various British television shows, usually in small roles, including Edge of Darkness, Poirot, The Legacy of Reginald Perrin, Birds of a Feather, Hi-de-Hi!, Bottom, The Green Green Grass, The Bill and an episode of series 10 of BBC sitcom My Family. He regularly appeared as the nameless old man in the Sky One sitcom Time Gentlemen Please written by Al Murray and Richard Herring. He also attended fan conventions for Only Fools and Horses.

== Death ==
Heather died in Purbrook, Hampshire from undisclosed causes on 3 September 2014. He was 79 years old.

== Filmography ==
=== Film ===
Year	Title	Role	Notes
1982	Experience Preferred... But Not Essential	Wally	
1986	Car Trouble	Ambulanceman 1	

=== Television ===
Year	Title	Role	Notes
1981	It Ain't Half Hot Mum	The Corporal	Episode: "Aquastars"
1981	Scene	Tom	Episode: "Patty Fatty"
1982	Seconds Out	Chauffeur	Episode: "Round 12"
1982–1983	Hi-de-Hi!	Inspector Palmer Second Man	2 episodes
1982–1996, 2001–2003	Only Fools and Horses	Sid	13 episodes
1982	The Funny Side of Christmas: Christmas Trees	Sid	TV short
1983	The Crystal Cube	Gareths Father, Mr. 0001	Television film
1983	The Nation's Health	Unknown	Episode: "Collapse"
1983	Reilly: Ace of Spies	Karl	Episode: "The Trust"
1983	Johnny Jarvis	Car Showroom Manager	Episode: "Part Two: 1978-1979"
1983	A Fine Romance	Taxi Driver	Episode: "The Dinner Party"
1984	Mitch	Houseman	Episode: "Business as Usual"
1984	Just Good Friends	Tom	Episode: "Guilt"
1984	Big Deal	Harry	Episode: "A Ragged Run"
1984	The Clairvoyant	Man	Episode: "Pilot"
1985	Me and My Girl	Taxi Driver	Episode: "On Approval"
1985–2003	The Bill	Various	7 episodes
1985	Edge of Darkness	Lowe	Episode: "Burden of Proof"
1985	Terry and June	Deliveryman	Episode: "Pantomania"
1986	Comrade Dad	Commissar	Episode: "Dangerous Connections"
1986	Return to Treasure Island	Simpson	Episode: "Mutiny"
1986	Breaking Up	Wiggins	Episode: #1.1
1987	Indelible Evidence	Doug Scott	Episode: "Gaslight"
1987	The Little and Large Show	Unknown	Episode: #7.3
1987	Bread	Boat-owner	Episode: #3.11
1988	Colin's Sandwich	Workman	Episode: "Pussyfoot"
1988	Christabel	Member of England committee	Episode: #1.2
1990	Poirot	Transport Superintendent	Episode: "The Kidnapped Prime Minister"
1991	Sleepers	Janitor	Episode: "On the Run"
1992	As Time Goes By	Taxi Driver	Episode: "Getting to Know You – Again"
1992	Screen One	Arnie Shaw	Episode: "Seconds Out"
1992	Bottom	Mr Man	Episode: "Parade"
1993	Birds of a Feather	G. Hamilton	Episode: "It Happened in Hollywood"
1994	Grange Hill	Park Keeper	Episode: #17.14
1994	The 10%ers	Man in Club	Episode: "A Small Package"
1994	Frank Stubbs Promotes	Caretaker	Episode: "Faith"
1989–1995	London's Burning	Bus Driver Caretaker	2 episodes
1996	Jack and Jeremy's Real Lives	Unknown	Episode: "Hospital Entrepreneurs"
1996	The Legacy of Reginald Perrin	Biscuit Man	Episode: #1.3
1997	Cadfael	Wat the Inn Keeper	Episode: "St. Peter's Fair"
1999	Real Women II	Karen's father	
2001	Love or Money	Mr. Wright	Television film
2000–2002	Time Gentleman Please	Pops	33 episodes
2005	Doctors	Reg Wincott	Episode: "The Last Laugh"
2005	The Green Green Grass	Sid	Episode: "One Flew Over the Cuckoo Clock"
2009	Casualty	Drunken Man	Episode: "No Fjords in Finland: Part 1"
2006–2010	My Family	Man in Bar Man in Ward	2 episodes
