= Roger Alborough =

British TV and Theatre actor appearing (born 1953)

- Born: 19 February 1953 (age 73)
- Occupation: Actor

Roger Alborough (born 19 February 1953) is a British TV and Theatre actor appearing in many dramas on the BBC, ITV, Channel 4 and in film. Recent work includes Black Mirror by Charlie Brooker Thieftakers 2, The 8 Days that Made Rome, Washington for The History Channel as General Braddock. Alborough has also appeared in Doctors, Silent Witness, The Queen as Sir William Heseltine, Body Story, Judge John Deed, EastEnders, The Bill, Mr Pye, Strife, Merlin of the Crystal Cave, and Unnatural Causes among others. In the BBC sitcom The Green Green Grass, Alborough played the part of Jonty in the 2005 Christmas Special episode "One Flew Over the Cuckoo Clock".

In 2018, Alborough played the role of The Professor in Ionesco's The Lesson at the award-winning Hope Theatre in London. He followed this with role of Tom in Goodnight Mr Tom at East Riding Theatre. In 2016, Alborough played the role of Andy Capp at the Finborough Theatre in London in a stage musical based on the long-running cartoon strip.

Films include Shaka Zulu as Hawkins, I Anna, Velvet Underground.

Roger has also played radical co-prime minister Peter Clement in the game Not for Broadcast.

West End includes Buddy and Jailhouse Rock. Up'n Under, Chasing Dragons at the Soho Theatre, African Snow at the Trafalgar Studios, Enjoy original cast at the Vaudeville, Annie Get Your Gun Haymarket.

== Filmography ==
=== Films ===
Film
Year	Title	Role	Notes
1998	Velvet Goldmine	Middle Age Man	
1999	Julie and the Cadillacs	Joe Tex	
2003	Please	Martin	(Short)
2009	Unscripted	Freeland Carter	(Short)
2013	I, Anna	Security Guard	
2015	Brothers of War	Frank Willis	
2015	Blue Borsalino	Frank Delaware	(Short)
2016	Last Chance Saloon	Barman	(Short)
2019	Once Upon a Time in London	Mr. Pickett	

=== TV ===
Television
Year	Title	Role	Notes
1980	Escape	2nd Policeman	(TV Movie)
1984	More Lives Than One	Sergeant	(TV Movie)
1986	Mr Pye	Sergeant	(TV Mini-Series), 1 episode, "Made for the Moonlight"
1988	Theatre Night	George Rous	(TV Series), 1 episode, "Strife"
1990	The Castle of Adventure	Army Sergeant	(TV Series), 1 episode, "Episode #1.1"
1990–2001	The Bill	Nossek (1990) / Charlie Basham (1993) / Mike Marshall (1998) / Roger Hargreaves (2000) / Ch. Supt. Draper (2001)	(TV Series), 5 episodes
1991	Merlin of the Crystal Cave	Uther	(TV Series), 5 episodes
1991–2001	Casualty	DS Cod (1991) / Detective Constable (1992) / Father Benson (2001)	(TV Series), 3 episodes, "Facing Up" "Will You Still Love Me?" and "Crash Course"
1993	Night of the Golden Brain	Mick	(TV Movie)
1993	Frank Stubbs Promotes	Moss	(TV Series), 1 episode, "Beginners"
1993	Unnatural Causes	Superintendent Maitland	(TV Movie)
1994–2005	EastEnders	Charles (1994) / Malcolm Kittle (2005)	(TV Series), 6 episodes
1995	London's Burning	Station Officer Grant	(TV Series), 1 episode, "Episode #8.2"
1996	Pie in the Sky	Plainclothes 1	(TV Series), 1 episode, "Chinese Whispers"
1997	Thief Takers	Officer Green	(TV Series), 1 episode, "Black Mist"
1998	Trial & Retribution	Sgt. Morris	(TV Series), 1 episode, "Part One"
1998	An Unsuitable Job for a Woman	Barman (uncredited)	(TV Series), 1 episode, "A Last Embrace"
1999	Body Story	John	(Documentary), 1 episode, "The Beast Within"
2001	Shaka Zulu: The Citadel	Hawkins (credited as Richard Alborough)	(American TV Movie)
2001	Poirot	Chief Constable Weston	(TV Series), 1 episode, "Evil Under the Sun"
2002–2005	Judge John Deed	Supt Craddock / Detective Sergeant Craddock / Det. Supt. Craddock	(TV Series), 4 episodes,
2003	My Hero	Patient Requesting Magazine	(TV Series), 1 episode, "The Family Way"
2003	Rosemary & Thyme	Sam Trent	(TV Series), 1 episode, "And No Birds Sing"
2003	The Debt	CS Baxter	(TV Movie)
2003–2015	Doctors	Christopher Moulding (2003) / Peter Mckenna (2006) / Henry Sumner (2009) / Ciarran O'Malley (2012) / Reece Williams (2015)	(TV Series), 5 episodes,
2005	The Green Green Grass	Jonty	(TV Series), 1 episode, "One Flew Over the Cuckoo Clock"
2006	Surviving Disaster	Anatoli Dyatlov	(TV Mini-Series), 1 episode, "Chernobyl Nuclear Disaster"
2009	The Queen	William Heseltine	(TV drama-documentary Series), 1 episode, "Episode 3:The Rivals"
2012	Silent Witness	DI Stroud	(TV Series), 2 episodes, "Paradise Lost: Part 1" and "Paradise Lost: Part 2"
2013	Lucan	Whitehouse	(TV Mini-Series), 1 episode,
2013	Drifters	Interviewer	(TV Series), 1 episode, "Work Experience"
2017	Emmerdale	Harry	(TV Series), 1 episode, "Episode #1.7741"
2017	Tina and Bobby	Rev. Michael Stone	(TV Mini-Series), 1 episode, "Episode #1.1"
2018	Patrick Melrose	Funeral Director	(TV Mini-Series), 1 episode, "At Last"
2019	The Feed	Devan	(TV Series), 1 episode, "Episode #1.4"
2019	Black Mirror	Joe	(TV Series), 1 episode, "Smithereens"
2020	Washington	General Braddock	(TV Mini-Series documentary), 1 episode, "Loyal Subject"

=== Video games ===
List of voice performances in video games
Year	Title	Role	Notes
2008	The Club	Renwick (voice)	
2022	Not For Broadcast	Peter Clement	Video Game
