= List of The Green Green Grass episodes =

The cast of The Green Green Grass with John Challis and Sue Holderness sitting at the centre

The following is a list of episodes for the British sitcom The Green Green Grass, that aired on BBC One from 9 September 2005 to 5 March 2009.

== Series overview ==
Series	Episodes	Originally released	
Series	Episodes	First released	Last released
1	7	9 September 2005	25 December 2005
2	8	15 September 2006	25 December 2006
3	8	2 November 2007	30 December 2007
4	9	8 January 2009	5 March 2009

== Episodes ==
=== Series 1 (2005) ===
No.	Title	Directed by	Written by	Running time	Original release date	UK viewers (millions)
Series
1	"Keep On Running"	Tony Dow	John Sullivan	30 minutes	9 September 2005	8.88
2	"A Rocky Start"	Tony Dow	John Sullivan	30 minutes	16 September 2005	6.34
3	"The Country Wife"	Tony Dow	John Sullivan	30 minutes	23 September 2005	5.86
4	"Hay Fever"	Tony Dow	John Sullivan	30 minutes	30 September 2005	6.33
5	"Pillow Talk"	Tony Dow	John Sullivan	30 minutes	7 October 2005	6.63
6	"Sex and the Country"	Tony Dow	John Sullivan	30 minutes	14 October 2005	6.40
Special
7	"One Flew Over the Cuckoo Clock"	Tony Dow	John Sullivan	50 minutes	25 December 2005	4.59

=== Series 2 (2006) ===
No.	Title	Directed by	Written by	Running time	Original release date	UK viewers (millions)
Series
8	"Testing Times"	Dewi Humphreys	Jim Sullivan	30 minutes	15 September 2006	5.04
9	"Here's to You, Mrs Boyce"	Dewi Humphreys	John Sullivan	30 minutes	22 September 2006	4.79
10	"Bothered and Bewildered"	Dewi Humphreys	Derren Litten and John Sullivan	30 minutes	29 September 2006	4.77
11	"Mother Earth"	Dewi Humphreys	Jim Sullivan	30 minutes	6 October 2006	5.01
12	"Schoolboy French"	Dewi Humphreys	James Windett and John Sullivan	30 minutes	13 October 2006	4.96
13	"More Questions Than Answers"	Dewi Humphreys	Paul Alexander	30 minutes	20 October 2006	3.90
14	"Brothers and Sisters"	Dewi Humphreys	Derren Litten	30 minutes	27 October 2006	5.28
Special
15	"From Here to Paternity"	Tony Dow	John Sullivan	45 minutes	25 December 2006	3.62

=== Series 3 (2007) ===
No.	Title	Directed by	Written by	Running time	Original release date	UK viewers (millions)
Series
16	"But Is It Art?"	Dewi Humphreys	Jim Sullivan	30 minutes	2 November 2007	5.34
17	"The Lonely Herdsman"	Dewi Humphreys	Jim Sullivan	30 minutes	9 November 2007	4.62
18	"If You Go Down to the Woods"	Dewi Humphreys	Jim Sullivan	30 minutes	23 November 2007	5.20
19	"Sweet Sorrow"	Dewi Humphreys	John Sullivan and Keith Lindsay	30 minutes	30 November 2007	6.05
20	"Fifteen Minutes"	Dewi Humphreys	David Cantor	30 minutes	7 December 2007	5.08
21	"The Final Curtain"	Dewi Humphreys	John Sullivan	30 minutes	14 December 2007	5.46
22	"Lust in Translation"	Dewi Humphreys	David Cantor	30 minutes	21 December 2007	4.32
Special
23	"The Special Relationship"	Dewi Humphreys	John Sullivan and Keith Lindsay	40 minutes	30 December 2007	5.40

=== Series 4 (2009) ===
No.	Title	Directed by	Written by	Running time	Original release date	UK viewers (millions)
Series
24	"The Path of True Love"	Dewi Humphreys	Jim Sullivan	30 minutes	8 January 2009	4.07
25	"Home Brew"	Dewi Humphreys	John Sullivan	30 minutes	15 January 2009	4.02
26	"Calendar Boys"	Dewi Humphreys	David Cantor	30 minutes	22 January 2009	3.86
27	"Animal Instincts"	Dewi Humphreys	Jim Sullivan	30 minutes	29 January 2009	3.87
28	"Your Cheating Art"	Dewi Humphreys	John Sullivan	30 minutes	5 February 2009	3.93
29	"The Departed"	Dewi Humphreys	Keith Lindsay	30 minutes	12 February 2009	3.73
30	"I Done It My Way"	Dewi Humphreys	John Sullivan	30 minutes	19 February 2009	3.46
31	"One Man's Junk"	Dewi Humphreys	Robert Evans	30 minutes	26 February 2009	3.70
32	"For Richer For Poorer"	Dewi Humphreys	Gary Lawson and John Phelps	30 minutes	5 March 2009	4.38

== Ratings ==
The Green Green Grass : UK viewers per episode (millions)

Season	Episode number									Average
Season	1	2	3	4	5	6	7	8	9	Average
1	9.13	6.34	5.86	6.33	6.63	6.40	4.59	–		6.43
2	5.04	4.79	4.77	5.01	4.96	3.90	5.28	3.62	–	4.67
3	5.34	4.62	5.20	6.05	5.08	5.46	4.32	5.40	–	5.18
4	4.07	4.02	3.86	3.87	3.93	3.73	3.46	3.70	4.38	3.89

Audience measurement performed by Broadcasters' Audience Research Board
