= A Thousand Stars Explode in the Sky =

A Thousand Stars Explode in the Sky is a play collaboratively written by David Eldridge, Robert Holman and Simon Stephens. It premiered at the Lyric Hammersmith on 7 May 2010 and ran until 5 June 2010.

== Summary ==
The end of the world is approaching, an apocalypse scheduled for a fortnight's time. As the universe begins to crumble a mother gathers her five sons on their family farm near Middlesbrough, where they prepare to face the unknown. A lifetime's worth of closely guarded secrets begin to unravel and a love once lost may again be found.

== Creative team ==
Directed by Sean Holmes
Designed by Jon Bausor
Lighting by Adam Silverman
Sound by Nick Manning

== Original cast ==
Kirsty Bushell
Nigel Cooke
Lisa Diveney
Harry McEntire
Ann Mitchell
Tanya Moodie
Tom Mothersdale
Pearce Quigley
Andrew Sheridan
Rupert Simonian
Alan Williams
