= Hardware (TV series) =

British sitcom television series

- Genre: Sitcom
- Created by: Simon Nye
- Starring: Martin Freeman; Peter Serafinowicz; Ken Morley; Ryan Cartwright; Susan Earl; Ella Kenion
- Opening theme: A Taste of Honey by Herb Alpert's Tijuana Brass
- Country of origin: United Kingdom
- Original language: English
- No. of series: 2
- No. of episodes: 12

Production
- Running time: 30 minutes
- Production company: Thames Television

Original release
- Network: ITV
- Release: 23 March 2003 – 11 April 2004

Hardware is a British sitcom that was broadcast on ITV from 23 March 2003 to 11 April 2004. Starring Martin Freeman, it was written and created by Simon Nye, the creator of Men Behaving Badly and directed by Ben Kellett.

The show's opening theme was "A Taste of Honey" by Herb Alpert's Tijuana Brass.

== Cast ==
- Martin Freeman – Mike
- Peter Serafinowicz – Kenny
- Ken Morley – Rex
- Ryan Cartwright – Steve
- Susan Earl – Anne
- Ella Kenion – Julie
- Iain Pearson – Brian McCampion

== Plot ==
Hardware is set in "Hamway's Hardware Store" in London, where main character Mike (Martin Freeman) works with Steve (Ryan Cartwright) and Kenny (Peter Serafinowicz) for shop owner Rex (Ken Morley). They relax at the next-door-but-one cafe, "Nice Day Cafe", where Mike's girlfriend Anne (Susan Earl) works with Julie (Ella Kenion). The series revolves around the store staff as they engage in a daily wisecrack battle with packs of DIY obsessed clients.

The exterior scenes were filmed at 237 and 241 Neasden Lane in Neasden.

== Episodes ==
The main cast of Hardware, from left to right: Susan Earl as Anne, Peter Serafinowicz as Kenny, Martin Freeman as Mike, Ryan Cartwright as Steve, Ken Morley as Rex, and Ella Kenion as Julie

=== Series overview ===
- Series 1: 23 March 2003 to 27 April 2003 (6 Episodes)
- Series 2: 7 March 2004 to 11 April 2004 (6 Episodes)

=== Series 1 (2003) ===
1. "Nice" (23 March 2003)
2. "Naked" (30 March 2003)
3. "Bondage" (6 April 2003)
4. "Finger" (13 April 2003)
5. "Women" (20 April 2003)
6. "Hutch" (27 April 2003)

=== Series 2 (2004) ===
1. "Bastard" (7 March 2004)
2. "Big Foot" (14 March 2004)
3. "Nude" (21 March 2004)
4. "Loser" (28 March 2004)
5. "Tony Two-Ways" (4 April 2004)
6. "Celebrity" (11 April 2004)

== DVD releases ==
The first series of Hardware is available on DVD in Region 4 (Australia). The complete series of Hardware was released in February 2009 in the UK on Region 2 from Network DVD.
