= Tom Bennett (actor) =

British actor

- Occupation: Actor
- Years active: 2003–present

Tom Bennett is a British actor. He played Christopher in PhoneShop and has appeared in Ricky Gervais’ After Life and Life on the Road as well as Mascots and Family Tree for Christopher Guest. He was nominated for The London Film Critics' Circle Award for British Actor of the Year for his role as Sir James Martin in Whit Stillman’s Love & Friendship and recently completed his record breaking run as Del Boy in Only Fools and Horses The Musical at The Theatre Royal Haymarket. He is currently playing Ulf White in Season 3 of HBO’s House of the Dragon.

He is a son of actor Colin Bennett.

His early television appearances include Shoot The Writers! (2004), a late night comedy sketch show that doubled as a competition for new writers. He starred in the E4 television series PhoneShop, playing the character 'Christopher'.

In 2013, he appeared in Family Tree (an HBO series) as best mate to Chris O'Dowd's character.

In 2016, he drew critical praise for his role as Sir James Martin, a foolish nobleman in the Jane Austen movie adaptation Love & Friendship.

In February 2019, he starred as Del Boy in Only Fools and Horses The Musical at the Theatre Royal Haymarket, which ran until March 2020 before taking a hiatus due to the COVID-19 pandemic. The show reopened on 1 October 2021 with Bennett reprising his role.

== Filmography ==
Year	Film	Role	Notes
2003	Foyle's War	Matthew Farley/Ben Barrett	TV series (2 episodes: 2003–2006)
2004	Shoot the Writers!	Various Characters	TV series
2004	Red Cap	Craftsman Simon Barham	TV series (1 episode: "Long Time Dead")
2004	The Worst Week of My Life	Bell Boy	TV series (1 episode: "Wednesday")
2004	Belonging	PC Cowley	TV movie
2004	Murder Prevention	Paul Cullen	TV series (2 episodes)
2005	My Hero	Unknown Character	TV series (1 episode: "Illegal Aliens")
2005	Life Begins	Financial Advisor	TV series (1 episode: "Under Pressure")
2005	The Booze Cruise II: The Treasure Hunt	Daniel	TV movie
2006	Midsomer Murders	Rob Pride	TV series (1 episode: "Dead Letters")
2006	Eastenders	Steve Clarke	TV series (5 episodes)
2006	Ultimate Force	Millar	TV series (1 episode: "Violet Solutions")
2006	Pulling	Estate Agent/Internet Guy	TV series (2 episodes: 2006–2008)
2007	The Bill	Ryan Chambers	TV series (1 episode: "Up in Smoke")
2007	Raging	Various Characters	TV movie
2008	Love Soup	Rik	TV series (1 episode: "The Menaced Assassin")
2008	Holby Blue	Matthew Green	TV series (1 episode: "Episode #2.2")
2008	Blessed	Jake	
2008	Doctors	Mr Robbin/Tony Depp/Max Porter	TV series (3 episodes: 2008–2014)
2009	Breathe	Marty	
2009	Minder	Hugo Grant	TV series (1 episode: "A Matter of Life and Debt")
2009	Comedy Showcase	Christopher	TV series (1 episode: "PhoneShop")
2009	PhoneShop	Christopher	TV series (19 episodes: 2009–2013)
2010	Silent Witness	DC Andy Salch	TV series (2 episodes)
2010	The Persuasionists	Waiter	TV series (1 episode: "Diet Stuff")
2011	The Comic Strip Presents...	Gordon's Driver	TV series (1 episode: "The Hunt for Tony Blair")
2011	Happy Birthday Jim		Short
2011	Girl in the Woods	Martin	Short
2012	Shadow Dancer	Watcher 2	
2012	Upstairs Downstairs	Tommy Soaper	TV series (1 episode: "The Love That Pays the Price")
2012	Them From That Thing	Various	TV mini-series (1 episode: "Episode #1.2")
2013	Great Night Out	Chris	TV series (1 episode: "Episode #1.1")
2013	Quick Cuts	Darren	TV series (1 episode: "Episode #1.1")
2013	Family Tree	Pete Stupples	TV series (8 episodes)
2014	Save the Date	Roger	TV movie
2014	Night Shift	Chris	Short
2014	Satan Has a Bushy Tail	Shuggy	Short
2015	Top Coppers	Steve	TV series (1 episode: "The Chill of the Cockney Freezer")
2015	Crackanory	Brian	TV series (1 episode: "The Zombie That Roared & the Sat Nav That Did It")
2015	Fungus the Bogeyman	Harry	TV mini-series (1 episode: "Episode #1.1")
2016	Love & Friendship	Sir James Martin	London Film Critics Circle Award for Best Supporting Actor of the Year; Nominated — Indiewire Critics Poll Award for Best Supporting Actor
2016	David Brent: Life on the Road	Nigel Martin	
2016	Mascots	Owen Golly, Jr.	
2017	Tina and Bobby	Del Simmonds	TV mini-series (2 episodes)
2017	Drunk History: UK	Eric Liddell/A.R. 'Dick' Collins	TV series (2 episodes)
2017	Murder in Successville	Michael McIntyre/Conor McGregor	TV series (2 episodes)
2017	Timewasters	Ronnie Scott	TV series
2018	A.P. Bio	Miles Leonard	TV series (6 episodes)
2018	Patrick	Ben	
2019	Rocketman	Fred	
2019	Resistance	Mark Sturgis	TV mini series (4 episodes)
2020–2022	After Life	The Nonce	TV series (3 episodes)
2024–present	House of the Dragon	Ulf White	TV series (Main role; 12 episodes)
2025	Wildcat	Galloway	
2025	Changing Ends	Nick	TV series (3 episodes)
