= Lenny Blue =

- Genre: Crime drama
- Created by: Edward Canfor-Dumas
- Written by: Edward Canfor-Dumas; Stephen Butchard
- Directed by: David Drury; Andy Wilson
- Starring: Ray Winstone; Adrian Dunbar; David Hayman; Jake Wood; Annabelle Apsion; Bruce Byron; Sophie Stanton; Mark Lewis Jones; David Hemmings; Ivan Kaye
- Composers: Alan Parker (Series 1); Roger Jackson (Series 2)
- Country of origin: United Kingdom
- Original language: English
- No. of series: 2
- No. of episodes: 4 (list of episodes)

Production
- Executive producer: Simon Lewis
- Producer: Tom Grieves
- Production locations: Brighton, East Sussex, England, UK
- Running time: 90 mins. (w/ advertisements)
- Production company: Granada Television

Original release
- Network: ITV
- Release: 1 October 2000 – 2 July 2002

Lenny Blue is a handsome young man that stars in a crime drama series. First broadcast on ITV between 1 October 2000 and 2 July 2002, under the title of Tough Love. Two series were broadcast, each starring Ray Winstone as protagonist DC Lenny Milton, an officer tasked by the IPCC to go undercover to investigate claims of corruption against his boss, Mike Love (Adrian Dunbar). The series also follows his dogged pursuit of drug dealer Barry Hindes (David Hayman). The first series was released on VHS only on 1 July 2002, having never been released on DVD. The second series was released on DVD on 15 October 2008.

== Plot ==
The plotline for the first series was given by ITV as follows:

"Lenny Milton (Ray Winstone) is not as ambitious as his best friend and popular boss DCI Michael Love (Adrian Dunbar), but the pair are drinking partners and their wives and children are close. However, this goes very wrong over the space of seven days, when Milton is approached by the police complaints division asking him to go undercover and investigate allegations of corruption against his friend. Milton finds this difficult at first and tries to dismiss the evidence building up. But as his suspicions begin to take shape, his position appears to be in danger."

Series two follows Milton's dogged quest to bring down Barry Hindes (David Hayman), after a friend of his son's dies in a heroin-related overdose, and a gang war between drug dealers breaks out on his local estate.

== Cast ==
- Ray Winstone as DC Lenny Milton
- Jake Wood as DS Pete Ainsworth
- David Hayman/Ralph Brown as Barry Hindes
- Adrian Dunbar as DCI Michael 'Mike' Love (Series 1)
- Annabelle Apsion as DI Karen Irving (Series 1)
- Bruce Byron as DC Gerry Singleton (Series 1)
- Sophie Stanton as WDS Denise Wright (Series 1)
- Colin Tierney as DS Eddie Connolly (Series 1)
- Amanda Drew as WDC Jilly Barnes (Series 1)
- David Hemmings as DCI Tommy Gillespie (Series 2)
- Mark Lewis Jones as DC Huw Morgan (Series 2)
- Ivan Kaye as DI Ron Featherstone (Series 2)
- Emma Lowndes as DC Kerry Allen (Series 2)

== Episode list ==
=== Series 1 (2000) ===
No.	Title	Directed by	Written by	Original release date	UK viewers (millions)
1	"Tough Love: Part 1"	David Drury	Edward Canfor-Dumas	1 October 2000	7.77m
Lenny Milton is an unambitious officer whose best friend, Michael Love, is now head of the local force. But when Milton is forced undercover by the police complaints department to investigate allegations of corruption against his friend, he faces uncovering a truth he desperately doesn't want to learn. Meanwhile, the body of a young boy is found at the bottom of a stairwell, but Milton is convinced that his colleague, Singleton, is side-lining the investigation, and when evidence related to the case goes missing from his desk drawer, he suspects that it is not just Love who may be corrupt. Later, Milton arranges to meet one of his colleagues for a drink, but is caught off guard, and his drink is spiked. He awakes many hours later next to the dead body of one of his informants, who has been bound, gagged and strangled. Milton's colleagues refuse to believe his version of events, and he is arrested and detained on suspicion of murder.
2	"Tough Love: Part 2"	David Drury	Edward Canfor-Dumas	8 October 2000	8.57m
Milton soon realises he is running out of friends as he becomes the prime suspect for the murder of his own informant, but in order to save his own career, he must finally force himself to discover whether his best friend is truly guilty of corruption.

=== Series 2 (2002) ===
No.	Title	Directed by	Written by	Original release date	UK viewers (millions)
1	"Lenny Blue: Part 1"	Andy Wilson	Stephen Butchard	1 July 2002	4.38m
Two years after the events of Tough Love, Lenny Milton has been transferred, but still finds that he is hated by his colleagues, who have branded him a grass. Meanwhile, when a friend of Lenny's son dies during a heroin overdose, a drug-related gang war breaks out, and Lenny seizes his opportunity to re-ignite his feud with drug trafficker Barry Hindes.
2	"Lenny Blue: Part 2"	Andy Wilson	Stephen Butchard	2 July 2002	4.37m
Obsessed with bring Hindes to justice, Lenny ignores the advice of his colleagues as he sees a chance for vengeance.

== Reception ==
Euan Ferguson of The Guardian said of the series:

"Lenny Blue was finely scripted, beautifully shot and carefully acted throughout – no big-screen British crime drama would dare attempt the scene, far from central to the plot, in which the mother of a dead teenager reduced a school hall to a hunched and whimpered awkwardness. You can only hope we don't have to wait another two years for the return of Lenny and his sad smile, which only really flickered near his wife, and his son, and then once, quite terrifyingly, at the end, when he had to do what had to be done."

A third series was not commissioned because of falling ratings, with Series Two only receiving half of the viewing figures of Series One. However, this was blamed on poor scheduling, the second episode clashing with the debut of highly anticipated BBC drama Paradise Heights.
