= Only Fools and Horses The Musical =

2019 British stage musical

Only Fools and Horses
- The Musical
- Official West End poster
- Music: Paul Whitehouse; Jim Sullivan; John Sullivan (additional); Chas Hodges (additional)
- Lyrics: Paul Whitehouse; Jim Sullivan; John Sullivan (additional); Chas Hodges (additional)
- Book: Paul Whitehouse; Jim Sullivan
- Basis: Only Fools and Horses by John Sullivan
- Premiere: 9 February 2019: Theatre Royal Haymarket, London
- Productions: 2019 West End; 2024 UK and Ireland tour

Only Fools and Horses The Musical is a 2019 British romantic comedy musical with book, music and lyrics by Paul Whitehouse and Jim Sullivan, and additional music by Chas Hodges and John Sullivan. It is based on John Sullivan's BBC television sitcom of the same name which ran from 1981 to 2003.

The musical premiered at the Theatre Royal Haymarket in February 2019 and played for over 1,000 performances until the end of April 2023.

== Plot ==
The story compresses 22 years and 64 episodes of the show into a two-hour tale in which Rodney and Cassandra are making wedding preparations, Boycie and Marlene are trying to conceive, and Del Boy goes to a dating agency looking for a "sort" and ends up with Raquel.

== Production history ==
=== World premiere: West End (2019–2023) ===
A musical adaptation of the BBC sitcom Only Fools and Horses was initially announced to be coming to the West End on 8 October 2018 and would be produced by Phil McIntyre Entertainments and written by Paul Whitehouse and Jim Sullivan. The initial casting announced Paul Whitehouse playing the role of Grandad, Tom Bennett as Del Boy and Ryan Hutton as Rodney. The musical was announced to have its first preview on 8 February 2019.

The musical made its world premiere at the Theatre Royal Haymarket on 9 February 2019, before opening officially on 19 February 2019. The production was directed and choreographed by Caroline Jay Ranger, with musical supervision, orchestrations and arrangements by Stuart Morley. Set and costume were designed by Liz Ascroft, with lighting design by Richard G Jones and Sound Design by Rory Madden.

Due to the COVID-19 pandemic in the United Kingdom mandating the closure of all theatres, the production was forced to take a lengthy hiatus. It reopened on 1 October 2021. The production closed on 29 April 2023 after over 1000 performances, making it the longest-running production in the Theatre Royal Haymarket's history.

=== UK and Ireland tour (2024-25) ===
On 27 October 2023, it was announced that the musical would begin a UK and Ireland tour on 23 September 2024 at the Churchill Theatre, Bromley, touring until 5 July 2025. It also included a Christmas season at the Hammersmith Apollo from 17 December 2024 until 5 January 2025. Whitehouse reprised his role as Grandad at certain venues, including the London season.

== Musical numbers ==
=== Original West End Production ===
==== Act I ====
- "Prologue – O Furtuna" – Orchestra (From Carmina Burana by Carl Orff)
  - Replaced by Only Fools and Horses Overture in 2022
- "His Name is Derek Trotter" – Cripps & Ensemble (Music & Lyrics by Paul Whitehouse and Chas Hodges)
- "Only Fools and Horses/Hooky Street" – Del Boy, Rodney & Ensemble (Music & Lyrics by John Sullivan, Additional Lyrics by Jim Sullivan)
- "Not Now Grandad" – Del Boy, Rodney & Grandad (Music & Lyrics by Paul Whitehouse)
- "That's What I Like" – Ensemble (Music & Lyrics by Chas Hodges and Dave Peacock)
- "Where Have All The Cockneys Gone?" – Grandad & Ensemble (Music & Lyrics by Paul Whitehouse and Chas Hodges)
- "The Girl" – Raquel (Music & Lyrics by Jim Sullivan, Additional Lyrics by Paul Whitehouse)
- "Mange Tout" – Del Boy & Dating Agent (Music & Lyrics by Paul Whitehouse)
- "Bit of a Sort" – Del Boy & Dating Agent (Music & Lyrics by Jim Sullivan)
- "Raining for Grandad" – Grandad (Music by Jim Sullivan, Lyrics by Paul Whitehouse)
- "Being a Villain" – Danny Driscoll & Tony Driscoll (Lyrics by Paul Whitehouse, Music by Paul Whitehouse and Stuart Morley)
- "Lovely Day" – Del Boy, Raquel, Grandad & Ensemble (Music & Lyrics by Bill Withers & Skip Scarborough)

==== Act II ====
- "Marriage & Love" – Rodney & Cassandra (Music & Lyrics by Paul Whitehouse)
- "West End Wendy" – Del Boy, Raquel & Ensemble (Lyrics by Paul Whitehouse, Music by Paul Whitehuse and Stuart Morley)
- "What have I let myself in for?" – Cassandra (Music & Lyrics by Paul Whitehouse)
- "Gaze Into My Ball" – Trigger & Ensemble (Lyrics by Paul Whitehouse, Music by Paul Whitehouse and Stuart Morley)
- "The Tadpole Song" – Boycie & Marlene (Music & Lyrics by Jim Sullivan)
- "Holding Back The Years" – Mrs Obookoo (Music & Lyrics by Mick Hucknall & Neil Moss)
- "Margate" – Ensemble (Music & Lyrics by Chas Hodges and Dave Peacock)
- "This Time Next Year" – Ensemble (Music & Lyrics by Chas Hodges and John Sullivan)

== Original cast and characters ==
Character	West End
Character	2019
Grandad / Uncle Albert	Paul Whitehouse*
Del Boy	Tom Bennett
Rodney	Ryan Hutton
Raquel	Dianne Pilkington
Cassandra	Pippa Duffy
Boycie	Jeff Nicholson
Marlene	Samantha Seager
Trigger	Peter Baker
Denzil	Adrian Irvine
Danny Driscoll	Pete Gallagher
Tony Driscoll	Adam Venus
Mickey Pearce	Chris Kiely
Dating Agent	Oscar Conlon-Morrey
Mrs Obooko/Wedding Fitter	Melanie Marshall
Mike the Barman	Andy Mace
Sid / Alternative Del Boy	Chris Bennett

- From 2022 All the following played by the same actor - Marlene/Cassandra, Mickey Pearce/Danny Driscoll, Mike The Barman/Tony Driscoll and Dating Agent/Sid

=== Notable West End replacements ===
- Grandad: Les Dennis. Andy Mace, who was the original Mike the Barman, later played Grandad.
- Raquel: Ashleigh Gray

== Critical reception ==
Peter Mason in the Morning Star newspaper described the production as "well conceived, well wrought and, above all, great fun", adding that "in general, the tenor of the stage interpretation is rather more emotional than the TV series, with more pathos and some darker moments."
