= Fly Into Danger =

1972 British children's TV series

- Created by: Roy Russell
- Written by: Roy Russell; David Stevens
- Directed by: Jonathan Wright Miller
- Starring: Louis Cabot; Sue Holderness
- Country of origin: United Kingdom
- Original language: English
- No. of series: 1
- No. of episodes: 7

Production
- Producer: David Foster
- Running time: 25 minutes
- Production company: ATV

Original release
- Network: ITV
- Release: 31 May – 12 July 1972

Fly Into Danger is a British children's television series created by ATV for ITV that aired in 1972.

== Story ==
At Chilford Green Aerodrome, a small, privately owned airfield. Newly hired young mechanic Chris Lomax and secretary Sarah Davenport discover that the cargo transported to the airfield is people that have been smuggled into the country.

== Cast ==
- Louis Cabot as Chris Lomax
- Sue Holderness as Sarah Davenport
- Leight Anthony as Lofty
- Bernard Kay as Gordon Ritchie
- Marc Maharaj as Chambra Lal
- Robert Keegan as Bill Hurst
- Sam Dastor as Moji Patel
- Mohan Singh as Bandara Lal
- Edward Peel as Jeff Strong
- Peter Miles as Andre Grelle
- Don McKillop as Farnworth

== Production ==
The aerodrome scenes were filmed at Halfpenny Green airfield at Stourbridge in Staffordshire. Sue Holderness could fly light aircraft but was only allowed to taxi about the airfield by the producers. The actual flight sequences were done by pilots Peter Smith, Barrie Shaw and Ray McKenzie-Blyth.

== Episodes ==
No.	Title	Directed by	Written by	Original release date
1	"Take-off"	Jonathan Wright Miller	Roy Russell	May 31, 1972
2	"In A Spin"	Jonathan Wright Miller	Roy Russell	June 7, 1972
3	"Grounded?"	Jonathan Wright Miller	Roy Russell	June 14, 1972
4	"Mayday Mayday"	Jonathan Wright Miller	Roy Russell	June 21, 1972
5	"Turbulence"	Jonathan Wright Miller	David Stevens	June 28, 1972
6	"Forced Take-off"	Jonathan Wright Miller	Roy Russell	July 5, 1972
7	"Final Approach"	Jonathan Wright Miller	Roy Russell	July 12, 1972

== Archive status and DVD release ==
All seven episodes exist, but only episodes 3, 5 and 7 exist as 2" colour videotape, and episodes 1, 2, 4 and 6 as 16mm black and white telerecordings. Network released the series on DVD in 2009, but only episodes 3 and 5 were presented in colour, as episode 7 was thought to only exist as a black and white telerecording until a colour videotape was discovered in the BFI National Archive.
