= Nigel Cooke =

British painter

- Born: 1973 (age 52–53); Manchester, UK
- Education: Nottingham Trent University BA; Royal College of Art MA; Goldsmiths College Ph.D
- Known for: Painting

Nigel Cooke (born 1973 in Manchester, England, UK) is a British painter who currently lives and works in Kent.

== Life and career ==
Nigel Cooke attended Nottingham Trent University at Undergraduate level (1991–1994) before completing a M.A at The Royal College of Art, London (1995–1997) and PHD from Goldsmiths (1998–2004). He is currently a visiting lecturer at the Royal College of Art, London.

== Artistic Practice ==
Nigel Cooke’s paintings depict carnivalesque figures set within harsh landscapes that are littered with urban decay. The paintings imply a strong sense of foreboding both through the depicted forms such as skulls and derelict buildings and also through his use of colour which often features bilious toxic greens. The paintings develop and change over a protracted period of time and are built up though many layers of oil paint. The paintings often balance different languages of paint within the same canvas. Vast areas of colour are combined with obsessively detailed figuration and in recent works Cooke has incorporated large sweeping gestural marks into his compositions.

== Collections ==
Cooke's work has been exhibited internationally and features in major museum collections including The Tate in London, The MOMA in New York and The Solomon R. Guggenheim museum in New York. He is currently represented by Pace Gallery in New York and London, and Blum & Poe in Los Angeles.

== Literature ==
- Darian Leader, Tony Godfrey, Marie Darrieussecq, Nigel Cooke, Phaidon, London, 2016
- Michael Bracewell, Martin Herbert, Nigel Cooke, Walter König, Cologne, 2011
