= The Impressionists (TV series) =

2006 film

- Genre: Docudrama
- Written by: Sarah Woods; Colin Swash
- Directed by: Tim Dunn
- Starring: Richard Armitage; Charlie Condou; Aidan Gillett; Julian Glover; Andrew Havill; Will Keen; Michael Muller
- No. of episodes: 3

Production
- Producer: Mary Downes
- Editor: Andrea Carnevali

Original release
- Network: BBC
- Release: 30 April – 14 May 2006

The Impressionists is a 2006 three-part factual docudrama produced by the BBC, which reconstructs the origins of the Impressionist art movement. The script was "based on archive letters, records and interviews from the time", and portrays painters Claude Monet, Édouard Manet, and Frédéric Bazille as young idealists taking on the Paris art establishment.

The series features Julian Glover as Old Claude Monet, while Richard Armitage plays Young Claude Monet in flashbacks. The first episode focused on Monet's memories of fellow artists Édouard Manet and Paul Cézanne.

The programme was shot on location in Provence and Normandy, at Claude Monet's home and garden at Giverny and at locations in the UK.

== Reception ==
A review in The Independent on Sunday said that "The Impressionists felt about as authentically French as one of those Croissant Express stalls at Euston Station." On the positive side, it called out Charlie Condou for giving "a super performance as a cheeky, daft-as-a-bruth Renoir" in the first episode, and "a few stunning Sunday in the Park with George moments moments when paintings bloom into life."

The Scotsman gave The Impressionists a more favourable review, saying it "makes for suitably breezy viewing...Art history was never this interesting and it's the personal dramas that capture the imagination." At the same time, it acknowledged that the show was "overdoing it with its sunny disposition" at times, pointing out that "being homeless and starving can't really have been as much fun as Monet, Renoir and co make it look".

Reviews in The Sunday Telegraph and New Statesman were critical and ridiculed the dialogue, which included lines such as "This is Paris and it's 1862."
