= Jack Doolan (actor) =

English actor (born 1987)

- Born: 28 July 1987 (age 39); England
- Occupation: Actor
- Years active: 1996–present
- Known for: The Green Green Grass

Jack Doolan (born 28 July 1987) is an English actor. He is best known for portraying Tyler Boyce in the BBC sitcom The Green Green Grass alongside John Challis and Sue Holderness (2005–2009). Doolan has guest starred in other television shows such as Spooks, EastEnders, The Bill and Peep Show and a lead part in Cemetery Junction, a comedy drama film by Ricky Gervais and Stephen Merchant.

== Filmography ==
=== Film ===
Year	Title	Role	Notes
2010	Cemetery Junction	Snork	
2011	Demons Never Die	James	
2012	The Facility	Toby	
2012	Cockneys vs Zombies	Davey Tuppence	
2012	May I Kill U?	Seth	
2013	Green Street 3	Gilly	
2013	It's a Lot	James	
2016	Bachelor Games	Terence	Originally titled Rules of the Game
2017	The Hatton Garden Job	Judas-Jack	
2022	The Nan Movie	Terry Taylor	
2022	Sisu	Wolf	
2026	The Cycle	Lenny	

=== Television ===
Year	Title	Role	Notes
1996, 2003	The Bill	Chris Fisher / Liam Foster	2 episodes
1998	Maisie Raine	Sam	Episode: "Go Bananas"
2003	Spooks	Jason Sweeney	Episode: "Spiders"; uncredited
2004	EastEnders	Lairy Lad	1 episode
2005–2009	The Green Green Grass	Tyler Boyce	30 episodes
2010	Peep Show	Door-to-Door Seller	Episode: "A Beautiful Mind"
2011	Comedy Showcase	Neil	Episode: "The Fun Police"
2011	Comedy Lab	Vincent	Episode: "Kabadasses"
2016–2018	Marcella	DC Mark Travis	15 episodes
2017–2019	White Gold	Andrew Davies	7 episodes
2019	Call The Midwife	George Sharp	Episode #8.5
2019	London Kills	Lee Matthews	Episode: "Sex Games"
2022	New Amsterdam	Colin	Episode: "Family"
2022	The Boys	Tommy TNT / voice of Horse Tommy	4 episodes
2023	Bookie	Bobby Knox	Episode: "Making Lemonade"
2024	The Day of the Jackal	DS Michael Gillespie	Episode #1.1
2025	The Abandons	Leslie Moran	Recurring role
