= Lisa Diveney =

British actress

- Born: Lisa Ann Diveney; 1984 (age 41–42); Newport, Wales
- Occupation: Actress
- Years active: 2005–present

Lisa Ann Diveney (born 1984) is a British actress, best known for playing Beth in the Only Fools and Horses spin-off The Green Green Grass. She has also appeared in an episode of BBC drama Call the Midwife.

== Career ==
John Sullivan cast Diveney in the role of Beth in The Green Green Grass where she appeared in Series 1–3. She then went on to appear in Cleansed directed by Sean Holmes at the Arcola Theatre and in Michael Grandage's production of John Gabriel Borkman for the Donmar Warehouse where Ian McDiarmid and Penelope Wilton headed the cast. In 2009 she played Young Enid in the biopic Enid starring Helena Bonham Carter.

Diveney portrayed Colette in the premiere of Frank McGuinness' play Greta Garbo Came to Donegal at the Tricycle Theatre alongside Michelle Fairley and Angeline Ball. Then appeared in the premiere of A Thousand Stars Explode in the Sky by David Eldridge, Robert Holman and Simon Stephens at the Lyric Hammersmith.

Diveney appeared as series regular Kate Travers in the ITV1 Drama Injustice where she played the on-screen daughter of James Purefoy and Dervla Kirwan. She then went on to play Bridget in Bijan Sheibani's production of Moonlight at the Donmar Warehouse, where she starred alongside David Bradley and Daniel Mays. Diveney played Julia Masterson in Series 2 of the BBC drama Call the Midwife.

In 2014 Diveney starred alongside Sir Tony Robinson and Imogen Stubbs in The Hypochondriac. and in the same year, appeared as Sasha in the premiere of Moses Raine's Donkey Heart directed by Nina Raine at the Old Red Lion which transferred to the Trafalgar Studios. Diveney then went on to play Masha in The Seagull at Regent's Park Open Air Theatre directed by Matthew Dunster.

In 2023, she reunited with Matthew Dunster to play Ruth in his production of Harold Pinter's The Homecoming at The Young Vic, starring alongside Jared Harris and Joe Cole.
