= Ella Kenion =

English actress (born 1968)

- Born: Ella Jane Kenion; 23 November 1968 (age 57); Primrose Hill, London, England
- Years active: 1995-present

Ella Jane Kenion (born 23 November 1968) is an English actress known for her appearances in comedy shows such as The Catherine Tate Show, The Green Green Grass, Five's sketch shows We Know Where You Live and Swinging.

Additionally, she played the role of Julie in the ITV series Hardware She is currently appearing in television commercials for The AA and appeared in the BBC children's television series Swashbuckle as Captain Sinker. She is a former newsreader for Talksport talk radio station.

== Filmography ==
Year	Title	Role	Notes
1995	Men of the World	Girl in Line-Up	Episode: "Stolen Kiss"
1996	Witness Against Hitler	Christina	TV movie
1997	We Know Where You Live	Various	12 episodes
2002	Black Books	Holiday 'Trash-Novel' Lady	Episode: "Fever"
2003-2004	Hardware	Julie	12 episodes
2004-2005	The Catherine Tate Show	Various	11 episodes
2004	Casualty	Maggie Curtis	Episode: "Dangerous Games"
2005-2009	The Green Green Grass	Mrs. Cakeworthy	30 episodes
2005	Planespotting	Radio Reporter	TV movie
2005	Swinging	Various	7 episodes
2005	Doc Martin	Boy's Mother	Episode: "Blood Is Thicker"
2005	Secret Smile	News Presenter	1 episode
2006	Rosemary & Thyme	Sharon Baker	Episode: "Enter Two Gardeners"
2006	The Impressionists	Suzanne Manet	1 episode
2006	Genie in the House	Miss Quaver	Episode: "Rock Me Amadeus"
2006	Fear of Fanny	Gwen Troake	TV movie
2007	Benidorm	Julie	1 episode
2008-2009	The Pinky and Perky Show	Tara / Vera (voices)	41 episodes
2008	The Commander: Abduction	Helen Gordon	TV movie
2009	Criminal Justice	Prison Nurse	1 episode
2010-2015	The Hive	Queen Bee / Grandma Bee / Mrs. Wasp (voices)	21 episodes
2010	Holby City	Dr. Paradis Bloom	Episode: "Bette Davis Eyes"
2010	Gayle Tuesday: The Comeback	Mimi	TV movie
2010	Brilliant!	Ruby	1 episode
2011-2019	Doctors	Veronica Clarke / Kate Mordan / Bex Boulderwood	3 episodes
2011	Doctor Who	Harriet	Episode: "Let's Kill Hitler"
2011	Comedy Showcase	Journalist	Episode: "The Fun Police"
2012	Gates	Mia	5 episodes
2012	Cuckoo	Anne Dixon	Episode: "Grandfather's Cat"
2013-2014	Q Pootle 5	Stella (voice)	52 episodes
2013-2016	Swashbuckle	Captain Sinker	102 / 104 episodes
2013	Heading Out	Dorcas	1 episode
2013	Big Bad World	Sandra	1 episode
2014-2017	Episodes	Matt's Publicist / Beth	3 episodes
2014	Law & Order: UK	Cashier	Episode: "Pride"
2014	Justin's House	Captain Sinker	Episode: "Pirate Day"
2014	Q Pootle 5: Pootle All the Way!	Eddi / Bud D / Ray (voices)	TV movie
2015	New Tricks	Laura Collins	Episode: "Prodigal Sons"
2017	Kiss of Death	Cynthia	Episode: "Highway to Hell"
2017	Detectorists	Receptionist	1 episode
2018-2020	101 Dalmatian Street	Mum / Delilah (voices)	8 episodes
2018	Midsomer Murders	Celeste Palmerston	Episode: "Death of the Small Coppers"
2018	Claude	Mrs. Mayor / Wanda Waxx	2 episodes
2018	Stan & Ollie	Holiday Camp Organiser	
2019	Pure	Lynne	1 episode
2019	Warren	Sandy	Episode: "The Father Figure"
2019	The Knight Before Christmas	Old Crone	
2020	Shakespeare & Hathaway: Private Investigators	Melanie Montague	Episode 3.9 "O Thou Invisible of Wine"
2022	Four Lives	Mandy Pearson	2 episodes
2023	Beyond Paradise	Dorothy Trowman	1 episode
2025	EastEnders	Dr Alburn	1 episode
