= Ivan Kaye =

British actor (b. 1961)

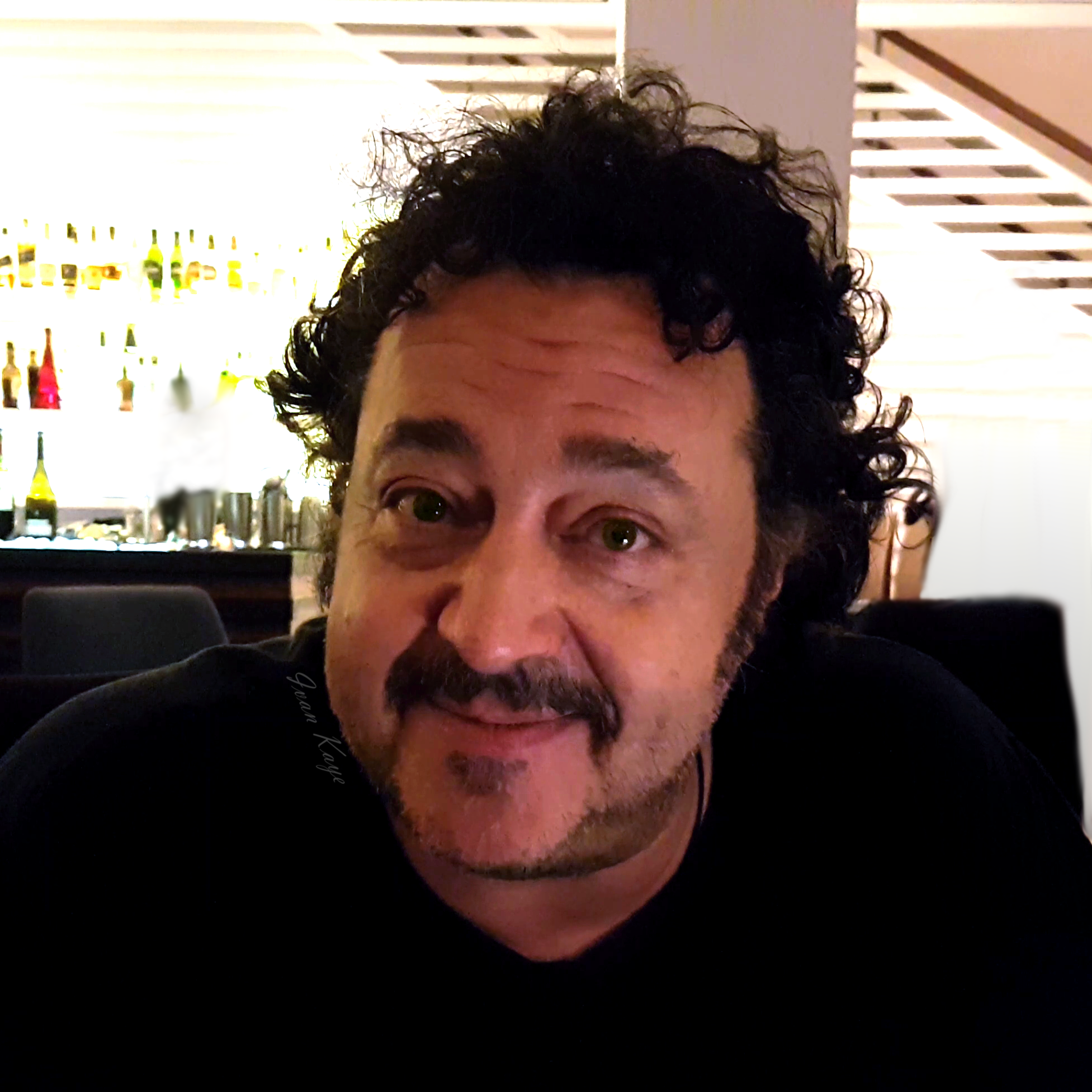
- Kaye in August 2019
- Born: Ivan Blakeley Kaye; 1 July 1961 (age 64); Northampton, Northamptonshire, England
- Occupations: Actor; producer
- Years active: 1987–present
- Children: 2

Ivan Blakeley Kaye (born 1 July 1961) is an English actor and producer. His international fame came with roles in historical drama shows like the Duke of Milan in all three seasons of The Borgias, and King Aelle in the first four Seasons of History channel's series Vikings. More recent projects include action thriller Gunpowder Milkshake, the series pilot for Amazon's adaptation of Stephen King's The Dark Tower, the first British original Disney+ series Wedding Season and a leading role in the Irish comedy feature film Apocalypse Clown. In the UK, he is also widely known for many TV roles, including stints on Bad Girls and Bugs, and his role as Bryan in the comedy series The Green Green Grass.

== Early life ==
Kaye was born on 1 July 1961 in Northampton, Northamptonshire. His passion for entertainment started in early childhood when he recreated television adverts at age two and performed shows with his friends throughout his childhood. As an eight-year-old boy, a key experience strengthened his enthusiasm and he joined a youth theatre group at age eleven, taking over organisational duties some years later. The only family member to have been involved in the entertainment industry before was Kaye's maternal grandmother who had been a musical star in the 1920s.

As his parents were social workers who moved frequently, Kaye attended thirteen different senior schools and experienced bullying along the way. It was in a school fight that he got his nose broken. As his parents ran hostels for mentally ill people, adolescents and delinquents, Kaye came in contact with various types of behaviours and people from an early age. According to his own appraisal, this experience has been a helpful factor for the development of his wide-ranging repertoire. While earning his degree in English Literature at the University of Kent at Canterbury on the insistence of his parents, he performed in as many student plays as possible and started his professional career right afterward, getting an agent after one of his first serious performances in his early twenties and making his first West End theatre appearance early on.

Hence Kaye had a successful theatre career already before starting his television work in his thirties. He decided to leave the theatre and turn to television in order to be able to spend time with his children while they were growing up because theatre performances in the evenings would have meant that he would not have been at home when they returned from school and university.

== Career ==
Kaye made his theatre debut in 1980 at Sadler's Wells Theatre in London as Willy Wonka in a stage version of Charlie and the Chocolate Factory. More theatre roles followed throughout the 1980s and 1990s, e.g. at the Royal National Theatre and the Piccadilly Theatre (The Rocky Horror Show).

In 1990, he started his television career by guest starring in the crime shows The Paradise Club and The Bill. In 1992 he played the leading part Sam Sterne in ITV's crime show Sam Saturday. Since then he has played almost 50 roles in television and, from 2004, in movies (Layer Cake, Control).

Kaye's roles in recent international productions include drug baron Polo Yakur in Assassination Games (2011), the Duke of Milan Ludovico Sforza in The Borgias (2011-2013), Joshua Collins, father of the main character Barnabas Collins (Johnny Depp) in Dark Shadows (2012), famous Viking warrior Ivar the Boneless in Hammer of the Gods (2013), pub landlord Mick Sturrock in BBC One's crime show The Coroner (2015-2016) and the Saxon King Aelle of Northumbria in History channel's period drama Vikings (2013-2017).

Aside from his villain roles as cold-blooded Polo Yakur (a "stand-out performance") and unscrupulous Duke Ludovico it is mainly his portrayal of King Aelle - in Vikings the deadly enemy and nemesis of the legendary hero of the show Ragnar Lothbrok (Travis Fimmel) - that has recently shaped Kaye's international profile. In his Twitter bio he describes himself as "Villain for Hire". His performances in the second part of season 4 of Vikings have been met with increased interest as his character King Aelle is of pivotal importance in the scenes of Ragnar's death and at the centre of attention during his own execution through the blood eagle torture inflicted by Ragnar's sons in revenge for the death of their father. In an interview on his character King Aelle in September 2017, Kaye contested the assessment of this antagonist as a villain - an assessment that had already been subject to disputes between parts of the audience.

Earlier internationally known roles include Reuben Starkadder in the television film Cold Comfort Farm (1995) and Adonija in the German-Italian-French co-production Solomon (1997). Mainly in the United Kingdom, Kaye is also known for his characters Dr. Jonathan Leroy in 27 episodes of the soap opera EastEnders in 2003-2004 and the herdsman Bryan in all of the episodes of the 4 Series television sitcom The Green Green Grass (2005-2009).

Up to 2021, Kaye has performed in four short films and, as a voice artist, he has lent his voice to characters in several video games like Warhammer 40,000: Fire Warrior (2003) and Star Wars: The Old Republic (2011) as well as starring as a main character in comedy episodes and short films produced by his own and Douglas McFerran's production company Comedy Ink Productions. From October 2017 to January 2018 he returned to the stage in the role of Tom Kettle in Jez Butterworth's play The Ferryman at Gielgud Theatre in London's West End.

In April and May 2018, Kaye came back to the small screen in the UK in his role as Pesca in the five part miniseries The Woman in White, a new BBC adaptation of Wilkie Collins' novel of the same name. A sneak peek review of British independent feature film For Love or Money: An Unromantic Comedy (released in the US on 15 March 2019) has emphasised his outstanding performance as the father of the main female character.

Kaye's more recent projects include Amazon's unreleased but reviewed pilot for an unrealised adaptation of Stephen King's The Dark Tower book series, starting with a prequel about the main character's youth based on book 4 Wizard and Glass and Navot Papushado's new action thriller Gunpowder Milkshake. The former has started filming in Split on 13 May 2019, the latter finished filming in August 2019 in Berlin and has been released in the US and several other countries in July 2021 and in the rest of the world in the following months. Kaye's own Comedy Ink short film Acter has been released in April 2020. In 2021, he has returned to TV series projects by joining the cast of the Father Brown spin-off Sister Boniface Mysteries produced by BBC Studios and released on 8 February 2022 on BritBox in the US as well as the first British original Disney+ series Wedding Season. With his part in the Irish comedy film Apocalypse Clown, filmed in 2022, Kaye plays a leading role again.

== Personal life and social engagement ==
Kaye also has knowledge of French and Spanish. As indicated by his first name he has Russian ancestry. Kaye, who has two adult daughters, lives in London.

Kaye supports the Our Disappearing Planet and the Mayhew animal charities. He also supports the campaign "Justice for Andrew Jones" which aims at bringing to court, the killers of a teenager, who was killed on the street in Liverpool, in 2003.

In 2021, Kaye joined The Celebs to record a cover of The Beatles song "Let It Be", in support of the Mind charity and released on 3 December 2021. Kaye was part of a choir of celebrities.

In September 2022, Kaye rejoined The Celebs to mark the 40th anniversary of the Michael Jackson classic album Thriller and raise money for Great Ormond Street Hospital, with a new rendition of the title track.

In 2023, Kaye reprised his role in The Celebs to perform in an original Christmas song called "So Delicious", which was followed in 2024 by a cover of the Beatles' "All You Need Is Love", both supporting Great Ormond Street Hospital.

== Filmography ==
Title	Role	Year
The Paradise Club	Arthur Burns	1990
The Bill	Alan Wilcock/David Collier/Watkins	1991–2010
Sam Saturday	DI Sam Saturday	1992
Men of the World	John	1994
Cold Comfort Farm	Reuben Starkadder	1995
Casualty	Guy/Simon Webster	1995–2001
Bugs	General Maliq	1996
Solomon	Adonijah	1997
Faith in the Future	Mark	1998
Microsoap	Roger Smart	1998–2000
A Dinner of Herbs	Dan Bannaman	2000
Metropolis	Hector	2000
Sunburn	Kidnapper	2000
The Peter Principle	Paulo	2000
The Armando Iannucci Shows		2000
Bad Girls	Charlie Atkins	2000–2001
Dinotopia	Catrone	2002
Lenny Blue	DI Featherstone	2002
Trial & Retribution VI	Bob Brickman	2002
London's Burning	Jimmy Watts	2002
The Eustace Bros.	Dennis Walton	2003
EastEnders	Dr. Jonathan Leroy	2004
Layer Cake	Freddie Hurst	2004
Control	Norton	2004
Inside the Mind of Paul Gascoigne	Narrator	2005
Self Portrait	Burton	2005
The Green Green Grass	Bryan	2005–2009
Brilliant	Colin	2007-2010
Holby City	Jimmy Furnival	2008
Chief	Chief	2011
Injustice	DS Harry Bowman	2011
The Borgias	Duke of Milan	2011–2013
Assassination Games	Polo Yakur	2011
Tortoise in Love	Sean	2012
Dark Shadows	Joshua Collins	2012
Hammer of the Gods	Ivar	2013
Top Hat	The Gentleman	2013
Sherlock Holmes Confidential	Sherlock Holmes	2013
Vikings	King Aelle of Northumbria	2013–2017
Undercover	Garabed	2015
The Coroner	Mick Sturrock	2015–2016
The Woman in White	Pesca	2018
For Love or Money	Patrick	2019
Cliffs of Freedom	Ghazi Khalif	2019
The King	Lord Scrope	2019
Acter	Ivan Kaye - Actor	2020
The Dark Tower	Mayor Hart Thorin	2020
Gunpowder Milkshake	Yankee	2021
The Dead Collectors	Peter	2021
End of Term	Garth Stroman	2021
Sister Boniface Mysteries	Ted Button	2022-2023
Wedding Season	Mr. Delaney	2022
Apocalypse Clown	The Great Alphonso	2023
Brian and Maggie	Nigel Lawson	2025
Target Zero	Agent K	post-production
Angela	Alex	completed

== Theatre ==
West End Theatre;

- (1987) Play. Serious Money. Wyndham's Theatre. Zac Zackerman.
- (1990) Musical. The Rocky Horror Show. Piccadilly Theatre. Eddie/Dr. Scott.
- (1993) Play. On The Piste. Garrick Theatre. Dave.
- (1994) Play. A View from the Bridge. Strand Theatre. Marco.
- (2000) Play. In Flame. Ambassadors. Matt / Frank / Fabrizio.
- (2017-2018) Play. The Ferryman. Gielgud Theatre. Tom Kettle.

National Theatre;

- (1988) Play. The Changeling. National Theatre. Don Pedro.
- (1988) Play. The Magic Olympical Games. National Theatre. Magus.
- (1989) Play. Ghetto. National Theatre. Kruk/ Sasha Molevsky.
- (1992) Play. Fuente Ovejuna. National Theatre. Dan Manrique.

Other;

- (1980) Musical. Charlie and the Chocolate Factory. Sadler's Wells/Sheffield Crucible. Willy Wonka.
- (1984) Play. In Nomine Patris. Edinburgh/King's Head Dad. (Fringe First)
- (1984) Review. The Floodlight's Review. Edinburgh. Various Roles/+Writer. (Nominated for Perrier)
- (1985) Musical. Sammy's Magic Garden. Edinburgh Festival/Latchmere. Compost.
- (1986) Play. Rosencrantz and Guildenstern Are Dead. Latchmere. Player King.
- (1987) Panto. Cinderella. Latchmere. Ugly Sister.
- (1994) Play. A View from the Bridge. Bristol Old Vic/Birmingham Rep. Marco.
- (1996) Musical. Lock up your Daughters. Chichester Festival Theatre. Ramble.
- (1999) Play. In Flame. Bush Theatre. Matt/ Frank / Fabrizio.
- (2002) Play. Teeth 'n' Smiles. Sheffield Crucible. Saraffian.
