= David Ross (actor) =

English theatre, cinema and television actor (born 1945)

- Born: 19 January 1945 (age 81); Blackburn, Lancashire, England
- Occupation: Actor
- Years active: 1974–present

David Ross (born 19 January 1945) is an English actor who has worked in theatre, cinema and television. His best-known roles include playing the first Kryten and the second Talkie Toaster in science-fiction comedy Red Dwarf, Elgin Sparrowhawk in the BBC One sitcom The Green Green Grass, and as Mr. Sedley in a 1998 serial adaptation of William Makepeace Thackeray's novel Vanity Fair., and Mr Bumble, the beadle, in the 1999 TV Adaptation of Oliver Twist.

Ross also played Inspector Martin in The Adventures of Sherlock Holmes, Mr. Sherwin in Basil, a cheating betting shop owner in the BBC One comedy Goodnight Sweetheart, Basil Tyler (a kind-natured, well-meaning cab driver and postman who was unlucky in love) in John Sullivan's BBC comedy drama Roger Roger, and Donald Moss (a DHSS officer) in Alan Bleasdale's Boys from the Blackstuff. On BBC Radio 2 in 1985, Ross starred alongside Jack Smethurst in the second series of A Proper Charlie (a comedy by Vince Powell, in which Madge Hindle also featured). In 1989, he appeared as a Registrar in an episode of the comedy Watching.

In 1991, Ross appeared in a second major Bleasdale drama series, G.B.H. He has also appeared in Doc Martin and in the final episode of the long-running comedy series Last of the Summer Wine (2010).

Ross starred in Bleasdale's stage play Having a Ball, set in a vasectomy clinic. It was a success in the UK but a box-office disaster in Australia where it was presented by John McCallum. The play co-starred Jacki Weaver and Maggie Dence.

In 2016, Ross appeared in the crime thriller Monochrome. In 2017, he reprised his role of Talkie Toaster in the Red Dwarf XII episode "Mechocracy".
