= John Challis =

English actor (1942–2021)

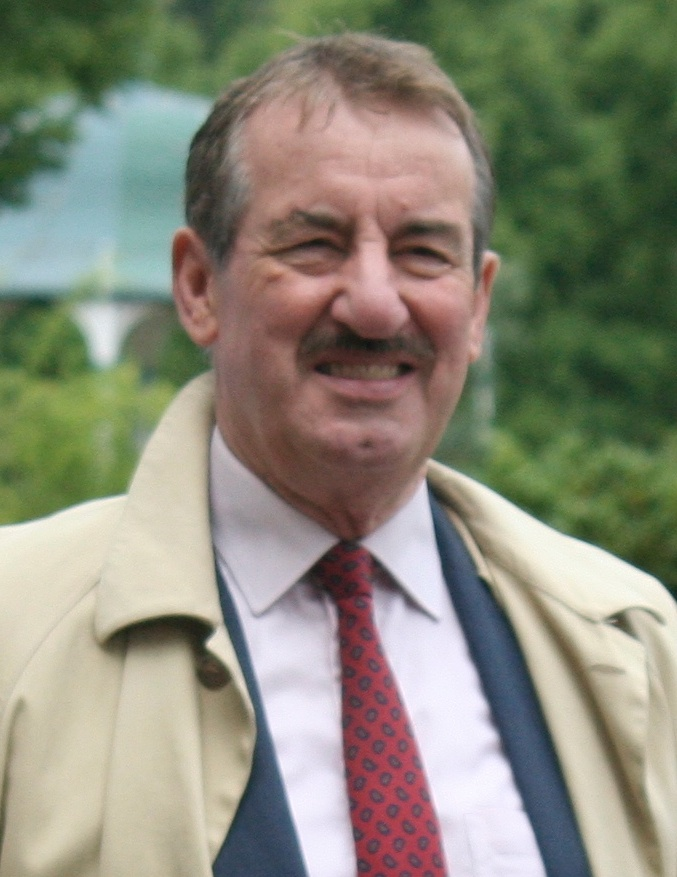
- Challis in 2013
- Born: John Spurley Challis; 16 August 1942; Clifton, Bristol, England
- Died: 17 September 2021 (aged 79); England
- Education: Ottershaw School
- Occupation: Actor
- Years active: 1964–2021
- Spouses: Carol Robertson (m. 1966, divorced); Debbie Arnold (m. 1981; div. 1985); Sabina Franklyn (m. 1987; div. 1988); Carol Davies (m. 1995)

John Spurley Challis (16 August 1942 – 17 September 2021) was an English actor. He had an extensive theatre and television career but is best known for portraying Terrance Aubrey "Boycie" Boyce in the long-running BBC Television sitcom Only Fools and Horses (1981–2003) and its sequel/spin-off The Green Green Grass (2005–2009), as well as Monty Staines from the seventh series onwards in the ITV sitcom Benidorm (2015–2018). Challis was an established stage actor, making appearances for companies including the Royal Shakespeare Company and the National Theatre.

== Early life ==
John Spurley Challis was born on 16 August 1942 at St Andrews Nursing Home Clifton, Bristol, England. An only child, his family moved to southeast London when he was a year old. He grew up in Epsom, after the family moved to Tadworth in Surrey. Challis attended the state boarding Ottershaw School near Woking, Surrey. His father, Alec, was a civil servant at the Admiralty; his mother, Joan (née Harden), was a drama teacher and keen participant in amateur dramatics.

After leaving school, he worked as a trainee estate agent, before he "ran away with the Argyle Theatre for Youth".

== Career ==
=== Television and radio ===
At the outset of his television career, the 6 feet 1 inch (1.85 m) tall Challis was often typecast in authority roles. His first television role was in the BBC soap opera The Newcomers in 1967. Another early television role, also in 1967 was as a thief who stole Ena Sharples' handbag in Coronation Street; he would later have a recurring role in the series as Detective Sergeant Norman Phillips from 1975 to 1977. 1969 he played in the gangster drama Big Breadwinner Hog, and between 1971 and 1975 Challis made regular appearances in Z-Cars as Sergeant Culshaw. In 1971, he played the part of photographer Jim Wright in the highly popular tv soap Crossroads.

The sitcom Bloomers (1979), starring Richard Beckinsale, was written about Challis's experience working at a garden centre while taking a break from acting.

A role in the John Sullivan sitcom Citizen Smith led to Challis being cast as Herman Aubrey "Boycie" Boyce in Only Fools and Horses (1981—2003), which became his best-known role. Sullivan also created a spin-off for Challis, The Green Green Grass (2005—2009). The outdoor scenes of The Green Green Grass were filmed at his then-home at Wigmore Abbey, surrounding fields and local villages.

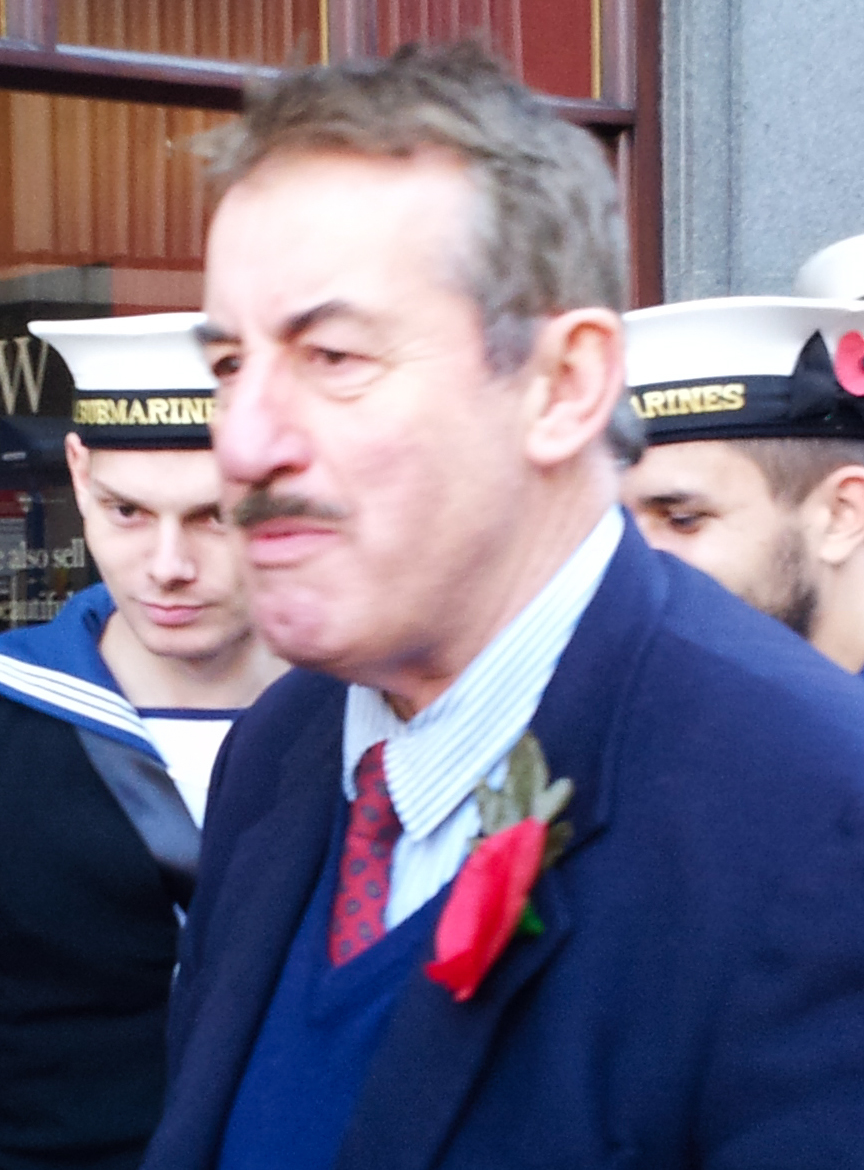
Challis in November 2013, with crew from HMS Talent

His other television appearances include Dixon of Dock Green, Thriller, The Sweeney, Doctor Who (The Seeds of Doom), Dracula, Beau Geste, Juliet Bravo, Bloomers, Ever Decreasing Circles, Doctor Snuggles, Chance in a Million, The Bill, One Foot in the Grave, Open All Hours, The New Statesman, Don't Wait Up, Soldier Soldier, Brass Eye, My Family, In Sickness and in Health, Benidorm, the end of which he felt spelt the end of his television career, and Heartbeat. During his appearance in a 1997 Channel 4 mockumentary Brass Eye television episode "Decline", he was tricked into believing Clive Anderson had been shot by Noel Edmonds. In 2006 he took a cameo role in BBC's The Impressionists as the stationmaster at the Gare Saint Lazare. In the 2008 episode "Is Jeremy Quite Safe?" of Last of the Summer Wine he guest-starred as a retired jewel thief with fanciful stories of his past exploits in the South of France. In 2012, he narrated the National Geographic Channel series Strippers: Cars for Cash.

On BBC radio, he played an interrogator in the play Rules of Asylum by James Follett, broadcast by BBC Radio 4 in 1973. He also played Dibden Purlew in Getting Nowhere Fast from 2001 to 2004.

He became an honorary citizen of Serbia, where Only Fools and Horses remains popular. In 2020, Challis made the documentary Boycie in Belgrade, exploring why the show was so beloved in Serbia.

=== Theatre ===
Challis performed many stage roles, including with the Royal Shakespeare Company in the 1960s and the National Theatre. His first performance in London's West End was in Portrait of a Queen in 1965 at the Vaudeville Theatre. In 1977 he played a leading role at the Orange Tree Theatre in Richmond, in Sam Walters' production of Václav Havel's play The Memorandum. In 1979 he toured the US with Tom Stoppard's play Cahoot's Macbeth.

His work at the National Theatre included productions of On the Razzle (1979) and The Rivals (1983), with Michael Hordern, and Laughter on the 23rd Floor with Frank Finlay. In a 1993 tour with the National he starred along with Barbara Windsor, Kenneth Waller, and Christopher Villiers in a production of Entertaining Mr Sloane by Joe Orton. He appeared with Sue Holderness ('Marlene' in Only Fools and Horses) in Ayckbourn's Relatively Speaking, Time and Time Again and How the Other Half Loves, and the National Theatre's own production of Boycie and Marlene.

In 1995, at the height of the success of Only Fools and Horses, as an established Shakespeare actor he returned to the stage to appear in Richard III and A Midsummer Night's Dream at Regent's Park Open Air Theatre, and in 2000 he played Malvolio in Twelfth Night, at Stafford Castle and he performed at Ludlow Castle in As You Like It in 2011.

He was also featured regularly in pantomime productions in which he usually played the roguish or wicked roles, such as for example, Captain Hook in Peter Pan at the Plaza Theatre, Stockport, a role he reprised in 2018 at the Theatre Royal, Nottingham. He also appeared in pantomime at Weston Playhouse in winter 2011–12 playing Ebenezer in Aladdin and as King Rat in Dick Whittington at the Plaza over Christmas 2013 and New Year 2014. In 2013, Challis occasionally contributed to the Hitchhiker's Guide to the Galaxy Live Tour as the narrator. In 2014, he began a theatre tour of his one-man show titled Only Fools and Boycie, which charted his life before, during and after his time as Boycie.

== Personal life ==
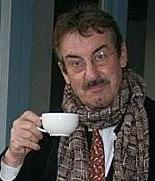
Challis in 2007

Challis was married four times. His first wife, Carol Robertson (1934–2023), was a stage manager and actress. His second and third wives were actresses Debbie Arnold and Sabina Franklyn. He married his fourth wife, Carol Davies, in Brighton in 1995. In 1998, they bought the Abbot's Lodgings at Wigmore Abbey Grange, Adforton, Herefordshire, which they proceeded to renovate. He had no children.

Challis was a patron of the British Hedgehog Preservation Society. He was an avid Arsenal supporter and the club paid tribute to him following his death. Challis wrote two volumes of autobiography, Being Boycie and Boycie & Beyond. In 2016, he wrote Wigmore Abbey: The Treasure of Mortimer about the renovation of his house's gardens.

Challis additionally was a patron and avid supporter of "The Rose Theatre" in Kidderminster, Worcestershire. The organisation also paid special tribute to Challis after his death.

Through Twitter, Challis became friends with American actor and musician Ice-T, with the pair exchanging gifts although never meeting in person.

== Death ==
Challis died of cancer in his sleep on 17 September 2021, aged 79. His death was reported two days later. He had been diagnosed with the disease in 2019.

Tributes were paid by a number of fellow actors and entertainers including his Only Fools and Horses co-stars Sir David Jason and Sue Holderness, as well as Ice-T, Paul Chuckle, Piers Morgan and Sheila Ferguson.

== Filmography ==
=== Film ===
Year	Title	Role	Notes	Ref(s)
1964	Where Has Poor Mickey Gone?	Tim		
1971	Say Hello to Yesterday	Salesman	Uncredited	
1981	Burning an Illusion	Man in Car		
1985	Defence of the Realm	Challis		
1989	Spotters	General cast		
1998	The Tichborne Claimant	Rous the Landlord		
2000	Five Seconds to Spare	Shopping Centre Manager		
2001	Dream	Toby		
2001	Subterrain			
2015	Tea for Two	Jim	Short film	
2020	Boycie in Belgrade	Himself	Documentary film	

=== Television ===
Year	Title	Role	Notes	Ref(s)
1967	The Newcomers	Harry Kapper	5 episodes	
1967-1977	Coronation Street	George Naylor/DC Norman Phillips	10 episodes	
1967-1975	Z-Cars	Detective Constable Armitage/Sgt. Culshaw	14 episodes	
1968	City '68	Hospital Doctor	Episode: "The Old Country"	
1968	Virgin of the Secret Service	Captain Kirby	Episode: "The Rajah and the Suffragette"	
1968	Mr. Rose	Detective Constable Jackson	Episode: "The Frozen Swede"	
1968	Softly, Softly	DC Rankin	2 episodes	
1969	Big Breadwinner Hog	First Operative	Episode: "Self-Discipline Is Its Own Reward"	
1969	Who-Dun-It	Rev. Lindsay Whittaker	Episode: "An Embarrassment of Murder"	
1969	Dixon of Dock Green	Ray	Episode: "Obsession"	
1969	Canterbury Tales	Farmhand	Episode: "The Shipman's Tale"	
1969	Strange Report	Soldier	Episode: "Report 7931: Sniper – When Is Your Cousin Not?"	
1971	Brett	Riordan	Episode: "All the King's Horses..."	
1971	Crossroads	Jim Wright	9 episodes	
1972	ITV Sunday Night Theatre	Factory Guard	Episode: "The Last Journey"	
1974	Who Killed Lamb?	Casson	TV film	
1974	Dracula	Stockton-on-Tees Clerk	TV film	
1974	Crown Court	Detective Inspector Stoddard	Episode: "The Messenger Boy"	
1975	Drive Carefully, Darling	'Ego'	Instructional film	
1975	Nightingale's Boys	Pete	Episode: "Decision"	
1975	The Sweeney	Skef Warren	Episode: "Stay Lucky Eh?"	
1975	The Legend of Robin Hood	Castle Guard	Episode: "Part 5"	
1976	Doctor Who	Scorby	Serial: The Seeds of Doom	
1976	Open All Hours	Bread Man	Episode: "Well Catered Funeral"	
1976	Thriller	Peter	Episode: "Sleepwalker"	
1976	The Cedar Tree	Leonard Barnet	Episodes: "Mice at Play Part 1" and "Mice at Play Part 2"	
1976	The New Avengers	Soldier (unbilled)	Episode: "Dirtier by the Dozen"	
1979	Doctor Snuggles	Various	Voice; All 13 episodes	
1979	Bloomers	Policeman	Episode: #1.3	
1980	Citizen Smith	Chief Inspector Humphreys	Episode: "The Letter of the Law"	
1980-1981	Play for Today	Victor Mintell/Harry/Voice Role	3 episodes	
1981	Sink or Swim	Man at Door	Episode: "Ecology"	
1981–1996, 2001–2003	Only Fools and Horses	Aubrey "Boycie" Boyce	33 episodes	
1982	Beau Geste	Corporal Dupré	4 episodes (part 4–7)	
1985	Late Starter	Policeman	Episode: #1.5	
1985	Storyboard	Billy Cato	Episode: "King & Castle"	
1985	In Sickness and in Health	Policeman	Episode: #1.1	
1985	Juliet Bravo	Taylor	Episode: "Hostage to Fortune"	
1985	Howards' Way	Morris	2 episodes	
1986	Chance in a Million	Policeman	Episode: "And What Shall We Do for a Ring?"	
1986	Strike It Rich!	Big John	Episode: "Suspicions"	
1986	Roland Rat: The Series	Policeman	Episode: #1.6	
1986	Lenny Henry Tonite	Various	Episode: "Gronk Zillman"	
1987	C.A.T.S. Eyes	Stark	Episode: "A Naval Affair"	
1987	Ratman	Police Chief	2 episodes	
1987	Alas Smith and Jones	Mexican Hotel Receptionist	Episode: #4.4	
1987	Ever Decreasing Circles	Maintenance Man	Episode: "Half an Office"	
1988	40 Minutes	General cast	Episode: "Scarfe's Follies"	
1988	Wish Me Luck	Victor Travussini	5 episodes	
1988	Don't Wait Up	Man in Jewellery Shop	Episode: #5.2	
1988	The Bill	Ian Gore	Episode: "Runaround"	
1988	Casualty	Harry	Episode: "Living Memories"	
1992	Sitting Pretty	Boris	Voice; Episode: "Anniversary Waltz"	
1992	The New Statesman	General Giray	Episode: "A Bigger Splash"	
1992	One Foot in the Grave	Jack the Burglar (voice)	Episode: "Beware the Trickster on the Roof"	
1992	Sitting Pretty	The Trainer	Voice; Episode: "Happy Birthdays"	
1993	Then Churchill Said to Me	Major Harry Bouchet	Episode: "Nanny by Searchlight"	
1996	Soldier Soldier	Police Superintendent	Episode: "Delayed Action"	
1997	Wing and a Prayer	DS Doughty	Episode: "The Ties That Bind"	
1997	Brass Eye	Himself	Episode: “Decline”	
1998	Heartbeat	Stan Fraser	Episode: "Where There's a Will"	
2005–2009	The Green Green Grass	Aubrey "Boycie" Boyce	All 32 episodes	
2006	The Impressionists	Station Master	Episode: #1.2	
2007	My Family	Jacob Marley	Episode: "Ho Ho No"	
2008	Last of the Summer Wine	Jeremy	Episode: "Is Jeremy Quite Safe?"	
2015–2018	Benidorm	Monty Staines	15 episodes	
2015	Doctors	Freddy Prenton	Episode: "Vapour Trail"	
2016	Are You Being Served?	Captain Peacock	TV film	
2018	Sooty	Henry Witham-Smythe	Episode: "Just Desserts"	
2020	Državni posao	Aubrey "Boycie" Boyce	Episode: "Dostavno vozilo"	

== Books ==
- 2011, Being Boycie, Wigmore Books Ltd., ISBN 978-0956906106
- 2012, Boycie & Beyond, Wigmore Books Ltd., ISBN 978-0956906113
- 2016, Wigmore Abbey: The Treasure of Mortimer, (photography by Alex Ramsey), Wigmore Books Ltd., ISBN 978-0956906144
