= Jim Sullivan (writer) =

English television screenwriter

- Born: James Sullivan; 19 April 1978 (age 48)
- Occupation: Screenwriter
- Parent: John Sullivan (father)
- Writing career
- Period: 2006 – present
- Notable work: The Green Green Grass

James Sullivan (born 19 April 1978) is a British television screenwriter. He is best known for writing seven episodes of The Green Green Grass.

== Family ==
Jim's father, John Sullivan, was the writer and creator of Citizen Smith (1977–1980) and Only Fools and Horses (1981–2003).

== Career ==
Sullivan wrote seven episodes for his late father's Only Fools and Horses spin-off The Green Green Grass.

Sullivan helped write the Only Fools and Horses Sport Relief special in 2014 alongside his brother Dan Sullivan by incorporating some of their late father's old notes and bits of dialogue for the show that he never found a place for.

Sullivan wrote He Who Dares..., a fictional autobiography that was released by Ebury Press in October 2015.

Sullivan, alongside Rod Green, also wrote Only Fools and Horses: The Peckham Archives, which was released by Ebury Press in October 2016.

Sullivan announced in July 2018 that he had written You Know It Makes Sense, Lessons from the Derek Trotter School of Business (and life). It was released by Ebury Press in November 2018.

Sullivan announced in July 2018 that he and Paul Whitehouse had written Only Fools and Horses The Musical, which launched on 9 February 2019 at the Theatre Royal Haymarket, London.

== Works ==
- The Green Green Grass (2006–2009)
- Only Fools and Horses Sport Relief special (2014)
- Only Fools and Horses The Musical (2019)
