= Sue Holderness =

English actress

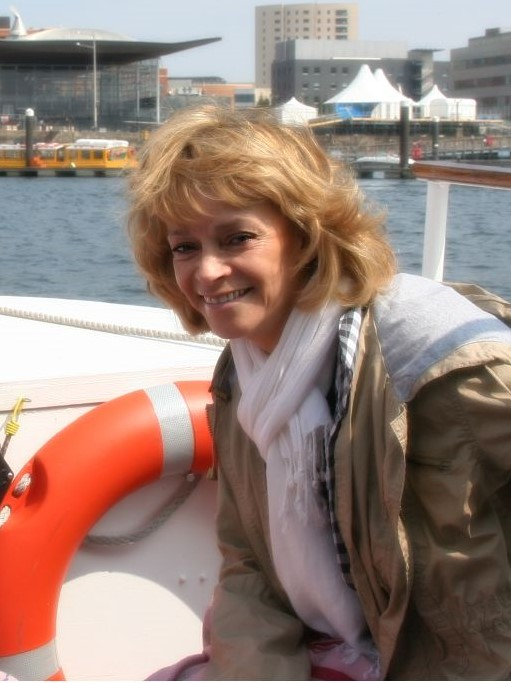
- Holderness in 2011
- Born: Susan Joan Holderness; 28 May 1949 (age 77); Hampstead, London, England
- Other name: Susan Holderness
- Occupation: Actress
- Years active: 1967–present
- Spouse: Mark Piper (m. 1989)
- Children: 2

Susan Joan Holderness (born 28 May 1949) is an English actress. While predominantly active in theatre, she has made appearances in a number of films and television series such as Bless This House (1974), The New Avengers (1977), Canned Laughter (1979), The Sandbaggers (1980), The Cleopatras and It Takes a Worried Man (1983), The Brief and Minder (1984), Doctors (2004, 2011, 2014), Still Open All Hours (2018–2019) EastEnders and The Madame Blanc Mysteries (2021). However, she is best known for her role as Marlene Boyce in Only Fools and Horses from 1985 to 2003, and its spin-off The Green Green Grass from 2005 to 2009.

== Career ==
Holderness was born on 28 May 1949, in Hampstead, London. After taking her A-levels, she trained at the Central School of Speech and Drama.

She began her acting career with the Manchester 69 Theatre Company in A Midsummer Night's Dream, Peer Gynt and as Desdemona in Catch My Soul (Jack Good's rock-musical version of Othello). She has worked consistently in theatre, radio, film and television. West End plays include The Female Odd Couple, Why Not Stay for Breakfast, The Male of the Species and the highly acclaimed one-woman play Our Kid (based on Myra Hindley).

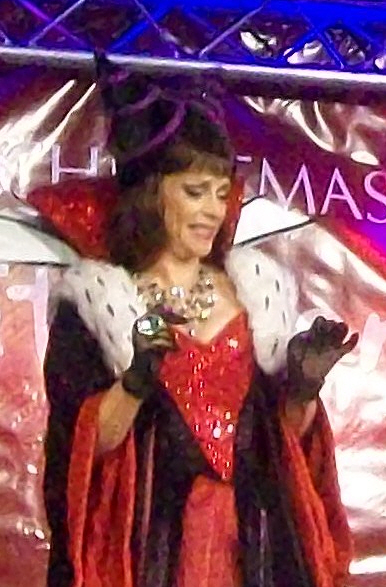
Sue Holderness at the Stevenage Christmas Lights Switch-on, 18 November 2010

Holderness regularly appeared in The Vagina Monologues and she was in the cast of the touring play Seven Deadly Sins Four Deadly Sinners. She has toured the country in numerous plays and worked in several repertory companies. Much of her career has been spent performing in Alan Ayckbourn plays, three of which (Relatively Speaking, Time and Time Again, and How the Other Half Loves) she toured with John Challis.

Holderness played the role of Annie in the 2010 & 2011 UK Tours of Calendar Girls. She played Celia in the 2012 tour (Jan – May) and went back to playing Annie in the Autumn 2012 tour (Sep – December).

Television roles include Marianne in The Sandbaggers (two series), Bless This House, as Pamela Huntley-Johnson in the episode The Bells Are Ringing (1974), as Liz in It Takes a Worried Man (two series), Jo in The Brief, Cleopatra IV in The Cleopatras; as Laura Doolan, a wife of serial bigamist "Confident" Clive Cosgrove in the Minder episode "A Number of Old Wives Tales" (1984); episodes of The New Avengers, Thriller, Sob Sisters, Growing Pains, Doctors, Lime Street with Robert Wagner, and Murder in Suburbia.

She played a prominent role as Marlene, wife to Boycie (played by John Challis) in Only Fools And Horses and the spin-off series The Green, Green Grass, which ran from 2005 – 2009, including four series and three Christmas Specials.

She played Rowan Atkinson's love interest, Lorraine, in Canned Laughter, and did numerous impersonations in two series of End of Part One. She played Maggie in Dear John, by John Sullivan, Joan Forrester (Oscar Blaketon's former wife) in Heartbeat for YTV, Joan Travis in Revelations, and Rachel's mother in Cold Feet, also for Granada. In April 2021, she made a guest appearance in the BBC soap opera EastEnders as Estelle.

Films include That'll Be the Day (1973) and It Could Happen to You (a.k.a. Intimate Teenage Secrets) (1976). She also appeared in the low budget feature Meat Draw and Out of Sight for Granada.

Holderness regularly appears in pantomime. including All You Need for Christmas at Fareham, Hampshire in 2009.

In 2014, Holderness appeared in the BBC One medical drama Casualty as Alice Sweeney. In 2018-2019 she appeared as Mrs Rossi in series five and six of the sitcom Still Open All Hours.

From 2021 to 2025 she starred as Judith Lloyd-James in The Madame Blanc Mysteries.

== Personal life ==
Holderness is married to Mark Piper, former executive director of the Theatre Royal, Windsor. She has two grown up children and three grandchildren (2024.

== Filmography ==
=== Film ===
Year	Title	Role	Notes
1973	That'll Be The Day	Shirley	
1976	It Could Happen to You	Christine	
1998	The Meat Draw	Carmen	

=== Television ===
Year	Title	Role	Notes
1971	Lollipop	Receptionist	Episode: "Doctor Fruit Cake"
1972	Tightrope	Joanna	5 episodes
1972	Fly Into Danger	Sarah Davenport	All 7 episodes
1972	Harriet's Back in Town	Jennifer Grant	2 episodes
1974	Bless This House	Pamela Huntley-Johnson	Episode: "The Bells Are Ringing"
1975	Thriller	Betty	Episode: "If It's a Man, Hang Up"
1976	4 Idle Hands	Miss Pemberton	Episode: "Out of the Frying Pan"
1977	The New Avengers	Victoria Stanton	Episode: "Medium Rare"
1978	The One and Only Phyllis Dixey	Mildred Challenger	TV film
1979	Canned Laughter	Lorraine	TV film
1979–1980	End of Part One	Various	All 14 episodes
1980	The Sandbaggers	Marianne Straker	8 episodes
1983	The Cleopatras	Cleopatra IV	2 episodes
1983	It Takes a Worried Man	Liz	13 episodes
1984	The Brief	Jo Gould	All 13 episodes
1984	Minder	Laura	Episode: "A Number of Old Wives Tales"
1985–1996, 2001–2003	Only Fools and Horses	Marlene Boyce	20 episodes
1986–1987	Dear John	Maggie	3 episodes
1989	Sob Sisters	Marion	Episode: "I Don't Think We're in Kansas Anymore"
1989	Young, Gifted and Broke	Diane	Episode: #1.7
1992	Growing Pains	Various	Episode: "The Lady and the Tramp"
1993	You, Me and It	Sonia	Episode: #1.2
1993	Heartbeat	Joan Forrester	2 episodes
1996	Revelations	Joan	11 episodes
1998	Out of Sight	Bride's Mother	Episode: "Photo Finish"
1998	Colour Blind	Mrs. Barton	Episode: #1.2
2000, 2003	Cold Feet	Mary Bradley	2 episodes
2004	Murder in Suburbia	Penny Gregson	Episode: "Sanctuary"
2004	Doctors	Sheila Kelly	Episode: "Watching Myself Die"
2005–2009	The Green Green Grass	Marlene Boyce	All 32 episodes
2011	Doctors	Beryl Mellor	Episode: "Light Blue Touch Paper"
2012	Crime Stories	Hazel Wood	Episode: #1.11
2013	Casualty	Alice Sweeney	Episode: "Between the Cracks"
2014	Doctors	Rose Day	Episode: "Scullery Boy"
2018–2019	Still Open All Hours	Mrs. Rossi	10 episodes
2020	Holby City	Gloria Davidson	Episode: #22.10
2021	EastEnders	Estelle Jones	4 episodes
2021–present	The Madame Blanc Mysteries	Judith	28 episodes
