= List of Only Fools and Horses characters =

This is a list of characters from the BBC sitcom Only Fools and Horses, its spin-off series The Green Green Grass, and its prequel series Rock & Chips.

== Overview ==
Character	Played by	Series														Appearances
Character	Played by	Only Fools and Horses							The Green Green Grass				Rock & Chips			Appearances
Character	Played by	1	2	3	4	5	6	7	1	2	3	4	1	2	3	Appearances
Del Trotter	David Jason															69
Del Trotter	James Buckley															69
Rodney Trotter	Nicholas Lyndhurst															66
Ted Trotter	Lennard Pearce															27
Ted Trotter	Phil Daniels															27
Albert Trotter	Buster Merryfield															39
Cassandra Trotter	Gwyneth Strong															22
Raquel Turner	Tessa Peake-Jones															22
Boycie	John Challis															68
Boycie	Stephen Lloyd															68
Trigger	Roger Lloyd-Pack															44
Trigger	Lewis Osborne															44
Denzil Tulser	Paul Barber															24
Denzil Tulser	Ashley Jerlach															24
Marlene Boyce	Sue Holderness															52
Mike Fisher	Kenneth MacDonald															32
Sid	Roy Heather															14
Mickey Pearce	Patrick Murray															22
Damien Trotter	Patrick MacManus															12
Damien Trotter	Grant Stevens															12
Damien Trotter	Robert Liddement															12
Damien Trotter	Jamie Smith															12
Damien Trotter	Douglas Hodge															12
Damien Trotter	Ben Smith															12
Tyler Boyce	Jack Doolan															36
Tyler Boyce	Various babies															36
Joan Trotter	Kellie Bright															4
Joan Trotter	N/A															4
Reg Trotter	Peter Woodthorpe															5
Reg Trotter	Shaun Dingwall															5
Frederick "Freddie the Frog" Robdal	Nicholas Lyndhurst															4
Danny Driscoll	Roy Marsden															4
Tony Driscoll	Christopher Ryan															4

== Regular characters ==
Character	Actor	First appearance	Last appearance	Duration	Episodes
Del Boy	David Jason (James Buckley in Rock & Chips)	"Big Brother"	Euro 2020 Message from Del Boy	1981–2003, 2014, 2021	64
Rodney	Nicholas Lyndhurst	"Big Brother"	2014 Sport Relief special	1981–2003, 2014	64
Grandad	Lennard Pearce (Phil Daniels in Rock & Chips)	"Big Brother"	"Licensed to Drill"	1981–1984	22
Uncle Albert	Buster Merryfield	"Strained Relations"	"The Comic Relief Special"	1985–1997	37

== Recurring characters ==
=== Major ===
Character	Actor	First appearance	Last appearance	Duration	Episodes
Trigger	Roger Lloyd-Pack (Lewis Osbourne in Rock & Chips)	"Big Brother"	"Sleepless in Peckham"	1981–2003	39
Boycie	John Challis (Stephen Lloyd in Rock & Chips)	"Go West Young Man"	"Sleepless in Peckham"	1981–2009	33
Sid	Roy Heather	"The Long Legs of the Law"	"Sleepless in Peckham"	1982–2003	13
Mickey Pearce	Patrick Murray	"Healthy Competition"	"Sleepless in Peckham"	1983–2003	20
Slater	Jim Broadbent (Callum McNab in Rock & Chips)	"May the Force Be with You"	"The Class of '62"	1983, 1985, 1991	3
Denzil	Paul Barber (Ashley Gerlach in Rock & Chips)	"Who's a Pretty Boy?"	"Sleepless in Peckham"	1983–2003	18
Mike	Kenneth MacDonald	"Who's a Pretty Boy?"	"Time On Our Hands"	1983–1996	30
Marlene	Sue Holderness	"Sleeping Dogs Lie"	"Sleepless in Peckham"	1985–2009	20
Raquel	Tessa Peake-Jones	"Dates"	"Sleepless in Peckham"	1988–2003	20
Cassandra	Gwyneth Strong	"Yuppy Love"	"Sleepless in Peckham"	1989–2003	21
Alan Parry	Denis Lill	"Little Problems"	"Mother Nature's Son"	1989–1992	8
Damien	Various	"Three Men, a Woman and a Baby"	"Sleepless in Peckham"	1991–2003	11

=== Minor ===
==== PC Terry Hoskins ====
Police Constable Terence "Terry" Hoskins (Christopher Mitchell) appeared in two episodes – "May the Force Be with You" and "To Hull and Back'". He works alongside Roy Slater but does not like him. Slater often makes him miss lunch and watch suspects whilst Slater is away. He has a conversation with Del Boy, in which it is revealed Del Boy sold Terry's mother a gas fire, advising Del to tell Slater who stole a microwave he was accused of stealing. In "To Hull and Back", Slater's superiors suspect him of diamond smuggling and order Terry to keep an eye on Slater, with Terry driving Slater into a police sting at the end of the episode.

==== Jevon ====
Jevon (Steven Woodcock) is a friend of Rodney and Mickey Pearce, first seen in "Dates". Unlike Mickey, Jevon is successful with women, though to his chagrin Cassandra Parry rebuffed him when he asked her to dance. He was even more surprised when she agreed to dance with Rodney. Jevon set up a trading partnership with Mickey Pearce, which lasted throughout the sixth series. They apparently gave up on the trading business at the end of that series, though, following a run in with the Driscoll brothers which left them both in plaster. Jevon made one further appearance in "The Jolly Boys' Outing", after which Woodcock left the series to take the role of Clyde Tavernier in EastEnders and the character was not seen again. He appeared in "The Jolly Boys' Outing", "Little Problems", "Sickness & Wealth", "Yuppy Love" and "Dates'".

==== Nerys ====
"Nervous" Nerys (Andrée Bernard) was the Nag's Head barmaid who appeared in two episodes, "Dates'" and "Sickness and Wealth". She briefly dated Rodney, although she was left terrified when a gang of yobs chased them in the van. Nerys was later scared again when she interrupted the séance that the Trotters were attending.

==== Alan and Pamela Parry ====
Alan (Denis Lill) and Pamela Parry (Wanda Ventham) made infrequent appearances during series six and seven. They are Cassandra's parents, and subsequently Rodney's in-laws.

Alan is the owner of a successful printing firm, Parry Print Ltd, which employs Rodney from 1989 to 1991, and later becomes a friend of Del Boy. Despite being a successful businessman by the time he met Del, Alan, who used to live on a council estate in the area, often ending up drunk or getting sick after eating too many jellied eels whilst under Del's influence, much to the chagrin of more overtly middle-class Pam. They are both in attendance at Damien's christening in "Miami Twice".

==== Roy Slater ====
DCI Roy Slater (Jim Broadbent in Only Fools and Horses and Calum MacNab in Rock & Chips) appeared in three episodes – '"May the Force Be with You", "To Hull and Back" and "The Class of '62". A much-reviled ex-schoolmate of Del, Slater was a corrupt policeman and (as revealed in "The Class of '62") the ex-husband of Raquel Turner. He was sent to prison for diamond smuggling after the events of "To Hull and Back". Slater also appears in the prequel Rock & Chips, where he is barely tolerated by Del and the others as a member of their gang, as his friendship with them is at this point obviously falling apart. In "Five Gold Rings", he leaves school to become a police cadet, and arrests Del and Jumbo for selling illegal American records (although he is rebuffed by his sergeant, who goes on to keep the records for himself and lets Del and Jumbo go with a warning). This is the last time Slater is seen, as he does not appear in "The Frog and the Pussycat".

==== June Snell ====
June Snell (Diane Langton) is an ex-girlfriend of Del Boy's from many years previously. They meet up again when Rodney dates June's daughter Debbie in "Happy Returns", which Del scuppers in the false assumption that Debbie is his daughter.

Del and June fall out when June reveals that Debbie's real father is Del's best friend Albie Littlewood, and Del in turn admits that he had been cheating on her with Albie's girlfriend Deidre. They are later reconciled again, however, as Del invited June to the opera in "A Royal Flush" with Rodney and his date Lady Victoria. He and June ruin the evening and embarrass Rodney by noisily eating snacks and arguing with other audience members. The evening then comes to an end after June becomes ill from eating too much and vomits (off screen) over an audience member sitting in front of her.

Aside from Debbie, June has another child, a son named Jason.

==== Chris ====
Chris (Tony Marshall) is a friend of Rodney and Mickey Pearce, first seen in "Dates". He also appears in "Rodney Come Home" and in the dream sequence at the start of"Mother Nature's Son".

==== Barmaids ====
Throughout the run of Only Fools and Horses, there were various barmaids employed at the Nag's Head. Aside from Nerys, they only filled relatively minor roles, speaking only the occasional one-liner or flirting with Del.

- Joyce (Peta Bernard) appeared in two episodes of the first series.
- Julie (Julie La Rousse) appeared in five episodes over the second and third series; however, La Rousse was credited for only her second appearance.
- Karen (Michele Winstanley) appeared in four episodes of the third series. In all her appearances, she was credited as Michèle Winstanley.
- Vicky (Kim Clifford) appeared in the Christmas special "To Hull and Back".
- Maureen (Nula Conwell) appeared in five episodes over the fourth and fifth series.

== Trotter relatives ==
=== Joan Trotter ===
Joan Trotter
- Rock & Chips character
- Portrayed by: Kellie Bright (2010–2011)
- Duration: 1996, 2010–2011
- First appearance: Time on Our Hands (1996, voice only); Rock & Chips (2010)
- Last appearance: The Frog and the Pussycat (2011)
- Created by: John Sullivan
In-universe information
- Occupation: Cinema ice-cream girl Part-time Filing Clerk; Tealady
- Father: Derek Hollins
- Mother: Mavis Hollins
- Husband: Reg Trotter
- Sons: Derek Trotter; Rodney Trotter
- Grandsons: Damien Trotter
- Granddaughters: Joan Trotter II
- Grandfathers: John Hollins; Stanley Stubbs
- Grandmothers: Eliza Hollins; Edwina Stubbs

Joan Mavis "Joanie" Trotter is Del and Rodney's late beloved mother, and wife of Reg. Though she is never seen in the series, she is often mentioned by Del, especially in his attempts to emotionally blackmail Rodney, who had few memories of her. Del loved his mother deeply, and still mourns her death. Over the series, it became clear to Rodney and the viewers, but not always to Del, that Joan had had a series of affairs with numerous men during her loveless marriage to Del's selfish, workshy father Reg. One such affair was with local "gentleman thief" Freddie Robdal and resulted in the birth of Rodney. She died on 12 March 1964 of an unknown illness while Rodney was still very young.

Her tombstone, a flamboyant fibreglass monument, is also seen occasionally. In "The Yellow Peril", Del paints it yellow, not realising that the paint is luminous. In "Danger UXD", they dress up the blow up dolls in Joan's old clothes in order to get them out of the flat without being noticed. After the Trotters became millionaires, Del returns to their now deserted flat and remembers his mother telling him he could not have the day off school with a hangover because he was due to sit his 11-plus (the actress who provides this voiceover is uncredited). When Cassandra and Rodney have their baby in "Sleepless in Peckham", they name her Joan.

The character makes her first screen appearance in Rock & Chips. She is portrayed as a hard-working woman in her late 30s, struggling to maintain a home, which included her workshy husband Reg, elderly father-in-law Ted and her teenage son, Del Boy. She has an affair with Freddie Robdal, a friend of Reg recently released from prison, and soon discovers she is pregnant. Joan and Freddie's affair is not one of lust; they seem to love each other genuinely and Joan loves both her sons deeply. She is willing to leave Reg altogether and run away with Freddie to Bournemouth to raise Rodney with him but would only do so once she was sure Del was financially secure. She tries her best to help Del's relationship and hopeful eventual marriage to a rich man's daughter, but the relationship does not work, and Joan ultimately chooses to remain in Peckham for Del's sake. Joan is a huge fan of Hollywood films and actresses, given her job in the Ritz cinema, to the point that she changed her hairstyle multiple times during Rock & Chips to resemble actresses such as Marilyn Monroe, Elizabeth Taylor, Jane Fonda and Audrey Hepburn.

=== Reg Trotter ===
Reg Trotter
- Only Fools and Horses character
- Portrayed by: Peter Woodthorpe (1983); Shaun Dingwall (2010–2011)
- Duration: 1983, 2010–2011
- First appearance: Thicker than Water (1983)
- Last appearance: The Frog and the Pussycat (2011)
- Created by: John Sullivan
In-universe information
- Occupation: Unemployed; Hospital porter
- Father: Ted Trotter
- Mother: Vi Trotter
- Wife: Joan Hollins
- Sons: Derek Trotter
- Stepsons: Rodney Trotter
- Grandsons: Damien Trotter
- Granddaughters: Joan Trotter II (step-granddaughter)
- Grandfathers: Jack Trotter Snr
- Grandmothers: Victoria Trotter
- Uncles: Albert Trotter; George Trotter; Jack Trotter
- First cousins: Stan Trotter; Gillian Trotter

Reginald "Reg" Trotter is the estranged father of Del Boy, stepfather of Rodney, and son of Grandad.

Reg abandons his family shortly after the death of his wife Joan. He leaves on Del's 16th birthday, taking his cake and Rodney's piggy bank. Eighteen years later he returns, in the episode "Thicker than Water", claiming to have a hereditary blood disorder. When the results reveal Del and Rodney to have different blood groups, he attempts to split the family by questioning Del's paternity. He quickly leaves once it becomes known that he has forged the test results himself and is never heard from again. As with their mother, he is often mentioned by Del in other episodes. It was revealed in the final episode "Sleepless in Peckham" that Rodney is not in fact Reg's biological son, but Freddie Robdal's. It is also shown in Rock & Chips he is an abusive husband to Joan, earning him the hatred of Del and Freddie, and has an affair with Nag's Head barmaid Val.

=== Vi Trotter ===
Violet Trotter
- Only Fools and Horses character
- Portrayed by: Paula Wilcox
- Duration: 2010–2011
- First appearance: Rock and Chips
- Last appearance: "The Frog and the Pussycat" (2011)
- Created by: John Sullivan
In-universe information
- Occupation: Cleaner
- Husband: Ted Trotter
- Sons: Reg Trotter
- Grandsons: Derek Trotter; Rodney Trotter (step-grandson)
- First cousins: Trevor
- Other relatives: Damien Trotter; Joan Trotter II

Violet "Vi" Trotter was the estranged, sharp-tongued wife of Ted Trotter, mother of Reg and the paternal grandmother of Del Boy.

Long dead by Only Fools and Horses, Vi first appeared in the second and third episodes of the prequel Rock & Chips, "Five Gold Rings" and "The Frog and the Pussycat", in which she babysat the infant Rodney – much to the fury of her husband, who resented her for throwing him out after she had discovered his affair with Alice Ball, Trigger's grandmother. Despite her contempt for her husband, Vi maintained a friendly relationship with her son, grandson and daughter-in-law, and doted on Rodney. Vi mentioned she worked as the charlady for an art dealer, as Del mentioned in "Yesterday Never Comes"; however, she did not mention that she had stolen a valuable artwork from her employer. According to Del's autobiography, she became ill in 1963 and died the following year, shortly after Joan.

=== Freddie Robdal ===
Freddie Robdal
- Only Fools and Horses character
- Portrayed by: Nicholas Lyndhurst
- Duration: 2010–2011
- First appearance: "Rock & Chips" (2010)
- Last appearance: "The Frog and the Pussycat" (2011)
- Created by: John Sullivan
In-universe information
- Occupation: Frogman; Gangster; Criminal; Unemployed
- Sons: Rodney Trotter
- Granddaughters: Joan Trotter II
- First cousins: Norman

Frederick "Freddie" Robdal, also known by his nickname Freddie the Frog, was an unseen character in the original series. He is first mentioned in "The Frog's Legacy" and later revealed to be Rodney's biological father. Robdal was a career thief who had been a frogman in the Royal Navy, hence the nickname, and had an extramarital affair with Joan Trotter. Robdal died shortly afterwards, when he accidentally sat on his own detonator during a bank robbery. The Trotters' search for his hidden gold legacy was the focal point of the episode "The Frog's Legacy". When an old photograph of Robdal surfaces in the episode "Sleepless in Peckham", his striking resemblance to Rodney finally settled the issue of the latter's paternity after years of speculation.

He has an unnamed wife who he is separated from by the time he has an affair with Joan (as mentioned by Reenie Turpin).

Robdal is one of the main characters in the Only Fools and Horses prequel Rock & Chips, where he is accompanied by explosive expert Gerald "Jelly" Kelly and has a habit of calling people "cocker", among them Del Boy and Boycie. The first episode of Rock & Chips fully reveals the details surrounding Robdal's affair with Joan which resulted in Rodney's birth. He and Jelly, along with Reg, Ted, and Del's gang embark on their first Jolly Boys' Outing to Margate in June 1960, although the trip is merely a ruse so that Robdal and Kelly can rob a nearby jewellery store. It is revealed in the second episode, "Five Gold Rings", that Robdal did in fact love Joan deeply and wanted to see his son grow up, but it was difficult because of Joan's marriage to Reg and his situations with Del Boy and the police. In "The Frog and the Pussycat", Robdal and Kelly are again arrested on suspicion of murdering the sole eyewitness to the Margate robbery, although Robdal discovers it was a fraud by the police. However, Robdal is incarcerated when it is revealed one of the stolen jewels was pawned by Joan in order to fund Del's film, and at this time she is also "working" as Robdal's charlady (though they use most of their time to have sex). While in prison, Robdal implores Joan to leave London with him to his seaside home with Rodney. Joan accepts but only once she is certain of Del's financial state. However, Del's planned film does not work out well, and Joan is forced to stay in Peckham. It is implied that Robdal remains in Peckham as well.

=== George Trotter ===
George Trotter was the older brother of Grandad and Albert, and Del's great-uncle and godfather. He is mentioned in passing several times throughout the show, but is never seen. He presumably died sometime before the original series.

During Grandad's monologue about the First World War, it is mentioned that George tried to get out of service by claiming he was 14 despite him being 18, but he was caught due to his moustache and was conscripted. He was present at the Battle of Passchendaele, and according to Del, claimed he had had a bayonet duel with Hitler at the Somme. As mentioned in Rock & Chips by Grandad, in the 1920s he was sent to Calcutta to "try and calm things down". Mistaken for a diplomat by Del's Indian fiancée, Amita, he was actually a sniper.

His wife was Patsy (who Del referred to in his autobiography as Great-Aunt Pat), and presumably his daughter was Del's cousin Gillian (mentioned by Albert in "Strained Relations"). It is also mentioned in this episode that George and Albert had spun a coin to decide who would be Del's godfather.

== Guest and spin-off characters ==
=== Tony Angelino ===
Tony Angelino (Philip Pope) appeared in the episode "Stage Fright'". By day, he works as a dustman, but by night he is a popular nightclub singer at the Down by the Riverside Club, styling himself after Tom Jones.

When Del Boy is approached by local gangster Eugene McCarthy (Roger Blake) to find a singing act for his mother's 82nd birthday at his own club, the Starlight Rooms, he decides that Raquel and a male partner would make the perfect double act. After acting on a tip from Trigger, he and Rodney visit the Down by the Riverside Club and see Tony performing. Del is impressed and signs himself up as Tony's manager, ignoring Tony's warning that he can only sing certain songs.

On the night of the performance, Tony and Raquel are required to perform "Crying", at which point it is revealed that Tony could only sing certain songs due to his rhoticism, meaning that "crying" sounds like "cwying". Del flees from the club without speaking to Eugene, leaving Tony and Raquel to continue with their musical numbers – Please Release Me, Congratulations and The Green Green Grass of Home.

Tony follows Raquel home and demands his money, despite Del claiming that Tony defrauded him by not revealing his rhoticism. However, Eugene calls Del with the news that his mother found the act hilarious, and subsequently offers Tony and Raquel a five-week contract at his club.

=== Arnie ===
Arnie (Philip McGough) appears in the episode "Chain Gang". A conman, Arnie sells Del Boy, Boycie, Mike, Trigger, Uncle Albert and Rodney a batch of 24 carat gold chains for £12,500, only to double cross them later by faking a heart attack in a restaurant and makes off with both the chains and the money in an ambulance driven by his sons. The group eventually track him down while he is performing the same scam on Denzil, and drive Arnie away in an ambulance of their own.

=== Solly Attwell ===
Solly Attwell (Colin Jeavons) appeared in the episode "Hole in One". The Trotter family solicitor, believed to have represented Del on other, unspecified, occasions. Solly represented Uncle Albert in his case against the brewery when he fell down the Nag's Head cellar. Solly was described by Rodney as being "more bent than the villains", or according to Del, "an expert". He faced being "disbarred" when it was revealed that Albert had been lying to obtain compensation.

=== The Driscoll Brothers ===
Danny and Tony Driscoll (Roy Marsden and Christopher Ryan), usually known as the Driscoll brothers, appeared in only one episode, "Little Problems", but were mentioned in numerous others. The Driscoll brothers were the local gangsters with a fearsome reputation for violence (although in order to avoid serious problems with the police, they followed a strict rule in never harming the victim's head). They beat up Del Boy after he failed to repay money owed to them, and in the same episode left Mickey Pearce and Jevon with broken bones for a similar reason. In a similar joke to the different-looking Del and Rodney being brothers, the Driscoll brothers also differ in height, but by a good 18 inches (460 mm), though in their case the taller brother has the brains. The pair appear to have a love/hate relationship, as they often argue but continually work together to get what they want.

In the spin-off series The Green Green Grass, it is revealed that the Driscoll brothers have finally been found guilty and sent to prison, thanks to Boycie grassing them to the police, but have been paroled and are now after his blood.

The role of Danny Driscoll was originally written for series fan Anthony Hopkins but he was unable to appear due to the filming of The Silence of the Lambs. Hopkins subsequently recommended his friend Roy Marsden for the role.

=== Janice ===
Janice (Gaynor Ward) appears in the episode "A Slow Bus to Chingford" and is one of Rodney's girlfriends. Whilst Rodney is discussing art, Janice tells him her brother paints for the council. They then get intimate, but Del Boy enters and ruins it. Her last appearance is shortly after this, when Del Boy plays on snide joke on Rodney by telling him his whip and other implements have been washed by Grandad. Astonished and worried, she quietly sneaks out, not giving Rodney enough time tell her that Del is joking, causing Rodney to shout "You rotten git, Del!" for ruining his evening. Del later reveals that he is taking Janice out, but "for Rodney's sake" in order to keep Rodney from getting mad at him. Janice has a Corgi called Nero, which Del gets Rodney to help him patrol the bus garage as a Nocturnal Security Officer, telling Rodney that Nero is an "ex-police dog", the morning after Rodney tells Del that he was up all night taking Nero for walks and that Nero ran away scared when he saw a cat.

=== Gerald "Jelly" Kelly ===
Gerald "Jelly" Kelly (Paul Putner) is first mentioned in "The Frog's Legacy" and later introduced in Rock & Chips, as Freddie Robdal's partner-in-crime and best friend. He accompanies Robdal to Peckham following Robdal's release from prison, but as they are almost out of money, they plan a jewellery robbery while in Margate on a "Jolly Boys' Outing" with Del Boy and his family and friends and pull it off while the others are elsewhere. Kelly, however, does not approve of Robdal's relationship with Joan Trotter, whom he refers to as "that slag from the cinema", as both Robdal and Kelly display dislike for the abusive, workshy Reg. In "Five Gold Rings", it is shown that Robdal and Kelly were arrested and imprisoned again for the jewellery robbery, but while they both make bail, Kelly appears in only the episode's opening scene. In "The Frog and the Pussycat", Robdal and Kelly are temporarily exonerated but later suspected again following the disappearance of their robbery's sole eyewitness, although Robdal exposes the police's fraud. Though Robdal eventually goes to prison on an alternate charge (to protect Joan, who pawned the ring Robdal gave her in order to buy a Lambretta for Del), Kelly does not, and shares a drink with Robdal once he is freed. In the final scene, he and Robdal rob an art gallery together.

In 1963, Freddie and Kelly broke into a post office in Plumstead. Unfortunately, while Kelly set the explosives and was holding the nitroglycerine, Freddie sat on the detonator and the two men were both killed in the ensuing explosion. In "The Frog's Legacy'", Rodney sarcastically quips that had Kelly survived, he "wouldn't be any good in a Mexican Wave".

=== Abdul Khan ===
Abdul Khan (Tony Anholt) appeared in only one episode, "To Hull and Back", in which he and Boycie arranged a deal with Del, in order to smuggle diamonds from Amsterdam. Although this was the only episode in which he appeared, Abdul was also mentioned in '"Diamonds Are for Heather", when Del tells Heather where he got the engagement ring; "Video Nasty'", when Del had struck a deal with Abdul's cousin's girlfriend's brother's friend; and in the second Rock & Chips episode, "Five Gold Rings", when Del tells his friends that he got four glass diamond rings from Abdul's father, who owns the Bermondsey Wholesale Jewellery Emporium.

=== Lennox Gilbey ===
Lennox Gilbey (Vas Blackwood), appears in the episode "The Longest Night", in which he steals several items from a supermarket and is detained by the head of security, Tom Clark (John Bardon), and taken to the office of the manager, Mr. Peterson (Max Harvey), where Del, Rodney and Albert are also being held on false accusations of shoplifting. Lennox pulls a gun and demands access to the safe which is meant to have £60,000 but which is also shut by a time lock that will not open until the next morning, which results in Lennox locking himself and everyone in the office until the following day, mainly because his mother bought him a faulty watch from Del recently. During the night, he boasts that he is a wanted criminal known as the "Shadow", but the next morning he reveals his real name to Del after recognising him as the man who used to sell his mother shoes and who knew Del as a little boy. Lennox reveals his hard upbringing to Del and admits that he is not a known criminal and is actually committing the robbery with Peterson and Clark to resolve their financial issues. Del convinces Lennox to give the plan up before he is arrested and agrees to stay quiet as long as Peterson employs Lennox as a security guard and pays them £1000 compensation.

=== Lady Victoria Marsham-Hales ===
Lady Victoria "Vicky" Marsham-Hales (Sarah Duncan) is a brief girlfriend of Rodney's in the 1986 Christmas Special, "A Royal Flush". The only daughter of a wealthy and prominent duke, Rodney meets her in the market one day whilst she is unsuccessfully trying to sell her artwork. They become close friends and eventually date. Del Boy is immediately interested in Vicky's wealth and breeding and sees Rodney's relationship as a way of making them both millionaires, and despite Rodney's firm protests, repeatedly meddles in the relationship with disastrous results. He finally destroys all chances of Rodney and Vicky being together after inviting himself to dinner at the home of Vicky's father, and getting drunk and obnoxious, insulting the guests and humiliating Rodney. The furious duke throws the Trotters out of his home, and Rodney and Vicky sadly realise that it would be better not to see each other anymore. Unbeknownst to Rodney, Del earlier had told the duke to bribe Rodney with £1,000 to get out of Vicky's life, but a pained Rodney turned it down, angering Del.

=== Robbie Meadows ===
Dr Robbie Meadows (Ewan Stewart) appears once in the episode "Sickness and Wealth" as Del's former GP. When Del goes to visit the doctor due to severe stomach cramps, he discovers that Dr Meadows has left general practice and now works at the local hospital. Del tells his new GP several lies about his lifestyle, claiming that he is a celibate, teetotal, non-smoking, vegetarian "health freak". The GP, unable to ascertain why Del is experiencing such difficulties, sends him to hospital. While Del is worrying about what is wrong with him (fearing he might have AIDS), Dr Meadows approaches Del, explaining he was put in charge of Del's case. Knowing Del well, and that he was not the health-conscious man he made himself out to be to the other doctors, Dr Meadows diagnoses Del's illness as IBS.

=== Jumbo Mills ===
Jumbo Mills (Nick Stringer in "Who Wants to Be a Millionaire" and Lee Long in Rock & Chips) was Del's old school friend and business partner (they ran a jellied eels stall together) who emigrated to Australia during the 1960s. Jumbo, named for his love of elephants, returned to Peckham in the episode "Who Wants to Be a Millionaire'", and offered Del the chance to restore their old partnership by helping him run his new used car business back in Australia, only for Del to refuse the offer due to Rodney being unable to go because of his drug conviction.

Stringer also appeared in an earlier episode, "Go West Young Man", playing an Australian man who bought a car with faulty brakes from Del Boy. He later accidentally crashed into the back of an E-type Jaguar being driven by Del, who was looking after it for Boycie.

=== Vincenzo Occhetti ===
Vincenzo Occhetti (David Jason) appeared as the main antagonist in the two-part episode "Miami Twice'". Occhetti was a Mafia don and an exact doppelgänger for Del Boy. As the episode unfolded it emerged that Occhetti was under FBI surveillance and facing trial for murder, kidnapping and drug-running. After seeing Del's resemblance to his father, Occhetti's son Rico launched a series of unsuccessful attempts to assassinate Del, hoping that the authorities would believe Occhetti himself was dead and thus spare him the prison sentence. Every attempt failed, and Del and Rodney eventually uncovered the Mafia plan, providing the FBI with crucial evidence to send Occhetti to prison for life.

=== Elsie Partridge ===
Elsie Partridge (Constance Chapman) was Uncle Albert's girlfriend. Although mentioned frequently, she appears in "Sickness and Wealth" only.

Elsie was a widow with eleven children and lived on the same estate as the Trotters. She and Albert met at a bingo game and struck up a romantic relationship, but never married as Albert was still legally married to his estranged wife Ada. Albert often downplayed the nature of their relationship to Del and Rodney, but they saw through this and often brought Elsie's name up to silence or embarrass him in conversation. Despite his relationship with Elsie, Albert and his friend Knock-Knock had a fight over Marlene's mother, Dora Lane, in "He Ain't Heavy, He's My Uncle".

At Albert's insistence, Elsie holds a séance in a private room at The Nag's Head in "Sickness and Wealth". Despite voicing their suspicions about her psychic ability, Del and Rodney attend the seance alongside Boycie and Trigger, where Elsie manages to summon the spirits of Boycie's father and Joan Trotter, the latter of whom demanded that Del get his stomach pains examined at hospital, after Del (who had a fear of doctors) kept avoiding medical intervention. However, it was later revealed that Albert had asked Elsie to pretend that she had summoned Joan's spirit, as she was the only person Del would listen to.

By the time of Albert's death in "If They Could See Us Now", he and Elsie had been living together with Elsie's family in Weston-super-Mare for several years. Del and Rodney, accompanied by Raquel, Cassandra and Damien, travel to attend his funeral but accidentally attend the wake of Albert "Bunny" Warren, at a house just up the road from Albert's wake, attended by several Peckham residents.

Elsie had died by the time of "Strangers on the Shore'".

=== Miss Tibbs and Miss Gatsby ===
Abatha Tibbs (Gilly Flower) and Ursula Gatsby (Renee Roberts) are two elderly women that appear in "Homesick", individually purchasing items from Del and Rodney.

The characters originated from BBC sitcom Fawlty Towers, which concluded four years before "Homesick" was aired in 1983. Although not named and credited as "Old Ladies", the BBC's own Radio Times publication credits them as their Fawlty Towers characters, hinting that Only Fools and Horses and Fawlty Towers are set in the same continuity.

=== Reenie Turpin ===
Reenie Turpin (Joan Sims in "The Frog's Legacy" and Emma Cook in Rock & Chips) appeared in only '"The Frog's Legacy" but is mentioned in "Chain Gang". She is Trigger's aunt and Joan Trotter's best friend. She informs Del of the gold legacy that Freddie the Frog left to his mother. She also sparks a debate over who Rodney's real father was after stating to Albert that "Joanie was never 100% sure".

In Rock & Chips, Reenie works alongside Joan as an usherette at the local film house. Like Joan and Del, Reenie loathes Reg Trotter and is unafraid to stand up to him, threatening to reveal that Reg is often violent toward his wife. However, the prequel makes no mention of her relationship with Trigger, and she appears to be a mere family friend. She helps Joan determine her pregnancy in an anonymous clinic following her affair with Freddie Robdal, and even submits her name for Joan to use while visiting Freddie in prison.

In Del's autobiography, He Who Dares, it is explained that Reenie's brother Donald is Trigger's father.

== Unseen characters ==
=== Albie Littlewood ===
Albie Littlewood is an unseen character, mentioned in "Happy Returns". He was Del's best friend but had an affair with Del's then-fiancée June Snell, something Del only found out years later. However, at the same time Del was having an affair with Albie's girlfriend Deidre. Albie is the father of June's daughter Debbie, whom Rodney had dated. While en route to see June one night, Albie took a shortcut across a railway line and was killed when he fell onto the live rail (the railways in Peckham are electrified using third rails rather than overhead wires).

Albie also appears in the 2010 prequel drama Rock & Chips, played by Jonathan Readwin. In the prequel, he is shown to be secretly taking drugs to lighten his mood at certain times, and notably, Albie and Jumbo Mills trick Roy Slater into taking some and later dancing in a bar until he collapses from exhaustion.

=== Monkey Harris, Sunglasses Ron & Paddy the Greek ===
Kenneth "Monkey" Harris, Sunglasses Ron and Paddy the Greek are Del Boy's friends who are in the same "business" as him. Although they are mentioned regularly, they are never seen on screen. They are often involved in Del's trading deals (although separately), usually sourcing Del's hooky gear, and are often described and mentioned in discussions among other characters in The Nag's Head.

Despite being unseen characters, significant detail about their background (particularly Monkey Harris) is revealed. For instance, it is known that Monkey Harris lives in a bungalow, as mentioned in the episode "No Greater Love". As such, the characters often play a minor role in plot development, usually as a device of comic resolution. According to "The Class of '62", Monkey Harris was also a schoolfriend of Del, Boycie, Denzil, Trigger and Roy Slater, and they played in the school football team together.

It is possible that Sunglasses Ron is the man sitting at the back of the bus in "The Jolly Boys' Outing".
