= Peter Woodthorpe =

English actor (1931–2004)

- Born: 25 September 1931; York, England
- Died: 13 August 2004 (aged 72); Banbury, Oxfordshire, England
- Occupation: Actor
- Years active: 1956–2004
- Notable work: Playing Del's father in Only Fools and Horses (1983)

Peter Woodthorpe (25 September 1931 – 13 August 2004) was an English actor who supplied the voice of Gollum in the 1978 Bakshi version of The Lord of the Rings and the BBC's 1981 radio serial. He also provided the voice of Pigsy in the cult series Monkey and played Max, the pathologist, in early episodes of Inspector Morse.

== Early life ==
Born in York, Woodthorpe was educated at Archbishop Holgate's Grammar School. He was a national serviceman in the Royal Navy as part of naval intelligence.

== Career ==
In 1955, Woodthorpe portrayed Estragon in the first British production of Waiting for Godot. He had then just finished his second year reading Biochemistry at Magdalene College, Cambridge, and expected to return after a run of a few weeks. When the play was successful, faced with the choice of dropping out either from Cambridge or from the play, he chose to stay with the play and his acting career. In 1960, he played Aston in the first production of Harold Pinter's The Caretaker at the Arts Theatre, in London, prior to transferring to the West End's Duchess Theatre on 30 May 1960. He also starred as Oxford in the Broadway musical Darling of the Day. He was later a member of the Royal Shakespeare Company, appearing in productions of Much Ado About Nothing, Henry V, The Merchant of Venice and The Lower Depths.

In 1964 and 1965, he made three films for cinematographer-turned-director Freddie Francis: The Evil of Frankenstein (1964), Hysteria (1965) and The Skull (1965), the first two for Hammer Films and the last for Amicus Productions. His characters in these films were all sleazy, corrupt and manipulative types (a hypnotist, a nudie photographer and a corrupt landlord).

Other television appearances include as the writer Honoré de Balzac in the BBC series Notorious Woman (1974) and as the corrupt Councillor George Webb in the episode "Not a Very Civil Civil Servant" of London Weekend Television's action drama The Professionals (1978).

One of Woodthorpe's best-remembered roles was the guest role of Reg Trotter, father of Del Boy, in the 1983 Christmas special Thicker than Water, an episode of the BBC sitcom Only Fools and Horses. In 1984, he and Lennard Pearce (who starred on the programme as Grandad Trotter, Reg's father, and appeared alongside him in that episode) were seen together again in the Minder episode "The Balance of Power".

After 1994, he recorded the voices of Toad, Great White Stag and Whistler in a BBC Young Collection audiotape version of the Animals of Farthing Wood.

== Death ==
Woodthorpe died at the age of 72 on 13 August 2004 in Banbury, Oxfordshire, following a short illness.

== Partial filmography ==
- Father Came Too! (1963) – Farmer
- The Evil of Frankenstein (1964) – Zoltan
- Hysteria (1965) – Marcus Allan
- The Skull (1965) – Travers
- The Blue Max (1966) – Corporal Rupp
- The Charge of the Light Brigade (1968) – Cardigan's Valet
- The Lord of the Rings (1978) – Gollum / Smeagol (voice)
- The Mirror Crack'd (1980) – Scout Master
- Only Fools and Horses (1983) - Reg Trotter
- To Catch a King (1984) – Elric Becker
- A Christmas Carol (1984) – Old Joe
- Minder (1984) - Lent
- Eleni (1985) – Grandfather
- Inspector Morse (1987–1988, TV Series) – Dr. Max DeBryn
- Testimony (1988) – Alexander Glazunov
- Massacre Play (1989) – Straccalino
- Red Hot (1993) – Professor Lusis
- The Madness of King George (1994) – Clergyman
- The Animals of Farthing Wood (1994) Toad, The Great White Stag, Whistler (Audiotape only)
- England, My England (1995) – Kiffen
- Jane Eyre (1996) – Briggs
- The Odyssey (1997) – Mentor
- Merlin (1998) – Soothsayer
- The Strange Case of Delphina Potocka or The Mystery of Chopin (1999) – 3rd Official
