= Frankie Fryer =

Frankie Fryer (also spelled as Franky Fryer) is a fictional character on the British Sky Sports association football television programme, Soccer AM. He is played by Adam Smith.

== Design ==
The character is designed as an imitation of London born actor, Danny Dyer. The character speaks with a cockney accent and uses cockney rhyming slang. The character also wears a wig, brown jacket and jewellery.

Fryer hosts Soccer AM's "Away Days" segment, where the character visits various football locations in the United Kingdom and abroad and gives an overview of attractions in the city where Away Days is being filmed. The character's usage in the segment was viewed by Swansea's cabinet member for regeneration, Nick Bradley as a way to encourage visiting football fans to spend the night in the city after football matches after Away Days was filmed to cover Swansea City.

The character is also used on t-shirts which were sold by Soccer AM during the 2012–13 football season for charity. The shirt's design includes the slogan, "Franky says: Keep Me Nut Daan".

== Reception ==
Thom Gibbs in the Daily Telegraph called the character "an offensively weak impression of Danny Dyer with a side order of Del Boy’s French malapropisms." In October 2012, Reggae band, Wilcko released a single about the character entitled "Oy, Oy, Oy, It's Franky Fryer!" The single reached a peak of 3rd on the iTunes UK charts.
