= Uncle Albert (disambiguation) =

Uncle Albert is the fictional character in the Only Fools and Horses television series.

Uncle Albert may also refer to:

- "Uncle Albert/Admiral Halsey", 1971 song by Paul and Linda McCartney on the Ram album
- Albert Tatlock, fictional character on the Coronation Street television series, known in his later years as Uncle Albert
- Uncle Albert, fictional character in the Car Wars game
- Uncle Albert, fictional character in Mary Poppins (book series) and adaptions
- Uncle Albert, fictional allegory of Albert Einstein in a series of children's novels by Russell Stannard
- 'Uncle Albert', nickname given to military man Albert Kesselring
