= Kellie Bright =

English actress (born 1976)

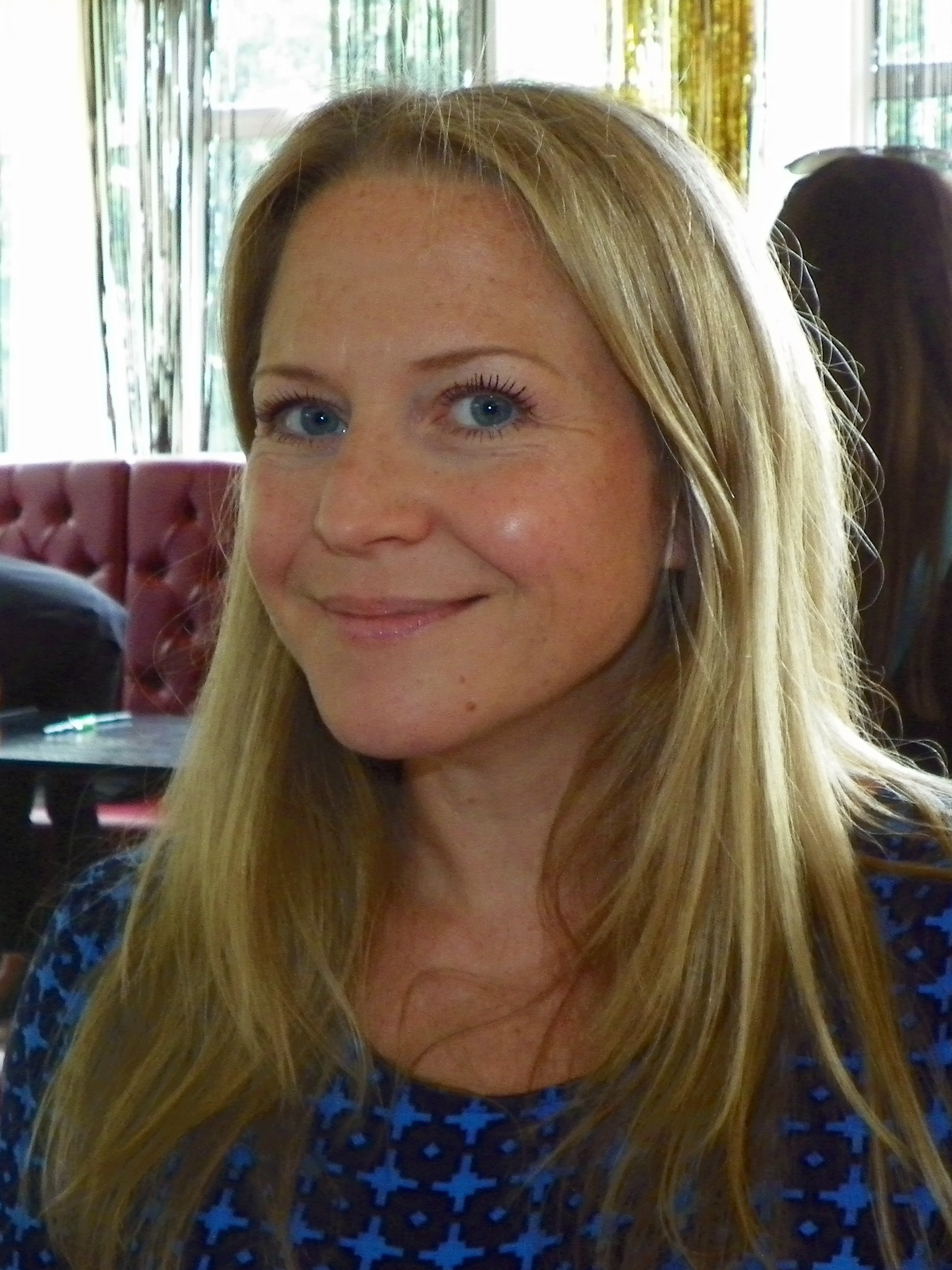
- Bright in 2016
- Born: Kellie Denise Bright; 1 July 1976 (age 50); Brentwood, Essex, England
- Education: Sylvia Young Theatre School
- Occupation: Actress
- Years active: 1986–present
- Notable work: EastEnders; Ali G Indahouse; The Upper Hand; Bad Girls; Rock & Chips; Strictly Come Dancing; T-Bag
- Spouse: Paul Stocker (m. 2014)
- Children: 3

Kellie Denise Bright (born 1 July 1976) is an English actress. Her roles include Linda Carter in the BBC soap opera EastEnders (2013–2026), for which she won the 2015 British Soap Award for Best Actress and Best Dramatic Performance, Julie in Ali G Indahouse, Joanna Burrows in The Upper Hand (1990–1996), Cassie Tyler in Bad Girls (2002) and Joan Trotter in Rock & Chips (2010–2011). In 2015, she was the runner-up in the 13th series of the BBC One show Strictly Come Dancing.

== Career ==
=== Early career ===
Bright has been acting since she was 11, appearing on stage in shows such as Annie and Les Misérables, before landing a place at the Sylvia Young Theatre School where she became friends with Emma Bunton and Keeley Hawes. As a child actress, she appeared in several different series on British television in the late 1980s and the 1990s, including T-Bag and Maid Marian and Her Merry Men. In 1990, at the age of 13, Bright was cast as Joanna Burrows in TV series The Upper Hand alongside William Puttock, Joe McGann, Diana Weston and Honor Blackman which ran for six years.

After The Upper Hand had finished, Bright has said that she struggled to make ends meet. She says, "I didn't have any acting work, so I got a job waiting on tables to pay the mortgage, but it was while The Upper Hand was still on air. Next thing I know, a customer had called a newspaper saying I was there and some photographers appeared out of the blue snapping away." She also worked as a receptionist at a nightclub in London. She continued, "I was getting rejected from one job after another and no matter how much I tried not to take it personally, a part of me couldn't help but think: 'I was too ugly to get that part'." Bright played Kate Madikane (née Aldridge) in Radio 4's The Archers, and was with the series from 1995 until 2004.

=== Mainstream success ===
Bright has also had main roles in Bad Girls and has also guest starred in Da Ali G Show and made an appearance in the film Ali G Indahouse. Bright has made several guest appearances on British television programmes, her credits include Holby City, Casualty, The Catherine Tate Show and Vera.

Bright appeared as Joan Trotter in the Only Fools and Horses prequel, Rock & Chips, from 2010 until 2011.

=== EastEnders ===
In October 2013, Bright was cast as Linda Carter in the BBC soap opera EastEnders. Linda made her first on screen appearance on 19 December 2013, but officially arrived on Albert Square with her husband, Mick (played by Danny Dyer) and her children on 26 December 2013. The Carter family were created by the show's executive producer Dominic Treadwell-Collins who planned to completely revamp the show. Since her arrival, Bright's character Linda has been a part of some of the show's biggest storylines such as struggling to accept that her son Johnny (Sam Strike) is gay. In October 2014, Linda was involved in a controversial storyline where she was raped by Dean Wicks (Matt Di Angelo). On filming this particular storyline, Bright stated that "It is a challenging storyline, but it is an important storyline and I feel honoured to have been given it". Bright was praised for her performance during this storyline. Bright won the 2014 Digital Spy's Readers Award for Best Female Soap Actress. Along with Dyer, Bright was nominated for "Best On-screen Partnership" at The British Soap Awards 2014 for the relationship between Mick and Linda. In 2015, she was nominated for the "Serial Drama Performance" award at the National Television Awards, however the award was won by Dyer. She has been nominated for Best Actress and Best Dramatic Performance at The British Soap Awards 2015; Bright won both. On 12 March 2015, Bright revealed that she had received "personal letters" from rape victims who had been affected by Linda's story, leaving her feeling "humbled" by the audience's response.

In August 2026, it was announced that Bright would be leaving the soap after 13 years. She said in a statement "EastEnders has been my home for thirteen years and I have absolutely loved being part of the show, but I have decided that it is now the right time for me to say goodbye. I made the tough decision over a year ago, and after discussing this with [the executive producers], they asked me to stay on to be part of an exciting storyline they had planned, and I happily agreed to extend my stay. I will miss my friends and colleagues hugely, but I am looking forward to my next chapter and spending more time with my wonderful boys."

=== Other ventures ===
In 1992, Bright voiced the character of Beauty in the Bevanfield Films production of Beauty and the Beast. She has also voiced several video game characters, including the Hero of Brightwall in the game Fable III in 2010. In 2011, Bright did voicework for Nintendo and Monolith Soft's Xenoblade Chronicles as the medic Sharla.

Bright took part in the BBC's Children in Need appeal in 2014 along with Danny Dyer and the rest of the EastEnders cast who performed a Grease medley titled "Grease Enders". Bright appears as Linda though dressed up as Sandy Olsen. She performed in "You're the One That I Want" and ""We Go Together" (Grease song)".

In September 2015, Bright joined the thirteenth series of Strictly Come Dancing on BBC One. Bright chose to continue playing Linda Carter on EastEnders while competing on Strictly Come Dancing, working all day at EastEnders and rehearsing for Strictly in the evening. Paired with professional dancer Kevin Clifton, she was described by head judge Len Goodman as a "great all round dancer". On 19 December the pair reached the final three and topped the leaderboard with a score of 119. Their score including two maximum scores of 40 for their tango to "You Really Got Me" by The Kinks and their showdance to "The Ding-Dong Daddy of the D-Car Line" by Cherry Poppin' Daddies. Their final dance, a Charleston to "Cantina Band" from Star Wars, scored 39, but the public voted Jay McGuiness and Aliona Vilani as the competition winners.

Week #	Dance / Song	Judges' scores				Total	Result
Week #	Dance / Song	Craig Revel Horwood	Darcey Bussell	Len Goodman	Bruno Tonioli	Total	Result
1	Tango / "You Really Got Me"	6	7	7	7	27	None
2	Cha-Cha-Cha / "Don't Go Breaking My Heart"	6	7	7	7	27	Safe
3	Charleston / "Cantina Band"	8	8	8	8	32	Safe
4	Foxtrot / "Dream a little dream of me"	8	8	8	8	32	Safe
5	Jive / "One Way or Another"	8	9	9	9	35	Safe
6	Paso Doble / "School's Out"	7	7	7	7	28	Safe
7	Waltz / "Love Ain't Here Anymore"	8	8	8	8	32	Bottom two
8	Samba / "Boom! Shake the Room"	9	8	7	9	33	Safe
9	Quickstep / "9 to 5"	9	9	9	10	37	Safe
10	Salsa / "I Want You Back"	8	8	9	9	34	Bottom two
10	Quickstep-a-thon / Sing, Sing, Sing	Judges Awarded 2 Points				36	Bottom two
11	Viennese Waltz / "Oom-Pah-Pah"	9	9	9	9	36	Safe
12	Rumba / "Songbird"	9	8	9	8	34	Safe
12	American Smooth / "Let's Face the Music and Dance"	9	10	10	10	39	Safe
Final	Tango / "You Really Got Me"	10	10	10	10	40	Runner-up
Final	Showdance / "The Ding-Dong Daddy of the D-Car Line"	10	10	10	10	40	Runner-up
Final	Charleston / "Cantina Band"	9	10	10	10	39	Runner-up

== Personal life ==
In December 2011, Bright gave birth to her first son. Bright married her long-term partner and father of her children, Paul Stocker, in Trelill, Cornwall on 5 July 2014. She gave birth to her second son on 21 November 2016. Her second son was conceived through IVF, and following his birth, the couple froze three embryos. Following two failed attempts at conceiving in 2020, Bright announced in March 2021 that she was pregnant with the couple's third son, who was born later that year on 22 July.

== Filmography ==
=== Film ===
Year	Title	Role	Notes
2002	Ali G Indahouse	"Me Julie"	Main role
2003	How (Not) to Make a Short Film	Stefania	Short film
2005	Imagine Me and You	Terri	
2005	Kinky Boots	Jeannie	
2012	Ashes	Lisa	

=== Television ===
Year	Title	Role	Notes
1986	EastEnders	Bridesmaid	1 episode; uncredited
1989	T-Bag and the Revenge of the T-Set	Sally Simpkins/Anastasia	10 episodes
1989	The Bill	Mr. Carmody's daughter	Uncredited
1989	Maid Marian and Her Merry Men	Little girl	Main cast
1989	T-Bag's Christmas Carol	Sally Simpkins	Television film
1990	T-Bag and the Pearls of Wisdom	Sally Simpkins	10 episodes
1990	Brush Strokes	Child	
1990–1996	The Upper Hand	Joanna Burrows	Series 1–7 (main cast, all 94 episodes)
1991	The Grove Family	Daphne Grove	One-off re-make to celebrate closure of Lime Grove Studios
1991	Family Fortunes	Herself	Participant
1992	Beauty and the Beast	Beauty	
1996	Scenes	Clare	Episode: Alison
1997	Blackrock	Leesha	
1998	The Bill	Lianne Clark	1 episode
2000	Nature Boy	Katy	1 episode
2000	Cor, Blimey!	Viola	Television film
2000	The Thing About Vince...	Sally	
2001	Outriders	Julia's Mother	2 episodes
2002	Bad Girls	Cassie Tyler	Series 4 (main cast, 12 episodes)
2002	The House That Jack Built	Lisa Squire	6 episodes
2002	Silent Witness	DC Mona Westlake	
2005	Jericho	WPC Penny Collins	
2005	The Alice	Lynette	1 episode
2006	Vital Signs	Yvonne	1 episode
2006	Two Women	Woman	1 episode
2007	The Catherine Tate Show	Kelly	Christmas Special
2008	New Tricks	Sarah Madeley	1 episode
2008	Horne & Corden	Various roles	5 episodes
2009	Hotel Babylon	Meredith Sutton	1 episode
2009	Holby City	Joy Miller	2 episodes
2010	Come Rain, Come Shine	Joanne Mitchell	Television film
2010–2011	Rock & Chips	Joan Trotter	Main cast
2012	One Night	Dawn	2 episodes
2013	Great Night Out	Shona	1 episode
2013	Casualty	Tina Caffola	1 episode
2013	Pointless Celebrities	Herself	Participant
2013–2027	EastEnders	Linda Carter	Series regular
2014	Vera	Vanessa Barnes	1 episode
2014	Children in Need 2014	Linda Carter	Grease Enders – EastEnders cast do Grease
2015	Strictly Come Dancing	Herself	Participant
2015	Strictly – It Takes Two	Herself	Weekly guest
2016	All Star Mr & Mrs	Herself	Participant
2016	EastEnders: Back to Ours	Herself	1 episode
2020	The Queen Vic Quiz Night	Linda Carter	Spinoff appearance
2020	EastEnders: Secrets from the Square	Herself	2 episodes
2023	EastEnders: The Six	Herself	2 episodes
2024	Tracey: A Day in the Life	Linda Carter	1 episode
2025	Kellie Bright – Autism, School and Families on the Edge	Herself	Panorama documentary

=== Radio ===
Year	Title	Role	Notes
1995–2004	The Archers	Kate Madikane	Main role

=== Video games ===
Year	Title	Role	Notes
2010	Fable III	Hero of Brightwall – Female / Elise	
2011	Dragon Age II	Grace/Idunna/Guardsman Brennan/Ella/Ginnis	
2011	Xenoblade Chronicles	Sharla	English dub
2020	Xenoblade Chronicles: Definitive Edition	Sharla	English dub, Archival audio
2026	Xenoblade Chronicles: Definitive Edition - Nintendo Switch 2 Edition	Sharla	English dub, Archival audio and newly recorded Heart-to-Hearts.

=== Web ===
Year	Title	Role	Notes
2014	On Set With...Kellie Bright	Herself	EastEnders web series
2015	Ramsay Square	Linda Carter	Neighbours 30th Birthday Tribute
2016	EastEnders: Back To Ours	Herself	Web series

== Theatre ==
Year	Title	Role	Notes
1993–1994	Snow White and the Seven Dwarfs	Snow White	Central Theatre, Chatham
1994–1995	Beauty and the Beast	The Princess	Hayes Beck Theatre
1995–1996	Beauty and the Beast	The Princess	The Civic, Barnsley
1996	The Taming of the Shrew	Bianca	Eye Theatre, Suffolk
1998–1999	Peter Pan	Wendy	New Victoria Theatre, Woking
2000	Snake in Fridge	Caddie	Royal Exchange, Manchester
2003	The Seagull	Masha	Royal Exchange, Manchester
2003	Cold Meat Party	Amanda	Royal Exchange, Manchester
2006	Mary Barton	Mary Barton	Royal Exchange, Manchester
2007	Whipping it Up	Maggie	UK Tour

== Awards and nominations ==
Award	Year	Category	Work	Result	Ref.
The British Soap Awards	2014	Best On-Screen Partnership (with Danny Dyer)	EastEnders	Nominated	
The British Soap Awards	2015	Best Actress	EastEnders	Won	
The British Soap Awards	2015	Best Dramatic Performance	EastEnders	Won	
The British Soap Awards	2016	Best On-Screen Partnership (with Danny Dyer)	EastEnders	Nominated	
The British Soap Awards	2025	Best Leading Performer	EastEnders	Nominated	
Inside Soap Awards	2015	Best Actress	EastEnders	Nominated	
Inside Soap Awards	2018	Best Partnership (with Danny Dyer)	EastEnders	Won	
Inside Soap Awards	2019	Best Partnership (with Danny Dyer)	EastEnders	Nominated	
Inside Soap Awards	2020	Best Partnership (with Danny Dyer)	EastEnders	Won	
National Television Awards	2015	Serial Drama Performance	EastEnders	Nominated	
TRIC Awards	2019	Soap Actor	EastEnders	Nominated	
TRIC Awards	2020	Soap Actor	EastEnders	Won	
TV Choice Awards	2015	Best Soap Actress	EastEnders	Nominated	
TV Choice Awards	2020	Best Soap Actress	EastEnders	Nominated	
TV Choice Awards	2021	Best Soap Actress	EastEnders	Nominated	
TV Choice Awards	2022	Best Soap Actress	EastEnders	Nominated	
TVTimes Awards	2014	Favourite Soap Star	EastEnders	Nominated	
TVTimes Awards	2015	Favourite Soap Star	EastEnders	Nominated	
TVTimes Awards	2020	Favourite Soap Star	EastEnders	3rd place	
TVTimes Awards	2024	Favourite Soap Actor	EastEnders	Nominated	
