= Rodney Trotter =

Fictional character from Only Fools and Horses

- Only Fools and Horses character
- First appearance: 'Big Brother' (1981)
- Last appearance: 'Beckham in Peckham' (2014)
- Created by: John Sullivan
- Portrayed by: Nicholas Lyndhurst

In-universe information
- Family: Freddie Robdal (father); Joan Trotter (mother); Reg Trotter (adoptive father); Derek Trotter (half-brother)
- Spouse: Cassandra Parry (m. 1989)
- Children: Joan Trotter Jr
- Relatives: Ted Trotter (adoptive grandfather); Vi Trotter (adoptive grandmother); Albert Trotter (adoptive great-uncle); Damien Trotter (nephew)
- Home: Peckham

Rodney Charlton Trotter (also known as Dave by Trigger) is a fictional character in the long running BBC sitcom Only Fools and Horses, played by Nicholas Lyndhurst.

== Biography ==
Rodney Charlton Trotter was born on 2 November 1960 to Joan Mavis Trotter (née Hollins) and Freddie "the Frog" Robdal; however, his presumed father is Reg Trotter. Rodney is the grandson of Edward Trotter, and great-nephew of Albert Trotter.

In "Little Problems", it is revealed that Rodney is named after "handsome actor" Rod Taylor and Charlton after Charlton Athletic, his mother's favourite football team – not Charlton Heston as Marlene had assumed.

Rodney is the younger brother of Derek Trotter, who affectionately refers to him as "Rodders". Rodney has supported Del with all his schemes, but is not as confident as his brother. Del's comments whenever Rodney makes a mistake, including "Plonker", "Wally", "Twonk", "Dipstick" and "Tart", became notable catchphrases throughout the series. It is revealed in numerous episodes, such as "Big Brother", "The Long Legs of the Law", and "A Royal Flush" that Rodney is appalled by Del's behaviour, including lying to girls they want to date.

Throughout the series, Rodney's presumed father was Reg Trotter, although his actual paternity was occasionally called into question, such as in the 1987 Christmas special "The Frog's Legacy", due to the unavoidable fact that he shared little resemblance to either Del or Reg in terms of appearance or personality. In the final Only Fools and Horses episode, the 2003 Christmas special "Sleepless in Peckham", Rodney discovered through an old photograph of the first Jolly Boys' Outing that he and Del did not actually share the same father. His biological father was revealed to be local gentleman thief, Freddie "the Frog" Robdal, who had an affair with Del and Rodney's mother Joan in March 1960, and Rodney instantly deduced this due to Robdal's striking resemblance to him. This is confirmed in the prequel series Rock & Chips. In the episode's final scene, Rodney asks Del if he is anything like Freddie Robdal, but Del denies it, labelling Robdal several derogatory terms such as "thief", "conman", "liar", "prick" and "cheat", none of which applies to Rodney.

=== Age ===
The BBC comedy guide for Only Fools and Horses clearly states that Rodney's birthday is 26 February; however, this is contradicted in "Sleepless in Peckham", when Cassandra mistakes Freddie the Frog in an old 1960s photo of the first Jolly Boys' Outing for Rodney. Rodney corrects her, claiming that the photo was taken in July 1960 before he was born (according to Rodney), thus making Rodney's date of birth the date he reveals it to be in "The Unlucky Winner Is...", 2 November. This is confirmed when Rodney's birth is shown in "Rock & Chips".

However, some episodes of Only Fools and Horses do not support this; in "Big Brother", from 1981, Rodney states to Del that he is 23 years of age, which would make his year of birth 1957 or 1958. In the same episode, Del Boy states that there is a thirteen-year age gap between himself and Rodney. "You couldn't be like any other little brother, could you, eh, and come along a couple of years later after me? Oh, no, no, not you. You had to wait thirteen years!" In the following episode, "Go West Young Man", which was broadcast in September 1981 (and was the second episode of Only Fools and Horses ever broadcast), Del Boy states that he (Del) is 35. In "Big Brother", since Rodney had said he was 23, Rodney must already have had his birthday that year with Del still to have his 36th birthday later that year. Therefore, Rodney must have been born during 1958. In "Healthy Competition", which was broadcast in November 1983, Rodney says that he is twenty-four years old. Therefore, the year of his birth is either 1958 or 1959. In "As One Door Closes", set in early 1985, Rodney tells Del that he is 24, making his year of birth 1960. In "Yuppy Love", Del states that the Trotter family have been living at Nelson Mandela House since 1962, and that Rodney was born in the flat. Similarly, Rodney and Cassandra's wedding certificate shows that they were married on 25 January 1989 and gives Rodney's age as 26 and Cassandra's as 21. This would make Rodney born in 1962 (assuming he hadn't yet had a birthday before his wedding in 1989) and during "Modern Men" (set around Christmas 1996), Mickey Pearce describes Rodney as a "34-year-old paperboy", which would also back up a birth year of 1962. However, during "Mother Nature's Son", set around Christmas 1992, Rodney states that he is 31, suggesting he was born in 1961.

=== Early life ===
Del claimed in "Mother Nature's Son" that Rodney was still being breastfed until he was three and a half years old. As a child, Rodney was "all snot and Marmite" with a "funny haircut". Unlike Del, Rodney went to grammar school, where he received GCEs in Art and Mathematics. Del often asks Rodney questions, saying: "You're the one with GCEs!". He was subsequently expelled from art college in Basingstoke after three weeks for smoking cannabis in a fellow student's room. He was fined £250 and given an eighteen-month suspended sentence for possession of a controlled drug.

=== Career ===
With only two GCEs and a criminal record, Del gave Rodney a job as an assistant market trader (or "financial advisor") and dogsbody, knowing that he was unlikely to get a decent job anywhere else due to his past mistakes. Rodney's main duty was checking for the police while Del would be illegally selling his merchandise in the market. In early episodes, Rodney was angered by this, and also by the fact that he had a menial job and lived in a shambolic flat.

Rodney took over from Del in 2001 when he was declared bankrupt, forbidding him from running a company. When Trotters Independent Traders was about to cease operating, Del knew that Rodney was not banned from managing a firm, and so, after two decades as an assistant market trader, Rodney finally got promoted to titular Managing Director, but this did not stop Del from trying to control the company.

For some time, Rodney worked as Financial Director of T.I.T.Co, a job that included such executive tasks as loading the van. Rodney has principles and is often disgusted by Del's business activities, such as dealing in stolen goods. Despite his moral objections, Rodney is usually persuaded into Del's money-making schemes by Del's smooth-talking manipulation and the possibility of financial rewards.

=== Marriage to Cassandra ===
Rodney found a kindred-spirit in Cassandra, whom he met at a computer training course in "Yuppy Love". He lied to her that he lived in the upmarket King's Avenue in order to impress her; however, she later found out where he lived when she rang Nelson Mandela House. When he met Cassandra, it gave him a chance to move on in life, which resulted in his leaving behind Del. They married in 1989 in the episode "Little Problems".

Cassandra's father, Alan, employed Rodney at his company, Parry Print Ltd. – at least until Rodney accidentally quit that job – and, with some financial assistance from Del, he was able to buy a flat and finally move out of Nelson Mandela House. Their marriage suffered when Rodney assaulted Cassandra's boss, breaking his nose, upon returning from Margate in "The Jolly Boys' Outing". They separated in the 1990 Christmas special "Rodney Come Home", and throughout the seventh series attempted to save their marriage; in "The Chance of a Lunchtime" Del played matchmaker, in order for them to re-unite. This worked, until Rodney was seen by Cassandra with one of Del's ex-fiancées, when he was accompanying her to a taxi because she was drunk. In "Three Men, a Woman and a Baby", Cassandra told Rodney that it was all over between them, until her mum insisted she should see their solicitor for advice, who told her that they should talk. He stayed the night, but they were interrupted by Del phoning to say Raquel had gone into labour.

In "Miami Twice", it was revealed that the two were living together on weekends as they tried to repair their relationship. In "Mother Nature's Son", they were fully reconciled. They had been trying for a baby ever since, so when it was announced in "Heroes and Villains" that Cassandra was pregnant, everyone was jubilant. However, she miscarried at the end of the following episode, "Modern Men". In the last episode, "Sleepless in Peckham", Cassandra gave birth to a girl, whom Rodney named Joan after his late mother.

As of 2003, Rodney lives with Cassandra; their daughter, Joan; Del; Del's "significant other", Raquel; and Del and Raquel's son, Damien at Flat 368 on the twelfth floor of the fictional Nelson Mandela House on the Nyerere Estate, Peckham, London, but Del's autobiography states that barely a month after receiving their fortune from Uncle Albert's will, Rodney and Cassandra had got their own flat.

=== Personality ===
Rodney's personality was based on the experiences of series creator John Sullivan, who also had an older brother and claimed to have been, like Rodney, a slacker and an idealist in his youth, but struggled with confidence and was supported by his sibling.

=== Catchphrases ===
The only running phrase Rodney uses is the word "cosmic" to describe something good or impressive, either in a sentence or exclamation form. More often than not, he uses this expression sarcastically, such as when being caught in a downpour without a raincoat that fits ("Yuppy Love"), or upon hearing a set of wardrobe doors acquired by Del were stolen ("As One Door Closes"). However, he frequently calls Del a "git" in the same way as Del would call him a "plonker", "wally" or "dipstick".

=== Dave ===
The name "Dave" is bestowed upon him by Trigger, the only character to refer to him as such, and was born from a one-line joke in the very first episode, "Big Brother". This became a long-running joke throughout the entire series.

No matter how many times Trigger was told Rodney's name, he continued to call him Dave. One instance was in "Three Men, a Woman and a Baby": Rodney tells Trigger that if Del and Raquel's baby is a boy, they will name it Rodney after him. Trigger then tells Mike, the landlord of The Nag's Head, who is holding a "guess the baby name" competition, that "If it's a boy, they're naming him Rodney, after Dave". Another instance is portrayed in "Modern Men", when Mike announced a toast to future mum and dad "Cassandra and Rodney"; everyone said "Cassandra and Rodney", but Trigger could be heard saying "Dave" after everyone else stops talking. In "Homesick", Rodney told Trigger to his face that his name was Rodney and not Dave. Trigger seemed to understand, but almost immediately started calling him Dave again, and also refers to him as this when Rodney is not around.

=== Personal life ===
In the episode "It's Only Rock and Roll", Rodney is a drummer in a band fronted by "Mental" Mickey Maguire. Despite their terrible musical abilities, Del convinces the band that by having him as their manager they will go on to become a big success. Having secured a booking at a local pub for St Patrick's Day celebrations, the night ends in disaster with a fight breaking out. Having convinced Rodney that the band is going nowhere, he finally quits, leaving the remaining four to continue without him. However, one evening back in their flat, Del turns on the TV to find Rodney's old band performing on Top of the Pops.

Rodney had recurring nightmares about his nephew, Damien. He was convinced that he was going to be the son of Satan.

It is implied in some episodes that Rodney is a Chelsea supporter. In "The Long Legs of the Law", Del remarks that ICI have dropped a point, to which Rodney replies that "Chelsea dropped three on Saturday!" In a later episode, "A Royal Flush", he takes Victoria to see a football match at Stamford Bridge.
