= Shaun Dingwall =

British actor (born 1970)

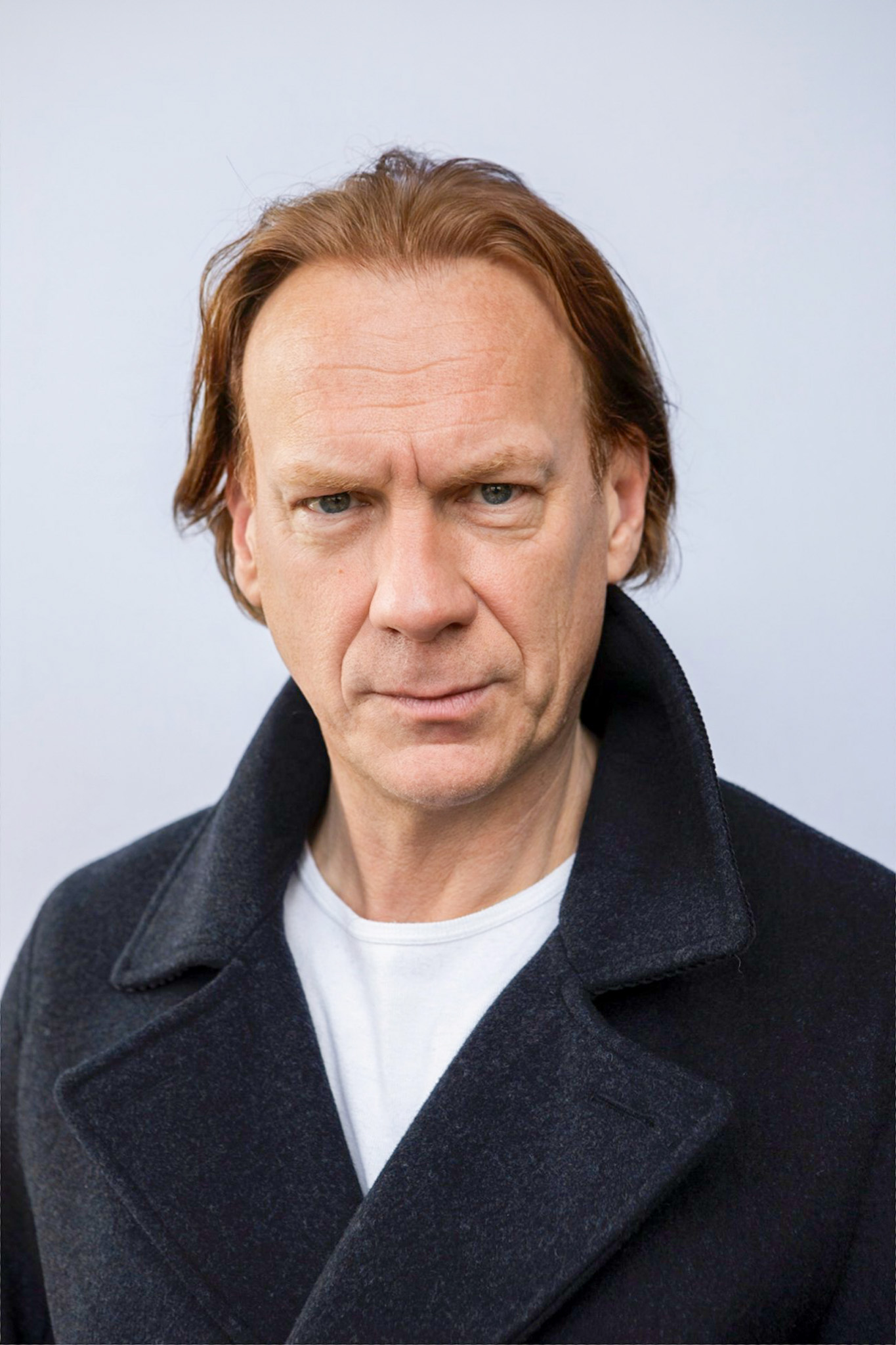
- Born: 21 February 1970 (age 56); London, England
- Education: Royal Central School of Speech and Drama
- Occupation: Actor

Shaun Dingwall (born 21 February 1970) is a British actor. He has appeared in the BBC series Noughts + Crosses, the BAFTA and EMMY award-winning film Responsible Child (2019) and the Netflix series Top Boy.

His other credits include the BBC One serial Charles II: The Power and the Passion (as Thomas Osborne, Earl of Danby), directed by Joe Wright. He also appeared in another period drama, the BBC adaptation of Crime and Punishment, as Rhazhumikin. He also played the recurring character Pete Tyler in the revival of Doctor Who. One of Dingwall's earlier roles was as Lance Corporal Steve Evans in Soldier Soldier. He later played Major Godber in the Channel 4 film Mark of Cain, and was a burglar in The Phoenix and the Carpet (1997).

== Early life ==
Dingwall was born in London and attended the Central School of Speech and Drama.

== Television ==
Dingwall was a regular in ITV's series of police thriller serials, Touching Evil, from 1997 to 1999. In 2000, he appeared as James Freeman in the BBC epic serial In a Land of Plenty. He was cast in the BBC One miniseries Charles II: The Power and the Passion in 2003. In 2004, he appeared in a guest role as Lenny, a hippy criminologist in BBC Two's adaptation of The Long Firm written by Joe Penhall, and as Scipio Africanus in the BBC docu-drama Hannibal (2006).

Dingwall would go on to play Pete Tyler, Rose Tyler's father, in the Doctor Who episode "Father's Day" (2005), a role which he would reprise in "Rise of the Cybermen"/"The Age of Steel" and "Doomsday" (2006). In 2007, Dingwall appeared in the BBC television film Learners also directed by Francesca Joseph. The following year, he played David Grant, Abby's husband, in the re-imagined BBC series Survivors.

In January 2009, he appeared in the TV drama Above Suspicion as DI Mike Lewis. He subsequently played a main role in the three episodes of Rock & Chips (2010-11), a prequel to the long-running series Only Fools and Horses, where he played the role of Reg Trotter, Del Boy's father.

In August 2011, Dingwall appeared as Detective Superintendent Stuart Barlow in New Tricks on BBC One and in 2014, he appeared in The Driver. From 2016 onward, he has played Inspector Janvier in Maigret, starring Rowan Atkinson. In 2019, Dingwall reprised his role of Pete Tyler in Big Finish's audio drama "Rose Tyler: The Dimension Cannon" alongside Billie Piper and Camille Coduri.

He received acclaim for his performance in the 2019 BBC drama Responsible Child, with The Guardian writing that he "perfectly captures the bitter toxicity of a certain kind of man". Dingwall appeared in the 2020 BBC series Noughts + Crosses as the leader of a Nought terrorist group called the Liberation Militia, Jack Dorn.

== Film ==
Dingwall's film career began with a small role in Second Best playing the same character as William Hurt. Dingwall portrayed a younger version of the character Graham in several flashback scenes. The film was directed by Academy Award winner Chris Menges and also stars John Hurt. This was followed by Villa Des Roses where Dingwall played Richard Grunewald, the German artist who wins the heart of Louise Creteur, played by Julie Delpy. The film is an adaptation of the well-known Belgian novel, and went on to win the Best Feature award at the 2002 Hollywood Film Festival.

Dingwall also played Kevin in the BBC film Tomorrow La Scala!. The film was a huge hit at the Cannes Film Festival but did not receive a theatrical release. (The film was directed by Francesca Joseph, with whom Dingwall later worked on Learners.)

Other appearances in films include On a Clear Day, Colour Me Kubrick, Someone Else and Hush. He is also known for his work in The Young Victoria (2009) and Moses Jones (2009).

In Goodbye Christopher Robin (2017) Dingwall played Alfred Brockwell, the soon-to-be husband of nanny Olive "Nou" Rand, played by Kelly Macdonald.

He most recently appeared in Inland as John alongside Mark Rylance. Dingwall was also an executive producer.

== Theatre ==
Dingwall has appeared in London's West End several times.

Most recently he made his Royal Shakespeare Company debut as Frank/Tommy in Cowbois. The play opened in Stratford-upon-Avon and transferred to the Royal Court Theatre. He appeared in The Man Who Had All the Luck at the Donmar Warehouse as Gus, the enigmatic Austrian mechanic in search of the American dream. This was Dingwall's second time at the Donmar. He appeared there in Beautiful Thing in 1995 playing Ste. Other appearances have included Joey in Incomplete and Random Acts of Kindness at the Royal Court and Achilles in Troilus and Cressida at the Old Vic. In 2004, Dingwall fulfilled a lifelong ambition by playing Hotspur in Henry IV, Part 1 at the Bristol Old Vic.

== Filmography ==
=== Film ===
Year	Title	Role	Notes	Ref
1993	Genghis Cohn	Sergeant Hubsch		
1994	Second Best	Graham Holt, age 20		
1999	Underground	Jake	Television film	
2001	Lloyd & Hill	Patrick Murray	Television film	
2002	Villa des Roses	Richard Grünewald		
2002	Tomorrow La Scala!	Kevin		
2003	Carla	Paul	Television film	
2004	The Boy with Blue Eyes	The Father	Short film	
2005	On a Clear Day	Observer		
2005	Colour Me Kubrick	Maître D'		
2006	Hannibal	Scipio Africanus	Television film	
2006	Someone Else	Michael		
2007	The Mark of Cain	Major Godber		
2007	Sex, the City and Me	Tony	Television film	
2007	Outlanders	DI Cartwright		
2007	Learners	Ian	Television film	
2008	Hush	PC Mitchall		
2009	The Young Victoria	Footman		
2013	Summer in February	Harold Knight		
2013	Scar Tissue	Snowdon		
2014	The Forgotten	Mark		
2017	Goodbye Christopher Robin	Alfred Brockwell		
2019	Responsible Child	Scott	Television film	
2022	Inland	John		

=== Television ===
Year	Title	Role	Notes	Ref
1993	Between the Lines	P.C. Curles	Episode: "Jumping the Lights"	
1993	The Bill	Shaun Gibbs	Episode: "Shock to the System"	
1994	Minder	Wayne	Episode: "A Fridge Too Far"	
1994	The Chief	PC Byrne	Recurring role; 2 episodes	
1994	Class Act	DS Lynch	Episode: "Series 1, Episode 2"	
1994	The Bill	Colin Drake	Episode: "On the Latch"	
1994	Stages	Man A	Episode: "Low Level Panic"	
1994	Screen One	Lance-Corporal	Episode: "A Breed of Heroes"	
1995	Screen Two	Schuster	Episode: "Black Easter"	
1995-96	Soldier Soldier	Lance Corporal Steve Evans	Series regular; 22 episodes	
1997	The Phoenix and the Carpet	Burglar	Miniseries; 6 episodes	
1997-99	Touching Evil	DC Mark Rivers	Series regular; 16 episodes	
2001	In a Land of Plenty	James Freeman	Series regular; 9 episodes	
2002	Crime and Punishment	Razumikhin	Miniseries; 2 episodes	
2003	Messiah 2: Vengeance Is Mine	Daniel Jameson	Miniseries; 2 episodes	
2003	Charles II: The Power and the Passion	The Earl of Danby	Miniseries; 2 episodes	
2004	Family Business	Andy Sullivan	Episode: "Series 1, Episode 3"	
2004	The Long Firm	Lenny	Episode: "Lenny's Story"	
2005-06	Doctor Who	Pete Tyler	Recurring role; 4 episodes	
2006	Spooks	Steven Paynton	Episode: "Agenda"	
2008	Survivors	David Grant	Episode: "Series 1, Episode 1"	
2009	Moses Jones	Roger Dankorth	Miniseries; 2 episodes	
2009-12	Above Suspicion	DI/DCI Mike Lewis	Series regular; 11 episodes	
2010-11	Rock & Chips	Reg Trotter	Miniseries; 3 episodes	
2011	Midsomer Murders	Carter Smith	Episode: "Fit for Murder"	
2011	Camelot	Ernald	Episode: "Justice"	
2011	New Tricks	Detective Superintendent Stuart Barlow	Episode: "Only the Brave"	
2013	The Suspicions of Mr Whicher	Inspector George Lock	Episode: "The Murder in Angel Lane"	
2013	Vera	Justin Bishop	Episode: "Castles in the Air"	
2013	Agatha Christie's Poirot	Doctor Franklin	Episode: "Curtain: Poirot's Last Case"	
2013	Breathless	Charlie Enderbury	Miniseries: 6 episodes	
2014	The Driver	Detective Ryder	Miniseries; 2 episodes	
2015	Silent Witness	Adam Lansley	Episode: "Squaring the Circle"	
2015	Death in Paradise	Paul Harmer	Episode: "Unlike Father, Unlike Son"	
2015	Legends	Liam Crawford	Recurring role; 3 episodes	
2016	DCI Banks	Chief Superintendent Colin Anderson	Recurring role; 5 episodes	
2016-17	Maigret	Inspector Janvier	Miniseries; 4 episodes	
2019-23	Top Boy	Jeffrey Daughton	Recurring role; 8 episodes	
2020	Noughts + Crosses	Jack Dorn	Series regular; 6 episodes	
2023	Grantchester	Ron Weller	Episode: "Series 8, Episode 1"	
2024	Constellation	Ian Rogers	Recurring role; 2 episodes	
