= Rock & Chips =

British television miniseries

- Genre: Comedy drama
- Created by: John Sullivan
- Written by: John Sullivan
- Directed by: Dewi Humphreys
- Starring: Nicholas Lyndhurst; James Buckley; Kellie Bright; Shaun Dingwall; Phil Daniels; Paula Wilcox; Paul Putner; Katie Griffiths; Alison Pargeter; Mel Smith
- Country of origin: United Kingdom
- Original language: English
- No. of episodes: 3

Production
- Executive producers: John Sullivan; Mark Freeland
- Producer: Gareth Gwenlan
- Production locations: Peckham, London, England
- Running time: 90 minutes (pilot); 60 minutes (specials)
- Production companies: BBC Studios Comedy Productions; Shazam Productions

Original release
- Network: BBC One
- Release: 24 January 2010 – 28 April 2011

Related
- Only Fools and Horses; The Green Green Grass

Rock & Chips is a British television comedy drama miniseries and a prequel to the sitcom Only Fools and Horses. The show is set in Peckham, southeast London, during the early 1960s, focusing primarily on the lives of Del Trotter, Freddie Robdal, and Joan and Reg Trotter. Nicholas Lyndhurst, who played Rodney in Only Fools and Horses, plays Robdal, alongside James Buckley (Del Boy), Kellie Bright (Joan), Shaun Dingwall (Reg) and Phil Daniels (Grandad). The Shazam and BBC Studios Comedy Drama co-production was written by Only Fools and Horses creator John Sullivan, directed by Dewi Humphreys, and produced by Gareth Gwenlan.

The 90-minute pilot was conceived in 1996 and commissioned in 2003, with the premise established in the final episode of Only Fools and Horses in 2003. It was shelved and Only Fools and Horses spin-off The Green Green Grass was developed; its success led to the prequel being recommissioned in July 2009. Filming began in October in London and the production was first broadcast on BBC One and BBC HD on 24 January 2010. It was the second–most watched programme of the day but gained mixed reviews from critics.

== Plot ==
In February 1960 in Peckham, Joan Trotter (Kellie Bright) is in an unhappy marriage with the lazy Reg (Shaun Dingwall), whose father Ted (Phil Daniels) has just moved in. Her 15-year-old son Derek (James Buckley), nicknamed "Del Boy", and his friends Boycie, Trigger, Jumbo Mills and Denzil (Stephen Lloyd, Lewis Osborne, Lee Long and Ashley Gerlach) are still in school, following an increase in the school-leaving age. Joan works at the local cinema with Trigger's aunt Reenie Turpin (Emma Cooke) and Raymond (Billy Seymour) for cinema manager Ernie Rayner (Robert Daws), and at the town hall. Meanwhile, convicted thief Freddie Robdal (Nicholas Lyndhurst) has recently been released from Dartmoor Prison, returning to Peckham with explosives expert Gerald "Jelly" Kelly (Paul Putner).

Whilst at The Nag's Head pub, Joan meets Freddie and, soon after, a romance develops between them. Joan informs Freddie that the safe at the cinema she works at contains £2,000 on weekends. In March, the safe at the cinema is broken into. Reenie tells Joan about Freddie's time in prison, and she realises he burgled the cinema. After Freddie tells Kelly he thinks he is in love with Joan, Reg announces her pregnancy in the pub. However, Joan fails to acknowledge the baby is Freddie's.

The Trotters move into the new Sir Walter Raleigh House in October. In November, Joan has her baby, which she calls Rodney. Joan sees Freddie on a balcony in a tower opposite; she shows him Rodney and nods her head, to his delight.

Further episodes tell of Del's strained relationship with his father and his affection for his mother; Reg's affair with the barmaid at The Nag's Head; Del and Jumbo selling of goods from the docks out of the back of a van; Del and Boycie's attempt at dating Pam and Glenda (Jodie Mooney and Katie Griffiths); Joan fending off advances from her perverted boss; and run-ins with Roy Slater, a police cadet (Calum MacNab).

== Cast ==
=== Main ===
- James Buckley as Del Boy
- Nicholas Lyndhurst as Freddie "The Frog" Robdal
- Phil Daniels as Ted Trotter
- Kellie Bright as Joan Trotter
- Shaun Dingwall as Reg Trotter
- Emma Cooke as Reenie Turpin
- Paul Putner as Gerald "Jelly" Kelly
- Lewis Osborne as Trigger
- Stephen Lloyd as Boycie
- Ashley Gerlach as Denzil
- Lee Long as Jumbo Mills
- Alison Pargeter as Val
- Robert Daws as Ernie Rayner
- Billy Seymour as Raymond

=== Recurring ===
- Calum MacNab as Roy Slater
- Mel Smith as DI Thomas
- Paula Wilcox as Violet Trotter
- Joan Hodges as Gwen
- Katie Griffiths as Glenda

== Production ==
Writer John Sullivan first had the idea for a prequel to the sitcom Only Fools and Horses in 1996; a commission for the prequel was announced in 2003. The premise for the series had been established in the final Only Fools and Horses episode "Sleepless in Peckham" (2003), where Rodney discovers a photograph of Freddie Robdal from 1960. His uncanny resemblance to Rodney confirmed that he, and not Reg, was Rodney's biological father. A majority of the backstory involving Robdal had been explored in the Christmas special "The Frog's Legacy" (1987). In the episode, Rodney questions Uncle Albert about his father, to which Albert diplomatically replies, "They're rumours Rodney. That's all. Rumours." The proposed prequel was to be titled Once Upon a Time in Peckham, and would involve young versions of Del Boy, Boycie, Denzil and Trigger. Sullivan stated that, "Joanie will be a key character, and during the film will give birth to Rodney." However, the prequel was shelved, and spin-off The Green Green Grass was developed to follow secondary characters Boycie, Marlene and their son Tyler, as they escape the London Mafia and attempt to live in the Shropshire countryside. However, in January 2009, It was reported that the prequel was being considered again, following the success of The Green Green Grass.

On 3 July 2009, the BBC announced that the prequel had been commissioned as a 90-minute comedy drama, titled Sex, Drugs & Rock 'n' Chips, to be co-produced by the BBC and Sullivan's production company, Shazam Productions. Originally scheduled for August, filming began in October 2009 in London, lasting 19 days. Nicholas Lyndhurst described the budget as being "not great", stating that "it was a costume drama and it needed a costume drama budget, and it didn't get that". The Pelton Arms in Greenwich served as The Nag's Head during filming.

Lyndhurst, who played Rodney in Only Fools and Horses, would play villain and art connoisseur Freddie Robdal, in a reprise of his role in the "Sleepless in Peckham" photograph. Lyndhurst described Freddie as "a villain – charming, but nasty". He ensured not to make his performance comparable to Rodney's, describing them as being "like chalk and cheese". Kellie Bright (Bad Girls, The Archers) would play the "glamorous" Joan Trotter, while her husband Reg would be portrayed by Shaun Dingwall (Soldier Soldier, Doctor Who), and his father, Ted, by Phil Daniels (Quadrophenia, EastEnders). James Buckley (The Inbetweeners), would play the teenage Derek, Joan and Reg's son, who had been portrayed by David Jason in Only Fools and Horses. Dewi Humphreys (The Green Green Grass) would direct. It was announced in January 2010 that the production would be shown on 24 January on BBC One with the title Rock & Chips, named for rock salmon and chips, which Sullivan described as "the staple diet" of Peckham during that era.

Sullivan wished to explore the origins of Del Boy and Rodney, as well as their mother, Joan. Sullivan stated that he "decided to return to those misty days of 1960 to meet all those characters we'd only ever heard about". The drama was produced by Gareth Gwenlan, who worked on Only Fools and Horses between 1988 and 2003. Speaking to the Western Mail, Gwenlan described it as "essentially a love story" between Joan and Freddie, and he said that Lyndhurst "told me he thinks it's the best thing he's ever done". Speaking about the casting of Lyndhurst, he said he "would make a marvellous villain, which is something people will never have seen him do on TV before".

Regarding the continuation of the story, Gwenlan stated that the production was "run on the idea it'll be turned into a series. This one lays the groundwork and John [Sullivan] has enough for about two more series." On 13 September 2010, while promoting the third series of The Inbetweeners on BBC Radio 5 Live, James Buckley confirmed that Rock & Chips would return for two more specials, one for Christmas 2010, and the other for Easter 2011. John Sullivan died on 22 April 2011, six days before the final episode was broadcast; he had been intending to write more episodes for the series.

== Episodes ==
No.	Title	Directed by	Written by	Running time	Original release date	UK viewers (millions)
1	"Rock & Chips"	Dewi Humphreys	John Sullivan	90 minutes	24 January 2010	8.42
Set in Peckham in 1960, Joan Trotter is in an unhappy marriage with the work-shy Reg, with whom she has a teenage son, Derek ("Del Boy"). Joan's life changes, however, with the reappearance of Freddie Robdal, the bank robber and womaniser, who has recently been released from a ten-year prison sentence.
2	"Five Gold Rings"	Dewi Humphreys	John Sullivan	60 minutes	29 December 2010	5.83
Christmas, 1960. The Trotters are settling into their new flat in Sir Walter Raleigh House, Peckham. Ted and Reg are on the dole, while hard-working Joan returns to her job at the cinema, asking her mother-in-law Violet to look after baby Rodney. 16-year-old Del, who has left school, is exploring employment opportunities around the docks, while Rodney's father Freddie Robdal has been temporarily detained in Wormwood Scrubs.
3	"The Frog and the Pussycat"	Dewi Humphreys	John Sullivan	60 minutes	28 April 2011	3.77
Joan longs for a new life, while Del has new aspirations to become a film producer. Lacking finance, Del hopes his latest girlfriend might persuade her father to invest.

== Reception ==
Overnight figures estimated Rock & Chips was seen by 7.4 million viewers with a 28% audience share, winning the slot against ITV's Wild at Heart and the Dancing on Ice results show. It was the second most-watched programme of the day, behind the first Dancing on Ice programme of the evening. Final figures showed it was seen by 8.42 million viewers on BBC One and 279,000 on BBC HD.

Sam Wollaston for The Guardian said he was missing the interplay between Rodney and Del Boy from the original, and that the only fun in the drama was "recognising the nods, working out who's who and how it all fits into place. Otherwise, it's pretty lame." The Daily Mirror's Jim Shelley did not find the storyline "interesting or convincing", finding Lyndhurst's performance as Freddie "laughable" and saying it was "bizarre" that the storyline "virtually abandoned its main character (the young Del Boy) and its best actor (James Buckley from The Inbetweeners) who played him". In The Independent, Tom Sutcliffe said that "the narrative's focus was blurred and the pacing weirdly off – quite a lot of the time you were well ahead of the drama and hanging around for it to catch up with you". Benji Wilson from The Daily Telegraph also was not impressed, saying the viewer would have been disappointed if they "tuned in wanting to be entertained, enthused, or anything in between", and that it was an "ocean-going stinker".

However, The Scotsman's Paul Whitelaw said that, despite a "disjointed" plot and it being "overstretched at 90 minutes", the special "was actually pretty good. Not great, not perfect, but a watchable production from which everyone emerged with their dignity intact". He said that Buckley, "delivered a charming performance in what was effectively a supporting role. Wisely choosing to suggest Del's familiar mannerisms without opting for outright impersonation, he carried off a difficult task with modest élan". Writing for The Stage, Harry Venning found the performances "top notch" and praised the script as "first class", saying "the comic moments were of the highest quality and beautifully crafted into the narrative". Andrew Billen from The Times described Bright's portrayal of Joan as "winsome", said Lyndhurst "produced a detailed performance" and that "Rock & Chips was better than the sequel that preceded it". Keith Watson in the Metro also praised the performances of Buckley and Bright, saying, "They deserved a show all to themselves." Although he found the period detail "squeaky clean" and "unconvincing", he closed his review by saying: "Somehow it made me care about the Trotters in a way decades of Only Fools and Horses never came close to."
