= Lewis Osborne =

British actor (born 1991)

Lewis Osborne is a British actor best known for the Only Fools and Horses prequel, Rock & Chips.

He was born in London in 1991 and attended The Brit School in Surrey where he studied acting.

== Filmography ==
As actor:

- Rock & Chips 2010–2011
- Life of Riley 2011
- Dead Man's Lake 2012

As self:

- Trust Me I'm a Teenager 2003
