= Learners (film) =

2007 British television film

- Learners poster
- Genre: Comedy-drama
- Written by: Jessica Hynes
- Directed by: Francesca Joseph
- Starring: Jessica Hynes; Shaun Dingwall; David Tennant; Sarah Hadland
- Country of origin: United Kingdom
- Original language: English

Production
- Executive producer: David M. Thompson
- Producers: Ruth Caleb; Luke Alkin
- Running time: 78 mins

Original release
- Network: BBC One
- Release: 11 November 2007

Learners is a British comedy drama television film written by Jessica Hynes and directed by Francesca Joseph, it stars Hynes, David Tennant, Shaun Dingwall and Sarah Hadland. The film was announced by the BBC on 3 April 2007 and was broadcast on 11 November 2007. The DVD was released on 12 November 2007.

== Synopsis ==
The film tells the story of a group of learner drivers. One of them, Beverly (Hynes), is a housewife who works as a cleaner at the police station and has failed her driving exams eight times, mainly because her husband Ian (Shaun Dingwall) is too impatient giving her driving lessons. She decides to take driving lessons from Chris (David Tennant), a devout Christian driving instructor at Gear Change, with whom she falls in love. However Chris loves his boss Fiona (Sarah Hadland) who is having an affair with Beverly's colleague, policeman Gerry.

Beverly tries to raise cash for her driving lessons, because Ian spent all their money on a pair of owls, hoping to sell their offspring for a profit. She ends up looting her daughter's savings for university. During her ninth secret driving test, she runs into Ian on the street, thus failing again. To make matters worse, Chris leaves Gear Change, because Fiona has an affair with Gerry, leaving all learner drivers without their favourite teacher. However, Chris returns when Fiona breaks up with Gerry, despite finding herself pregnant by him.

When one of the owls gets sick, threatening the life of the eggs, Beverly must drive to the vet herself. She runs into Gerry on the motorway, who escorts her to the vet. The owl and eggs are saved, reuniting the family, giving Beverly enough confidence to try her test again, and pass this time.

== Cast ==
- Jessica Hynes as Beverly
- Shaun Dingwall as Ian
- David Tennant as Chris
- Sarah Hadland as Fiona
- Richard Glover as Examiner
- Tameka Empson as Gloria
- Con O'Neill as Gerry
- Mathew Baynton as Howard
- Laura Solon as Ivana
- Jordan Long as Bailiff
- Danny McEvoy as Alfie
- Megan Jones as Juanita
- Kyle Summercorn as Toby
- Michael Maloney as John
- Simon Day as Simon
- Bernadette Wilfred as Nurse
- Lucas Hare as Vet

=== Cast notes ===
Writer Jessica Hynes, who also stars as Beverly, had previously appeared together with David Tennant in the Doctor Who episodes "Human Nature" and "The Family of Blood". Shaun Dingwall was a recurring guest star in series 1 and 2 of Doctor Who.

== Production ==
Learners started filming in April 2007 on location in Hertfordshire. Beverly's house was filmed at Breach Barnes in Waltham Abbey behind First Avenue. Some of the mobile home's fences had to be removed in order for actors to walk through.
