= Beckham in Peckham =

- Only Fools and Horses episode
- Rodney and Del Boy, pictured with former professional footballer David Beckham.
- Directed by: Tony Dow
- Written by: Jim Sullivan, Dan Sullivan and John Sullivan
- Original air date: 21 March 2014
- Running time: 10 minutes and 30 seconds

Guest appearance
- David Beckham as himself

"Beckham in Peckham" is a 10 minute edition of the BBC sitcom Only Fools and Horses, broadcast as part of the Sport Relief 2014 appeal on 21 March 2014. Actors David Jason and Nicholas Lyndhurst reprised their roles as Del Boy and Rodney in the sketch written by Jim Sullivan and Dan Sullivan; the script included previously unused material written by their father John Sullivan, who created and wrote every episode of the series. David Beckham guest starred, Beckham having got in touch with Jim Sullivan.

According to Shazam Productions there was a lot of interest in the sketch. The return of Only Fools and Horses was eagerly awaited by fans of the show, which ran from 1981 until 2003.

This special sketch was dedicated to the memory of John Sullivan and Roger Lloyd-Pack, who had both died prior to its broadcast.

== Synopsis ==
An unspecified amount of time after the series' last regular episode "Sleepless in Peckham", Del Boy is in Peckham market, trying to sell "Golden Balls" underpants which are supposedly endorsed and signed by David Beckham (in return for Del Boy securing a bouncy castle for the birthday party of one of Beckham's sons, Brooklyn, whom Del incorrectly calls Brookside), with Rodney serving as a less-than-enthusiastic model. After failing to sell anything, the Trotters retreat to a nearby café, where Rodney complains about Del's treatment of him. Del apologises, mentioning several incidents where he had mistreated Rodney (in previous regular Only Fools and Horses episodes). It is then revealed that sharing the table with the two is David Beckham, who really has endorsed the underpants. The three briefly chat, including Rodney and Beckham discussing their favourite artist (Rodney choosing Matisse, and Beckham choosing Tony Hart), before Beckham gives Rodney tips on how to model underwear effectively, advising him to "glide" and "oscillate".

Later, Del is again trying to sell the underpants, with Rodney putting on a bizarre, vaguely feminine walk, and being even more angry at Del than he was before, telling him: "Derek, I'm going to kill you". Beckham is discreetly watching this, when a young boy walks up to him, and asks him if he's David Beckham. He says that he is, and signs the boy's football, but says not to tell anyone he is there, as he does not want to draw any more attention to himself. Beckham then attempts to lean back on a goods cart, but a trader has moved it away while he wasn't looking and he falls to the ground (referencing a famous moment in the episode "Yuppy Love"), getting the attention of everyone in the market. Del and Rodney comment, "What a plonker!"

== Episode cast ==
Actor	Role
David Jason	Derek Trotter
Nicholas Lyndhurst	Rodney Trotter
David Beckham	himself
Joe Sullivan	Young Boy
