= Del Boy =

Fictional character from Only Fools and Horses

Derek (Del Boy) Trotter
- Only Fools and Horses and Rock & Chips character
- First appearance: 'Big Brother' (1981)
- Last appearance: 'Beckham in Peckham' (2014)
- Created by: John Sullivan
- Portrayed by: David Jason (Only Fools and Horses); James Buckley (Rock & Chips); Sam Lupton (Only Fools and Horses: The Musical)

In-universe information
- Occupation: Market trader; Entrepreneur
- Family: Reg Trotter (father); Joan Trotter (mother); Rodney Trotter (half-brother)
- Spouse: Raquel Turner (partner)
- Children: Damien Trotter
- Relatives: Ted Trotter (grandfather); Vi Trotter (grandmother); Albert Trotter (great-uncle); Joan Trotter (niece)
- Home: Peckham, South London, England

Derek Edward Trotter, more commonly known as Del Boy, is a fictional character from the BBC sitcom Only Fools and Horses and one of the main characters of its spinoff series, Rock & Chips. He was played by David Jason in the original series and was portrayed as a teenager by James Buckley in the prequel. Del Boy is often regarded as one of the greatest comedy characters in the history of British television, and is regarded as an iconic character in British culture. In a 2001 poll conducted by Channel 4 Del Boy was ranked fourth on their list of the 100 Greatest TV Characters.

Incorporating aspects of Cockney culture (though not an actual Cockney), Del Boy is known for his broken French phrases, which are usually completely out of context, and a variety of British and Cockney catchphrases, including: "He who dares, wins!", "This time next year we'll be millionaires", "Cushty!", "Lovely Jubbly!", "You know it makes sense" (which he usually says to his customers after they have agreed on a deal), "Shut up, you tart" and "You plonker!", usually said to Rodney.

== Personality ==
Del Boy is a happy-go-lucky, cheeky character. While not always successful, his general optimism and confidence often persuade people to believe in him. Despite his general positive demeanour, the episode Diamonds Are For Heather reveals that Del Boy has suffered from feelings of loneliness over his lack of a family beyond Grandad and Rodney on at least one occasion. In the episode Del mentions visiting a friend's Christening party and seeing his friend's family had come to join in the celebration, at which point Del felt so upset that he left early.

His favourite song is "Old Shep", and his favourite band is the Who. He likes the superhero Batman. In "The Long Legs of the Law" he implies that he supports Chelsea. In "A Slow Bus to Chingford" Rodney tells his date Janice that Del "used to be cultural advisor to the Chelsea Shed", a reference to the Shed End at Stamford Bridge where the most fanatical Chelsea fans would stand. In other episodes, a Crystal Palace F.C. scarf is seen hanging from the hallway. He cannot swim– the certificate in his possession is not his– nor fly a hang glider.

From the sixth series on, he adopts some of the mannerisms of a stereotypical yuppie of the late 1980s, pretending to be much more wealthy than he really is, as he tries to associate with the upper classes despite being obviously underclass.

Del Boy is a compulsive liar, particularly to women, customers, policemen and even his family and doctors. He sometimes lies when it is against his best interests, such as when he claims to be a health freak while suffering from severe stomach pains, leading to his spending several days under observation in hospital rather than receiving an immediate diagnosis.

It is revealed in "Sickness and Wealth" that he is frightened of doctors, which causes him to resist Albert and Rodney's advice for him to see one, until a medium tricks him into believing his late mother wants him to visit the doctor about his stomach. His fear of doctors goes so far that in the same episode Rodney mentions to Cassandra that Del was once stabbed outside a nightclub by a former fiancée, and rather than seek medical attention he treated the stab wound himself with the help of a bottle of TCP.

In "Fatal Extraction", it is revealed that Del is also frightened of dentists, avoiding visiting them whenever possible (his previous dentist died on the night of the Queen's Silver Jubilee in 1977) and only reluctantly visiting due to bad toothache.

Del presents himself as being able to speak some French, though few of his phrases make any sense in the context he uses them in (e.g. saying "au revoir" to mean "hello" and "bonjour" as goodbye). He also thinks he has knowledge in subjects like geography (believing Stockholm to be in Norway), history, art and other academic subjects (his lack of knowledge in history is shown well in "To Hull and Back" in which he calls Albert "the finest little sailor this country has produced since Nelson lost the Armada"). He believes the term "yuppie" to be a compliment, and unintentionally causes considerable offence when he calls a person a yuppie to their face.

Del Boy is not always honest when expressing his love for his family and others. This side of his nature is shown in numerous episodes, such as "Diamonds Are for Heather", "Strained Relations", "Dates", "The Yellow Peril" and "Little Problems". His care for his grandfather ("Grandad" – Lennard Pearce) is shown in "The Second Time Around", when Del is henpecked by his fiancée Pauline Harris, but only puts his foot down when Pauline recommends putting Grandad in an old folks home. Another example of this care is shown in "May the Force be With You". Faced with the possibility of Del and Rodney going to prison for handling a stolen microwave, corrupt policeman Roy Slater makes a cryptic comment suggesting that an alone and vulnerable Grandad could fall victim to an attack by some hired thugs. Del, having previously refused to name the thief, makes a deal with Slater to guarantee their release, with immunity from prosecution for doing so. Once he is given immunity from prosecution, he names himself as the thief.

Del is later diagnosed with irritable bowel syndrome caused by his diet of fast foods, cigars and alcohol.

Although engaged many times, he never marries. He has had many girlfriends, a fact that is the subject of numerous sarcastic comments by Rodney. He finally meets his partner Raquel Turner (whom he calls his "significant other") in the 1988 special "Dates".

== Personal life ==
=== Family ===
James Buckley (left) as a young Del Boy, alongside David Jason and Nicholas Lyndhurst on the set of Rock & Chips

Derek Edward Trotter was born to Joan Hollins and Reg Trotter. He was named after his two grandfathers, Derek and Edward.

Del's mother Joan died on 12 March 1964, apparently after a long period of ill health. His neglectful father Reginald leaves three months later, on Del's 16th birthday, taking most of their money and even Del's birthday cake. This leaves the teenage Del as the family's sole provider, looking after his grandfather and Rodney, his half-brother who was born around thirteen years after him (the age gap is stated as thirteen years in one episode, but Rodney's year of birth is anywhere between 1958 and 1963 according to different episodes). He lives with Raquel and their son Damien at flat 368 on the twelfth floor of the fictional Nelson Mandela House in Peckham, London. Before that, he lives in an old, terraced house in 39 Orchard Street with his mother, father and grandfather. His grandfather was an "out of work lamp-lighter waiting for gas to make a comeback." In the episode Sleepless in Peckham Del gives the implication that his father was also a physically abusive bully who used to beat women and children, including Joan and Del. Del's father was friends with Freddie Robdal, who became better known as Freddie the Frog. It was Del's father who also brought Freddie to his home one night, which led to an affair between him and Joan, and soon after, the birth of Rodney. When he was a youngster, Del was always told to call Freddie "Uncle Fred". Then, years later, when Uncle Albert got drunk one night at a party, he told Del all about the affair. Sometime afterwards, Uncle Albert told Del that Trigger’s aunt Rene took all the photos of Del's mum because each one had a picture of Freddie in it, and she knew that when Rodney grew older the similarities would start to show, so she burnt all the photos of Joan after her funeral.

=== Relationship with other characters ===
Del Boy has many friends during the series; Denzil, Trigger, Boycie, Marlene and Mike, to name but a few. His enemy is DCI Roy Slater. Del is courageous and, although not intellectual, he is quick-witted but inadvertently gets Rodney into trouble. In "Wanted", when a mentally unstable woman accuses Rodney of attacking her, Del makes a joke of it and says that the police have named Rodney "The Peckham Pouncer". He is selfish, but can be very thoughtful, such as when he tried to help Rodney get over his wife Cassandra's miscarriage of their first baby. He never hesitates to remind people about how he brought Rodney up practically on his own after their mother died and father left, often using this fact to win arguments with Rodney. He is also shown to be quite duplicitous, once described by corrupt policeman and former school peer Roy Slater as "A man who could talk himself out of a room with no doors". In "May the Force Be With You", he was arrested by Slater for handling a stolen microwave, but gained his release by agreeing to name the thief provided he and his family were granted immunity from prosecution. Once Del's immunity was guaranteed, he confessed that he was the thief, confidently showing a shocked Slater his immunity papers.

Del and Rodney often tease Uncle Albert about his appearance and resemblance to Captain Birdseye, although they show fonder feelings for him when he dies in "If They Could See Us Now". Rodney apologises for the way he treats Albert in "Sickness and Wealth".

In Rock & Chips, Del Boy is shown to have a deeply close relationship with his mother Joan, whom he is very protective of. (He is Joan's favourite, to the point that she refuses to run away with Freddie Robdal until she is certain of Del's financial security.) His relationship with Grandad is the same in Rock & Chips as in Only Fools and Horses, but he has an estranged relationship with his father Reg. It is clear that they love each other, but they are sometimes at odds, particularly regarding Reg's slacker lifestyle and when Reg verbally abuses Joan, when Del threatens to harm him if he does it again. Del is also visibly disgusted to hear that Joan is pregnant with what he incorrectly believes to be Reg's second child. By the end of the pilot episode, their relationship begins to improve, although in Only Fools and Horses it is clear that Del has still not forgiven Reg for abandoning the family after Joan's death. This is demonstrated in "Thicker than Water" when he nearly ejects Reg from the flat. But Del still appears to feel some familial loyalty to Reg, shown when he gives him some money just before his departure.

== Career ==
Del Boy works as a market trader, running his own company, Trotters Independent Traders (T.I.T.), either from out of a suitcase or from the back of his bright yellow Reliant Regal van. With a never-ending supply of get-rich-quick schemes and an inner belief in his ability to sell anything to anyone, he embroils "the firm", as he calls the family business, in a variety of improbable situations. This unwavering confidence had given rise to his oft-proclaimed ambition "This time next year, we'll be millionaires!" His business acumen is described in the episode "Mother Nature's Son", when Del is depressed about his financial situation and Rodney says, "The old Derek Trotter could smell a fiver in a force 9 gale. They used to say that if Del Boy fell into a Viper's Pit, he'd come up wearing snake-skin shoes."

However, in the episode "Cash and Curry", from series one, Del lost £2,000 to a pair of confidence tricksters.

While maintaining a tough exterior, Del still mourns the death of his mother and runs T.I.T. with Rodney. He takes great pride in having raised Rodney after their mother's premature death and has never forgiven his father for running away when Rodney was an infant. Despite their often minimal income, Del insists on caring for his elderly grandfather. When Grandad dies, his role in the family trio is taken by his younger brother Albert, who receives the same level of respect (and light-hearted abuse).

Del Boy is a petty criminal and makes no attempt to hide it unless directly confronted by the authorities. On one occasion, he claims that at least half his possessions are illegal, including the furniture. He dabbles in theft, but mostly receives stolen goods and sells them on. He pays no tax, claiming that, since he and his family do not benefit from the welfare state, they should not have to contribute to it. In an early episode, "The Second Time Around", it is implied that he is legally dead and therefore does not pay tax.

Del and Rodney become millionaires, following the sale of a priceless watch, which they discover amongst their inventory. In the feature-length episode "If They Could See Us Now", the Trotters' business is liquidated, Del Boy is declared bankrupt, and he receives a two-year suspended sentence for his years of tax evasion, with a condition that he pay off the outstanding balance within twelve months to avoid being sent to prison. Rodney becomes the managing director of a reformed T.I.T., but this does not stop Del acting as if he runs the business. He fails to make enough to pay his tax bill, but an inheritance from the recently deceased Uncle Albert gives him the money he needs. Despite this, Del continues the business, as shown in the sequel series The Green Green Grass where Boycie is shown to have bought a faulty satellite navigation from Del, as well as some bottles of Latvian shandy, and some bottles of Del's new personal brand of scotch whiskey named "McTrotters".

Del Boy's "autobiography", called He Who Dares, was released in October 2015.

== Appearances ==
=== Television ===
- Only Fools and Horses (64 episodes)
- The Green Green Grass (1 episode; flashback)
- Rock & Chips (3 episodes)
- Sport Relief 2014 Special – "Beckham in Peckham"
- Strictly Come Dancing Cameo, Christmas Special 2021
- The Apprentice Animated Cameo, 2023

=== Online ===
A video of Del Boy cheering on the England team at Euro 2020 was released on YouTube in June 2021.

=== Literature ===
He Who Dares.., the "genuine autobiography" of Derek "Del Boy" Trotter

- Derek "Del Boy" Trotter – He Who Dares... is a 2015 autobiography "written" by "Del Boy" Trotter released in October 2015.

The book was released in memory of the series' creator John Sullivan. The book portrays the events of Rock and Chips and Only Fools and Horses from Del Boy's perspective. The book also covers what happened between and after the events of "Sleepless in Peckham" and "Beckham in Peckham". In marketing for the book, John Challis and Sue Holderness reprised their roles as Boycie and Marlene. It is mentioned in the book that during the events of The Green Green Grass, Del thought Boycie to be dead.

=== Adverts ===
- Radio Times (1985)
- BBC License Fee (1986)
- BBC Christmas Advert (1985)
- Abbey National (1988)
- Rover (1995)
