= Buster Merryfield =

English actor (1920–1999)

- Merryfield as Uncle Albert in Only Fools and Horses
- Born: Harry Merryfield; 27 November 1920; Battersea, London, England
- Died: 23 June 1999 (aged 78); Poole, Dorset, England
- Occupations: Actor, bank manager
- Years active: 1966–1998
- Known for: Only Fools and Horses (1985–1996)
- Spouse: Iris Mountford (m. 1942)
- Children: 1

Harry "Buster" Merryfield (27 November 1920 – 23 June 1999) was an English actor best known for starring as Uncle Albert in the BBC comedy Only Fools and Horses.

== Early life ==
Merryfield was born and raised in Battersea, London, England. His father, also called Harry, was a fitter, and his mother Lily (née Stone) was a part-time waitress. His sister Irene died when she was eight years old. He was given the name "Buster" by his grandfather, as he weighed 9 pounds (4.1 kg) at birth, and it stuck throughout his entire life. He refused to divulge his real name, which only became known after his death.

He followed a strict fitness regime of daily press-ups and swimming sessions. As a boxer, he was a British schoolboy champion in 1936 and Southern Command army champion in 1945. He was also an amateur football player and Millwall supporter, regularly attending games at the Old Den. In contrast to his pipe-smoking and rum-drinking character Uncle Albert, Merryfield was a teetotaller and non-smoker his entire life.

== Career ==
Before turning professional as an actor, Merryfield was a keen amateur actor and director. His productions of John Osborne's The Entertainer (1966), The World–My Canvas (1968) by Ruth Dixon and A View from the Bridge (1969) by Arthur Miller, for the now-defunct amateur theatre group the Characters, won Best Play at the Woking Drama Festival in 1966, 1968 and 1969 respectively. He also won the Best Actor trophy for his roles in The Entertainer and The World–My Canvas.

Merryfield became a professional actor at the age of 57, after having worked for the Westminster Bank for nearly 40 years. He began work there on 11 July 1938 and passed his banking exams in 1939. He reached the position of senior area manager, but his banking career was interrupted by his war service. He spent the war in the army, where his physique allowed him to become a PT and jungle-warfare instructor. Awarded an emergency commission in the Royal Artillery on 13 March 1942, Merryfield was promoted to the rank of second lieutenant. He discovered his love of acting when he served as an entertainment officer staging shows for the troops.

After the war, the now married Merryfield returned to the bank, where he was promoted until he became manager of the Shepperton sub-branch in April 1967; by the time of his early retirement from NatWest in July 1978, he was a bank manager at the Thames Ditton branch in Surrey. After retiring, Merryfield persuaded a repertory company to admit him. He performed at the Connaught Theatre in Worthing in Joseph and the Amazing Technicolour Dreamcoat and Equus. Merryfield appeared in some small television parts, including Hannah in 1980, as Professor Challis in The Citadel in 1983 and as a bishop in Strangers and Brothers in 1984.

Merryfield joined Only Fools and Horses in January 1985 as the former seafaring Albert Gladstone Trotter, known as Uncle Albert, who was Grandad Trotter's long-lost younger brother and was known for his catchphrase of "During the war...". The character was added after Lennard Pearce, who played Grandad, died in December 1984. Nine months earlier in March 1984, Merryfield and Pearce had costarred in two episodes of Shroud for a Nightingale. Merryfield did much work for charities such as the Royal National Lifeboat Institution. He wrote his autobiography, During the War and Other Encounters, in 1996.

In December 1997, Merryfield fell at the British Comedy Awards while walking to the stage to collect an award for David Jason for his part in Only Fools and Horses. Despite cutting his forehead, he continued and collected the award. Merryfield appeared in pantomime during Christmas of 1997 and 1998 in the father role in Beauty and the Beast at the Pavilion Theatre, Bournemouth.

== Personal life ==
Merryfield could play the piano by ear but could not read music. He was also a fan of disco dancing.

== Death ==
Merryfield died at Poole General Hospital on 23 June 1999 as a result of a brain tumour. He was survived by his wife Iris, whom he had married in June 1942, his daughter and two grandchildren. He was buried at Verwood Cemetery, Dorset. Iris died on 5 November 2002 and was buried alongside him.

== Filmography ==
Year	Title	Role	Notes
1983	The Citadel	Professor Challis	2 episode
1984	Shroud for a Nightingale	Sir Miles Honeyman	2 episode
1984	Strangers and Brothers	Bishop	1 episodes
1985–1996	Only Fools and Horses	Albert Gladstone Trotter	37 episodes
