= Grandad (Only Fools and Horses) =

Fictional character from Only Fools and Horses

Ted "Grandad" Trotter
- Only Fools and Horses character
- Lennard Pearce as Grandad
- First appearance: "Big Brother"
- Last appearance: "Thicker than Water"
- Created by: John Sullivan
- Portrayed by: Lennard Pearce (1981–1984); Phil Daniels (2010–2011)

In-universe information
- Occupation: Retired
- Family: Jack Trotter (father); Victoria Trotter (mother); Jack Trotter (brother); George Trotter (brother); Albert Trotter (brother)
- Spouses: Vi Trotter (widowed)
- Children: Reg Trotter
- Relatives: Derek Trotter (grandson); Rodney Trotter (step-grandson); Damien Trotter (great-grandson); Joan Trotter (great-granddaughter)

Edward Kitchener "Ted" Trotter, better known as Grandad, (1905–1985) is a fictional character who was one of the original leads of the BBC sitcom Only Fools and Horses. He appeared in the show's first three series, played by Lennard Pearce. The character is grandfather to Del Boy and Rodney Trotter. Pearce's death in December 1984 was written into the series with the death of Grandad. His place was taken by Uncle Albert (Buster Merryfield).

The character was portrayed by Phil Daniels in the prequel series Rock & Chips.

== Backstory ==
Grandad was born in 1905 in Peckham, to Jack Trotter and Victoria Trotter. He had three brothers, George, Jack, and Albert. Grandad stated that his earliest memories were of watching soldiers marching off to World War I and witnessing their return after the Armistice in 1918. He later spoke of the horror of these experiences with his description of the wartime government policy ("They promised us homes fit for heroes, they gave us heroes fit for homes!"). His brother George served and was at the Battle of Passchendaele. After leaving school, Grandad got a job as a decorator working for the council but was sacked after just two days for wallpapering over a serving hatch. Around this time, he married his wife Violet, and they had a son, Reg in 1924 (who was born in Bermondsey).

He then began working as a lamplighter for the London Gas Light and Coke Company, but according to Del, as electricity had already been discovered, this job did not last long. He also trained as a chef at the Ear, Nose and Throat Hospital. He also worked as a security officer at a warehouse in Kilburn, which he was sacked from after a janitor stole over 300 briefcases from under his nose. As such, he was unemployed and impoverished. Fed up with this, he and his friend Nobby Clarke ran away to Tangier to join the French Foreign Legion; however, they were unsuccessful and became gun runners during the Spanish Civil War. They were caught by the authorities. Nobby was tortured but Grandad chose to confess everything under interrogation. Both were deported from Spain and all her territories and dominions. Grandad returned to Peckham and joined the dole queues. During the Trotter's holiday to Spain in 1982, he was arrested and believed it was related to this, but it turned out he had been caught jaywalking.

During World War II, Grandad evidently served some time in the army, as he told Del he was given a double-headed coin by a fellow soldier, and his son Reg checked his blood group on his old army records, as mentioned in "Thicker than Water." During the episode "He Ain't Heavy, He's My Uncle," Uncle Albert (Buster Merryfield) shows Del a photograph of Grandad during the war. When Del asks why Grandad is wearing a vest and plimsolls, Albert answers "Well, he'd just deserted". It was most likely at this time that he had an affair with Trigger's grandmother Alice, while her husband Arthur was still fighting. According to Del's autobiography, he got caught after deserting but was let off after pleading not guilty on the terms of temporary insanity.

After the war, Grandad had various short-term jobs before he retired "at the ripe old age of forty-eight". His wife, who apparently worked as a charlady in these later years, died in the early 1960s, when Rodney was still young.

It is revealed in "Tea for Three" by Grandad's younger brother Albert, that he and Albert fell out over Albert's later wife, Ada. Albert tells Rodney that while walking home from a nightclub together, he and Grandad had a fight, and never spoke to each other again after that. Despite this, in the episode "Miami Twice", Albert mentions that he married Ada before enlisting to fight in World War II, and after the war, as revealed in "Hole in One", he and Grandad would often pull schemes on local pubs by having Albert fall down cellars without hurting himself and claiming compensation whenever they were short of money. Albert also mentions that during their youth, Grandad often looked after him, and it was for this reason that Albert regretted their falling out, attended Grandad's funeral, and even tried to swindle the brewery in order to raise money to pay for Grandad's gravestone.

== In the programme ==
The character of Grandad was written out of the original show following the death of the actor Lennard Pearce but is a main character (frequently addressed as "Ted") in the 2010-2011 prequel series Rock & Chips. Set in 1960, Grandad has separated from his wife Vi after being kicked out of his flat in Deptford, and is unemployed and subsequently homeless after she finds out about his affair with Alice Ball. Grandad then moves in with his son Reg. The Trotters are at that time squeezed into a two-up two-down terraced house and Grandad is forced to share a bedroom with his grandson Del. He appears to enjoy a close relationship with his family and remains with them when they move to their new council flat in Nelson Mandela House (which was then known as the "Sir Walter Raleigh House").

Grandad is seen in the first series of Only Fools and Horses. He is, by this point in his mid-seventies, largely infirm, and still living at Nelson Mandela House with his grandsons. He is often seen watching two television sets at once, one in black and white and one in colour. In The Second Time Around it is revealed that he would normally watch three sets, but one was being mended. Grandad's favourite television shows are Crossroads and The Dukes of Hazzard, as revealed in "Homesick" and "May The Force Be With You," and the former episode reveals that he also enjoys listening to The Archers on the radio. In "Yesterday Never Comes," Del suggests that he watches The Chinese Detective in his bedroom in order to remove him from the sitting room.

Grandad is always seen wearing a hat, even in bed.

Because of their sense of family loyalty, the Trotters ensure that he will always have a home, with Del dismissing his fiancée Pauline's suggestion of putting Grandad into a residential home because "he's family" ("The Second Time Around"). Grandad is a poor cook; his final line in the series is "Del Boy, I've burnt yer pizza!", and in the first Christmas special, he left the giblets in their plastic wrapping inside the turkey. In the first episode, when Rodney came home after a week's absence, he declined a meal cooked by Grandad despite being ravenously hungry. Del also played an April Fool's joke on Grandad, telling him that the pools had called to say that he had won £500,000. Grandad went to Soho and celebrated before remembering that he did not participate in the pools.

None of the main characters addresses Grandad by his name. Trigger addresses him as 'Mr Trotter' in Ashes to Ashes, and in "Who's a Pretty Boy?", even pet shop owner Louis greets him as 'Grandad.' This is further seen in The Russians Are Coming, when the Trotters are stopped for speeding by police sergeant Eric, who again refers to him as 'Grandad'. His name is not revealed until Rock & Chips.

When Lennard Pearce died in 1984, writer John Sullivan chose not to recast him but to write the character's death into the series. A funeral was held for Grandad in "Strained Relations", which saw the Trotter brothers trying to come to terms with the loss of a man who had been such an integral part of their lives. This episode also introduced Grandad's younger brother Uncle Albert. It is also known that apart from Albert he had two other brothers, Jack, who was mentioned by Albert in "A Royal Flush", and George, whom he mentioned had served in World War I in the episode "The Russians Are Coming". George's wife Pat/Patsy was also mentioned by Albert, as well as Del in his biography, "He Who Dares".
