= Uncle Albert =

Fictional character from Only Fools and Horses

Uncle Albert Trotter
- Only Fools and Horses character
- Portrayed by: Buster Merryfield
- Duration: 1985–1993, 1996
- First appearance: Strained Relations
- Last appearance: Time On Our Hands
- Created by: John Sullivan
In-universe information
- Occupation: Retired Royal Navy and Merchant Navy sailor
- Father: Jack Trotter Snr
- Mother: Victoria Trotter
- Brothers: Ted Trotter; George Trotter; Jack Trotter
- Sisters: Patsy Trotter
- Wife: Ada Trotter (separated)
- Sons: Numerous
- Nephews: Stan Trotter; Reg Trotter; Derek Trotter (great-nephew); Rodney Trotter (step-great-nephew); Damien Trotter (great-great-nephew)
- Nieces: Audrey Trotter; Gillian; Joan Trotter Jr. (step-great-great-niece)

Albert Gladstone Trotter, better known as Uncle Albert (19 November c. 1910s – 2001), is a fictional character in the BBC sitcom Only Fools and Horses, portrayed by Buster Merryfield. He was introduced during the fourth series as a replacement for the character of Grandad (the character's brother) due to the sudden death of Lennard Pearce in 1984.

== Fictional character biography ==
Albert was born sometime in the 1910s on Tobacco Road in Wapping, London, close to the Docks, where he lived with his brothers Edward, George, and Jack. His year of birth is not known; in The Bible of Peckham, it is stated he was born in 1920 but this was not written by John Sullivan. He was most likely born around the time of the outbreak of the First World War.

Albert joined the Royal Navy aged 17, and was called to action following the outbreak of the Second World War. He spent the rest of his life recounting tales from the war. He was awarded seven medals, although this was largely because he had an extraordinarily unfortunate time. He served on seven ships that were either torpedoed or divebombed over a period of four years, including two during peacetime. Albert undertook basic parachute training on the Isle of Wight, which enabled him to fall without injuring himself. He used this to his advantage in the post-war years, staging mock falls down the cellars of pubs in order to receive financial compensation. He staged falls down at least fifteen cellars, gaining the nickname of "The Ferret" in the process. After the war, Albert joined the Merchant Navy. In spite of his seafaring past, Albert cannot swim. He lost contact with his brother Edward because of a fight over Albert's future wife Ada to whom they were both attracted. Despite this, he attended Edward's funeral.

Uncle Albert, as he was known by his two great nephews, Del Boy and Rodney, joined the cast in 1985 during the episode Strained Relations when he attended the funeral of his older brother Ted. Shortly after the funeral, Albert was abandoned by his nephew Stan and his wife Jean, with whom he was living in their mobile home. After initial reluctance, Del agreed to let him stay. Albert was described by Del as "England's greatest sailor since Nelson lost the Armada."

It is revealed by Albert in Tea for Three, that Grandad and Albert fell out over Albert's later wife, Ada, whom they both fancied at the time. The fight ended in them both hitting each other and after that, they never spoke again. Ultimately, Albert's marriage to Ada was not an entirely happy one, and the two were estranged by the late 1960s, though never formally divorced. They had no children.

Albert was famed for telling stories that often began with the words "During the war...", which often annoyed Del and Rodney but almost always caught their interest once he started telling them the story. In Albert's final appearance in the series (Time On Our Hands, the third and final chapter of the 1996 Christmas trilogy), a frustrated Del cuts Albert off at "During th..." by threatening to pour a cup of tea over his head should he complete the sentence "During the war...". Albert restarts his anecdote with, "During the 1939-1945 conflict with Germany..."

Albert was less of a help than a hindrance; in Time on Our Hands, Albert ruins a long anticipated dinner with Raquel's parents (whom she had not spoken to for many years). After hours of preparation and worrying about the meal, and the oversized table, everything appears to be going well until Del realises that Albert has confused the jars containing coffee and gravy granules. By this time, however, it is too late; the guests have already poured coffee over their meals. Before eating, Del punishes Albert by pouring the "gravy" all over his meal. The meal is abandoned early, and Raquel goes to fetch the "coffee". In Del Boy's own words: "Not only have you managed to sink every battleship and aircraft carrier that you've ever sailed on, but now you've gone and knackered a gravy boat!"

Albert had a female companion called Elsie Partridge, who was first mentioned by Rodney in The Unlucky Winner Is..., and appeared in the episode Sickness and Wealth. His nephews often teased him about this as well as his ability to sink ships and, with his bald head and big white beard, his resemblance to Captain Birdseye.

Although Del and Rodney often teased Albert, they showed their care for him when they found out he had died in If They Could See Us Now, and they both regretted not taking him on holiday with them before he died (although Albert never held a passport). Damien, as a joke, hides Cassandra's birth control pills in Albert's urn.

Originally, the final episode of Only Fools and Horses was meant to be Who Wants to Be a Millionaire, with Del Boy leaving for Australia with new partner Jumbo Mills, Uncle Albert staying in Nelson Mandela House, and Rodney and Mickey Pearce taking over Trotters Independent Traders, but John Sullivan felt that this was not the end of the road for the Trotters. After the decision had been made, Albert was meant to be in until the final episode, Sleepless in Peckham, but, owing to Buster Merryfield's death, the script had to be changed, and Uncle Albert died before the events of If They Could See Us Now.

Reportedly, John Sullivan had intended for a younger Uncle Albert to make an appearance in the prequel series Rock and Chips in flashbacks taking place before his fallout with Grandad, but Sullivan died after writing the series' third episode, The Frog and the Pussycat.

== After Merryfield's death ==
Merryfield died on 23 June 1999 from a brain tumour. During the 2001 Christmas special, If They Could See Us Now, Cassandra takes a phone call from Elsie Partridge's son who informs them that Albert has died. Del and Rodney, who had since become millionaires, regretted not having taken him with them, but were consoled by the revelation that the Ancient Mariner never actually held a passport and at the same time showing up at the wrong funeral to someone else called Albert. In the 2002 special, Strangers on the Shore, the two scatter Albert's ashes in the English Channel, before visiting the French village where Albert had been stationed for a time during the war only to find an entire town inhabited by bald men with white beards who all bore more than a passing resemblance to their late uncle (implied to all be children of his from his sexual proclivity at the time), they joked it should have been called "Trottersville". In the 2003 special, Sleepless in Peckham, it was revealed that Albert had invested his share of the Trotter fortune in a safer area prior to his death. Coupled with his choice of a simple lifestyle, this meant Albert had around £290,000 at the time of his death, which he left to his two great nephews to invest. This was enough to save them from being evicted from Nelson Mandela House, and allow them to one day become millionaires once more.

== Medals ==
Although Albert talks about his Naval career, he wore his ribbons in every episode.

Ribbon	Medal	Date	Notes
	1939–1945 Star	8 July 1943	
	Atlantic Star		
	Arctic Star		
	Africa Star		
	Pacific Star		
	Italy Star		
	Defence Medal		
	War Medal		
