= Lennard Pearce =

English actor (1915–1984)

- Pearce as Grandad in Only Fools and Horses
- Born: Leonard Pearce; 31 October 1915; Paddington, London, England
- Died: 15 December 1984 (aged 69); Archway, London, England
- Education: Royal Academy of Dramatic Art
- Occupation: Actor
- Years active: 1930s–1984
- Television: Only Fools and Horses (1981–1984)

Leonard "Lennard" Pearce (31 October 1915 – 15 December 1984) was an English actor who worked in theatre and television. He played Grandad in the BBC television sitcom Only Fools and Horses from its first episode in 1981 until his death in December 1984.

== Early life ==
Born in Paddington as the youngest of five children, Pearce's father Sidney was killed in action during World War I, when Leonard was six months old. He trained as an actor at the Royal Academy of Dramatic Art in London.

== Career ==
=== Theatre ===
As a young actor in the 1930s, Pearce joined a performance tour in Germany. According to Nicholas Lyndhurst, one theatrical performance was attended by senior members of the Nazi Party. At the end of the show, party officials came backstage to congratulate the cast, and Pearce shook hands with Adolf Hitler. Lyndhurst claimed that Pearce said that he regretted not taking the opportunity to kill Hitler.

During World War II, Pearce performed for the Entertainments National Service Association. In the early 1960s, he understudied for Stanley Holloway as Alfred P. Doolittle in the original West End production of My Fair Lady. After 1965, he appeared in many plays at the National Theatre, including Much Ado About Nothing and Rosencrantz and Guildenstern Are Dead. He worked with both Laurence Olivier and Anthony Hopkins on stage. In 1966, Pearce starred in Richard Brinsley Sheridan's The Rivals alongside David Jason, but Pearce and Jason did not meet again until 15 years later.

In 1975, Pearce played Owl in a theatre adaptation of Winnie the Pooh at the Phoenix Theatre in London, and two years later, Mr. Witherspoon in Arsenic and Old Lace at the Westminster Theatre. He was also a member of the Royal Shakespeare Company.

=== Television ===
Pearce's television work includes Dixon of Dock Green (1965), Dr. Finlay's Casebook (1967), Sykes (1972) and Coronation Street in May 1969 and April 1977, along with The Wednesday Play ("Cathy Come Home", 1966). Pearce also appeared in an episode of Crown Court broadcast in February 1984.

In 1981, Pearce began his role as Grandad in the first three series of the BBC sitcom Only Fools and Horses. He appeared in a 1984 episode of Minder named "The Balance of Power" and played Mr. Coles in three episodes of Shroud for a Nightingale in March 1984. Pearce's last television appearance was on Children in Need, broadcast on BBC1 on 23 November 1984.

== Health problems and death ==
In 1980, while Pearce was a cast member of a play running at the Bristol Old Vic, he began to lose his balance and would frequently fall asleep. He was diagnosed with critical hypertension and was prescribed medication.

Pearce began filming the episode "Hole in One" for the fourth series of Only Fools in Horses in early December 1984, participating in two location sequences for a storyline where Grandad attempts to commit insurance fraud by falling into a pub cellar. During the following week, Pearce suffered a heart attack and was admitted to Whittington Hospital, where scriptwriter John Sullivan visited him. He died from a second heart attack on 15 December.

Filming for Only Fools and Horses, which Pearce had been due to participate in, was planned to resume the following morning. Producer Ray Butt was informed of Pearce's death by his agent and broke the news to the cast and crew on location, including costars David Jason and Nicholas Lyndhurst.

Following Pearce's death, the beginning of the fourth series was restructured and Sullivan wrote two new scripts at short notice. This included "Strained Relations", which, unusually for a comedy series at the time, featured an on-screen funeral for Grandad. Buster Merryfield was hired as the replacement character Uncle Albert.

== Filmography ==
=== Film ===
Year	Title	Role	Notes
1961	The Wind of Change	Market trader	Uncredited
1976	Face of Darkness	Edward Langdon	

=== Television ===
Year	Title	Role	Notes
1957–1958	Our Miss Pemberton	Edward Simpson	6 episodes
1959	The Case Before You	Victor Hardwick	Episode: #1.1
1964	Melissa	Detective Sergeant Heston	Episode: "Part 4"
1964	No Hiding Place	1st Ambulance man	Episode: "Aftertaste"
1958–1964	Armchair Theatre	Albert Waite Bill Brough	2 episodes
1964	Thorndyke	Shenston	Episode: "The Puzzle Lock"
1965	The Sullavan Brothers	Prison officer Gunter	Episode: "Put Them Away for Keeps"
1965	Undermind	Gregson	Episode: "Test for the Future"
1965	Blackmail	George Dickson - Night Watchman	Episode: "Kill Me"
1965	Dixon of Dock Green	Mr. Kemp	Episode: "Act of Violence"
1966	The Newcomers	Man in Courtroom	Episode: #1.75
1966	Emergency-Ward 10	Dr. Hammond, MOH	Episode: #1.936
1966	The Wednesday Play	Ratepayer	Episode: "Cathy Come Home"
1969	Market in Honey Lane	Jasper Tewkes	Episode: #3.52
1969	The First Lady	Gierson	Episode: "To Hell with Purity"
1969	Coronation Street	Mr. Bracegirdle	Episode: #1.876
1967–1969	Dr. Finlay's Casebook	Consultant John Dow Pearson	3 episodes
1970	A Family at War	Cowking	Episode: "Hope Against Hope"
1970	Nearest and Dearest	Doctor	Episode: "Make Yourself at Home"
1971	Take Three Girls	Fulton	Episode: "Coda and Resolution"
1971	Advent of Steam	Trundell	Episode: "The Iron Horse: Part 1"
1971	Under and Over	Secretary	Episode: "The Chaotic Ceilidh"
1972	Softly, Softly: Task Force	Pearson	Episode: "The Amateur"
1972	Sykes	Club Member	Episode: "Uncle"
1974	Marked Personal	Mr. Potts	2 episodes
1974	Antony and Cleopatra	Cleopatra's Schoolteacher	TV movie
1975	Zigger Zagger	Headmaster	Episode: #1.1
1976	Victorian Scandals	Detective Sergeant Simmonds	Episode: "The Fruits of Philosophy"
1976	Within These Walls	Mr. Kearny	Episode: "The Mystery"
1977	Seven Faces of Woman	Customer in pub	Episode: "She: The Barfly"
1980	Hammer House of Horror	Rector	Episode: "Witching Time"
1980	Play for Today	Patient	Episode: "Name for the Day"
1981	Second Chance	Registrar	Episode: "April II"
1981	Bless Me, Father	Clerk of the Court	Episode: "Porgy and Bess"
1981	Diamonds	Priest	Episode: "My End is my Beginning"
1982	Only Fools and Horses: Christmas Trees	Grandad Trotter (Edward "Ted" Trotter)	TV Short
1982	The Funny Side of Christmas	Grandad Trotter (Edward "Ted" Trotter)	TV movie
1981–1983	Only Fools and Horses	Grandad Trotter (Edward "Ted" Trotter)	22 episodes
1984	Miracles Take Longer	Elderly man	Episode: #2.3
1984	Crown Court	Ronald Wardle	Episode: "Mother Figures: Part 1"
1984	Shroud for a Nightingale	Mr. Coles	3 episodes
1984	Minder	George	Episode: "The Balance of Power"
1984	Only Fools and Horses: Licensed to Drill	Grandad Trotter (Edward "Ted" Trotter)	Video
