= Gunning =

Gunning or Gunnin' can refer to:

== Places ==
- Gunning, New South Wales, Australia, a town on the Old Hume Highway

== People with the surname Gunning ==
- Anne Gunning (1929–1990), Irish fashion model
- Ashleigh Gunning (born 1985), American soccer player
- Brian Gunning, Australian biologist
- Carmel Gunning, traditional Irish musician
- Charles Gunning (disambiguation), several people
- Christiaan Pieter Gunning, Dutch pedagogue and classicist
- Christopher Gunning (1944-2023), British composer
- Coral Gunning (1915–1998), Australian singer
- Dave Gunning, Canadian folk singer-songwriter
- Elizabeth Gunning (disambiguation), several people
- Gavin Gunning (born 1991), Irish footballer
- Sir George Gunning, 2nd Baronet (1763–1823), English politician
- Harry Gunning (1916–2002), Canadian scientist and administrator
- Henry Gunning (disambiguation), several people
- Hy Gunning (1888–1975), American baseball baseman
- J. W. B. Gunning (Jan Willem Boudewijn Gunning, 1860–1913), South African zoologist, grandfather of Christopher Gunning
- Jessica Gunning, British actress
- Jimmy Gunning (1929–1993), Scottish footballer
- John Gunning (disambiguation), several people
- John W. Gunning (1847–1910), American politician and businessman
- Ken Gunning (1914–1991), American basketball player and college coach
- Lisa Gunning, English film editor, director and writer
- Lucille C. Gunning (1921-2018), American pediatrician
- Lucy Gunning (born 1964), English filmmaker, installation artist, sculptor, video artist and lecturer
- Maria Gunning, later Maria Coventry, Countess of Coventry (1733–1760), English noblewoman
- Louise Gunning (1879–1960), American soprano singer
- Megan Gunning (born 1992), Canadian freestyle skier
- Michael Gunning (born 1994), Jamaican swimmer
- Oliver Gunning (born 1996), Irish cricketer
- Peter Gunning (1614–1684), English royalist church leader
- Piet Gunning (1913–1967), Dutch field hockey player
- Quirijn Gunning (born 1991), Dutch international cricketer
- Rich Gunning (born 1966), American voice actor
- Robert Gunning (disambiguation), several people
- Rosemary R. Gunning (1905–1997), New York assemblywoman
- Sarah Ogan Gunning (1910–1983), American singer and songwriter
- Susannah Gunning (c.1740–1800), British novelist
- Thomas P. Gunning (1882–1943), American dentist and politician
- Tom Gunning (1862–1931), American baseball catcher
- William Gunning (1796–1860), Archdeacon of Bath (from 1852)
- William Gunning (Gaelic footballer) (1864–1895), Irish Gaelic footballer

=== Baronetcy ===
- Gunning baronets

== People with the given name Gunning ==
- Gunning Bedford Sr. (1742–1797), American lawyer and Governor of Delaware
- Gunning Bedford Jr. (1747–1812), American lawyer and delegate to the Constitutional Convention of 1787
- Gunning S. Bedford (1806–1870), American medical writer and teacher
- Gunning Campbell

== Other uses ==
- Gunning fog index, measure of readability
- Gunning railway station
- Gunning transceiver logic, low voltage electronic signalling

== See also ==
- "Gunnin'", a song by Hedley from the 2005 album Hedley
- Gun (disambiguation)
- Gunner (disambiguation)
