= Coghill =

Coghill is a surname of Scottish origin. Following is a list of notable people with the surname Coghill:

- Ambrose Coghill (1902–1983), actor and nobleman
- Annie Louisa Walker (1836–1907), English writer who was known in later life by her married name, Anna Louisa Coghill
- Chris Coghill (born 1975), English actor and screenwriter
- Dawn Coghill, a character in the English soap opera Coronation Street
- Egerton Coghill (1853–1921), Irish baronet and painter
- George Coghill (American football) (born 1970), American professional football player
- George E. Coghill (1872–1941), American anatomist
- Hamish Coghill (1936–2025), Scottish journalist
- Several persons named John Coghill, including:
  - Jack Coghill (1925–2019), American businessman and politician
  - John Coghill (born 1950), American politician, son of Jack Coghill
  - Jon Coghill (born 1971), Australian drummer
- Joy Coghill (1926–2017), Canadian actress
- Ken Coghill (born 1944), Australian politician
- Marmaduke Coghill (1673–1738), Irish politician
- Nevill Coghill (1899–1980), English literary scholar
- Nevill Coghill (VC) (1852–1879), Irish recipient of the Victoria Cross
- Nikki Coghill (born 1964), Australian actress
- Rhoda Coghill (1903–2000), Irish musician and poet
- Yvonne Coghill (born 1958), British public servant
