= Coghill baronets of Coghill (1778) =

Escutcheon of the Coghill baronets of Coghill

The Coghill baronetcy, of Coghill in the East Riding of the County of York, was created in the Baronetage of Great Britain on 31 August 1778 for John Coghill, of Coghill Hall, Knaresborough. He had been Member of the Irish House of Commons for Belturbet. Born John Cramer, he was the eldest son of Balthazar John Cramer and his wife Judith, daughter of Brinsley Butler, 1st Viscount Lanesborough; and grandson of Oliver Cramer and his wife Hester, sister of Marmaduke Coghill, Chancellor of the Exchequer of Ireland. He succeeded in 1775 to the Coghill estates on the death of his cousin Hester, daughter and heiress of James Coghill and widow of Charles Moore, 1st Earl of Charleville. The same year he assumed by Royal licence the surname of Coghill in lieu of Cramer.

He was succeeded by his eldest son, the 2nd Baronet. He assumed the surname of Coghill in lieu of Cramer, by Royal licence in 1807. He never married.

He was succeeded by his younger brother, the 3rd Baronet, a vice-admiral in the Royal Navy. On succeeding to the title in 1817, he assumed the surname of Coghill in lieu of Cramer by Royal licence. He was succeeded by his eldest son, the 4th Baronet, High Sheriff of County Dublin in 1859.

== Cramer-Coghill, later Coghill baronets, of Coghill (1778) ==
- Sir John Cramer-Coghill, 1st Baronet (1732–1790)
- Sir John Thomas Coghill, 2nd Baronet (1766–1817)
- Sir Josiah Coghill Coghill, 3rd Baronet (1773–1850)
- Sir John Joscelyn Coghill, 4th Baronet (1826–1905)
- Sir Egerton Bushe Coghill, 5th Baronet (1853–1921)
- Sir Marmaduke Nevill Patrick Somerville Coghill, 6th Baronet (1896–1981))
- Sir Joscelyn Ambrose Cramer Coghill, 7th Baronet (1903–1983)
- Sir Egerton James Nevill Tobias "Toby" Coghill, 8th Baronet (1930–2000)
- Sir Patrick Kendal Farley Coghill, 9th Baronet (born 1960)

There is no heir to the title.

== Extended family ==
- Nevill Coghill (1852–1879), eldest son of the 4th Baronet, was posthumously awarded the Victoria Cross after his death at the Battle of Isandlwana.
- Nevill Henry Kendal Aylmer Coghill (1899–1980), second son of the 5th Baronet, was Merton Professor of English Literature at the University of Oxford.

== Notes ==
Baronetage of Great Britain
Preceded by Lloyd baronets	Cramer-Coghill baronets of Coghill; 31 August 1778	Succeeded by Taylor baronets
