= Johnny Hawkins =

English arranger, musical director, conductor and composer

Johnny Hawkins (real name John Edward Hawkins, later credited as John Hawkins) was a British arranger, conductor, musical director and composer active in France from the 1950s and the UK in the 1960s and 1970s.

Hawkins was born in Cosham, Portsmouth and educated at St John's College. He was a multi-instrumentalist. From 1953 to 1960 Hawkins was in France, composing and arranging cabaret music for the Moulin Rouge, Le Lido and La Nouvelle Ève, while backing singers such as Francis Linel on various recordings. He also arranged the orchestral parts of the musical revue Paris Mes Amours for Josephine Baker, staged by Michel de Ré at the Olympia in 1959.

From 1960 he was back in the UK arranging and conducting, touring with his orchestra (or the Johnny Hawkins Four) and arranging and acting as musical director. He worked with Cilla Black - most notably as the arranger and conductor of 'Liverpool Lullaby' in 1969 - Frank Ifield, and groups including The Shadows and The Bachelors. He was the co-owner (with Andrew Cameron Miller and Tony Hall) of the British Reflection record label and Artists Musical Productions (AMP). In the 1970s he composed and conducted library music for Bruton Music and Koka Media.

== Canterbury Tales ==
He is best remembered today for co-composing (with Richard Hill) the 1968 musical Canterbury Tales, based on Nevill Coghill's translation of Chaucer. The original show was first tried out in Oxford in 1964. Subsequently, the adapter Martin Starkie was asked to narrate settings of Coghill's translation to music composed by Hawkins and Hill for the Gabrieli Brass Ensemble. He invited them to compose the music for an expanded version of his Canterbury Tales show, which opened at the Phoenix Theatre in London on 21 March 1968, running for 2,082 performances – at the time, one of the longest runs in West End history. Hawkins and Hill shared conducting duties for the first six months of the run. The show subequently played (much less successfully) on Broadway, and in Australia and Continental Europe.

== Selected discography ==
Albums

- Smash Hits Vol. 1, Johnny Hawkins Orchestra, Mayfair MLSP 14 (1963)
- Frank Ifield: Born Free (as arranger and conductor), Columbia (EMI) 33SX 1534 (1963)
- (with Richard Hill, Martin Starkie and the Gabrieli Brass), The Canterbury Pilgrims, Polydor 582008 (1967)
- Canterbury Tales, Original London Cast Recording Decca SKL 4956 (1968)
- First Edition (The John Hawkins Orchestra With The Phoenix), President Records PTLS 1027 (1969)
- The Detectives, Regency Music Co RL 1019 (1975)
- News!!!, Regency Music Co RL 1030 (1975)
- Chivalry, Bruton Music BRO 4 (1978)
- Country Life, Bruton Music BRD 1 (1978)
- (with Richard Hill) Web Of Intrigue/Investigator, Bruton Music – BRJ 9 (1979)
- Around the World, Bruton Music BRR11 (1980)
- Israel, Bruton Music BRR 13 (1983)
- (with Eliot Cohen) The Glen Miller Orchestra (UK), Koka Media KOK 2060 (1992)
- La belle France, Music House MHS 33 (1998 KPM compilation)

EPs and Singles

- Les Printemps Perdus, Disques Vendôme VEN 5017 (1956)
- Quand Une Jolie Fille Passe, Olympic OLP 5017 (1956)
- Virginie Réno (with the Johnny Hawkins Orchestra): Par Un Matin De Juin, Ducretet Thomson – 460 V 438 (1958)
- Francis Linel (with the Johnny Hawkins Orchestra): When (Viens Rêver), Disques RGM – EP 10 134 (1958)
- Francis Linel (with the Johnny Hawkins Orchestra): J'avais Rêvé D'un Ange, Disques RGM EP 10 142 (1959)
- Serge Lenormand (with the Johnny Hawkins Orchestra): Scoubidou, Trianon 4336 (1959)
- Francis Linel (with the Johnny Hawkins Orchestra): Toi Si Jamais, Ricordi 45 1 M70 (1961)
- Theme From The Legion's Last Patrol/Wipe Out, Teenage 1.013 (1963)
- The Galactic Federation: March of the Sky People, Polydor 56093 (1966)
- Lord Sitar, Columbia – SX 6256 (1968)
- The Cape Kennedy Construction Company: First Step on the Moon, President Records PT 265 (1969)
- Jocelyne Jocya: I Have Loved Me A Man (arranged and produced by Hawkins), AMP/Reflection, CBS 4177 (1969)
- Lance D'owen: You'll Just Have To Do (arranged and produced by Hawkins), AMP/Reflection, CBS 4294 (1969)
