= John Coghill (disambiguation) =

John Coghill (John Bruce Coghill, Jr., born 1950) is an American politician, a member of the Alaska Legislature since 1999.

John Coghill may also refer to:

- John G. S. Coghill (1834–1899) British physician and medical author
- Jack Coghill (John Bruce Coghill, Sr., 1925–2019), American businessman and politician, Lieutenant Governor of Alaska 1990–1994, father of the aforementioned John Coghill
- Jon Coghill (born 1971), Australian drummer, most notably with the band Powderfinger
- John Coghill (Australian politician) (1785–1853), Scottish-born sea captain and homesteader in Australia, builder of Bedervale
- Several baronets of the Coghill baronetcies in the Baronetage of Great Britain:
  - Sir John Cramer-Coghill (1732–1790), 1st Baronet of the Coghill Baronets of Coghill
  - Sir John Thomas Coghill (1766–1817), 2nd Baronet of the Coghill Baronets of Coghill
  - Sir John Joscelyn Coghill (1826–1905), 4th Baronet of the Coghill Baronets of Coghill
  - Sir John Coghill (died 1785), 1st Baronet of the Coghill Baronets of Richings

== See also ==
- Coghill (surname)
