= Robert Gunning =

Robert Gunning may refer to:

- Sir Robert Gunning, 1st Baronet (1731–1816), British diplomat
- Robert C. Gunning (born 1931), professor of mathematics at Princeton University
- Robert Halliday Gunning (1818–1900), Scottish physician
- Robert Gunning, American businessman, creator of the Gunning fog index of readability
- Robert Gunning, musician, guitarist for The Infected
- Sir Robert Gunning, 3rd Baronet (1795–1862), of the Gunning baronets, MP for Northampton
- Sir Robert Charles Gunning, 8th Baronet (1901–1989), of the Gunning baronets

== See also ==
- Gunning (disambiguation)
