= Jessie Evans (actress) =

Welsh actress (1918–1983)

- Evans as Granny Hopkins in Coronation Street, 1974–1975
- Born: Jessie Vera Thomas; 1 August 1918; Mountain Ash, Wales, U.K.
- Died: 2 March 1983 (aged 64); Canterbury, Kent, England, U.K.
- Occupation: Actress
- Years active: 1945–1982

Jessie Evans (born Jessie Vera Thomas, 1 August 1918 – 2 March 1983) was a Welsh actress. She was given her first roles by the playwright and actor Emlyn Williams and between 1945 and 1982 she appeared on stage and in broadcasts with performers including Richard Burton, John Gielgud, Edward Hardwicke, Phyllida Law, Peter O'Toole, Eric Porter, Cyril Ritchard and Harry Secombe.

Although she played many serious roles – her own favourite among them being the title role in Berthold Brecht's Mother Courage, she was most often associated with comedy, in which she played in a wide range of roles, including Madame Arcati and later Elvira in Blithe Spirit, Mrs Levi in The Matchmaker, Mrs Bardell in the musical Pickwick, Mrs Malaprop in The Rivals, Mrs Hardcastle in She Stoops to Conquer and Lady Wishfort in The Way of the World. Her most successful role was the Wife of Bath in Canterbury Tales, a musical dramatisation of Chaucer's stories, in which she starred in 1968–1969, 1970–1973 and 1979.

Evans made few cinema films, but was a frequent broadcaster on radio and television, including a BBC sitcom series, Lill, in which she starred in the title role.

== Life and career ==
=== Early years ===
Jessie Evans was born in Mountain Ash, South Wales on 1 August 1918, the second child of James Thomas – a coal miner – and his wife Ellen Beatrice (née Eynon). She was educated in Swansea and became a hospital nurse before entering the theatrical profession. She saw a press advertisement seeking a Welsh actress and being, as The Stage put it, the most Welsh of women, she applied. The advertiser was the playwright Emlyn Williams, who signed her up for his new play Pen Don, which had an entirely Welsh theme and setting. It opened at the Grand Theatre, Blackpool in December 1943, with Evans in the role of Clog.

From February 1944, Evans toured in the Middle East with Williams's company playing Madame Arcati in Blithe Spirit, Dora in Night Must Fall. and Bessie Watty in The Corn is Green. The Stage later commented that this range of contrasting roles showed the versatility that was to become her trademark. She first worked in London as stage-manager at the St James's Theatre for The Wind of Heaven in April 1945, and made her West End stage début in September of that year, playing Tina in A Bell for Adano at the Phoenix Theatre.

=== West End and Broadway ===
In the summer of 1946, Evans joined John Gielgud's company in Manchester and then at the New Theatre in London, playing Nastasia to Gielgud's Raskolnikoff in Rodney Ackland's dramatisation of Crime and Punishment. He took a company to New York in 1947, and Evans first appeared on Broadway at the Royale in May 1947, as Miss Prue in Love for Love in a cast headed by Gielgud and including Cyril Ritchard, Pamela Brown, Robert Flemyng and Donald Bain – an actor whom Evans married nine years later.

The Stage reported that Evans was acclaimed for her portrayal of Miss Hoyden in The Relapse at the Lyric, Hammersmith in December 1947. and the Phoenix in January 1948. After this, she joined the company of the Bristol Old Vic, playing among other parts, Audrey in As You Like It, and Dorine in Tartuffe, reprising the latter role at the Lyric, Hammersmith in June 1950. Following a variety of roles in London and with provincial companies, Evans toured in Continental Europe in 1954 as Elvira in Blithe Spirit, appearing in Geneva, Berne and Montreux. After this, she joined the company of the Library Theatre in Manchester, playing the title role in Bernard Shaw's Saint Joan, heading a cast that also included Jeremy Brett, David Scase, Robert Stephens and Frank Windsor. The Manchester Guardian said that Evans "makes it a memorable evening ... she commands the stage as a saint should, though the smallest person on it, by a controlled force of personality – with substantial aid, of course, from the playwright".

At the Bristol Old Vic in September 1955. Evans played Mrs Levi in The Matchmaker. The cast included Eric Porter, Alan Dobie, Edward Hardwicke, Phyllida Law and, in a tiny role the young Peter O'Toole, but The Stage declared Evans "The star of the evening [who] bursts on to the stage with all the magnificence and bravado of supremely confident I womanhood, and sorts out the tangled love affairs with superb ease". At the New in May 1956 Evans played Sidonie in Peter Hall's production of Gigi.

=== Retirement and return ===
After her marriage to Bain in 1956, Evans temporarily retired from the stage to bring up their children, Adam and Imogen. She returned in 1960, playing Miriam Norton in Gwyn Thomas's comic portrayal of Welsh life, The Keep, at the Royal Court Theatre. The production transferred to the Piccadilly Theatre in March 1962, and Evans won a Clarence Derwent Award for her performance.

At the Saville Theatre in July 1963, Evans played Mrs Bardell to Harry Secombe's Samuel Pickwick in Pickwick. For the Welsh Theatre Company in July 1964, she played Mrs Malaprop in The Rivals. The Stage commented that she "gave a marvellous lift to the almost zany humour of Mrs Malaprop by her swaggering exaggerated manner and facial grimaces as she produced each one of her distorted phrases".

Although her own favourite among her parts was the title role in Berthold Brecht's Mother Courage, she was particularly associated with comedy, and in March 1968, she played the Wife of Bath in Canterbury Tales, a musical dramatisation of Chaucer's stories, with the 14th-century text modernised by Nevill Coghill. The Stage called this "her greatest triumph". After a year in the long-running piece, she left the cast and played the title role in The Killing of Sister George at the Marlowe Theatre, Canterbury. She resumed the role of the Wife of Bath in 1970 and played it for the three remaining years of the run, and reprised it when the piece was revived in London in 1979.

Evans's later roles included Mrs Hardcastle in She Stoops to Conquer (Bristol Old Vic, 1974), Lady Wishfort in The Way of the World (Yvonne Arnaud Theatre, Guildford, 1975 and Mrs O'Dare in Irene (Adelphi, 1976) – the last, according to The Stage, the heroine's "very funny, very lovable and exceedingly Irish mother". She made her final stage appearance at the Duke of York's Theatre in its Dylan Thomas Memorial on St David's Day, 1982.

=== Radio and television ===
Evans made few cinema films, but loved radio and television. Her radio roles ranged from Bessie in The Corn Is Green (with Richard Burton, 1945) and Gwen in Dick Barton, Special Agent (1949) to Marie Lloyd in Trottie True (1955) and Miss Mowcher in David Copperfield (1974).

On television, her many appearances included Maria in Twelfth Night (1950), Miss Hoyden in The Relapse (1954), and Lill (1965), a BBC television series of situation comedies set in a small town in South Wales, in which she stars in the title role. She was also seen in Z Cars (1968 and 1972), as Granny Hopkins in Coronation Street (1974–1975) and as Mrs Beavis in Fanny by Gaslight (1981).

== Death ==
Evans died in a hospice in Canterbury at the age of 64. A commemorative service was held in St Paul's, Covent Garden – known as "the actors' church" – the following month.

== Sources ==
- Herbert, Ian, ed. (1977). Who's Who in the Theatre (sixteenth ed.). London and Detroit: Pitman Publishing and Gale Research. ISBN 978-0-273-00163-8.
