= Ambrose Coghill =

Anglo-Irish actor and aristocrat

Joscelyn Ambrose Cramer Coghill
- Born: Joscelyn Ambrose Cramer Coghill; 13 September 1902; Skibbereen in County Cork in Ireland.
- Died: 6 June 1983 (aged 80); Aberlour in Moray, Scotland
- Education: Haileybury College

Sir Joscelyn Ambrose Cramer Coghill, 7th Baronet (13 September 1902 – 6 June 1983) was an Anglo-Irish actor and aristocrat, being the 7th Baronet of Coghill (1778) (1981–1983).

He was born in Skibbereen in County Cork in Ireland in 1902, the youngest of three sons of Elizabeth Hildegarde Augusta née Somerville (1867–1954) and the Irish painter Sir Egerton Bushe Coghill, 5th Baronet Coghill (1853–1921). He was the nephew of Zulu War Victoria Cross recipient Nevill Coghill and the cousin of the Irish novelist Edith Anna Somerville. Coghill was educated at Haileybury College in Hertfordshire following which he was commissioned as a second lieutenant in the South Wales Borderers (in which his late uncle had famously served in the Zulu War in 1879) and served with the East African Civil Service. With others he set up a business in Kenya, Colonial Amusements, but the partnership was dissolved in 1935. Coghill served in the Royal Naval Volunteer Reserve during World War II gaining the rank of lieutenant-commander. He acted as an Administration Officer in London for the United Nations (1945–1946) and was Chief Secretary of the Allied Secretariat, Control Commission for Germany (1947–1950) in Berlin in Germany.

His acting roles included: Avarice in the film Doctor Faustus (1967), written and co-directed by his brother Nevill Coghill (1899–1980); Lt. Col. Douglas in the film The Charge of the Light Brigade (1968); Colonel in Whistle and I'll Come to You (1968); His Father (uncredited) in Oh! What a Lovely War (1969); Cochefer in The Elusive Pimpernel (1969); Alderman in Canterbury Tales (1969); Colonel in "The Hunting of Lionel Crane" episode of The Wednesday Play (1970); Museum Curator in The Stalls of Barchester (1971), and Daniels in Six Days of Justice (1972).

He married Elizabeth Gwendoline Atkins (1903–1980) on 7 August 1926 with whom he had two children: Faith Patricia Elizabeth Coghill (1928–2016) and Sir Egerton James Nevill Tobias Coghill, 8th Baronet Coghill, (1930–2000). The couple adopted Isabelle Edith Coghill (born 1945). He and his wife divorced in 1949. Secondly, he married Louise Fernande Berdonneau (1927–1978) on 4 July 1949, with whom he had four children: Bridget Olivia Françoise Coghill (born 1949); Christopher Michael Jerome Coghill (1950–1951); Jocelyn Edith Louise Coghill (1952–1983), and Deborah Katherine Hildegrade Coghill (born 1954). On the death of his two elder brothers, including Lieutenant Sir Marmaduke Nevile Patrick Somerville Coghill, the 6th Baronet Coghill (1896–1981) and the academic and writer Nevill Coghill, he briefly inherited the Coghill baronetcy until his own death in 1983, after which the title passed to his son, Sir Egerton James Nevill Tobias "Toby" Coghill, the 8th Baronet Coghill (1930–2000).

Ambrose Coghill died in 1983 aged 80 in Aberlour in Moray, Scotland.

== Filmography ==
Year	Title	Role	Notes
1967	Doctor Faustus	Avarice	
1968	The Charge of the Light Brigade	Lt. Col. Douglas	
1969	Oh! What a Lovely War	His Father	Uncredited

Baronetage of Great Britain
Preceded by Marmaduke Coghill	Baronet (of Coghill); 1981–1983	Succeeded by Egerton Tobias Coghill
