= Drumcondra House =

Palladian mansion in Dublin, Ireland

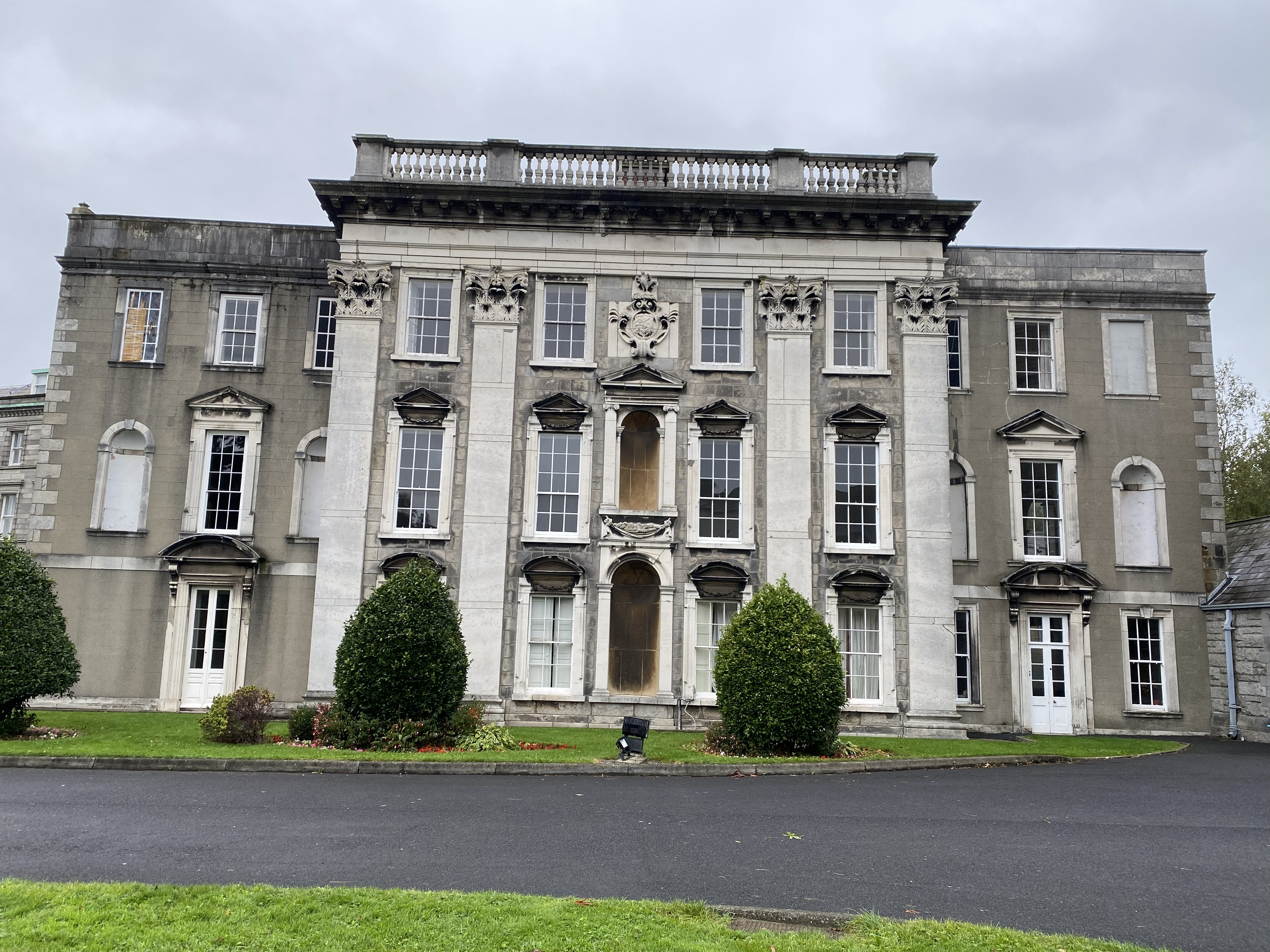
- Drumcondra House facade in September 2023
- Interactive map of the Drumcondra House area
- Alternative names: Woodlock Hall

General information
- Status: University administrative building
- Type: House
- Architectural style: Palladian
- Location: Grace Park Road, Drumcondra, Dublin 9, Dublin, Ireland
- Coordinates: 53°22′16″N 6°14′57″W
- Construction started: 1710
- Renovated: 1726-27 (South facade)

Technical details
- Floor count: 3

Design and construction
- Architects: Edward Lovett Pearce (1727), Alessandro Galilei
- Developer: Marmaduke Coghill

Drumcondra House is a Georgian house with gardens in Drumcondra, Dublin, Ireland which as of 2022 forms part of DCU's All Hallows Campus, having been part of All Hallows College. It was designed by the architects Sir Edward Lovett Pearce and Alessandro Galilei and was built around 1726 for Marmaduke Coghill, who had originally lived in Belvidere House, which now forms part of DCU's St Patrick's Campus.

== History ==
The lands on which the house were built formed part of the holdings of the Priory of All Hallows until the dissolution of the monasteries. The area around the house later came into the ownership of the Coghill family. Marmaduke Coghill built Drumcondra House near to his the family's older residence at Belvidere House, Drumcondra sometime around the year 1710. He lived there with his sister Mary until his death in 1738; the house was renowned for its gardens.

Close by Drumcondra Church (formerly Clonturk parish) was built by Mary Coghill and contains a statue to her brother Marmaduke by the Flemish sculptor Peter Scheemakers. On her death in 1755, the house was left to their niece Hester Coghill, daughter of Marmaduke's brother James. Drumcondra House became the residence of Charles Moore, 1st Earl of Charleville, following his marriage to Hester in 1737. Following Moore's death in 1764, she remarried a second husband Major John Mayne, who assumed the name of Coghill, and was created a baronet, Sir John Coghill, 1st Baronet of Richings.

The house was then leased from Hester, Countess of Charleville to Alexander Kirkpatrick, a Scottish linen merchant, a former Sheriff of Dublin City in 1783 and governor of the Bank of Ireland. On his death in August 1791 the lease reverted to the Coghill family once again. The Countess had died in 1789 with most of her estates going to her nephew. Drumcondra House was however left to Sir John Thomas Coghill, 2nd Baronet (1766–1817).

In the early 1800s, John Claudius Beresford lived for a period at the house following his financial difficulties which resulted in a move from his property at 9 Buckingham Street.

Sir Guy Campbell and Lady Campbell, daughter of Lord Edward FitzGerald, were the last residents in the house under the ownership of the Coghill family.

In 1842 Drumcondra House was rented by a Catholic priest named Father John Hand who went on to found a seminary All Hallows College there, which was run by the Vincentian order which is now a college of Dublin City University. £100 was donated towards the site by Lord Mayor of Dublin, Daniel O'Connell. He was buried in the temple in the grounds after his death.

== Building ==
The main house is an eleven-bay three-storey building and appears to have been built sometime after 1710. Edward Lovett Pearce is said to have added the southern face around 1726-27 while Allesandro Gallilei likely also had some input. The later elements include the striking Portland stone features including corinthian pilasters and platband which contrast with other darker calp stone and granite used in construction.

The house originally also contained fine furniture, some of which may also have been designed by Lovett Pearce.

=== Temple ===
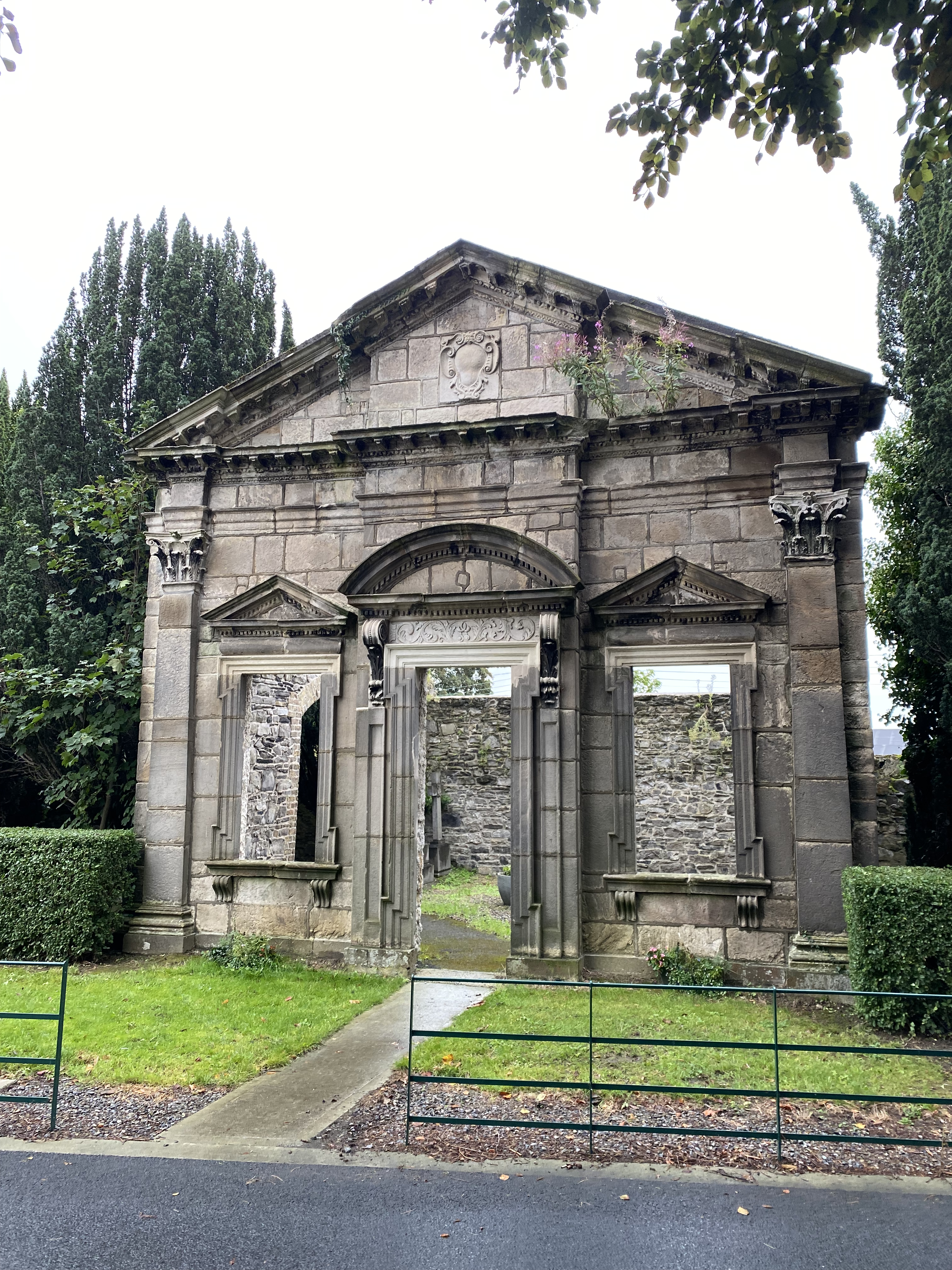
Drumcondra House temple folly in September 2023.

A temple folly in the grounds of the house was also likely designed by Alessandro Galilei and was constructed around 1730.
