= Martin Starkie =

British actor, writer and director (1922–2010)

- Born: 25 November 1922; Burnley, Lancashire, UK
- Died: 5 November 2010 (aged 87); London, UK
- Education: Exeter College, Oxford
- Occupations: Actor; writer; director

Martin Starkie (25 November 1922 – 5 November 2010) was an English actor, writer and director for theatre, radio and television. The Oxford University Poetry Society administers the annual Martin Starkie Prize in his honour.

== Early life ==
Martin Starkie was born in Burnley and educated at Burnley Grammar School and Exeter College, Oxford, under critic Nevill Coghill. In 1946, Starkie founded the Oxford University Poetry Society, and with Roy McNab edited the Oxford Poetry magazine in 1947.

== Career ==
He made his name in the BBC's The Third Programme and on television in the 1950s. He went on to write with Nevill Coghill and composers Richard Hill and John Hawkins, and to produce and direct the musical Canterbury Tales, based on Coghill's translation of the original collection of stories, first in Oxford, then in London's West End, on Broadway and in Australia.

In 1986, he founded the Chaucer Festival, which ran annual events in Southwark and London for a number of years, and later set up the Chaucer Centre in Canterbury. He is represented, as the character of Geoffrey Chaucer, by a bas-relief image on the plinth of the Chaucer statue in Canterbury which is situated at the junction of Best Lane and the High Street.

At the time of his death, Starkie was living at Horbury Villa, 85 Ladbroke Road, Notting Hill, London.
