= Alessandro Galilei =

Florentine architect (1691–1737)

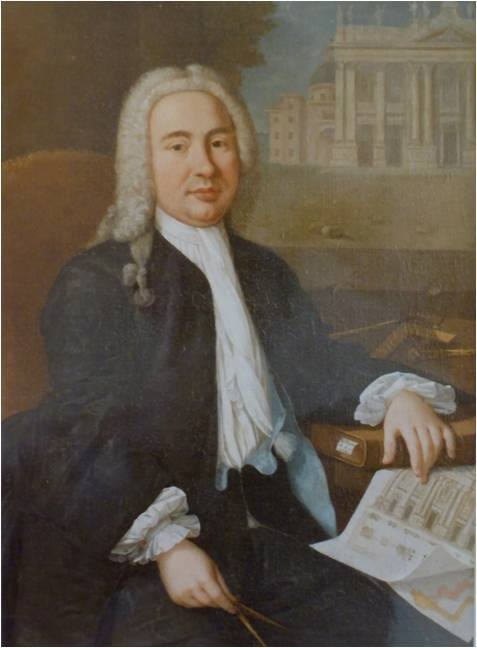
- Born: 25 August 1691; Florence, Grand Duchy of Tuscany
- Died: 21 December 1737 (aged 46); Rome, Papal States
- Scientific career
- Fields: Architecture, mathematics

Alessandro Maria Gaetano Galilei (25 August 1691 – 21 December 1737) was an Italian mathematician, architect and theorist, and a distant relative of Galileo Galilei.

== Biography ==
Born in Florence to the patrician Galilei family, he received architectural and engineering training from Antonio Maria Ferri, an outstanding figure of the Accademia dei Nobili, who lectured and wrote a treatise on perspective, fortifications and artillery. With him young Galilei worked on the study of building techniques, stereometry, hydraulics.

=== Visit to England ===
Visiting English milords were impressed with the classicism of his early designs, and he was invited by a party of English to London in 1714. There he participated in a variety of architectural projects, most notably collaborating with the civic engineer Nicholas Dubois. The only other notable Italian architect in London at the time was Giacomo Leoni. The two architects shared a classicising bent that appealed to the English but was at odds with current Baroque architectural practice in Italy. Nevertheless, aside from a funerary monument, no major commissions were forthcoming.

=== Visit to Ireland ===
In May 1717, Robert, Viscount Molesworth wrote to his wife Letitia that 'I will carry with me the best architect in Europe'. He later brought Galilei to Ireland in 1718 for approximately 6 months. There, when William Conolly, Speaker of the Irish House of Commons and the richest man in Ireland was just beginning to build Castletown House, near Dublin in County Kildare, he met Galilei. Galilei designed the façade of the main block of Castletown, the grandest Palladian house in Ireland, but returned to Italy in 1719 and was not associated with the actual construction of the house, which was begun in 1722 and carried through by the young Anglo-Irish architect Edward Lovett Pearce, who met Galilei in Florence while he was making drawings of Palladio's villas on his tour of Italy. and would introduce Neo-Palladian architecture in Ireland. A portrait of Galilei by Giuseppe Berti, signed and dated 1735, has recently been purchased for Castletown House. He returned to England later in the year.

=== Return to Florence ===
Once more in Florence after 1719, Galilei was appointed Ingegnere delle fortezze e fabbriche di corte ("Engineer of court buildings and fortresses") of the Grand Dukes of Tuscany, Cosimo III and Gian Gastone de' Medici, last of the Medici grand dukes, neither of whom, however, could provide him with architectural projects suited to his talents. Galilei's projects during this period included a renovation of the choir of Cortona Cathedral that featured a severely classical triumphal arch motif, additions to the Villa Venuti, at Catrosse, near Cortona, for Domenico Girolamo Venuti, and a design (1724) for the oratory of the Church of the Madonna del Vivaio (since rebuilt) in Scarperia, Tuscany.

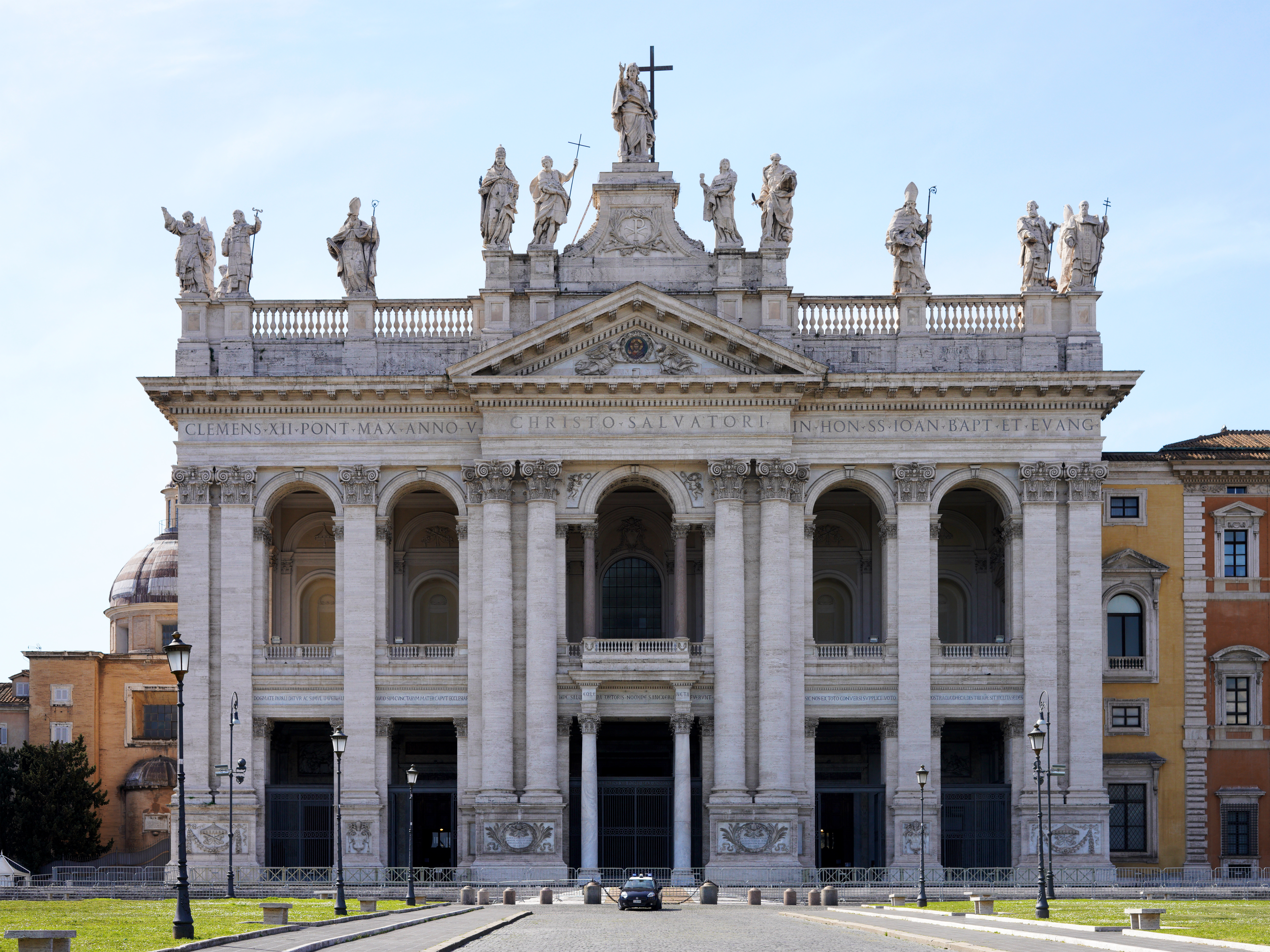
Galilei's façade of St. John Lateran, Rome, 1733–35.

In 1730 the Florentine patrician Lorenzo Corsini was elected as Pope Clement XII and called Galilei to Rome in 1731 to build his family's chapel, the Cappella Corsini in the Basilica di San Giovanni in Laterano (completed 1732). During the next six years, Galilei created all of his most notable works, which were executed in a Classical, anti-Baroque style. The most notable of these was the façade of San Giovanni in Laterano, a commission awarded after a competition (1733–1736). The monumental severity and palace character of the façade caused a scandal in Roman artistic circles but was admired later in the century by French and British neoclassicists.

Galilei also built the more conventionally Baroque façade for San Giovanni dei Fiorentini (1734), where the cornice between lower and upper stages breaks forward at center and ends, and niches between engaged Corinthian columns and sculptural detail all provide the Baroque light-and-shade.

He died in Rome.

== Notable works ==
=== Ireland ===
- Drumcondra House, Dublin (1727) - likely had some input into the design of the south facade and temple folly
- Castletown House, County Kildare (1718) - drawings which were later partially executed by Edward Lovett Pearce.
- St. Werburgh's Church, Dublin (1715) - designed a church for the site without a tower, elements of this design were later incorporated into the finished building
- St. Ann's Church, Dawson Street (1719) - completed drawings of a proposed entrance elevation for the church which were later completed by Isaac Wills of Thomas Burgh's office

=== Italy ===
- San Giovanni dei Fiorentini (1734) - baroque facade
- St. John Lateran, Rome (1735)
