= Belvidere House, Drumcondra =

Belvidere House
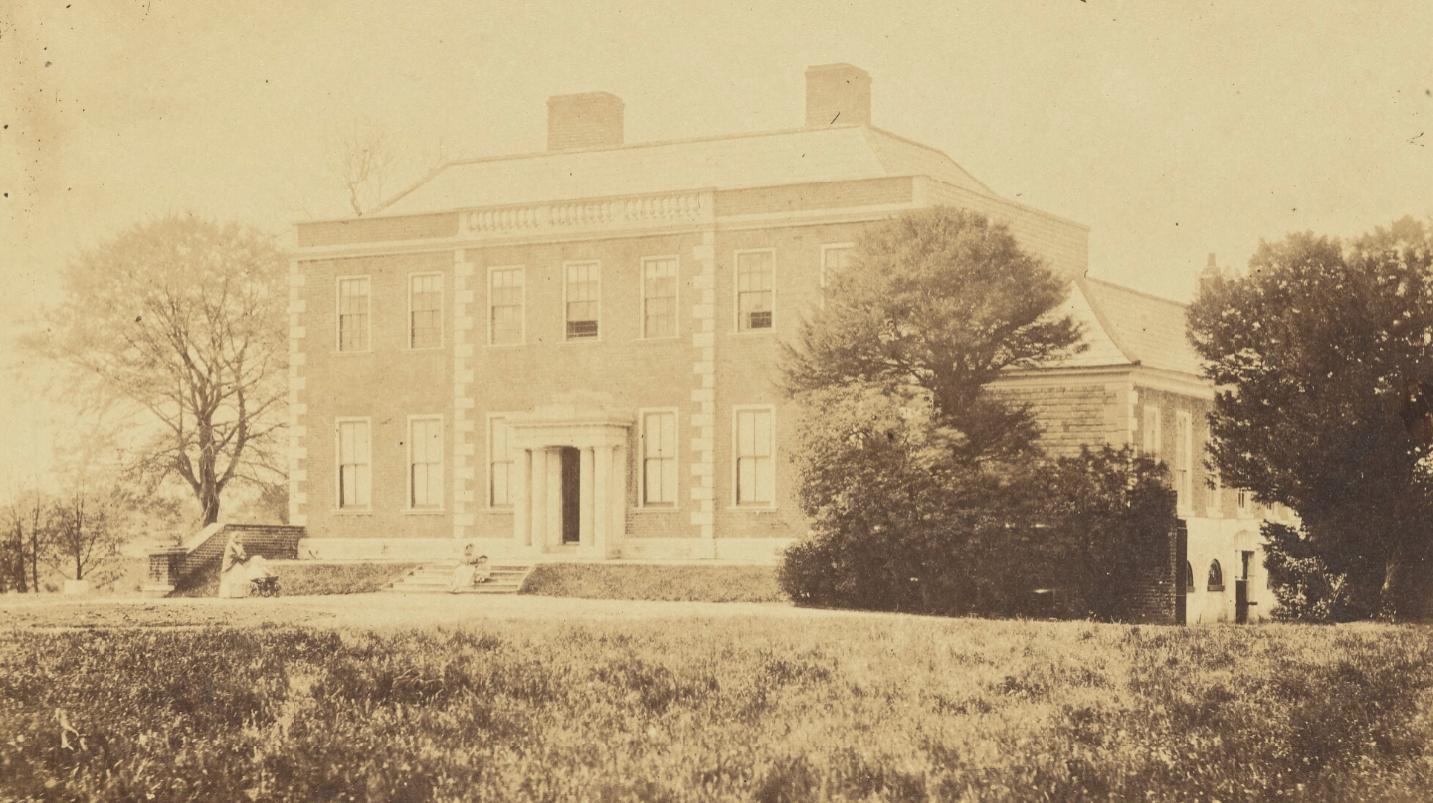
- Belvidere House in the 1850s
- Alternative names: Belvedere House

General information
- Status: Private dwelling house
- Type: House
- Architectural style: Georgian
- Location: Dublin, Ireland
- Coordinates: 53.37131°N 6.25497°W
- Estimated completion: 1750

Technical details
- Material: red brick, granite quoins
- Floor count: 2 over basement

Design and construction
- Developer: Henry Singleton (1730–50)

Belvidere House in Drumcondra, Dublin is a historic house now located within the grounds of St Patrick's College, Dublin, a constituent college of Dublin City University.

The house was constructed in its original form around 1660 for Robert Booth, Lord Chief Justice of Ireland and was described at that time as being Jacobean in form. It is situated at the highest point in the area overlooking the city of Dublin.

A larger Georgian structure was built on the site of the house at some stage between 1737 and 1750 by Henry Singleton and it is largely this structure which is still standing as of 2024.

The house is also known for having the earliest still extant Rococo stuccowork in Dublin.

== History ==
A large house was originally constructed on the site around 1660 for Robert Booth, Lord Chief Justice of Ireland, which was rated at that time for eleven hearths. An earlier, more modest house is also mentioned in the civil survey of 1654–56 where it was said to be only rated for three hearths. Booth occupied the house until his death in 1681.

The house was owned and occupied by Sir John Coghill from 1681, who first named it Belvedere, changing the name from the Irish Drishogue, which was the name of the townland in which the house was located. Later, it was occupied by his son, Marmaduke Coghill, on his death in 1699. It is likely that in the years from 1681 to 1690, the new Jacobean house was built on the site.

Later, the grander Drumcondra House was built for Marmaduke Coghill nearby in 1726 and Drumcondra appears to have been occupied by his brother Dr James Coghill for a period. Marmaduke died of gout in 1739 and was buried in the family vault in St Andrew's Church.

=== Henry Singleton residence ===
From 1737, the house was leased to Henry Singleton who lived there through his retirement right up until his death unmarried in 1759. It was during this period that the house took on its current form with substantial refurbishments and rebuilding of the main house as well as extensive works to the formal gardens and grounds.

=== Lord Bowes residence ===
From 1759, the house was occupied by John Bowes, 1st Baron Bowes. Bowes is detailed as hosting the Lord Lieutenant, George Montagu-Dunk, 2nd Earl of Halifax, at the house in the spring of 1762, and resided there until his death in July 1767.

=== Viscount Lifford residence ===
The house was then occupied by James Hewitt, 1st Viscount Lifford, from around 1771, moving from Henrietta Street and Sackville Street although it is said he never much cared for the home and moved to Stillorgan Park House in Stillorgan for his remaining years from around 1780.

=== Baron Rokeby residence ===
The house was then owned by Richard Robinson, 1st Baron Rokeby, as his Dublin residence for a period.

=== Robert Fowler residence ===
In 1790, the house was occupied by the archbishop of Dublin Robert Fowler and work is recorded as being carried out on the house at this time by Bryan Bolger and Thomas Sherrard.

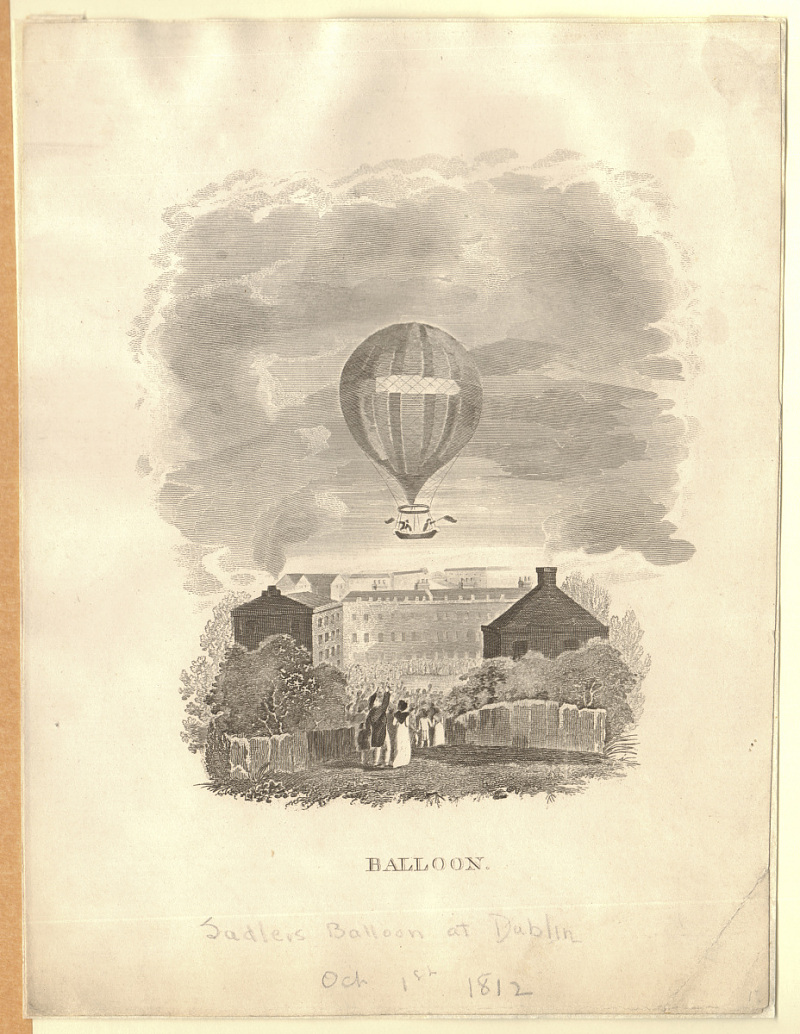
Sadler's Balloon at Dublin, October 1st, 1812

In 1812, James Sadler launched a balloon from the grounds of the house in an attempt to cross the Irish sea but was ultimately forced down in the Irish sea and nearly drowned before he was rescued.

=== Return to Coghill family usage ===
The house was occupied by Sir Josiah Coghill, 3rd Baronet and his son, the well-known photographer Sir John Joscelyn Coghill, 4th Baronet as well as other members of the Coghill family including Nevill Coghill (VC) for much of the 19th century until around 1870. At that point, nearby Drumcondra House was no longer in use as the primary Coghill residence and was ultimately sold on for use by the Roman Catholic diocese from around 1842 onwards.

=== Conversion to educational buildings ===
The house was then owned and occupied for a number of years by the Congregation of Christian Brothers. It was then acquired by Cardinal Paul Cullen in 1875 for the purposes of housing St Patrick's College. The Christian Brothers later acquired a new compound at Marino House and demesne in 1881.

After that point it was occupied for a period by William Walsh, Roman Catholic archbishop of Dublin and works are recorded as carried out on the house at this time by architect John Loftus Robinson between 1884 and 1894.
