= Henry Gunning (disambiguation) =

Henry Gunning was senior Esquire Bedell (ceremonial officer) of the University of Cambridge.

Henry Gunning is also the name of:

- Henry C. Gunning (1901–1991), Canadian geologist and academic
- Sir Henry John Gunning (1797–1885), 4th of the Gunning baronets

== See also ==
- Harry Gunning (1916–2002), scientist
