= John Gunning =

John Gunning may refer to:

- John Gunning (surgeon) (1734–1798), English surgeon
- John W. Gunning (1847–1910), American businessman, mechanic, and politician
- John Gunning (journalist), Irish sports journalist
