= Andreas Teuber =

American academic (1942–2021)

Andreas Teuber (May 5, 1942 – February 15, 2021) was an American academic and actor. He was an Associate Professor of Philosophy at Brandeis University.

Teuber studied under Paul Grice at Oxford University and at Harvard University with philosophers John Rawls and Robert Nozick. Teuber was also a Member and Fellow of the Institute for Advanced Study in Princeton, New Jersey.

In an earlier career, Teuber was an actor. As an Oxford University student, he performed opposite Richard Burton and Elizabeth Taylor in the 1967 film Doctor Faustus, where he garnered favorable reviews as Mephistopheles in a production that saw few good marks. He also guest-starred on the TV series I Spy and The Big Valley.

He died in February 2021 at the age of 78.

== Academic work ==
Teuber held a B.A. and a Ph.D. from Harvard University.

He has published a number of more general popular works, including:

- Teuber, Andreas. Twenty One Legal Puzzlers: A Series of Short Takes and Murder Mysteries in Criminal, Civil and Constitutional Law Complete with Commentaries. Focus Publishing, 2005.
- Teuber, Andreas. "Christopher Marlowe's Dr. Faustus in Performance." Shakespeare and the Classroom XIII. 1 (2005).
- Teuber, Andreas. "Dr. Faustus on Stage and Film." Marlowe's Dr. Faustus. Ed. Lake, James & Ribner, Irving. Pullins and Company, 2004
