= Canterbury Tales (musical) =

1964 musical

- The Musical
- Logo
- Music: John Hawkins; Richard Hill
- Lyrics: Nevill Coghill
- Book: Martin Starkie; Nevill Coghill
- Basis: The Canterbury Tales by Geoffrey Chaucer
- Productions: 1968 West End

Canterbury Tales is a British musical based on Chaucer's fourteenth-century collection of stories published under the same title. The show was first given in Oxford in 1964 and subsequently presented in the West End, on Broadway and in Australia and Continental Europe. It was conceived by the actor and director Martin Starkie and co-written with Nevill Coghill, whose modern-English translation of Chaucer's original had been published in 1951. The music was by John Hawkins and Richard Hill.

The first London production ran for 2,082 performances – at the time, one of the longest runs in West End history. There have been a few revivals since the original productions. A sequel, presented in 1979, failed.

== Background ==
In 1951 Nevill Coghill, a don at Exeter College, Oxford, published a version of The Canterbury Tales translated into modern English from Chaucer's Middle English original. The critic Philip Hope-Wallace wrote that Coghill showed "how much sheer human fun and literary merriment" could be had from this accessible version, and Punch, comparing it to "having a heap of gold poured into one's lap", said, "this translation will remain a beloved classic until the language changes again sufficiently to call for another renaissance".

Among Coghill's students at Exeter was Martin Starkie, who became an actor and director. He conceived the idea of dramatising some of the tales, using Coghill's translation. This was done and the resulting play was successfully staged at the Oxford Playhouse. Later, Starkie was invited to speak words from Coghill's version of the Prologue to music composed by Richard Hill and John Hawkins and played by the Gabrieli Brass Ensemble. Starkie and Coghill then invited the two composers to write music for their existing play, with lyrics newly written by Coghill.

== Premieres ==
The musical version was first given at the Oxford Playhouse on 29 October 1964 by the John Ford Society as part of the celebrations marking the 650th anniversary of Exeter College. Starkie played Chaucer and Dick Durden-Smith was the Host.

The show was expanded into a full-length musical and presented at the Phoenix Theatre, London on 21 March 1968, with Wilfrid Brambell, Jessie Evans, James Ottaway, Trevor Baxter and Nicky Henson heading the cast. It played for 2,082 performances – at the time, one of the longest runs in West End history. (Note: At the time, the only West End musicals that had longer runs were: Oliver! (1960, 2,618 performances), The Sound of Music (1961, 2,386 performances), Salad Days (1954. 2,283 performances), My Fair Lady (1958, 2.281 performances), Chu Chin Chow (1916, 2,238 performances) and Charlie Girl (1965, 2,202 performances).) A studio recording of the musical numbers made by the cast for Decca was issued on LP and has been reissued on CD. There is also a Broadway cast recording, with musical direction by Oscar Kosarin.

The Broadway premiere was at the Eugene O'Neill Theater on 3 February 1969. The critic Clive Barnes praised the three stars, Martyn Green, George Rose and Hermione Baddeley, but found the cast and the production as a whole inferior to those seen in London. The New York production ran for 121 performances. The show was a considerable success in Australia, where it opened at the Comedy Theatre, Melbourne on 16 August 1969. Productions followed in cities in Continental Europe, including Budapest, Prague, Munich and Vienna.

== Original casts ==
	London, March 1968	New York, February 1969
Chaucer	James Ottaway	Martyn Green
Host	Michael Logan	Edwin Steffe
Knight	Trevor Baxter	Reid Shelton
Squire	Nicky Henson	Ed Evanko
Prioress	Pamela Charles	Ann Gardner
Nun	Nancy Nevinson	Evelyn Page
Priest	Daniel Thorndike	Garnett Smith
Cook	John Ruttand	David Thomas
Friar	George Raistrick	Dick Ensslen
Wife of Bath	Jessie Evans	Hermione Baddeley
Miller	Kenneth J. Warren	Roy Cooper
Steward	Wilfrid Brambell	George Rose
Clerk of Oxford	Billy Boyle	Bruce Hyde
Summoner	John Rutland	Bert Michaels
Pardoner	Daniel Thorndike	Garnett Smith
Merchant	Kevin Brennan	Leon Shaw
The Miller's Tale
Nicholas	Nicky Henson	Ed Evanko
Alison	Gay Soper	Sandy Duncan
The Carpenter	Wilfrid Brambell	George Rose
Absalon	Billy Boyle	Bruce Hyde
Gervase	Kenneth J. Warren	Roy Cooper
Robin	Julian Grant	Terry Eno
The Steward's [Reeve's] Tale
Miller	Kenneth J. Warren	Roy Cooper
Miller's Wife	Nancy Nevinson	Evelyn Page
Molly	Gay Soper	Sandy Duncan
Alan	Nicky Henson	Ed Evanko
John	Billy Boyle	Bruce Hyde
The Merchant's Tale
January	Wilfrid Brambell	George Rose
Justinus	Daniel Thorndike	Martyn Green
Placebo	John Rutland	Garnett Smith
May	Gay Soper	Sandy Duncan
Damian	Nicky Henson	Ed Evanko
Pluto	Kenneth J. Warren	Roy Cooper
Proserpina	Pamela Charles	Ann Gardner
Duenna	Nancy Nevinton	Evelyn Page
Page	Marc Arnall	Tod Miller
The Wife of Bath's Tale
King	Trevor Baxter	Reid Shelton
Queen	Pamela Charles	Ann Gardner
Old Woman	Jessie Evans	Hermione Baddeley
Young Knight	Billy Boyle	Bruce Hyde

Source: The Stage and Internet Broadway Database.

== Numbers ==
- Overture
- Welcome – Host
- Goodnight Hymn – Company
- Canterbury Day – Company
- I Have A Noble Cock – Nicholas
- Darling, Let Me Teach You How to Kiss – Absalon
- There's The Moon – Nicholas, Alison
- Some Call It Love – Carpenter
- Chanticleer and Pertelote Duet – Chanticleer, Pertelote
- Chanticleer, Pertelote and Fox Trio – Chanticleer, Pertelote, Fox
- Fill Your Glass – John, Alan, Miller, Molly, Chorus
- Pilgrims' Riding Music – Company
- Come On and Marry Me, Honey – Wife of Bath
- When I Was A Boy – Pluto, January
- Where Are the Girls of Yesterday? – Young Knight
- Wedding Hymn – Company
- If She Has Never Loved Before – January
- I Give My Love A Ring – Damian, May
- I Am Forever Dated – Damian
- What do Women Most Desire? – Young Knight
- April Song – Company
- Love Will Conquer All – Queen
- The Arrival at Canterbury / Love Will Conquer All / Chaucer Epilogue / Finale – Company

In the New York production a new song, "It Depends on What You're At", was added for the Wife of Bath, and a song for the Miller, "When I Was a Boy", was replaced by "Fill Your Glass", which was also inserted into the West End show.

== Plot ==
Before the first act there is a prologue in which Chaucer explains to the audience that the telling of the tales is the suggestion of Harry Bailey, innkeeper at The Tabard in Southwark, where the pilgrims gather before riding to the tomb of Thomas Becket at Canterbury Cathedral. Chaucer and Bailey, who is referred to as "the Host", ride with them and the latter strives to keep matters running smoothly as each pilgrim tells his or her tale and hands on the story-telling to the next. The show draws on five of the tales, opening with glimpses of Chaucer, the Host and the tellers of the tales as seen in Chaucer's General Prologue. (Note: At some performances of the original West End version of the show, The Pardoner's Tale – a serious and far from bawdy story – was included.)

The first tale in the show is from the bawdy fabliau The Miller's Tale, in which two young men vie to seduce the young wife of an older carpenter. One of them succeeds, but has a hot iron pressed into his buttocks by the other, and in the ensuing hullaballoo the carpenter, tricked into sleeping in a bathtub suspended from the rafters, tumbles down onto the attic floor. After an episode from The Nun's Priest's Tale – featuring the cock Chanticleer, his wife, the hen Pertelote, and the fox who hopes to eat Chanticleer – there is another tale about two young men seeking to seduce a married woman, taken from The Reeve's Tale (called The Steward's Tale in this version). (Note: Although a reeve was once a very senior official, answerable to the sovereign, by Chaucer's time it signified an officer appointed by a landowner to supervise estates – a bailiff, steward, or overseer.)

The theme persists in the section drawn from The Merchant's Tale, in which the elderly Januarie is deceived by his young wife, May, and her lover, Damyan, after Januarie goes blind. His sight is suddenly restored and he sees the two in flagrante, leaving May with some explaining to do, which she just about manages. The Squire tries to raise the tone with a song in praise of chivalry, but the Wife of Bath is unimpressed. In her prologue, and throughout the show, she dismisses celibacy as something God does not call for, and her tale tells of a knight accused of rape, who is condemned to discover what women most desire. He turns to an ugly old witch who tells him that the answer is sovereignty over men. As promised, he marries her and has the sense to give her the answer she hopes for when asked if he would wish her ugly yet faithful or beautiful and fickle. He insists that the choice has to be hers; her youth and beauty are restored and they live "in perfect bliss" ever after.

By contrast with Chaucer's original, which ends, unfinished, while the pilgrims are still en route to Canterbury, the show has them arriving there. In The Stage, the reviewer R. B. Marriott wrote of "a finely conceived scene at Becket's tomb: simple yet gripping, a holy moment in perfect harmony with the rest of the story, and investing the characters with an extraordinary human vividness".

== Critical reception ==
The show divided critical opinion. The critic J. C. Trewin, of The Birmingham Post, called it "a sustained bore [with] some good costumes and mildly pleasant songs". John Chapman of The Daily News found it "enchanting – absolutely enchanting ... its effect is joyous because everything comes together – the company, the music, the dances, the splendid costumes and the sprightly scenery". In The Guardian, Hope-Wallace thought that Coghill's Chaucer did not transfer well from the printed page to the theatre, but found the show "an unusual and civilised kind of presentation". Punch said that the show "blows a welcome gust of laughter into the world of the British musical". In The Times, Irving Wardle said that the show "does full justice to some of the best stories English literature has to offer".

== Revivals and sequel ==
The first British revival was in 1973, part of Bristol Old Vic's contribution to the celebrations marking the 600th anniversary of the city's charter. The cast was headed by Michael Rothwell and Miriam Margolyes. The piece was revived in the West End in April 1979 at the Shaftesbury Theatre; Jack Tinker wrote, "The time could not be riper for the revival of this amiable, romping musical. Principal performances shine out with the genuine light of joy". There was a revival in New York at the Rialto Theatre in February 1980. The critic William Raidy gave it an enthusiastic review, but it closed within a month.

The four creators collaborated on a sequel to the original show, entitled More Canterbury Tales. It drew on The Pardoner's Tale, The Summoner's Tale, The Franklin's Tale and The Nun's Priest's Tale. It was premiered in 1979 in Melbourne, where the first show had been a considerable success, but it failed and was not seen anywhere else.

== Notes, references and sources ==
=== Sources ===
- Chaucer, Geoffrey (2003) [1951]. Coghill, Neville (ed.). The Canterbury Tales (second ed.). London: Penguin. ISBN 0-140-42438-5.
- Gänzl, Kurt; Lamb, Andrew (1988). Gänzl's Book of the Musical Theatre. London: The Bodley Head. ISBN 0-37-031157-4.
- Herbert, Ian, ed. (1977). Who's Who in the Theatre (sixteenth ed.). London and Detroit: Pitman Publishing and Gale Research. ISBN 978-0-273-00163-8.
