= Charles Gunning =

Charles Gunning may refer to:

- Charles Gunning (actor) (1951–2002), American actor and stuntman who appeared in The Haunting (1999 film)
- Sir Charles Vere Gunning, 7th Baronet (1859–1950) of the Gunning baronets
- Sir Charles Theodore Gunning, 9th Baronet (1935–2020) of the Gunning baronets
