= Riddell baronets of Ardnamurchan (1778) =

Escutcheon of the Riddell baronets of Ardnamurchan

The Riddell baronetcy, of Ardnamurchan in the County of Argyll, was created in the Baronetage of Great Britain on 2 September 1778 for James Riddell. He was superintendent general to the Society of British Fishery and a Fellow of the Society of Arts.

The 4th Baronet was a soldier who took part in the New Zealand Wars from 1863 to 1865, and the Second Anglo-Afghan War. He died in 1907, and the title became extinct.

== Riddell baronets, of Ardnamurchan (1778) ==
- Sir James Riddell, 1st Baronet (died 1797)
- Sir James Milles Riddell, 2nd Baronet (1787–1861)
- Sir Thomas Miles Riddell, 3rd Baronet (1822–1883)
- Sir Rodney Stuart Riddell, 4th Baronet (1838–1907), left no heir.

== Notes ==
Baronetage of Great Britain
Preceded by Taylor baronets	Riddell baronets of Ardnamurchan; 2 September 1778	Succeeded by Gunning baronets
