= Doctor Faustus (1967 film) =

1967 British film by Richard Burton and Nevill Coghill

- Theatrical release poster
- Directed by: Richard Burton; Nevill Coghill
- Screenplay by: Nevill Coghill
- Based on: The Tragical History of Doctor Faustus by Christopher Marlowe
- Produced by: Richard Burton; Richard McWhorter
- Starring: Richard Burton; Elizabeth Taylor; Andreas Teuber
- Cinematography: Gábor Pogány
- Edited by: John Shirley
- Music by: Mario Nascimbene
- Color process: Technicolor
- Production companies: Nassau Films; Oxford University Screen Productions; Venfilms
- Distributed by: Columbia Pictures
- Release dates: 19 October 1967 (United Kingdom); 6 February 1968 (United States)
- Running time: 93 minutes
- Country: United Kingdom
- Languages: English; Latin

Doctor Faustus (also known as Dr. Faustus and Il Dottor Faustus) is a 1967 British horror film adaptation of the 1588 Christopher Marlowe play The Tragical History of Doctor Faustus directed by Richard Burton and Nevill Coghill. The first theatrical film version of a Marlowe play, it was the only film directed by Burton or Coghill, Burton's Oxford University mentor. It starred Burton as the title character Faustus, with Elizabeth Taylor appearing in a silent role as Helen of Troy. The film is a permanent record of a stage production that Burton starred in and staged with Coghill at the Oxford University Dramatic Society in 1966. Burton would not appear on stage again until he took over the role of Martin Dysart in Equus on Broadway ten years later.

== Plot ==
University of Wittenberg scholar Faustus earns his doctorate, but his insatiable craving for knowledge and power leads Faustus to try his hand at necromancy in an attempt to conjure Mephistopheles out of hell. Signing the pact in his own blood, Faustus bargains his soul to Lucifer in exchange for 24 living years with Mephistopheles as his slave. Mephistopheles proceeds to reveal to Faustus the works and doings of the Devil.

== Cast ==
- Richard Burton as Doctor Faustus
- Elizabeth Taylor as Helen of Troy

Of the Oxford University Dramatic Society, Queen's College, Oxford, England:

- Andreas Teuber as Mephistopheles
- Ram Chopra as Valdes
- Richard Carwardine as Cornelius
- Patrick Barwise as Wagner
- Michael Meneaugh as Good Angel / Bishop
- Richard Durden as Evil Angel / Knight (credited as Richard Durden-Smith)
- David McIntosh as Lucifer
- Jeremy Eccles as Beelzebub
- Gwydion Thomas as Lechery
- Ian Marter as Pride / Emperor
- Nicholas Loukes as Envy / Cardinal of Lorraine
- Adrian Benjamin as Pope
- Elizabeth O'Donovan as Empress

With:

- Ambrose Coghill as Avarice
- Maria Aitken as Sloth (uncredited)
- Hugh Williams as Scholar

== Reception ==
Reviews of the Oxford University staged version in the British press were mostly interested in the return of Burton to the stage at his old alma mater after a stellar career in film. Elizabeth Taylor's stage debut in the silent role of Helen of Troy naturally attracted comments, such as "Miss Taylor incarnates Troy's destroyer" from Harold Hobson in the Sunday Times. Inspired by his wife, Burton's famous line, "Was this the face that launched a thousand ships", "seemed like a cry of wonder we have never heard before", according to Hobson. The movie, however, received a terribly negative review in The New York Times, Renata Adler criticizing the adaptation of the text ("the play has been quite badly cut"), Burton's performance ("he seems happiest shouting in Latin, or in Ms. Taylor's ear"), the score ("some horrible electronic Wagnerian theme music"), and Taylor's role ("in this last role [Alexander's paramour], she is, for some reason, frosted all over with silver—like a pastry, or a devaluated refugee from Goldfinger"), reserving praise only for Teuber's performance ("one fine, very pious performance").
