= Taylor baronets of Lysson Hall (1778) =

Escutcheon of the Taylor baronets, of Lysson Hall, Jamaica

The Taylor baronetcy, of Lysson Hall in Jamaica, was created in the Baronetage of Great Britain on 1 September 1778 for John Taylor, a slave-owning planter. The title became extinct on the death of the 2nd Baronet in 1815.

== Taylor baronets, of Lysson Hall (1778) ==
- Sir John Taylor, 1st Baronet (1745–1786)
- Sir Simon Taylor, 2nd Baronet (1783–1815)

== Notes ==
Baronetage of Great Britain
Preceded by Cramer-Coghill baronets	Taylor baronets of Lysson Hall; 1 September 1778	Succeeded by Riddell baronets
