= Elizabeth Gunning =

Elizabeth Gunning may refer to:

- Elizabeth Gunning (writer), translator and novelist
- Elizabeth Hamilton, 1st Baroness Hamilton of Hameldon (1733–1790), née Gunning, aunt of the writer

== See also ==
- Gunning (disambiguation)
