= Imogen Bain =

English actress (1959–2014)

- Born: 17 April 1959; London, England
- Died: 5 July 2014 (aged 55); London, England
- Occupation: Actress
- Spouse: Simon Holmes

Imogen Bain (17 April 1959 – 5 July 2014) was an English stage and screen actress.

== Early years ==
Bain was born in London, England, to Jessie Evans, an actress, and Donald Bain, a director. Initially stunted as a youth with dyslexia, Bain went on to study at the Guildhall School of Music and Drama. In 1973, she starred in an episode of Thirty-Minute Theatre on the BBC.

== Career ==
Bain eventually followed her parents into show business, making a name for herself on the British stage. She made her West End debut in Daisy Pulls It Off at the Globe Theatre.

Bain made appearances in film, appearing in Robin Hood: Prince of Thieves and The Phantom of the Opera. Her television work, included roles in Casualty and The Sarah Jane Adventures.

She also appeared regularly as Dame Edna Everage's daughter Valmai on UK television's The Dame Edna Treatment.

Bain taught at the Actor's Centre in Covent Garden and, with Andrea Brooks, formed the Good Luck Company.

== Personal life and death ==
Bain was married to actor Simon Holmes.

Bain died on 5 July 2014, aged 55.

== Filmography ==
Year	Title	Role	Notes
1982	Scrubbers	Sandy	
1991	Robin Hood: Prince of Thieves	Sarah	
1994	Decadence	The Entourage #8	
1997	Preaching to the Perverted	Mrs. Cutts Watson	
2000	The Calling	Bargirl	
2004	The Phantom of the Opera	Carlotta's Maid	
2008	Angus, Thongs and Perfect Snogging	Headmistress	
2011	Swinging with the Finkels	Obese Lady	
2012	Cocktail	Lady at Restrobar	
2013	Scar Tissue	Mo McQueen	
