= Sir Robert Gunning, 1st Baronet =

British diplomat

Sir Robert Gunning, 1st Baronet GCB (8 June 1731 – 22 September 1816) was a British diplomat. He served as the British minister in Denmark 1765–1771, in Prussia in 1771 and in Russia 1772–1776. Gunning was appointed a Knight Companion of the Order of the Bath on 9 July 1773 and the first Baronet of Eltham in the County of Kent on 27 October 1778.

== Family ==
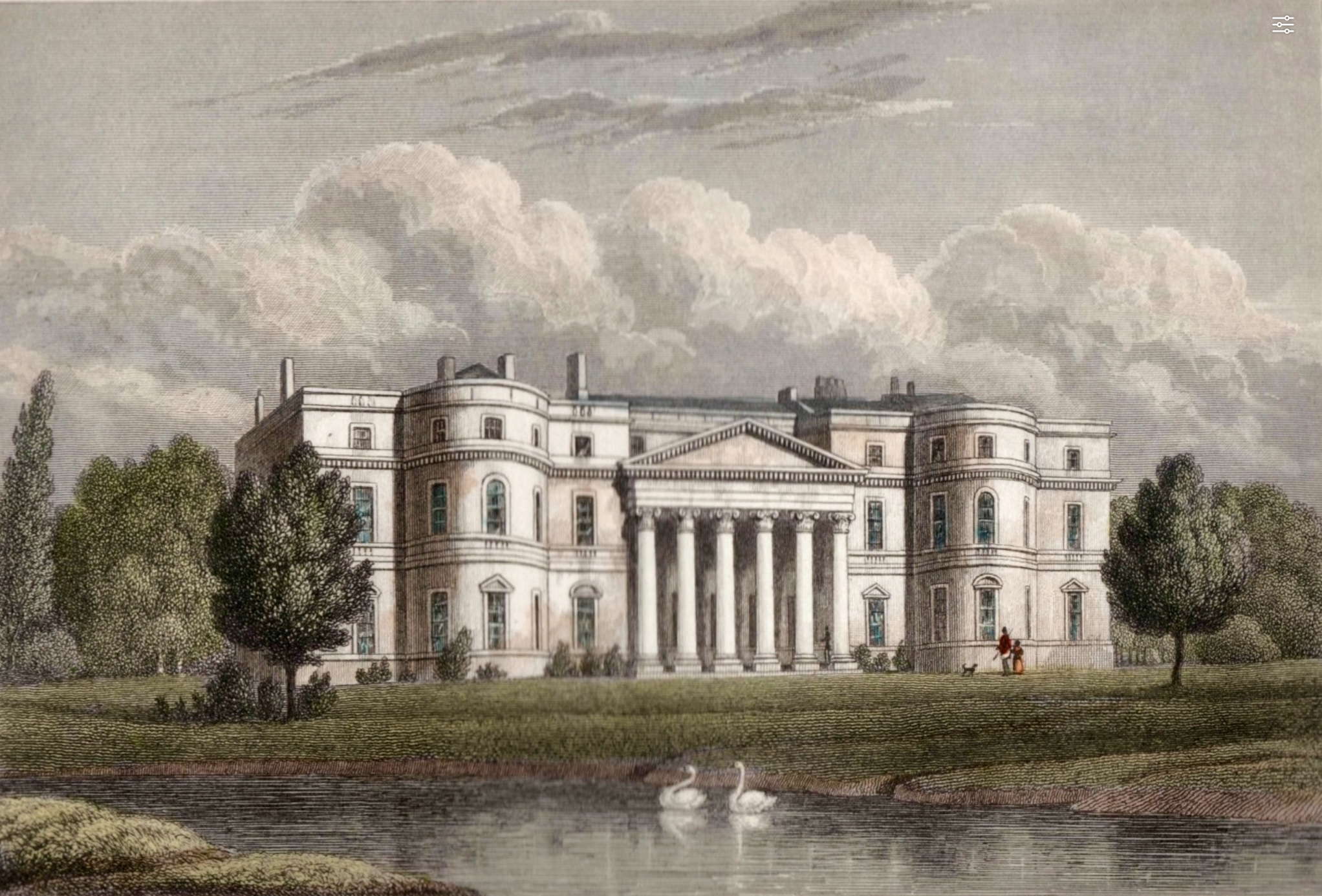
Horton House in 1830

The Gunnings were an Irish family. His country seat was at Horton in Northamptonshire, England, which he purchased 1782; he was the eldest son of Robert Gunning - and his mother was Catherine, the daughter of John Edwards. The family was descended from Richard Gunning, who was an uncle of Peter Gunning, the Bishop of Ely who had settled in Ireland in the time of James I. The Gunning family stayed at Horton Hall until 1888 when it was sold to Pickering Phipps, the Northampton brewer. Later still, it was sold to George Winterbottom.

=== Marriages ===
- 27 March 1752, Elizabeth, daughter of John Harrison of Grantham, by whom he had no children
- 1757, Anne, daughter of Robert Sutton of Scofton, Nottinghamshire, by whom he had a son, George William, who succeeded to the title; a daughter Charlotte Margaret, maid of honour to Queen Charlotte, who married, on 6 January 1790, the Hon. Stephen Digby; and also another daughter, Barbara Evelyn Isabella, who married in 1795 Major-General Ross.

== The diplomatic service ==
Gunning entered the diplomatic service, and on 23 November 1765 was appointed minister resident at the court of Denmark, where he arrived in April of the following year. His instructions were to assist the envoy extraordinary and minister plenipotentiary, Walter Titley, and to keep the British government well informed of passing events. He seems to have performed his duties with regularity, tact, and ability, and on the death of Titley (27 February 1768) he succeeded to the post of envoy extraordinary and minister plenipotentiary.

On 13 April 1771 he was appointed envoy extraordinary and minister plenipotentiary to the court of Prussia, but did not leave Copenhagen until the end of June, reaching Berlin in the following month. On 13 Dec. he was transferred with the same rank to the court of Russia, where he arrived early in the following June, and was received in the most distinguished manner by the empress. His instructions, dated 28 May 1772, directed him to offer the services of the British government as mediator between Russia and the Porte, with a view to effecting a treaty of peace, and to support the policy of the empress in Poland, but to attempt to secure toleration for the Greek church and other dissident religious bodies.

Gunning was also instructed at a later date to solicit the intervention of the empress on behalf of the city of Dantzig in its quarrel with the king of Prussia, who was accused of levying exorbitant dues for the use of Dantzig harbour, which, on the partition of Poland, had been ceded to him without the city's. Gunning made repeated representations to the Russian foreign ministers on the subject, but met with none but evasive answers. By the empress herself Gunning was uniformly treated with marked distinction. When he dined with her she would address the greater part of her conversation to him, and she frequently admitted him to private audiences. On one occasion she condescended to order through him four copies of Kennicott's edition of the Old Testament in Hebrew, for which he gave his cheque on his bankers.

The way in which Gunning discharged his duties were much appreciated by the King George III, who, unsolicited, nominated him as a Knight Companion of the Order of the Bath on 2 June 1773, and requested the empress to invest him with the insignia of the order. She consented, and selected 9 July, the anniversary of her own accession, for the ceremony, and when it was over gave him the gold-hilted sword set with diamonds with which she had knighted him.

In the summer of 1775 he was instructed to sound out the Russian foreign minister, Panin, as to the possibility of obtaining Russian troops in case of necessity for service in North America. Gunning received encouraging replies from Panin, and afterwards from the empress herself. A regular negotiation was soon afterwards opened for a contingent of twenty thousand disciplined Russian infantry completely equipped (except their field pieces), to be furnished by the empress, and placed under the command of an English General, and transported in English ships to Canada, for service against the revolted states.

A pretext for rupturing the negotiation was found in the demand of the British Government that the principal officers of the contingent should take the oath of allegiance to the British crown. Gunning's conduct in the affair was much praised by Lord Suffolk. In the following November he sought and obtained his recall on account of ill-health.

He died at his seat at Horton, near Northampton, on 22 September 1816.

Diplomatic posts
Preceded by Walter Titley	British Minister to Denmark; 1768-1771	Succeeded by Robert Murray Keith (the younger)
Preceded by Andrew Mitchell	British Minister to Prussia; 1771 – 1772	Succeeded by James Harris
Preceded by The Lord Cathcart	British Ambassador to Russia; 1772 – 1776	Succeeded by James Harris
Baronetage of Great Britain
New creation	Baronet (of Eltham); 1778 – 1816	Succeeded by George William Gunning
