= Yvonne Coghill =

British National Health Service manager

Yvonne Veronica Coghill is a British National Health Service manager who currently serves on the NHS Equality and Diversity Council and is the vice president of the Royal College of Nursing.

== Early life ==
Coghill moved to the United Kingdom with her mother in the 1950s from Guyana (then British Guiana). Her mother worked in Frenchay Hospital in Bristol.

== Career ==
Coghill began training as a nurse in 1977 at Central Middlesex Hospital, qualifying as a general nurse in 1980. She entered NHS management in 1986.

She worked in the Department of Health from 2004 to 2007 including as private secretary to the chief executive of the NHS.

Coghill sits as a member of the NHS Equality and Diversity Council. She is a faculty member of the US-based Institute for Healthcare Improvement. She was elected vice president of the Royal College of Nursing in 2018, to hold office from January 2019 to December 2020.

== Honours ==
Coghill was made an Officer of the Order of the British Empire (OBE) in 2010 for services to healthcare. She was made a Commander of the same order (CBE) in 2018 for commitment to equality and diversity in the NHS. She was made a fellow of the Royal College of Nursing in 2018.

She was made a fellow of King's College London, as well as awarded honorary doctorates by both Buckinghamshire New University and Middlesex University in 2018.
