= Sir George Gunning, 2nd Baronet =

English politician

Sir George William Gunning
- 2nd Baronet Gunning of Eltham
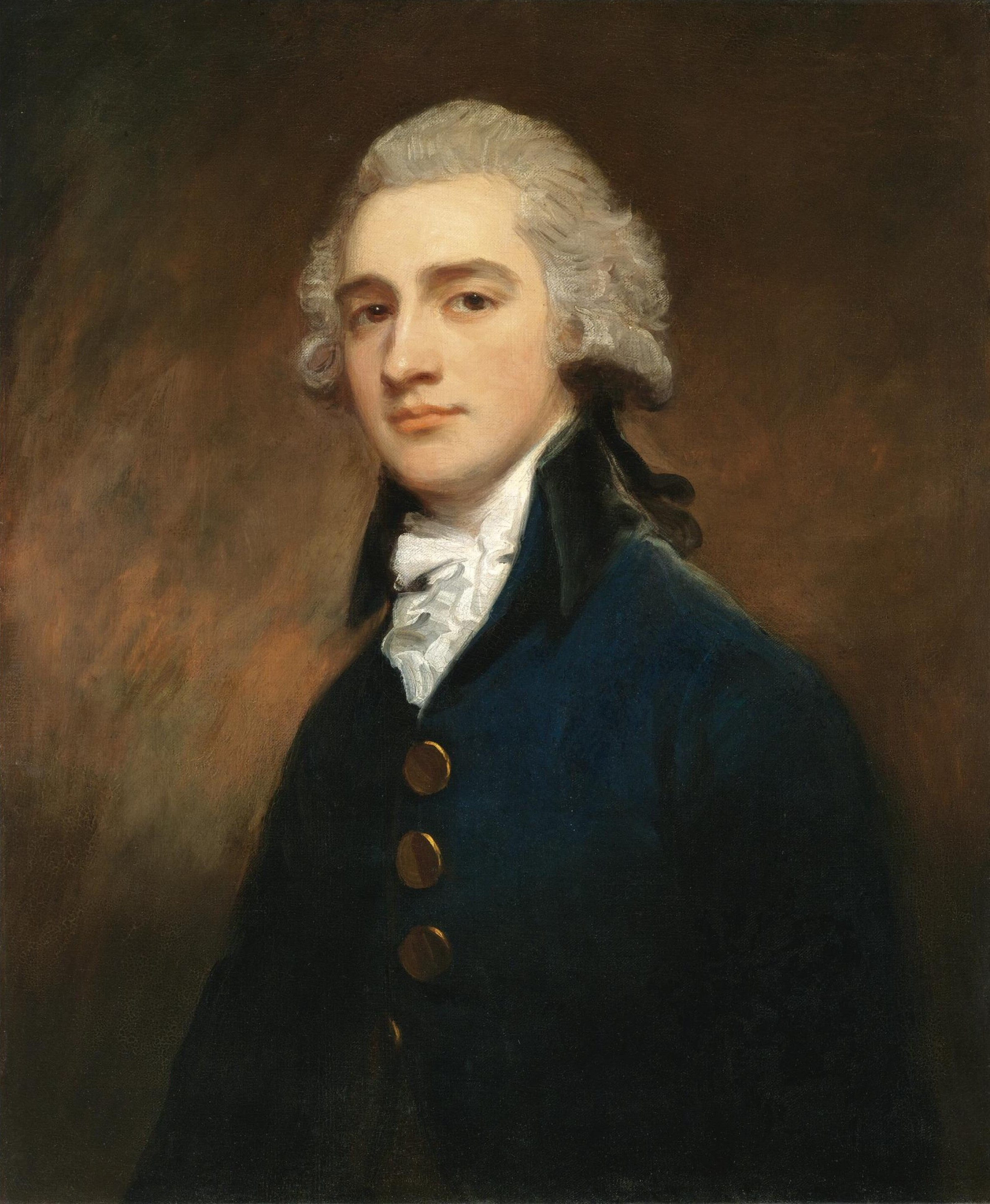
- Portrait by George Romney
- Born: 15 February 1763; Horton, Northamptonshire
- Died: 7 April 1823 (aged 60)
- Noble family: Gunning Family
- Spouse: Hon. Elizabeth Bridgeman
- Issue: 6 sons
- Father: Sir Robert Gunning, 1st Baronet
- Mother: Anne Sutton

Sir George Gunning, 2nd Baronet (1763–1823), of Horton, Northamptonshire, was an English politician.

He was a Member of Parliament (MP) for Wigan 21 June 1800 – 1802, Hastings 1802 – 1806 and East Grinstead 9 March 1812 – May 1812 and 1812 – 1818.

== Personal life ==
Gunning married Hon. Elizabeth Bridgeman, daughter of Henry Bridgeman, 1st Baron Bradford on 10 February 1794.

- Sir Robert Henry Gunning, 3rd Baronet, (26 December 1795 - 22 September 1862)
- George Orlando Gunning, (18 December 1796 - 18 June 1815), died as a Lieutenant in the 10th Hussars at the Battle of Waterloo
- Rev. Sir Henry Gunning, 4th Baronet (17 December 1797 - 30 June 1885), married, firstly, Mary Catherine Cartwright, daughter of William Ralph Cartwright and secondly, Frances Rose Spencer daughter of Rev. Hon. William Henry Spencer (son of Francis Spencer, 1st Baron Churchill)
- Captain Orlando George Gunning-Sutton, RN (12 May 1799 - 5 May 1852), married Mary Dorothea Seymour, daughter of Sir Michael Seymour, 1st Baronet
- Reverend Spencer Greswolde Gunning JP (27 October 1800 - 29 May 1867), married Anne Janette Connell, daughter of James Connell
- Major John Gunning (21 December 1801 - 13 October 1845), married Jessie Babington, daughter of Rev. Charles Babington

Baronetage of Great Britain
Preceded by Robert Gunning	Baronet (of Eltham); 1816–1823	Succeeded by Robert Gunning
