= Christiaan Pieter Gunning =

Dutch pedagogue and classicist

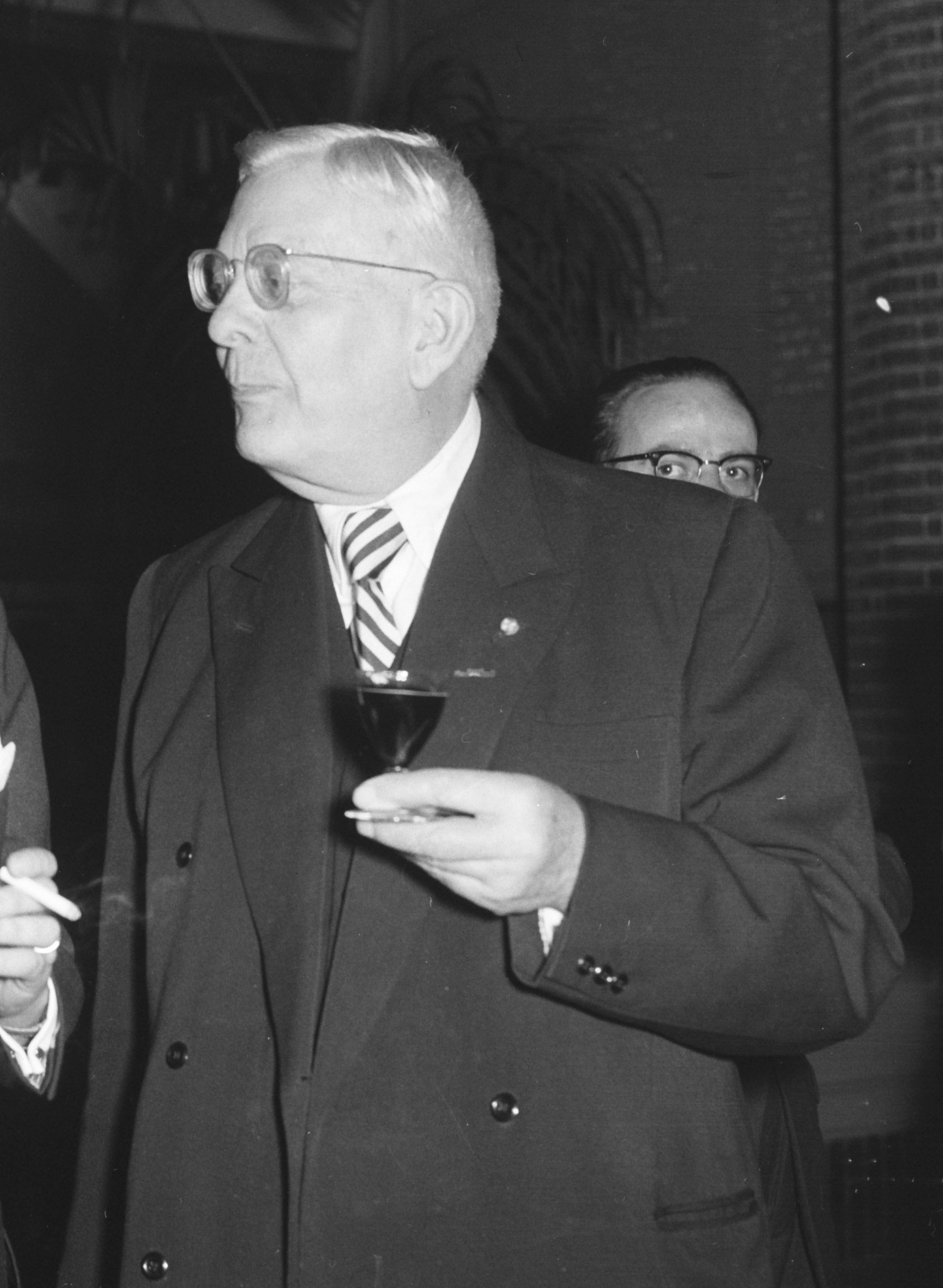
Gunning in 1957

Christiaan Pieter Gunning (Utrecht, 12 October 1886 – Amsterdam, 16 June 1960) was a Dutch pedagogue and classicist. He obtained his doctorate at the University of Amsterdam as a doctor in classical literature in 1915.

C.P. Gunning was a member of the family Gunning and a son of Johannes Hermanus Gunning Wzn. (1859–1951) and Cecilia van Eeghen (1858–1899). He married in 1911 with Sara Elisabeth Lulofs (1884).

He was the founder and first principle of the Amsterdams Lyceum (1917–1952), which as school was for a long time referred to as "Gunning". When in September/October 1941 the Jewish students were sent away from the non-Jewish schools by the German occupiers, he organized a demonstrative farewell meeting with the motto "Vaart Wel" (safe travels). He was arrested for this and was sent to the concentration camp near Amersfoort.

Gunning also chaired the Reformed Council for Church and Family and the World Federalist Movement Netherlands.

== Bibliography ==
Publications of C.P. Gunning:

- Dissertatio inauguralis de sophistis Graeciae praeceptoribus, proefschrift, Amsterdam, 1915
- Indië en Jong-Nederland: Bijdragen uit veler pen, beoogende ons opgroeiend geslacht Indië beter te doen kennen en begrijpen, 1926
- Op de schoolbanken in het P.D.A. : wat ik heb ervaren en geleerd in het concentratie-kamp te Amersfoort januari-April 1942, uitg. Elsevier, Amsterdam, 1945
- Gedenkboek 1940-1945 van Het Amsterdams Lyceum, uitg. Doorgeven, Amsterdam, 1947

(from Dutch)
