= Richard Hill (composer) =

British composer (1942–2026)

Richard Vincent Hill (22 August 1942 – 13 June 2026) was a British composer. He initially studied trombone at the Royal College of Music in London in the 1960s, before moving into music production and composition.

== Life and career ==
At the Royal College of Music Hill became a founder member of the London Gabrieli Brass Ensemble. He also worked in rock and jazz circles playing with the Dave Keir Jazz Band among others. After leaving College, Hill played in a number of symphony orchestras on a freelance basis including the Royal Opera House Orchestra, the London Philharmonic and the Philharmonia. Working under such conductors as Sir Georg Solti, Leonard Bernstein and Rudolf Schwarz, Hill further broadened his musical experience by playing Duke Ellington's music under Billy Strayhorn in a production of Shakespeare's Timon of Athens.

In the 1960s, Hill’s career underwent a sea change when he joined Polydor Records as a producer and studio arranger at the height of the sixties pop boom. He stopped playing and began to compose. This in turn led to a career as a media composer in film, television and theatre. Film scores included To Kill a Clown starring Alan Alda and Baffled! starring Susan Hampshire and Leonard Nimoy.

Along with television themes, station promos and advertising jingles, Hill wrote scores for major drama series, including Arnold Bennett's Clayhanger trilogy, John Mortimer's Will Shakespeare and Don Shaw's Sounding Brass. Throughout this period Hill had worldwide success as cowriter with Johnny Hawkins of the musical Canterbury Tales, which ran for over five years in the West End, became a Broadway production for Frank Loesser, and is still occasionally performed around the world. In 1986 Chris Barber commissioned and cowrote a concerto for jazz trombone with Hill. It premiered behind the Berlin Wall at the Palast der Republik on 2 October 1986.

Between the mid-1990s and 2008, Hill worked on some major concert halls and symphonic projects. The Symphony of Jazz repertoire, The Rime of the Ancient Mariner and Images from Kubla Khan all represent his new style of integrated contemporary music.

Hill died on 13 June 2026, aged 83.

== Sources ==
- Phoenix Theatre Program for The Canterbury Tales
