= Egerton Coghill =

Irish painter

- Born: 7 February 1853; Castletownshend, County Cork, Ireland
- Died: 9 October 1921 (aged 68); England

Sir Egerton Bushe Coghill, 5th Baronet (7 February 1853 – 9 October 1921) was an Irish painter.

== Life and family ==
Coghill was born on 7 February 1853 in Castletownshend, County Cork. He was the second son of Irish painter Sir John Joscelyn Coghill, 4th Baronet, and his wife the Hon. Katherine Frances, daughter of John Plunket, 3rd Baron Plunket. Victoria Cross recipient Nevill Coghill was his elder brother. Edith Anna Somerville was his cousin. He initially trained as an engineer at Haileybury School, Hertfordshire.

Coghill married Elizabeth Somerville of Drishane, Skibbereen, County Cork. She was a sister of Edith Somerville. Coghill was succeeded as baronet by his eldest son Marmaduke Coghill, a soldier in both World Wars. His second son was Nevill Coghill, a professor at Oxford University, while a younger son was the actor Ambrose Coghill.

Coghill died during a visit to England on 9 October 1921. He was initially buried at Twickenham, but was exhumed in 1923 and brought back to Ireland to be reburied at St Barrahane's churchyard, Castletownshend.

== Career ==
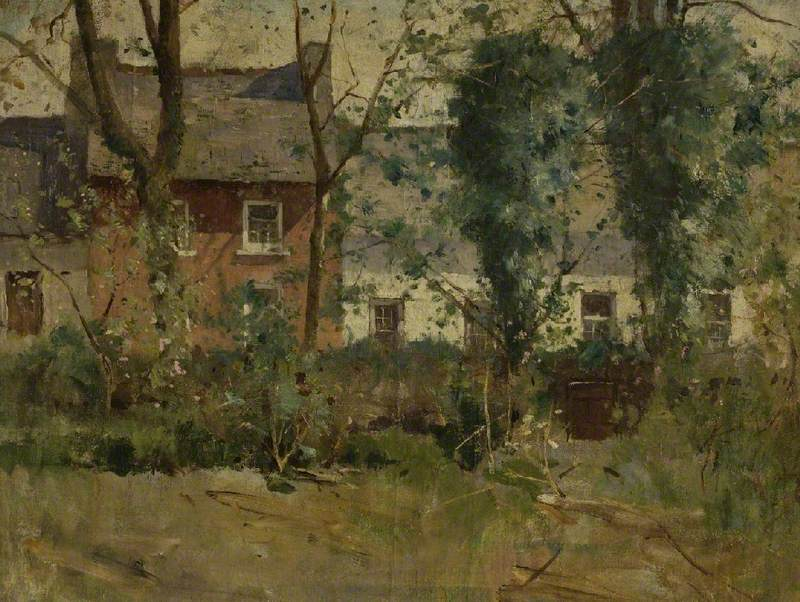
The Mall from Malmaison, Castletownshend by Coghill held in the Fitzwilliam Museum

He left a career in engineering to pursue one in the arts, studying in Düsseldorf and he Académie Julian in Paris. From 1883 to 1884 he lived at Barbizon near Fontainebleau, then travelled to England where he became a member of the New English Art Club. Coghill exhibited at the Royal Hibernian Academy between 1882 and 1919, and the Liverpool Autumn Exhibitions at the Walker Art Gallery. He returned to his native land and settled in his home town of Castletownshend having left Paris in 1884. He showed once at the Paris Salon in 1886, and he never exhibited with the Royal Academy. Many of his paintings feature the landscapes of County Cork. Coghill had no desire for publicity and was not competitive, which resulted in him showing his work relatively rarely.

The Crawford Gallery, the National Gallery of Ireland, and the Ashmolean Museum all hold examples of his work. A retrospective exhibition of his work was held in the Ashmolean in 1964, displaying 73 of his paintings. In 1965, a smaller exhibition was held at the Alpine Club gallery, London.

The "Egerton Coghill Landscape Prize" was established in his memory at the University of Oxford.

Baronetage of Great Britain
Preceded by John Joscelyn Coghill	Baronet (of Coghill); 1905–1921	Succeeded by Marmaduke Nevill Patrick Somerville Coghill
