= Jimmy Gunning =

Scottish footballer

Personal information
- Full name: James Michael Gunning
- Date of birth: 25 June 1929
- Place of birth: Helensburgh, Scotland
- Date of death: 27 August 1993 (aged 64)
- Place of death: Dublin, Ireland
- Position: Outside right

Youth career
- –1946: Wolverhampton Wanderers

Senior career*
Years	Team	Apps	(Gls)
1946–1950	Hibernian	1	(0)
- → Forres Mechanics (loan)
1950–1953	Manchester City	13	(0)
1953–1954	Weymouth		
1954–1955	Barrow	10	(1)
1957–1958	Mossley	1	(0)
1957–1958	Nelson		
1958–1959	Radcliffe Borough	10	(2)
- * Club domestic league appearances and goals

James Michael Gunning (25 June 1929 – 27 August 1993) was a Scottish professional football winger. He played in the Scottish Football League for Hibernian and in the English Football League for Manchester City and Barrow.

Born in Helensburgh, Gunning was a junior with Wolverhampton Wanderers, but was unable to settle and returned to Scotland in 1946, signing for Hibernian as an amateur. He then joined the Royal Air Force; a posting in the Highlands allowed Gunning to play Highland League football for Forres Mechanics. After leaving the RAF, Gunning returned to Easter Road, but he found first team opportunities very limited as Hibs enjoyed the services of The Famous Five. He played once for Hibs in a league match, during the 1950–51 season.

Gunning signed for Manchester City in November 1950. During three seasons with the club, Gunning made 13 league appearances. He left City in 1953, joining non-league Weymouth but in 1954 returned to the Football League when he joined Barrow, playing ten times in the 1954–55 season.

Gunning played once for Mossley in the 1957–58 season before moving on to Nelson F.C then finished his career with Radcliffe Borough in the 1958-59 Manchester League season.
