= John G. S. Coghill =

John G. S. Coghill M.D., F.S.A. SCOT.
- Born: 1834; Windsor
- Died: 1899 (aged 64–65); St. Catherine’s House, Ventnor, Isle of Wight
- Education: University of Edinburgh
- Known for: Work in the fields of gynecology, obstetrics and tuberculosis.
- Spouse: Agnes Darling

Dr John George Sinclair Coghill FRCPE FSA(Scot) (1834–1899) was a medical doctor specializing in obstetrics and respiratory complaints, especially tuberculosis, and was one of the earliest European medical doctors to travel to China and Japan. He also served in the Crimean War and later trained under Sir James Young Simpson.

== Early life ==
John G. S. Coghill was born at Windsor in 1834, the son of John Coghill (1806–1882) and Alexandrina MacKay (d.1880). The family moved to Edinburgh in 1844 where his father ran a store at 10 Rose Street, with the family living over the shop. His father is also listed as a sergeant in the Royal Midlothian Yeomanry Cavalry.

John grew up in Edinburgh where he attended the Royal High School. Both of Coghill's parents were from Caithness but as John G. S. Coghill's father, John Coghill, served in the 2nd Regiment of Life Guards the family moved around. J G. S. Coghill attended the Medical School at the University of Edinburgh and in 1857 he was awarded his MD which is now publicly available on the University's website. In the middle of his studies the Crimean War broke out and he volunteered as a surgeon's mate in the Royal Navy, he sailed out on HMS Conflict, part of the Baltic fleet, mostly operating between Memel and Riga. Coghill was a decorated war hero, having seen some action in the Baltic sea he received: the Baltic medal 1854–55, (engraved John G.S.Coghill, H.M.S. "Conflict"); and a miniature Baltic Medal. On his return from the conflict he continued his studies and was academically successful, especially in anatomy, midwifery and medical jurisprudence, receiving various awards for his studies. He was able to secure an apprenticeship with Sir James Young Simpson, with whom he lived for two years, to further his studies in obstetrics, before moving to Glasgow in 1859.

== Family life ==
In 1861, whilst living at 17 Newton Terrace in Glasgow John G. S. Coghill married Agnes Darling. The Coghills went on to have twelve children, seven of these children were born in China and sadly only four of their children survived infancy; one son and three daughters. Three of these surviving children also pursued a career in medicine:

- Mary Stuart Sinclair Coghill-Hawkes (1862– : Born in Shanghai in 1862, she survived the diseases which had affected her family. She gained entry to the London School of Medicine for Women and took the Triple Qualification (LRCPE, LRCSE, LRFPSG) in 1896. Four years later she graduated MD at Brussels and shortly afterwards married Dr Lewis Hawkes who had also trained at Edinburgh and had been a medical officer at RNHC Ventnor, where her father worked. She became registrar and anesthetist at the Waterloo Hospital for Children and Women and in 1904 she founded the Swedish Institute, in London.
- Agnes Irene Sinclair Coghill (1872–1904): Mary's younger sister was born in Thurso, Caithness. She attended the Medical College for Women at Minto House, Edinburgh where she did well, gaining a distinction in gynecology. She graduated MB CM in 1897. The following year she married Mr Percy Coghill of Liverpool.
- Harold Sinclair Coghill (1880–1919): the youngest son of the Coghills, was born in Ventnor, Isle of Wight. Following his father to Edinburgh University, he graduated MB ChB in 1905 and immediately showed an interest in going East, preparing himself well by taking the Certificate of the London School of Tropical Medicine in 1908 and the Diploma in Tropical Medicine and Hygiene at Cambridge in 1911. After serving as a senior demonstrator at the London School of Tropical Medicine he joined the West African Medical Service and was an assistant at the Medical Research Institute at Lagos, Nigeria. He was then sent to Sekondi in the Gold Coast as a member of the special commission investigating yellow fever and other non-malarial fevers. He returned to the UK in 1919 and died that year at Guildford at the early age of thirty-eight.

In 1869 the Coghills left China and returned to Edinburgh, potentially having been influenced by the death in infancy of five children and by Agnes Coghill's ill health.

== Early career ==
In 1859 Coghill moved to Glasgow working at the University as a demonstrator in anatomy under Professor Allan Thomson. He lectured on his MD thesis subject and published his work in seven parts in The Lancet.

In 1861 he and his wife departed for China where he became municipal medical officer of Shanghai and consulting physician to the General Hospital there. The annual report of this hospital for 1864 records that ‘cholera raged during the hot season with a daily mortality of between 700 and 1,200'.

== Travels in China and Japan ==
In 1865 and 1869 Coghill visited Japan not long after their isolationist foreign policy had ended.

In 1868, he undertook a journey to the Great Wall of China, a trip of considerable length and difficulty and which he did write about later: ‘I left Peking at noon of the 12 October 1868 by the Ta-ling Mun or north-west gate with a party of friends mounted on the excellent native ponies with three double mule carts containing our servants and baggage.’ After a three day journey he continues: ‘Thursday we were astir early anxious to gain a closer inspection of the Great Wall which we had had in sight most of the previous day . . . We then toiled up on the top of the wall to the highest mountain peak above the town. The view was superb and the noble wall with its frequent towers could be traced with the glass for miles following the highest ridge of the mountain range east and west.’ He comments particularly on ‘the beauty of its materials and workmanship and the extraordinary engineering feats overcome in its construction.

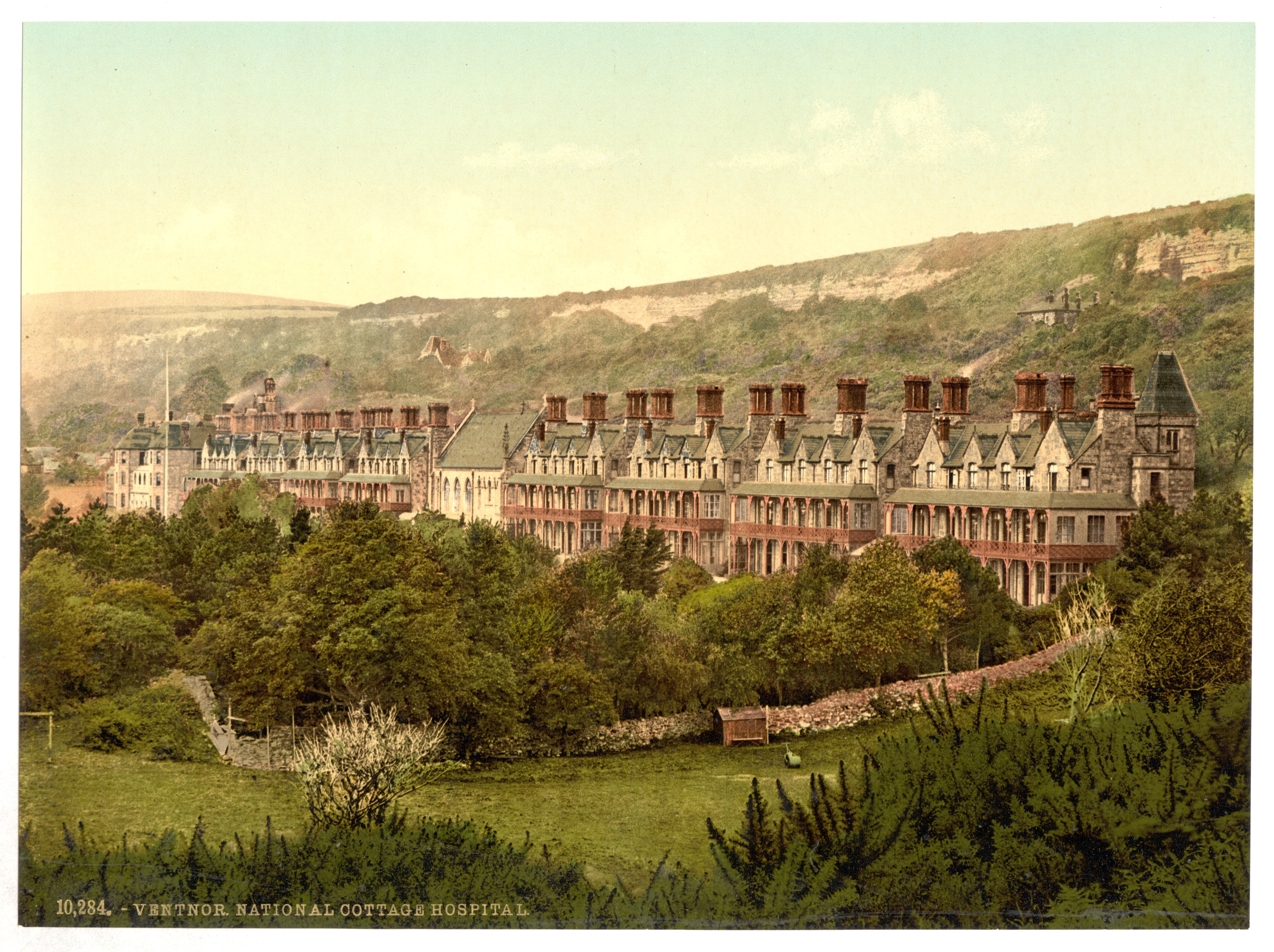
Ventnor Hospital where Coghill worked from 1875.

In 1869, on his return from China, Coghill was elected a Fellow of the Society of Antiquaries of Scotland. To the Proceedings of this Society he contributed two papers and to the Society itself donated items from his travels in the East, namely, a complete suit of Japanese armour, an iron bell from a pagoda near Peking and a brick from the Great Wall of China.

== Later career and death ==
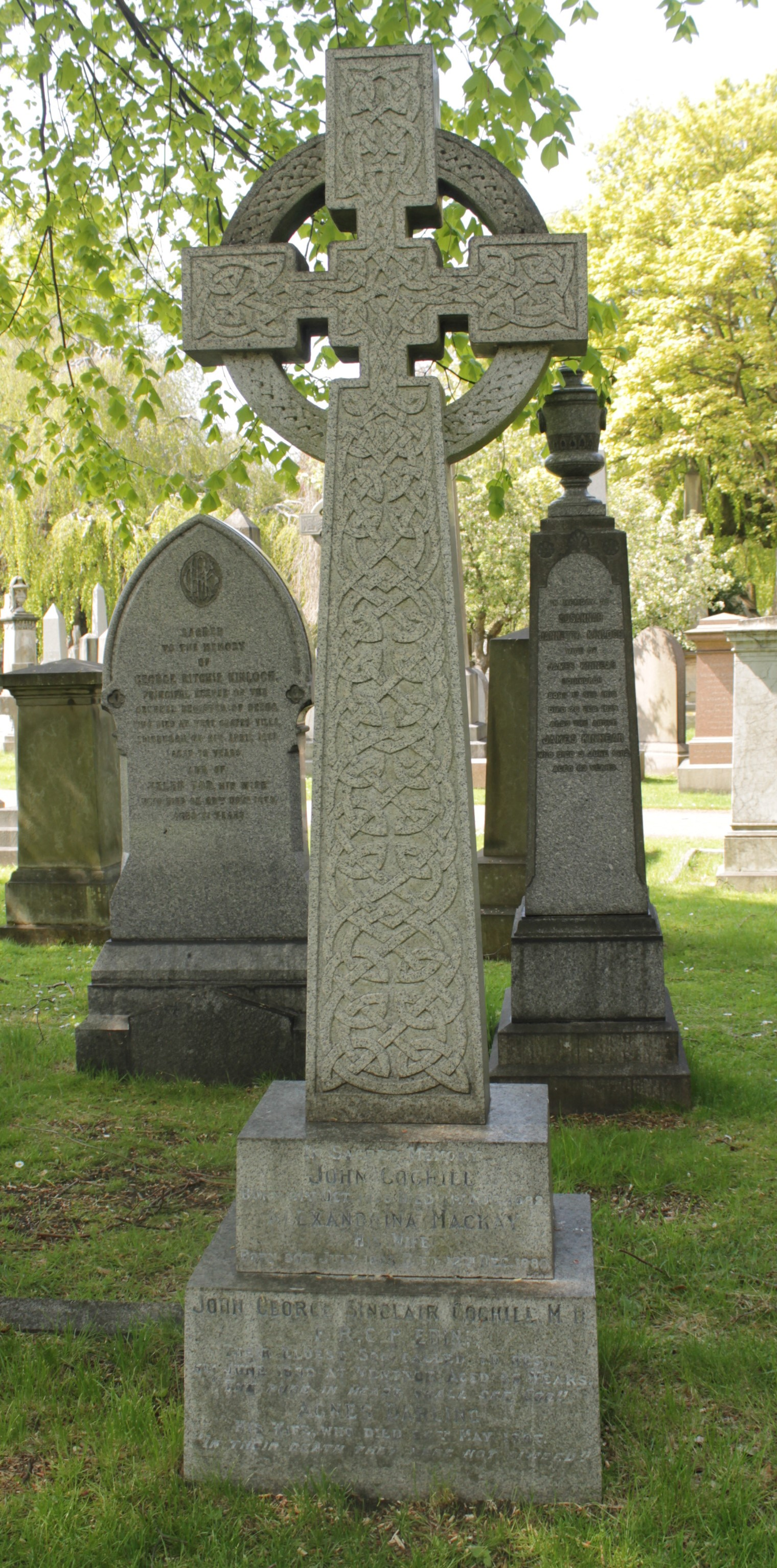
The grave of J. G. S. Coghill, Dean Cemetery

In 1869 Coghill returned to Edinburgh and was elected to the Fellowship of the Royal College of Physicians of Edinburgh. He resumed his association with James Young Simpson, who was already by this time involved in his pioneering work on anesthesia in obstetrics. Coghill undertook the editing of some of Simpson’s papers and he delivered lectures on his behalf to the university students, on the subject of general pathology and pathological anatomy. He also attended to Simpson professionally during his final illness. In 1875 he was elected a member of the Harveian Society of Edinburgh.

Failing to be elected as chair of obstetrics at the University of Edinburgh in 1875, a position which was controversially given to James Young Simpson (the nephew of the above mentioned Professor), Coghill and family moved to Ventnor, in the Isle of Wight. He went to work in the Royal National Hospital for Consumption and Diseases of the Chest which opened in 1868 and was its first consulting physician. The hospital was founded by Arthur Hill Hassal had himself suffered from tuberculosis while he was senior physician to the Royal Free Hospital, London and had moved to the Isle of Wight in search of a cure. The hospital became a part of the National Health Service in 1948.

Coghill embraced the field of tuberculosis enthusiastically although not wholly abandoning his interests as a generalist and in gynaecology. In 1894 he became a Knight Commander of the Order of St. Sava, from the Kingdom of Serbia, for his scientific contributions. He was elected a Corresponding Fellow of the Gynaecological Society of Boston; as Vice President of the British Gynaecological Association he addressed the appropriate section of the BMA meeting in 1881 and in 1887 was Vice President of the Therapeutics section of the International Medical Congress held in Washington USA. In 1888 he had the honour of receiving Queen Victoria on her visit to the hospital (his young son Harold ‘in Highland dress’ presented her with a bouquet).

He died in Ventnor on 5 June 1899 but is buried with his parents in Dean Cemetery in the west of the city. The grave is marked by a pale granite Celtic cross and lies in the small central southern section.

== Publications ==
- Coghill, J. G. S. (1852). On the structural relations of the peripheral nervous system, thesis. University of Edinburgh.
- Coghill, J. G. S. (1868–70). Notice of a Recent Visit to the Great Wall of China. (pp 403–7).
- Coghill, J. G. S. (1872). Incision of the Cervix Uteri, with Description of a New Hysterotome. Transactions. Edinburgh Obstetrical Society, 2, 340–345.
- Coghill, J. G. S. (1876). The Mechanical Treatment of Flexions and Displacements of the Uterus. British Medical Journal, 1 (803), 624–627.
- Coghill, J. G. S. (1877). Therapeutic Notes on the Chloride of Calcium. The Indian Medical Gazette, 12 (12), 335–336.
- Coghill, J. G. S. (1877). Case of Œsophageal Fistula Opening through Thoracic Parietes Laterally. British Medical Journal, 1 (838), 68–69.
- Coghill, J. G. S. (1878). Jaborandi Proposed as a Remedy in Hydrophobia. British Medical Journal, 1 (888), 9–10.
- Coghill, J. G. S. (1879). Irritable Spine as an Idiopathic Affection. British Medical Journal, 2 (980), 571–573.
- Coghill, J. G. S. (1879). Nitrite of Amyl in Chloral-Poisoning. British Medical Journal, 1 (965), 969.
- Coghill, J. G. S. (1881). Address in Obstetric Medicine. British Medical Journal, 2 (1077), 314–320.
- Coghill, J. G. S. (1881). Remarks on the Mechanical Treatment of Uterine Displacements and Flexions. British Medical Journal, 2 (1079), 387–389.
- Coghill, J. G. S. (1881). Dr. Pallen and Lacerations of the Cervin Uteri. British Medical Journal, 2 (1088), 759.
- Coghill, J. G. S. (1881). Antiseptic Inhalation in Pulmonary Affections. British Medical Journal, 1 (1065), 841–843.
- Coghili, J. G. S., Whitehead, J. L., Williamson, J. M., Harvey, W. A., & Lowther, H. (1882). Typhoid at Ventnor? British Medical Journal, 2 (1141), 966.
- Coghill, J. G. S. (1885). A New Form of Vaginal Pessary. British Medical Journal, 1 (1253), 15.
- Coghill, J. G. S. (1891). Observations on the Effect of the Injection of Tuberculin on the Pulse. British Medical Journal, 2 (1611), 1037–1038.
- Coghill, J. G. S. (1895). The Prophylaxis of Influenza. British Medical Journal, 1 (1788), 751–752.
- Coghill, J. G. S. (1896). The Hypodermic Use of Guaiacol in Acute Pulmonary Tuberculosis . British Medical Journal, 1 (1836), 586–590.
- Coghill, J. G. S. (1898). Sanatoria for the Open-Air Treatment of Consumption. British Medical Journal, 2 (1959), 206–207.
