= Coral Gunning =

Australian singer

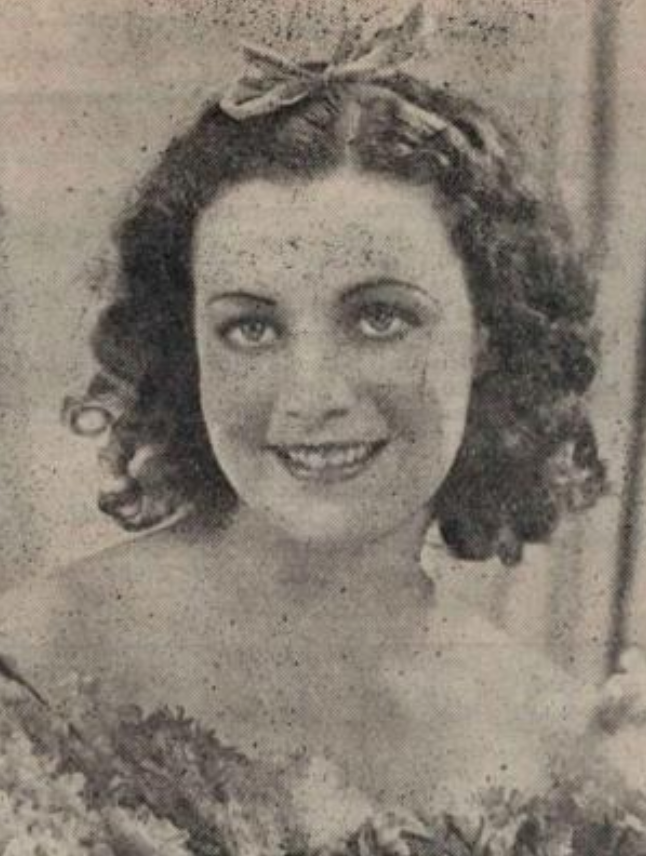
- Coral Gunning, from a 1937 publication
- Born: Coral Tottie Gunning; August 12, 1915; Perth, Australia
- Died: June 25, 1998 (age 82); Perth, Australia
- Occupations: Singer, entertainer

Coral Tottie Gunning (August 12, 1915 – June 25, 1998) was an Australian entertainer. She sang, played musical instruments, and did celebrity impersonations for live audiences, radio broadcasts, and recordings.

== Early life and education ==
Gunning was born in Perth, the daughter of Dudley John Gunning and Violet Mary Gunning. Her mother and grandmother were also entertainers; Gunning and her mother sometimes performed together.

== Career ==
In the 1930s, beginning in her teens, Gunning had a cabaret act, singing, playing accordion, piano, and guitar, and doing impersonations of Hollywood celebrities including Mae West, Greta Garbo, and Janet Gaynor. She won a Melbourne amateur talent contest in 1935, and toured in Australia and internationally through the 1940s and into the 1950s. She also made recordings and performed on radio broadcasts. She appeared in panto shows and a short film in England in 1937, and entertained troops and visited hospitals in Australia and England during World War II. She spent eighteen months performing in India after independence.

Later in life, Gunning founded Music on Wheels, a nonprofit based in Adelaide to encourage lonely people with visiting musicians. "Miss Gunning has donated [the] proceeds of her home and money from many of her antiques collected from hears of world travels towards the financing of Music on Wheels," noted a 1973 profile. She was interviewed by John Robinson for the Musicians' Union of Australia in the 1980s. She donated her papers to the J S Battye Library in 1990.

== Personal life and legacy ==
Gunning died in 1998, at the age of 82, in Perth. The Australian band Original Past Life named a song "Coral Gunning" after her, and recorded other songs based on her life; their 2016 album The Times of Ceylon features an image of Gunning as its cover.
