= John W. Gunning =

American politician

John W. Gunning (May 1, 1847 – November 20, 1910) was an American businessman, mechanic, and politician. He was a member of the Wisconsin State Assembly.

Born in Rochester, New York, Gunning moved to Walworth County, Wisconsin in 1855 and then settled in Friendship, Adams County, Wisconsin. During the American Civil War, Gunning was the chief bugler of the 4th Wisconsin Volunteer Cavalry Regiment. Gunning was a mechanic. He was also in the loan, abstract, real estate, and insurance businesses. Gunning served as a town clerk and register of deeds for Adams County. In 1889, Gunning served in the Wisconsin State Assembly and was a Republican. Gunning died at St. Mary's Hospital in Rochester, Minnesota following surgery.
