= Nevill Coghill (VC) =

Recipient of the Victoria Cross

Nevill Josiah Aylmer Coghill VC
- Born: 25 January 1852; Drumcondra, County Dublin
- Died: 22 January 1879 (aged 26); Buffalo River, South Africa
- Burial place: Natal, South Africa
- Military career
- Allegiance: United Kingdom
- Branch: British Army
- Rank: Lieutenant
- Units: 1st Battalion, 24th Regiment of Foot
- Conflicts: Anglo-Zulu War: Battle of Isandlwana
- Awards: Victoria Cross

Lieutenant Nevill Josiah Aylmer Coghill VC (25 January 1852 – 22 January 1879) was an Irish officer in the British Army and recipient of the Victoria Cross, the highest and most prestigious award for gallantry in the face of the enemy that can be awarded to British and Commonwealth forces.

== Family and early life ==
Born in Drumcondra, Dublin at Belvidere House, Coghill was the eldest son of Sir John Joscelyn Coghill (1826–1905), 4th Baronet, JP, DL, of Drumcondra, County Dublin (see Coghill baronets), and his wife, the Hon. Katherine Frances Plunket, daughter of John Plunket, 3rd Baron Plunket. He was a nephew of David Plunket, 1st Baron Rathmore and William Plunket, 4th Baron Plunket. The painter Sir Egerton Coghill, 5th Baronet was his younger brother and he named his son, Nevill Coghill in his honour. Coghill's nephew became a literary scholar and a member of the Inklings with C. S. Lewis and J. R. R. Tolkien.

Coghill was educated at Haileybury College from 1865 to 1869. In 1876 he set sail with the 24th Regiment of Foot to Cape.

== Battle of Isandlwana ==
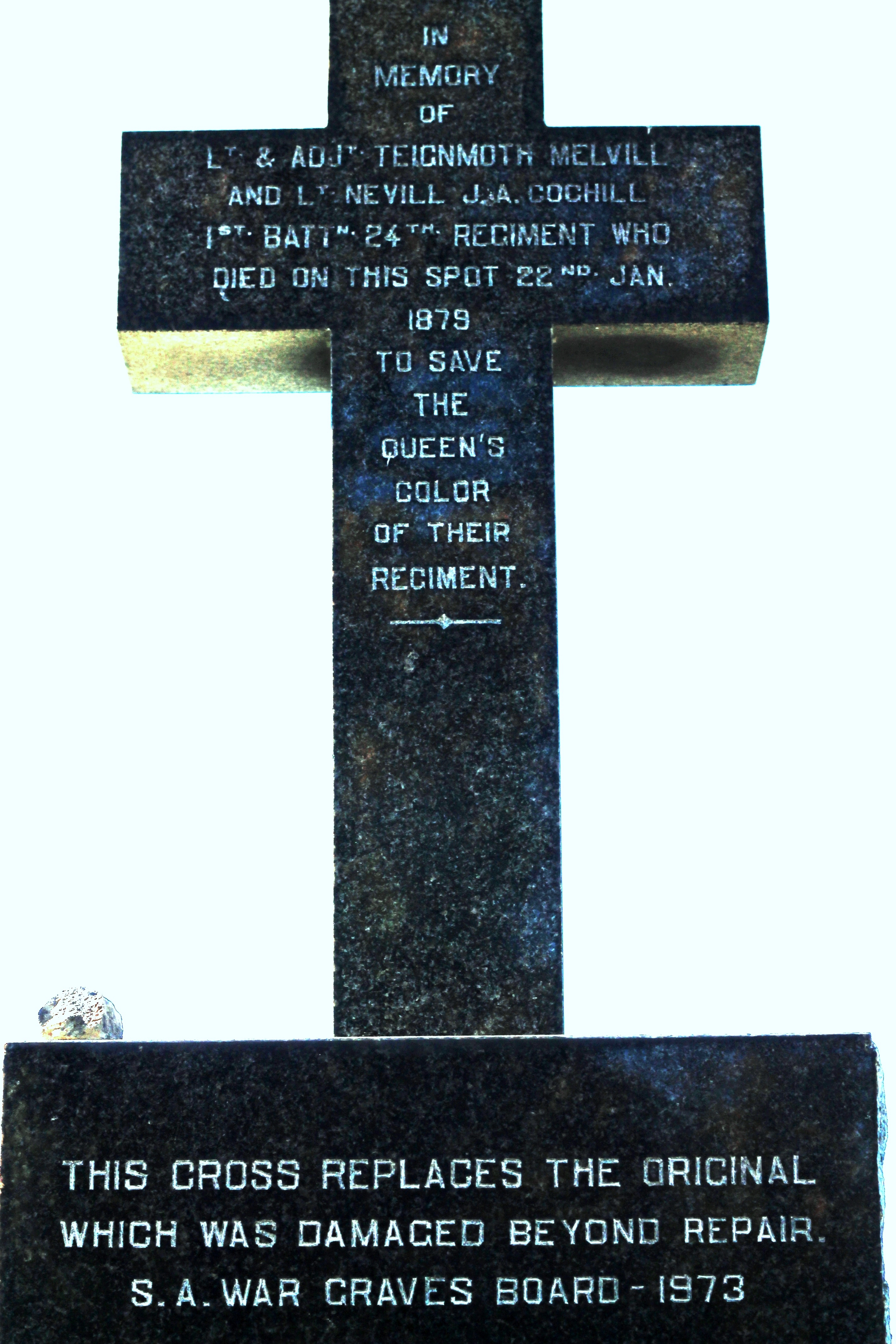
Memorial to Coghill and Melvill

Coghill was twenty-six years old and a lieutenant in the 1st Battalion, 24th Regiment of Foot (2nd Warwickshires), British Army, during the Anglo-Zulu War, when the following deed took place for which he was awarded the VC. He was an orderly officer to Colonel R. T. Glyn, who regarded him as his favourite officer and the son he never had.

On 22 January 1879, after the disaster of the Battle of Isandlwana, South Africa, Lieutenant Coghill joined Lieutenant Teignmouth Melvill who was trying to save the Queen's Colour of the Regiment. They were pursued by Zulu warriors, and while crossing the swollen River Buffalo, Lieutenant Coghill (despite his injured knee) went to the rescue of his brother officer, who had lost his horse and was in great danger. Although Coghill's horse was shot by a Zulu warrior, the valiant soldier swam on to rescue Melvill. After some time, the Colour was swept from their grasp and floated down the bank. After reaching the bank, the two men were eventually overtaken by the Zulu warriors and, following a short struggle, both were killed. Lieutenant Walter Higginson, who was persuaded to escape, heard and witnessed their final actions when they fought to the last. The Colour was retrieved from the river ten days later by a mounted party under Major Wilsone Black.

== Legacy and award of Victoria Cross ==
Two weeks after the battle, Coghill and Melvill's bodies were found by a search party and both buried at Fugitive's Drift. Major-General Dillon informed Coghill's father in a letter, that had it not been for the valour of his son, the Colour would have fallen to Zulu hands. Coghill's father donated his son's trophies including a Zulu shield to the Museum of Science and Art, now the National Museum of Ireland. Coghill and Melvill were amongst the first soldiers to receive the VC posthumously in 1907. Initially The London Gazette mentioned that had they survived they would have been awarded the VC.

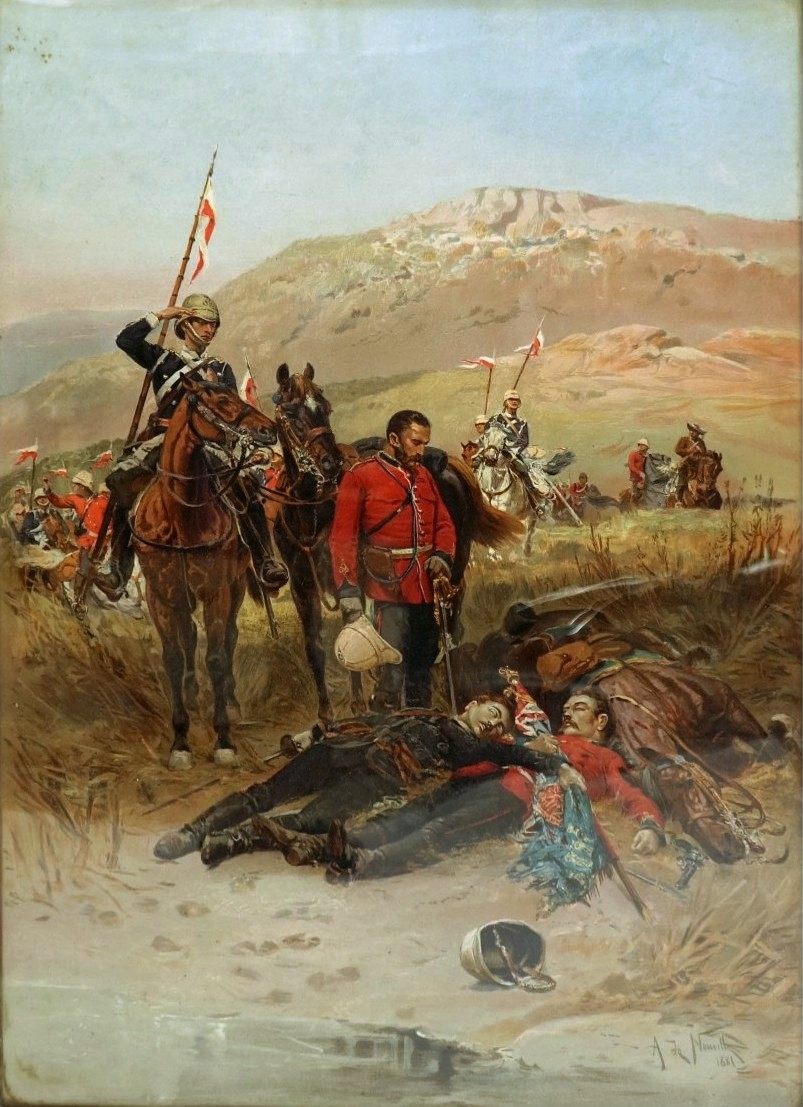
"The Last Sleep of the Brave" the Bodies of Coghill and Melvill are found (an oleograph after Alphonse de Neuville, 1881)

A few months after the Battle of Isandlwana, a French battle artist, Alphonse de Neuville painted Coghill and Melvill's actions when they were pursued by Zulu warriors.

The attempted escape of Melvill and Nevill Coghill was depicted in the 1918 silent film Symbol of Sacrifice. Coghill was portrayed by Christopher Cazenove in the 1979 film Zulu Dawn as a polite and humorous officer. In the film, he is friends with Melvill; their heroic actions when they crossed the Buffalo River in a desperate attempt to return the Queen's Colour back to Natal was depicted in the film.

Coghill's great-great-great-grandniece, Jane Mann, in 2014, passed a painting (of her ancestor and Melvill pursued by Zulus) by contemporary military artist Jason Askew to the Victoria Cross Museum.

The Colour which Coghill and Melvill tried to save was recovered and is on display at Brecon Cathedral in remembrance of their valour as well as other soldiers killed during the battle. Coghill's Victoria Cross is permanently displayed at the Regimental Museum of The Royal Welsh in Brecon, Powys, Wales. At Haileybury College, a leadership programme for pupils in Removes is named in his honour.
