= Marmaduke Coghill =

Member of parliament (Parliament of Ireland)
- Constituency: Dublin University

Personal details
- Born: 1673 Dublin, Ireland
- Died: 1738 (aged 64–65) Dublin
- Education: Trinity College Dublin

Marmaduke Coghill (1673–1738) was a member of the Parliament of Ireland for Dublin University, judge of the Prerogative Court and Chancellor of the Exchequer of Ireland.

== Biography ==
Coghill was born in Dublin, Ireland, the son of John Coghill of Knaresborough, Yorkshire, judge of the prerogative court and one of the masters in chancery. His mother was the daughter of Tobias Cramer, of Ballyfoyle, County Kilkenny. Two elder sisters and a younger brother, James, survived infancy. He spent his childhood in Dublin.

He occupied a prominent place in the life of Dublin, and was remarkable for his early display of ability. At the age of 14, he entered Trinity College Dublin; at the age of 18 he graduated as a bachelor of laws; at the age of 19 he was returned to parliament; and at the age of 26 he became judge of the prerogative court.

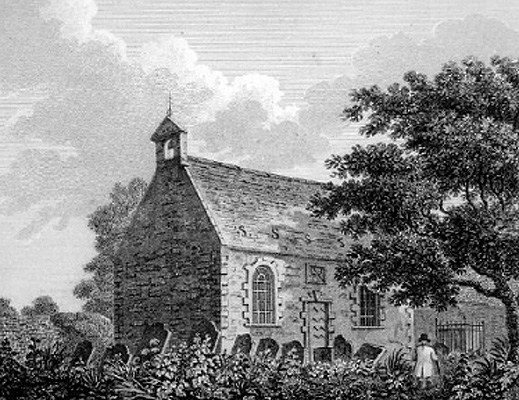
Drumcondra Church, erected to the memory of Coghill, about 1790.

In Parliament, from 1692 to 1713 he was a representative of the borough of Armagh, and from 1713 to his death, in 1739, a representative of Dublin University. He was politically close to William Conolly, speaker of the Irish House of Commons, who died in 1729. Upon Conolly's death, he succeeded him as a commissioner of the revenue. Over the following years, he played a prominent role in parliament, particularly in financial matters. He also built up a close relationship with John Perceval, the British Prime Minister's chief advisor on Irish affairs.

He became Chancellor of the Exchequer in 1735 and was regarded as an honest and able supporter of Irish interests. Outside parliament he was very active on boards, commissions and trusts, took a hand in the building of Dr Steevens' Hospital and was pro-vice-chancellor of Trinity College. He lived in Belvidere House, Drumcondra, now in the grounds of St Patrick's College, Dublin. He suffered from gout for a large part of his life.

From his father Coghill had inherited a lease from the Corporation of lands in Clonturk, where he erected a house which was afterwards known as Drumcondra House. He moved into Drumcondra House and lived there with his sister until his death.

He never married; in his last years, he lived with his unmarried sister Mary. At his death she was left, for her lifetime, his lands in the barony of Coolock, rents from his properties in Clonturk, all his household goods, and his coach, chariot and horses. In 1743, she erected the parish church of Clonturk (now Drumcondra Church), and placed in it a statue of her brother by the Dutch sculptor Peter Scheemakers. He was buried in the family vault in St. Andrew's Church, Andrew St. The tomb was designed by Peter Scheemakers.
