= Coghill baronets =

Set index for Shelley baronets

There have been two baronetcies created for persons with the surname Coghill, both in the Baronetage of Great Britain. As of 2026 one creation is extant.

- Cramer-Coghill baronets, later Coghill baronets of Coghill (1778)
- Coghill baronets of Richings (1781): see Sir John Coghill, 1st Baronet of Richings (died 1785)
