= Gunning baronets =

Title in the Baronetage of Great Britain

Arms of Gunning baronets: Gules, on a fess Erminois, between three doves Argent, as many crosses pattée per pale Gules and Azure

The Gunning Baronetcy, of Eltham in the County of Kent, is a title in the Baronetage of Great Britain. It was created on 3 September 1778 for Robert Gunning, Minister Plenipotentiary to Berlin and St Petersburg.

The second Baronet was Member of Parliament for Wigan, Hastings and East Grinstead while the third Baronet briefly represented Northampton. The seventh Baronet was a Brigadier-General in the British Army. Orlando George Gunning, grandson of Major John Gunning, sixth son of the second Baronet, was also a Brigadier-General in the Army. His son, Sir Orlando Peter Gunning, was knighted for his military and colonial service.

The family name was originally Gonning or Gonnynge and can be traced to the hamlet of Tregonning, Cornwall. Thomas Gunning of Turney's Court, Cold Aston (died 1603) was the ancestor of this branch of the family. The 17th-century clergyman Peter Gunning was another member of the family.

The family seat from 1782 to 1888 was Horton House, Northamptonshire. The eighth baronet and his wife emigrated from England to Peace River, Alberta, Canada in the 1940s. The ninth baronet resided in Ottawa.

== Gunning baronets, of Eltham (1778) ==
- Sir Robert Gunning, 1st Baronet (1731–1816)
- Sir George William Gunning, 2nd Baronet (1763–1823)
- Sir Robert Henry Gunning, 3rd Baronet (1795–1862)
- Sir Henry John Gunning, 4th Baronet (1797–1885)
- Sir George William Gunning, 5th Baronet (1828–1904)
- Sir Frederick Digby Gunning, 6th Baronet (1853–1906)
- Sir Charles Vere Gunning, 7th Baronet (1859–1950)
- Sir Robert Charles Gunning, 8th Baronet (1901–1989)
- Sir Charles Theodore Gunning, 9th Baronet (1935–2020)
- John Joseph Gunning, presumed 10th Baronet (b. 1966) Does not appear on the Official Roll of the Baronetage as of June 2020.

The heir apparent is the present holder's son Matthew Patrick Gunning (b. 2006)

Baronetage of Great Britain
Preceded by Riddell baronets	Gunning baronets of Eltham; 3 September 1778	Succeeded by Jebb baronets
