= Nevill Coghill =

English literary scholar (1899–1980)

Nevill Henry Kendal Aylmer Coghill
- Born: 19 April 1899
- Died: 6 November 1980 (aged 81)
- Citizenship: Anglo-Irish
- Occupation: Literary scholar
- Known for: Modern-English version of The Canterbury Tales
- Father: Egerton Coghill
- Relatives: Nevill Coghill (VC) (uncle); Ambrose Coghill (brother)

Academic background
- Education: Haileybury
- Alma mater: Exeter College, Oxford

Academic work
- Institutions: University of Oxford
- Military career
- Allegiance: United Kingdom
- Service: British Army
- Service years: 1917–1919
- Rank: Second lieutenant
- Unit: Royal Field Artillery
- Conflicts: First World War

Nevill Henry Kendal Aylmer Coghill FRSL (19 April 1899 – 6 November 1980) was an Anglo-Irish literary scholar, known especially for his modern-English version of Geoffrey Chaucer's Canterbury Tales. He was an associate of the literary discussion group the "Inklings", which included J. R. R. Tolkien and C. S. Lewis.

== Early life and education ==
His father was Sir Egerton Coghill, 5th Baronet and his younger brother the actor Ambrose Coghill. Nevill was named after his uncle, Nevill Coghill, who was awarded the Victoria Cross posthumously at the Battle of Isandlwana.

Coghill was educated at Haileybury, and read History and English at Exeter College, Oxford. In 1924, he became a Fellow of the college, a position he held until 1957, and there is a bust of him in the college chapel. He served with the Royal Field Artillery in the First World War from 1917 to 1919 and was commissioned as a second lieutenant in April 1918. In 1927, he married Elspeth Nora Harley, with whom he had a daughter; the marriage was dissolved in 1933. In 1948, he was appointed Professor of Rhetoric in Gresham College. He was Merton Professor of English Literature in the University of Oxford from 1957 to 1966. He died in November 1980, aged 81.

== Later career ==
His Chaucer and Langland translations were first made for BBC radio broadcasts. Coghill was well known during his time as a theatrical producer and director in Oxford; he is noted particularly as the director of the Oxford University Dramatic Society 1949 production of The Tempest. He was an associate of the literary discussion group the "Inklings", which was attended by a number of notable Oxford Dons, including J. R. R. Tolkien and C. S. Lewis, as well as Oxford alumnus Owen Barfield.

In 1968, Coghill collaborated with Martin Starkie to co-write the West-End and Broadway musical Canterbury Tales. The musical was a great success internationally, receiving four Tony nominations. In 1973, the same team collaborated on a sequel, The Homeward Ride, comprising more of Chaucer's Tale.

In a memoir, American academic Reynolds Price writes:

Nevill himself was born in 1899, served in the First War, married, fathered a daughter, then separated from his wife and lived a quietly homosexual life thereafter. He later spoke to me of several romances with men, but he apparently never established a residence with any of them; and until his retirement from Oxford, he always lived in his college rooms.

== Works ==
- The Pardon of Piers Plowman (1945)
- The Masque of Hope (1948)
- Visions from Piers Plowman (1949)
- The Poet Chaucer (1949; 2nd ed. 1967)
- The Canterbury Tales: Translated into Modern English (1952)
- Geoffrey Chaucer (1956)
- Shakespeare's Professional Skills (1964)
- Langland: Piers Plowman (1964)
- Troilus and Criseyde: Translated into Modern English (1971)
- Chaucer's Idea of What Is Noble (1971)
- Collected Papers (1988)
- Doctor Faustus (adaptation), (1967)

== See also ==
- List of Gresham Professors of Rhetoric
