= Archibald Winterbottom =

British Victorian entrepreneur and social reformer (1814–1884)

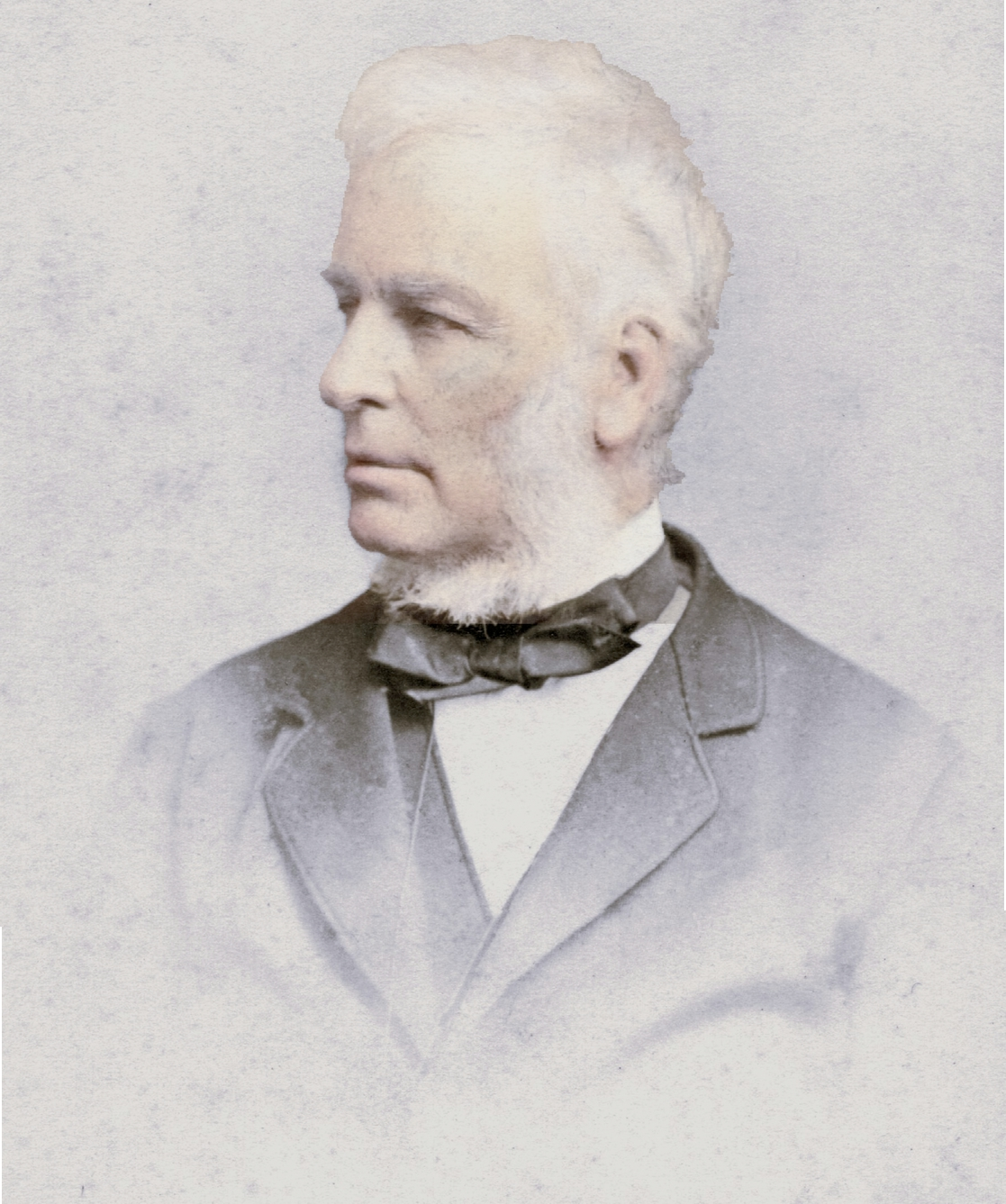
- Archibald Winterbottom, circa 1880
- Born: 1814; Linthwaite, Huddersfield, England
- Died: 18 January 1884 (aged 67–68)
- Education: Home taught; Manchester apprenticeship
- Spouse: Helen E. Woolley (m. 1845)
- Children: Isabella Hannah Winterbottom; Archibald Park Winterbottom; Helen Woolley Winterbottom; William Dickson Winterbottom; George Harold Winterbottom
- Parents: William Whitehead Winterbottom; Isabella Dickson

Archibald Winterbottom (1814 – 18 January 1884) was a British cotton cloth merchant who is best known for becoming the largest producer of bookcloth and tracing cloth in the world. Bookcloth became the dominant bookbinding material in the early 19th century, which was much cheaper and easier to work with than leather, revolutionising the manufacture and distribution of books.

== Early life ==
Winterbottom was born in Linthwaite in the heart of the West Riding of Yorkshire, the son of a third generation wool cloth merchant, William Whitehead Winterbottom (1771–1842) and Isabella (née Dickson, 1784–1849). Not long after, the family moved to the civil parish of Saddleworth, where Winterbottom, at the age of 15, left home in search of his fortune. He reportedly promised his father that, when he obtained a position, he would "do his utmost to succeed".

== Early career ==
In 1829, Winterbottom is said to have walked the 12 miles to Manchester, presumably seeking an apprenticeship, beginning his working life as a clerk with the largest cotton merchants in Manchester (Henry Bannerman & Sons). He remained with Bannerman's for the next twenty-three years, where he learned how to refine cloth to the highest degree and developed different finishes that could be applied to plain cloth. At the age of nineteen, he was appointed to manage their Bradford accounts and to run their Silesia department, patenting a silvery finish lining, which became known as Dacians. Winterbottom was made a partner at Bannerman's aged thirty, which he held for the next nine years.

== Social reformer ==
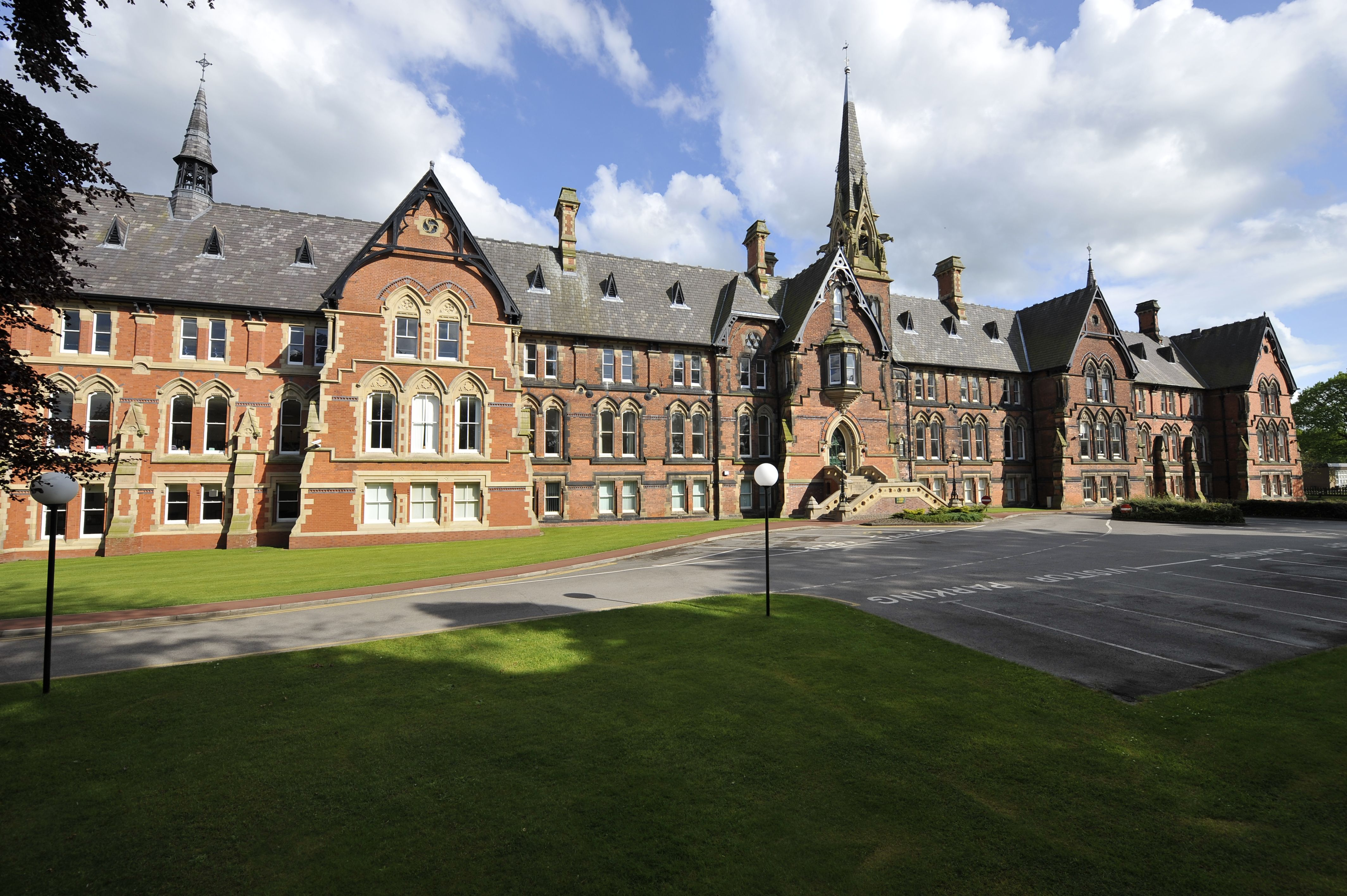
Cheadle Hulme School, (Formerly the Manchester District School for Orphan and Necessitous Children of Warehouseman and Clerks) – Main Building, Front

Manchester was at the heart of the cotton industry in Britain during the 19th century, which was a labour-intensive sector at a time when half of the workforce were children. (Note: Winterbottom himself had been raised as a child in the cloth industry and is likely to have witnessed the difficulties facing working families and the importance of education (which he had received) to break the poverty cycle. He continued to use boys as part of his own labour force until he died.) In 1845, Winterbottom married Helen Woolley, whose family came from a Unitarian tradition. (Note: Archibald Winterbottom married Helen Woolley at Manchester Cathedral, which owned a virtual monopoly on solemnising the marriage ceremony at the time. It is likely that the couple had a separate private ceremony at a Unitarian church of their choice afterwards) At the same time, he became actively involved in the Lancashire Public School Association (LPSA) founded in 1847, which was dominated by Unitarians. By 1852, Winterbottom formed part of a delegation of the National Public School Association (NPA) to present a draft bill to Lord John Russell at 10 Downing Street "for the establishment of non-denominational free schools in England and Wales". He remained active within the NPA, listed as secretary to the general committee on education in 1857, but by 1862, the NPA had achieved some of what it had set out to achieve and was dissolved. Winterbottom went on to work with the newly formed Manchester Educational Aid Society campaigning for compulsory primary education. He spent the rest of his life actively involved in improving child welfare, creating new schools and changing legislation to protect children.

== Entrepreneur ==
By 1851, Winterbottom had a successful career working at Henry Bannerman & Sons, living in a prosperous neighbourhood in the northwest of Manchester. He had been gaining experience in working the machinery needed to create the highest quality bookcloth featuring innovations of his own and, in the same year, he presented his latest bookcloth samples to the Great Exhibition at The Crystal Palace. The following year, Winterbottom retired from the Bannerman partnership to start his own business, taking with him the Dacian patent. (Note: in 1853 to 1854, Winterbottom advertised himself as ARCHD. WINTERBOTTOM and CO apparently solely for the management of the Dacian patent) A few months later, he opened an office in the city centre at Mosley Street, as well as a small factory containing two calendering machines in the Ancoats district, later opening offices in Bradford as well as London, growing a business that thrived for over a hundred years. Initially, he experimented with new designs, winning a prize medal at an exhibition in London in 1862. With competition increasing in the bookcloth sector, Winterbottom argued for improved standards in the way that goods are labelled, a cause championed by his previous partners at Bannerman's.

An embargo on cotton exports from America at the outbreak of the American Civil War triggered a crisis in Lancashire, resulting in mass redundancies and social unrest, attributable as much to mis-management as to supply challenges. (Note: The Crimean War had caused a near eight-fold increase in cotton prices by 1854, followed by boom years for the industry in 1859–60 resulting in over production and an overabundance of raw cotton held in warehouses in Lancashire. Britain became flooded with finished goods at a time of a contracting world market.) The embargo created a five-fold increase in cotton prices at a time when the market was already flooded with finished goods, causing it to collapse. Winterbottom had managed to continue trading throughout the crisis, which left him with large debts. (Note: Winterbottom declared debts amounting to £9 million in today's money.) By 1869, he was forced to report the failure of his business to his creditors, who met to agree refinancing, accepting an offer of 50% market value on his assets to raise fresh capital. (Note: It is thought that Winterbottom sold his property to raise extra cash and moved to rented accommodation in Manchester with his wife by August. His children may have been sent to boarding school in Brighton at this time)

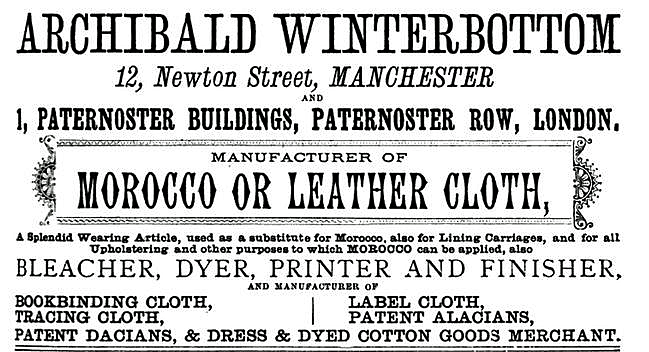
Winterbottom operated under the name of Archibald Winterbottom (Co.) – advertisement circa. 1880

Supported by his Bradford creditors, Winterbottom sought to increase market share and searched for larger premises. In 1874, he purchased and refurbished Victoria Mills, (Note: Victoria Mills was located in Weaste, Pendleton, which was the beating heart of the bookcloth industry for decades. Winterbottom added new buildings to the complex housing new machinery and improved boilers, erecting one of the tallest chimneys in Lancashire) (Note: Winterbottom negotiated the transfer of Victoria Mills from its previous owner Friedrich Engels. The two men shared much in common where social reform was concerned, if not politics. That social conscience continued through the Winterbottom family until at least Archibald's grandson, Ian Winterbottom, Baron Winterbottom) making him the leading cloth producer of bookcloth and tracing cloth in England (ibid.), opening new storage premises at 43, Fountain Street adjacent to the warehouse occupied by Bannerman & Sons in the city centre. In 1879, Winterbottom created an Imperial Trade Mark for tracing cloth, which became the global benchmark for quality. (Note: Tracing cloth made from cotton was the fore-runner to tracing paper used in the 19th century for the professional reproduction of decorative patterns, maps and technical drawings. Tracing cloth provided Winterbottom with a stable revenue stream, which kept the business solvent while bookcloth prices fluctuated in response to fierce competition) The Victoria Mills complex was gradually expanded, making him the largest producer of bookcloth and tracing cloth in the world. In the same year, he brought his two surviving sons into the business and in 1881, a new office was established in Newton Street, an address that was to become synonymous with the bookcloth industry. By 1882, he was in a position to pay back all his creditors with full compound interest. Two years later, he died quite suddenly at his house in Pendleton, (Note: Winterbottom lived in a modest red brick semi-detached house in Eccles Old Road, despite being a multi-millionaire in today's money (probate indicates circa. £20 million)) but not before he had assured his own legacy.

== Legacy ==
Winterbottom created a business that lasted over a hundred years, which found a place on the bookshelves of every middle-class household in Britain, while providing the means for educating those less fortunate. Much of that wealth generation was in creating patents, but as orders increased (4,000 customers) and the volume of different patterns soared (50,000), the staggering number of permutations prompted Winterbottom to create an innovative indexed codification system. (Note: the codification system, which grew as new grade, grain, cloth type, embossed design and colour were introduced, is still being debated today, as the industry struggles with standardisation.) The code tracked customer details, orders, stocks, materials, invoicing and delivery. By creating index tables in much the same way as relational tables are structured in databases today, meant that customers only had to register their names and addresses once (unique identifier) and the system took care of the orders. Once staff had been trained in its application, inventories were augmented, suppliers were paid and orders were delivered on time. An attempt was made to replace Winterbottom's system with an expensive computer in the 1950s but the attempt failed and the company was forced to revert to his original code (ibid.). (Note: 1950s databases were predominantly hierarchical, not capable using a key table to cross reference attributes linking customers with stock)

Arguably Winterbottom's greatest but least remembered legacy was his commitment to child education. He was directly and indirectly involved in the reformation of public education in England and Wales through legislative reform. It was also through his work with children and young men that he came in to contact with luminaries of the time, such as the poet Charles Swain, who dedicated his last book of poetry to him. Schools in Manchester then and today, such as the Manchester Free School and the Manchester District School for Orphan and Necessitous Children of Warehouseman and Clerks, owed their existence in part to the dedication of men like Winterbottom. He was president of the Unitarian Home Missionary College the year before he died.

There were two occasions in Winterbottom's life, however, when his actions did achieve national attention, prompting scores of newspaper articles that had little to do with Winterbottom's own notability. Firstly in 1863, when he challenged the Earl of Derby’s right to deny public access to a well and an ancient footpath that went across Derby's land. (Note: the story ran at least 60 times from 23 June to 7 July 1866 from Ireland and across England – wide publication may well have been politically motivated aimed at the Earl himself, who was then in Government and was forced to back down) The ruling in Winterbottom's favour was so popular in Manchester that he gave lecture tours for entertainment. The second was in 1882, when Winterbottom paid back his creditors, which was repeated a year later when the same creditors presented him with an extravagant 3-foot high silver centre-piece, featuring Sabrina, the Goddess of the River Severn, flanked by a pair of massive candelabra. (Note: this story ran at least 100 times from 23 October 1882 to 28 February 1883 from across the United Kingdom (England, Ireland, Scotland and Wales) – the wording generally presents a Victorian exemplar of public morality, a popular theme in Victorian society)

Winterbottom was interred in the family vault at the Unitarian Chapel in Stand.
