= Gerald Case =

British actor (1905–1985)

Thomas Gerald Case (26 Jan 1905 – 22 May 1985) was a British stage, film and television character actor, known, amongst others, for his role in the 1976 Wodehouse Playhouse episode, Strychnine in the Soup.

== Early life ==
Case was born at Horton Hall, the son of Captain Thomas Elphinstone Case of the Coldstream Guards and Evelyn Ruby, daughter of Adolphus Ferguson and Minnie Byron, a mezzo-soprano celebrated for her stage roles in variety and Victorian burlesques. At the age of 6, his father died and Case himself moved into Horton Hall, (Note: Thomas and Evelyn Case lived at The Temple in Horton Park, which was in the gift of Evelyn’s step-father George Harold Winterbottom) with his 10-year-old aunt. (Note: Case and his half-aunt Betty Winterbottom were young companions in the vast corridors of Horton, creating a bond that was to last for the rest of their lives (Betty's mother Minnie Byron was Case's grandmother)) Case's widowed mother subsequently married the England cricketer and gold medal-winning Olympic boxer J. W. H. T. Douglas.

At the age of eighteen, Case was encouraged to join his step-father's family business in the timber industry, travelling to Finland as the company agent. (Note: There was no conscription in the United Kingdom in the 1920s but Case had an association with the officers of the Bedfordshire and Hertfordshire Regiment, which was lasting.) Finland in the mid-1920s had recently won independence from Russia, resulting in civil war. Case learnt to speak Finnish and served in the Finnish White Army but is unlikely to have seen active service. Case returned to England in 1928 convinced that the timber trade was not for him and announced that he wanted to go on stage, which he did, for more than 50 years.

== Acting career ==
It is unknown whether Case actually attended drama school, but his first stage appearance was in 1929 at Camberwell Palace playing any small part that he could find. He claimed that he hated minor roles at the outset but every small part that he performed, he made sure that he was good in it, which gradually created his brand. Case got his first real break in October when he joined Jack Denton’s theatre company who were touring with a domestic drama Stop the Wedding!. Case played the part of the villain 'Dudley Cliffstone', which he continued until 1930, when he changed touring company to play 'Paul Cairns' in the crime drama Sexton Blake opposite Erica Tozer. In April 1931, Case and Tozer moved to a new repertory company working out of the Kings Theatre, Southsea and the Royal County Theatre, Reading. They were married 7 months later, playing opposite each other in The Fake. (Note: Case and Tozer were married in London with a luncheon reception to give them time to return to Reading in the afternoon to perform "The Fake" at 7:30 the same evening. Case exchanged the clothing of the bridegroom in life with those of the bridegroom on stage in the same day. Their marriage was far from fake however, as they remained together for the rest of their lives.) A few weeks later, they appeared together on stage as a married couple in a farcical whodunnit called The Barton Mystery, in which Case dreams that he has murdered his wife, reportedly performed by both to dramatic effect.

Case continued to work on stage throughout the 1930s with, or without his wife, in rep or the West End, sometimes in leading roles, but more often supporting. Case began working in feature films appearing first in 1933, initially in uncredited minor roles (e.g. Sorrell and Son, Action for Slander and Dark Journey). His first starring role was at Pinewood Studios, Paramount's Museum Mystery, (Note: called Museum Peace pre-production) in which he appeared alongside Elizabeth Inglis. The film was not a great success with the critics but as war in Europe approached, Case's stage and screen persona found a place in propaganda films, such as The Lion Has Wings. Case was exempt from conscription in 1939, working in collaboration with the Ministry of Information, where he worked with Noël Coward on In Which We Serve, a British patriotic war film. Case went on a 25-week tour (1942 - 1943) with Coward around wartime Britain playing to home troops, bringing the West End to the provinces with premier performances of This Happy Breed and Present Laughter, as well as a revival of Blythe Spirit. The tour advertised collectively as "Noël Coward in his Play Parade". After playing in twenty-two towns and cities in England, Scotland and Wales, the tour ended with a six-week run at the Haymarket.

In 1943, Case focused more on his film career playing Westmorland in Laurence Olivier's epic film adaptation of William Shakespeare's Henry V. (Note: Henry V was propaganda film partly funded by the Government made as a morale-booster for British troops fighting World War II and was released to coincide with the Allied invasion of Normandy and push into France.) The following year he made a brief appearance in Gabriel Pascal's Caesar and Cleopatra and for the next 18 years, he appeared in 2-3 films a year, some uncredited, mostly in supporting roles in features but also starring in B movies, (Note: most notably playing Inspector Carron in The Candlelight Murder and The Night Plane to Amsterdam, which ran for years in cinemas around Britain) or films for television (Note: like Captain Maitland in The Middle Watch (although he played a different role in the stage version in 1973), or Captain Woolcot in the BBC mini-series Seven Little Australians.) (below). Case continued working on the stage, (Note: Case worked at the Q Theatre in 1949, playing in a revival of his earlier role in Noël Coward's Present Laughter (without Noël Coward this time). Following a period in rep at Windsor and Southsea, Case worked again with Noël Coward in 1954 performing Coward's favourite Blithe Spirit, continuing to appear on stage intermittently until 1973.) but he was defined by his screen roles as a character actor, playing calm, trustworthy and dependable contemporary characters, characteristically senior police detectives with the occasional doctor, military officer or vicar. His screen persona crossed over into television which really took off in the 1960s, making guest appearances in all the major shows of the day from Dr. Finlay's Casebook to Morecambe and Wise. (Note: Case made guest appearances in 86 television shows between 1951 and 1982.) Case had always played comic roles from his earliest days on stage with Noël Coward and later on screen sending up characters he was most respected for in familiar drama roles. (Note: e.g. The Navy Lark, Doctor in Charge and Bernie) His prolific screen visibility meant that he was rarely out of work in fifty years of acting, (Note: "They always send for me when somebody’s getting married in Crossroads and they need a vicar".) but his last big screen performance was in 1980 in The Elephant Man.

=== Partial Credited Filmography ===
- Museum Mystery (1937) - Peter Redding
- The Lion Has Wings (1939) - Unnamed Character
- Cottage to Let (1941) - Squadron Leader Weston
- In Which We Serve (1942) – Captain Jasper Fry
- Henry V (1944) - Earl of Westmoreland
- Read All About It (1945) - Oliver
- Think it Over (1945 short) - Brigade Major
- Night Boat to Dublin (1946) - Inspector Emerson
- I See a Dark Stranger (1946) - Colonel Dennington
- The Ringer (1946) - Colonel Walford (for television)
- The Middle Watch (1946) - Captain Maitland (for television)
- Jean's Plan (1946) - Inspector of Police
- A Cup of Kindness (1947) - Jim Finch (for television)
- Dear Murderer (1947) - Police Constable Simms
- When the Bough Breaks (1947) - Doctor
- Counsel's Opinion (1949) - Hotel Manager (for television)
- Man on the Run (1949) - Constable on Waterloo Bridge
- Now Barabbas (1949) - King
- Landfall (1949) - S / Ldr. Peterson
- Meet Simon Cherry (1949) - Dr. Smails
- The Man in Black (1949) - Doctor
- The Gay Adventure (1949) - 1st Military Policeman
- Golden Arrow (1949) - 1st Military policeman
- The Dancing Years (1950) - Rudi's Secretary
- No Highway in the Sky (1951) - Inquiry board member
- Assassin for Hire (1951) - Detective Sgt. Stott
- Cloudburst (1951) - Doctor
- Hunted (1952) - Deputy Assistant Commissioner
- Home at Seven (1952) - Sergeant Evans
- Wide Boy (1952) - Detective Sgt Stott
- The Fake (1953) - Peter Randall
- The Candlelight Murder (1953 short) - Superintendent Carron
- Final Appointment (1954) - Australian Official
- The Night Plane to Amsterdam (1955 short) - Inspector Carron
- Lady of Vengeance (1957) - Hawley
- The Flying Scot (1957) - Guard
- Barnacle Bill (1957) - Commander
- The Safecracker (1958) - Car Salesman
- Rockets Galore! (1958) - R.A.F. Officer
- The Carringford School Mystery (1958) - Mr. Ashworth
- Horrors of the Black Museum (1959) - Bookshop Manager
- A Touch of Larceny (1960) - Club Member
- Bomb in the High Street (1963) - Ventry
- Accidental Death (1963) - Police Inspector Ventry
- The Third Secret (1964) - Mr. Bickes
- Runaway Railway (1966) - Lord Chalk's assistant
- Vampyres (1974) - Estate Agent
- The Elephant Man (1980) - Lord Waddington

== Legacy ==
Case acted in an era when ephemeral stage performances transferred to permanent film or television media. Despite a substantial body of stage work, Case is remembered for his prolific film and television appearances.

Case lived with his wife Erica at Mayfield, Windlesham, Surrey, where he died on 22 May 1985.
