= George Harold Winterbottom =

British business magnate and gentleman farmer (1861–1934)

George Harold Winterbottom JP
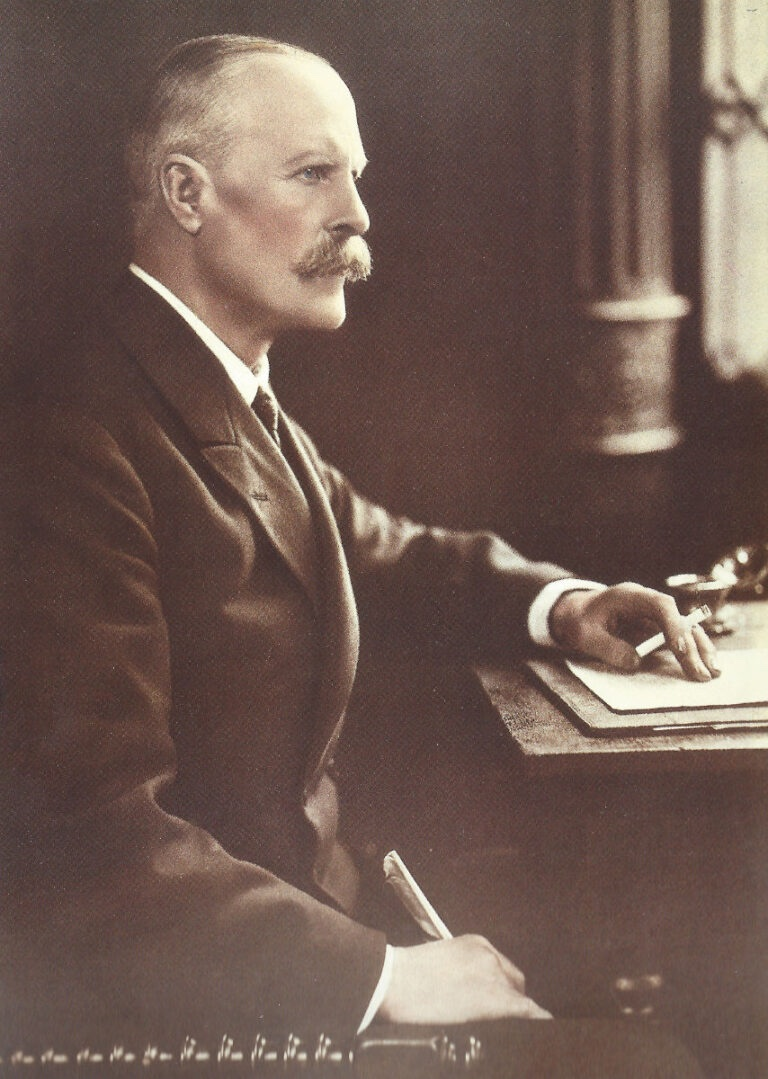
- Born: 1861; Bury, Greater Manchester England
- Died: 15 November 1934 (aged 72–73); Horton Hall, Northamptonshire
- Spouse: Louisa Elizabeth Ferguson "Minnie" (née Babb) (m. 1891; died 1901) Georgina McLeod (m. 1913)
- Children: George Harold Winterbottom Jr; Oscar Dunstan Winterbottom; Dudley Dickson Winterbottom; Louise Elizabeth Helen Winterbottom; Ian Winterbottom; Alistair Winterbottom
- Parents: Archibald Winterbottom; Helen Woolley

George Harold Winterbottom (1861 – 15 November 1934) was an Edwardian business magnate, who dominated global bookcloth manufacture for bookbinding, making him "one of the wealthiest men of England". Bookcloth took over from more expensive materials like silk and leather as the dominant hardcover bookbinding material in the early 19th century, revolutionising the manufacture and distribution of books. Winterbottom seized the opportunity to effectively monopolise the production and supply of high quality bookcloth, which facilitated a country life for himself as a gentleman farmer and philanthropist.

== Early life ==
Winterbottom was born in Bury in 1861, the youngest son of Archibald Winterbottom, a self-made entrepreneur from a Huddersfield wool milling family, and Helen (née Woolley), daughter of a Mancunian cotton manufacturer. There is some uncertainty where Winterbottom was educated, (Note: It has been suggested that Winterbottom was educated in Brighton, but this has yet to be independently verified. Winterbottom did play cricket for Western aged 16, which was located on Eccles Old Road near to where his family lived.) but at the age of seventeen, he was apprenticed to the family business (Archibald Winterbottom (Co.)) with his older brother William.

== Business magnate ==
In 1879 Winterbottom began his apprenticeship in his father's cotton mill, Victoria Mills. According to contemporary accounts, it was clear from the outset that he was determined to learn everything possible about bookcloth production, which was to prove crucial in running the company when his father died five years later. Following two years of direct tutelage from his father, Winterbottom was brought formally into the family business with his brother William Dickson Winterbottom in 1881. When Archibald Winterbottom died in 1884, the brothers continued to run Archibald Winterbottom (Co.) as executors until probate was released in 1887, and Archibald Winterbottom and Sons (AW&S) was created. Winterbottom focused his attention on stabilising the bookcloth market and exploring new business, while his brother consolidated existing production, principally from Victoria Mills.

=== The Winterbottom Book Cloth Company ===
Intense competition between bookcloth manufacturers in what was a relatively small market, had been building in Britain long before AW&S was formed. Bookcloth production from Victoria Mills was strong but uneconomic as a result of severe downward pressure on prices caused by the intense competition. Winterbottom opened negotiations with his three main rivals at the peak of the price war in 1885, in an effort to control pricing by creating a syndicate, while maintaining overall production quality. (Note: today, this would be called a cartel. The practice of achieving a virtual monopoly by price-fixing in this way, though not unusual for the time, is considered anti-competitive today, in opposition to modern competition law) After years of damaging predatory pricing, the remaining companies were struggling to survive but it was an uneven struggle as AW&S losses from the bookcloth business were to some extent offset by their thriving tracing cloth business. (Note: Tracing cloth made from cotton was the fore-runner to tracing paper used in the 19th century for the professional reproduction of decorative patterns, maps and technical drawings. Tracing cloth had provided Winterbottom with a stable revenue stream, which kept the business solvent while bookcloth prices fluctuated in response to fierce competition as it had for his father decades before) By 1890, Winterbottom had managed to align a syndicate to control prices consisting of the top four bookcloth companies, including some smaller operators in England. But Winterbottom saw an opportunity to extend his reach beyond Britain, turning his attention to the United States and to Germany as potential export markets. He travelled in the same year to both countries, taking out patents for book binders' cloth even though bookcloth production was already thriving in both countries (ibid.).

In 1891, thirty-eight years after the launch of their father's bookcloth business, Winterbottom had absorbed nine of his business competitors in England, the US and Germany by merging them into The Winterbottom Book Cloth Company Ltd. (WBCC), installing himself as chairman. At the age of thirty in the space of four years, with ruthless efficiency, Winterbottom had ensured that The WBCC dominated bookcloth trade in Britain and America for the next century and that his brand became the global standard for bookbinding.

Companies merged into the Winterbottom Book Cloth Co. Ltd. after 1892 and their assets
Company	Independent since (Note: or the latest date that these companies have been cited as independent entities, which may well be significantly earlier, particularly if there had been a change in name)	Assets (Mills)	Asset Location
Archibald Winterbottom & Sons	1887	Victoria Mills	Salford
Samuel Dewhurst & Co. Ltd.	1831	Broughton Dye Works	Salford
Wilson & Bentleys	1884	Hoxton Dyeing and Finishing Works	Hoxton
	1891?	Hackney Wick Works (Note: Hackney Wick Bleaching, Dyeing and Finishing Works)	Hackney Wick
Law, Sons & Co.	1880	Foots Cray Mill	Foots Cray
John H. Gartside & Co. Ltd.	1874	Chapel Hill Cotton Mill	Dukinfield
	1887	Buckton Vale Works	Stalybridge
Samuel Barlow & Co. Ltd.	1883	Stakehill Works	Castleton, Greater Manchester
WRC Goulden & Co.	1891	Pendleton Mills	Pendleton, Greater Manchester
JJ Weber & Co.	1891	Bamberg Works	Bamberg
Interlaken Mills	1883	Interlaken Mills	Arkwright, Rhode Island

==== United States bookcloth production ====
Since its inception in 1823, the introduction of bookcloth in the US was largely synchronous with England's, facilitated in the US by the introduction of case construction methods of bookbinding, which led to progressive mechanisation. But the US continued throughout the 19th century to depend on England for imported bookcloth from companies that included, among others, Archibald Winterbottom (Co.). (Note: ironically, the raw material (cotton) was exported from the US, processed into bookcloth in England, and re-imported at a rate that undercut local production) Local manufacturers of bookcloth like the Staten Island Dye Works, (Note: also known as the New York Dyeing and Printing Establishment) began producing bookcloth sometime before 1877 but were forced out of the bookcloth business in 1883 by cheaper imports from England. Staten Island Dye Works reverted to only dyeing but were keen to return to bookcloth and wrote to Winterbottom in 1890 to offer a partnership. The offer was declined, however, as Winterbottom was already making moves of his own in the US.

Following the failure of the bookcloth industry in the US in 1883, the United States Government formed the view that it was desirable for the American book trade to have at least one local supplier of bookcloth. This view was supported by a group of New England cotton merchants, who opened Interlaken Mills, in Arkwright, Rhode Island with the express intent of supplying bookcloth to the local printing and bookbinding industry. As production began, Interlaken Mills gradually obtained an increasing share in the US market for bookcloth, threatening the dominance of importation from Winterbottom. By the end of the decade, Interlaken Mills though dominant, was being undercut by local merchants with inferior quality bookcloth.

Rather than engaging in another damaging price war like that in England, Winterbottom decided to bring Interlaken Mills into his emerging syndicate. In 1890, he filed two patents in the US for bookbinders' cloth as the assignee on behalf of AW&S. Winterbottom then travelled to America and bought Interlaken Mills, (Note: Winterbottom disembarked in New York on the 12th of December, 1890 but didn't seal the deal until the following February.) in an apparently amicable takeover, which allowed Interlaken to continue trading under its own name with its own board of directors. Winterbottom himself became very friendly with Interlaken managers and their families (ibid.), visiting every two to three years from 1892 to 1913, accompanied by his wife Minnie in the early years, building a mutually beneficial relationship between British and US operations, which endured for eighty years, long after Winterbottom himself had died.

Winterbottom continued to grow and consolidate the business in Rhode Island, fending off competition in 1904 with record sales over the next ten years, earning him large sums of money. Twenty-two years after having taken over operations in America, Winterbottom booked passage with a group of friends to New York aboard Titanic but was delayed by business at home, forcing him to postpone his passage by a week. Winterbottom travelled to New York aboard Adriatic on 18 April 1912, three days after Titanic had gone down with the loss of 1,500 lives. Adriatic returned to Liverpool on the 2nd of May with some of the surviving crew and management of Titanic.

=== Consolidation ===
Bringing operations from the US and Germany into the WBCC corporate group resulted in a near global monopoly, which stabilised prices but risked the disaffection of book manufacturers who had previously been able to shop around to get the best price for their businesses. Winterbottom took a conciliatory approach to dissent, visiting customers to negotiate deals and easing them into compliance. Lawyers were also kept busy ensuring that partners remained aligned, making minor changes to the original agreement or by threatening his larger partners with his own resignation.

Winterbottom would tolerate no compromise on quality control, with all production standards set by Victoria Mills, which were subsequently applied to the ten other factories in the Group. Significant investment in new machinery and changes in production methods were required at Interlaken Mills and the Bamberg Works, keeping up with emerging technologies and markets, while maintaining strict quality control. Winterbottom's uncompromising attention to detail and rejection of new stock that didn't measure up, ensured consistency within all the Group's operations. This was not always easy to apply, particularly in Germany, (Note: The Bamberg works by 1902 was called Bleicherei: "Bleicherei Färberei und Appretur-Anstalt AG. Geschäftsbericht") where he was forced to make changes to staffing to ensure strict compliance with his restrictive confidentiality controls, which preserved corporate intellectual property rights and enforce strict competitive intelligence protocols. (Note: Much of what Winterbottom did was highly restrictive, like installing locked iron doors to ensure that only company directors could move freely about the plants)

Exports made a vital contribution to Winterbottom's net income. By the turn of the century, a quarter of the WBCC’s customers were from overseas, with bookcloth and tracing cloth exports from Salford going to at least 50 countries. (Note: including Austria-Hungary, the Netherlands, Ireland, Scotland, Canada, West in dies, Japan, Korea, Persia Syria and Australia) The US Government commissioned a study on the industry in 1899 and found that world trade was divided largely between Winterbottom and two or three German firms, who also sourced their best grades from Manchester. Following fifteen years securing world markets through forging new alliances and mergers, in which the merger had restored profitability to the industry while returning huge net profits year-on-year, Winterbottom had restored substantial profitability to his production, and could step back from the business and consider a change of pace. As chairman and managing director of WBCC, he continued to fend off competition, either by acquiring the competitor or by putting them out of business and buying their patents. World War I presented Winterbottom with personal as well as business challenges, particularly to his German assets, but he maintained his global pre-eminence, creating new companies such as the Manchester Book Cloth Company, to take advantage of new markets and new technology in water proofing, (Note: Winterbottom was personally responsible for the development and introduction of Imperial Bookcloth and a patent out on new moisture-resistant bookcloth made of viscose in 1909) as well as new synthetic materials.

== Gentleman farmer ==
In the late 1880s Winterbottom frequently travelled to London from Manchester, securing deals to underpin his growing global interests. Over the same period that he was confronting business adversaries with ruthless efficiency around the world, he was also pushing for social reform closer to home, providing medical care for the poor, arguing in public for improved conditions for workers and their families. In 1887 while in London, he started an affair with Louisa Elizabeth Ferguson (née Babb), (Note: Minnie's husband, Adolphus Ferguson, had abandoned her and their two children the previous year for the lure of gold in Canada. Though deserted by her husband, Minnie was still married until they secured a divorce in 1891.) better known in the West End by her stage name Minnie Byron, a Mezzo Soprano celebrated for her stage roles in variety and Victorian burlesques. Two years later, they had their first son together, George Harold Ferguson, followed by a second, Oscar, in 1891. Winterbottom and Minnie married immediately after her divorce from Ferguson came through at the end of 1891 and a third son Dudley was born in 1892. Winterbottom sought to hide the illegitimacy of their first two sons by having all three christened "Winterbottom" in a remote country parish outside of Poynton where he was living in 1894. As far as society at large was concerned, Winterbottom was married to Louisa Elizabeth Ferguson in 1887, effectively concealing any hint of scandal.

Winterbottom and Minnie spent the next ten years alternating between living in London and Manchester, (Note: Harold lived in the same street as his father, at Beech House, 59 Eccles Old Road with his mother and sister. By 1897, the growing Winterbottom family moved to The Towers in Didsbury, six miles from the centre of Manchester, which they rented. Minnie continued performing on stage in Manchester, but preferred living in London.) and travelling together for extended breaks to the US in 1892, 1894 and 1896 aboard Majestic. By 1898, the couple had found their future home: a boarding school in Northamptonshire whose lease was coming up for renewal. In 1899, Winterbottom purchased Horton Hall and together, they set about adding a new wing, and completely re-furbished the interior. (Note: It is likely that Minnie had been involved in every part of the project to purchase and refurbish the house) Minnie gave birth to a daughter in London on 18 March 1901, but died of puerperal fever 10 days later. Winterbottom was traumatised by her death and dedicated himself to completing their dream at Horton in her memory. (Note: Minnie was buried 18 months after she died at the churchyard in Horton next to the main house; Winterbottom mourned her for the rest of his life, keeping a string of pearls belonging to her next to his body until he died.) A single parent with the responsibility for six children, (Note: Two children from Minnie's previous marriage to Adolphus Ferguson plus the four they had together) as well as a stately home of some 4,000 acres, (Note: By 1927, Winterbottom employed 14 resident domestic staff, 14 resident gardeners and 60 farm labourers.) landlord to tenant farms and the villages of Horton, Hackleton, Piddington and Preston Deanery, Winterbottom created a new life for himself as a gentleman farmer, moving his family to Horton as early as May 1902, where his daughter was christened.

Winterbottom opened his gates to the general public in May 1902 for the first of many charity fêtes and galas to be held at Horton Park, which became annual events by 1930. He immersed himself in local administration, sitting on committees, organising and hosting charity events, (Note: most of the events were charities linked to relief for the poor such as serving on the committee and chairing the Manchester Eye and Ear Hospital 1889 until closure in 1906, and thereafter to the Manchester Royal Infirmary; Secretary to the Providence Society 1906; relief for striking miners; famine in India;) in support of the well-being of his tenantry and those who worked directly for him, (Note: Chairman and principle donor for the Bookbinders' Pension and Asylum Society; builds a beautiful Village Hall at Hackleton; President of the British Legion;) and was actively involved in local politics (as a free-trader), (Note: was a Liberal in politics; manager of Co-operative Society and later co-operative party of St. Helens 1893, to 1904 as General Manager; standing for local elections in 1902 as Co-operative candidate; a strong advocate of free-trade;) with strong ties to his Unitarian upbringing. Winterbottom was elected High Sheriff of Northamptonshire in 1906, elected a Magistrate in the same year, sitting on the Grand Jury of Assizes for Northamptonshire, to which he was re-elected every year until his last, and was elected President of the Citizens' Corps at the outbreak of war in 1914.

In 1913, 12 years after the death of his first wife, Winterbottom married Georgina McLeod, the daughter of a Scottish cleric, and had two more sons, Ian (who became a Labour Party MP and peer) and Alistair.

=== Agriculture ===
In 1902 Winterbottom set about turning his land into a viable business with the same vigour he had applied to bookcloth by studying agriculture. He began by selling off excess woodland and by breeding Shire horses from his own stables, which he continued for the rest of his life. By 1909, with his eye for quality control, Winterbottom's sheep were producing more than 500 fleeces per year, fetching the highest prices in the county. By 1913, he diversified into cattle, choosing carefully selecting Friesian stock for milk production. During World War I as part of the war effort, he was able to sell off excess livestock and began ramping up wheat production, making up for a shortage of labour by innovating new machinery imported from America. At the end of the war, he expanded his Friesian breed, making Winterbottom a household name among breeders with his two celebrated herds. Apart from an unknown number of tenant farms, in 1927, Winterbottom employed 60 full-time farm workers on his land.

== Legacy ==
As a child, Winterbottom had always been a keen sportsman, playing cricket at school, at County level since his early twenties, and as an "Old Player" at Horton, sponsoring annual matches with the local constabulary. In 1908, Winterbottom donated a cricket ground and built a thatched pavilion for the newly formed Horton House Cricket Club, which thrives today, a living legacy. As a child, he also had a strong artistic flair and had apparently wanted to pursue a career as a painter, which was denied to him. Instead, he supported other artists with commissions, most notably a sequence of large murals by Frank Brangwyn for Horton Hall, most of which are now on public display at the Dunedin Public Art Gallery, and which continue to mystify and intrigue art historians.

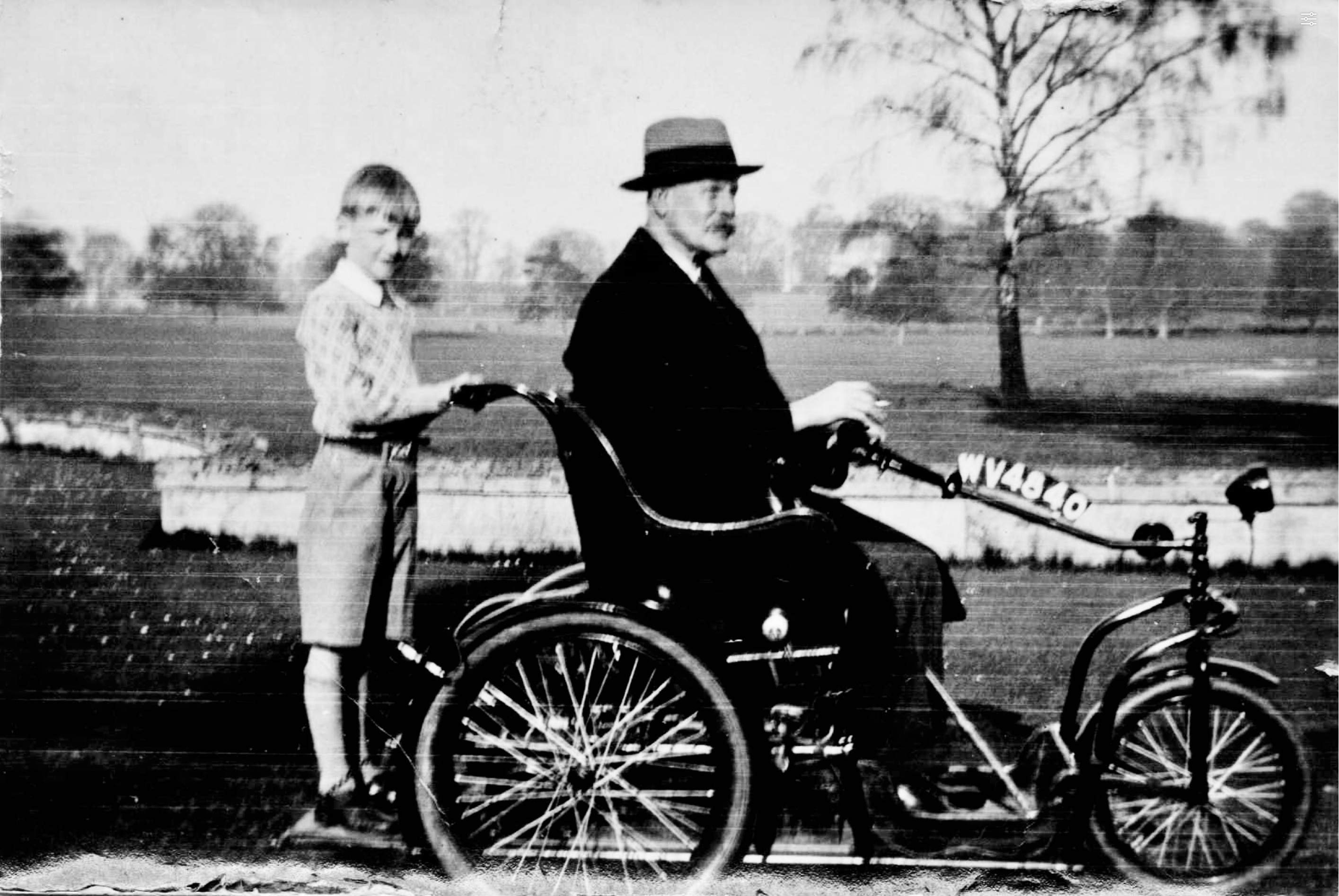
Winterbottom cruising around Horton Park in a self-driving chair (8-year-old grandson riding pillion) months before he died

Arguably, Winterbottom's greatest achievement was securing a multilateral agreement following protracted negotiations with all the big producers of bookcloth in both the UK, the US and Germany, leading to the formation of the Winterbottom Book Cloth Company in 1891, which dominated the global market during the late 19th Century and through the first half of the 20th century. The relentless business magnate who personified his business ventures, existed simultaneously with the more pastoral gentleman farmer, who projected "a quiet interest in the County". Winterbottom's contribution to expanding the manufacture and distribution of books around the world were concealed partly by his highly secretive approach, and partly because the formative role played by bookcloth in popularising edition publishing is not widely known outside of the industry.

Hundreds of mourners attended Winterbottom's funeral, spilling out into the churchyard in groups, and lining the road between Horton Hall and the churchyard of St. Mary's church, where he is interred with his first wife Minnie.
