= Horton Hall =

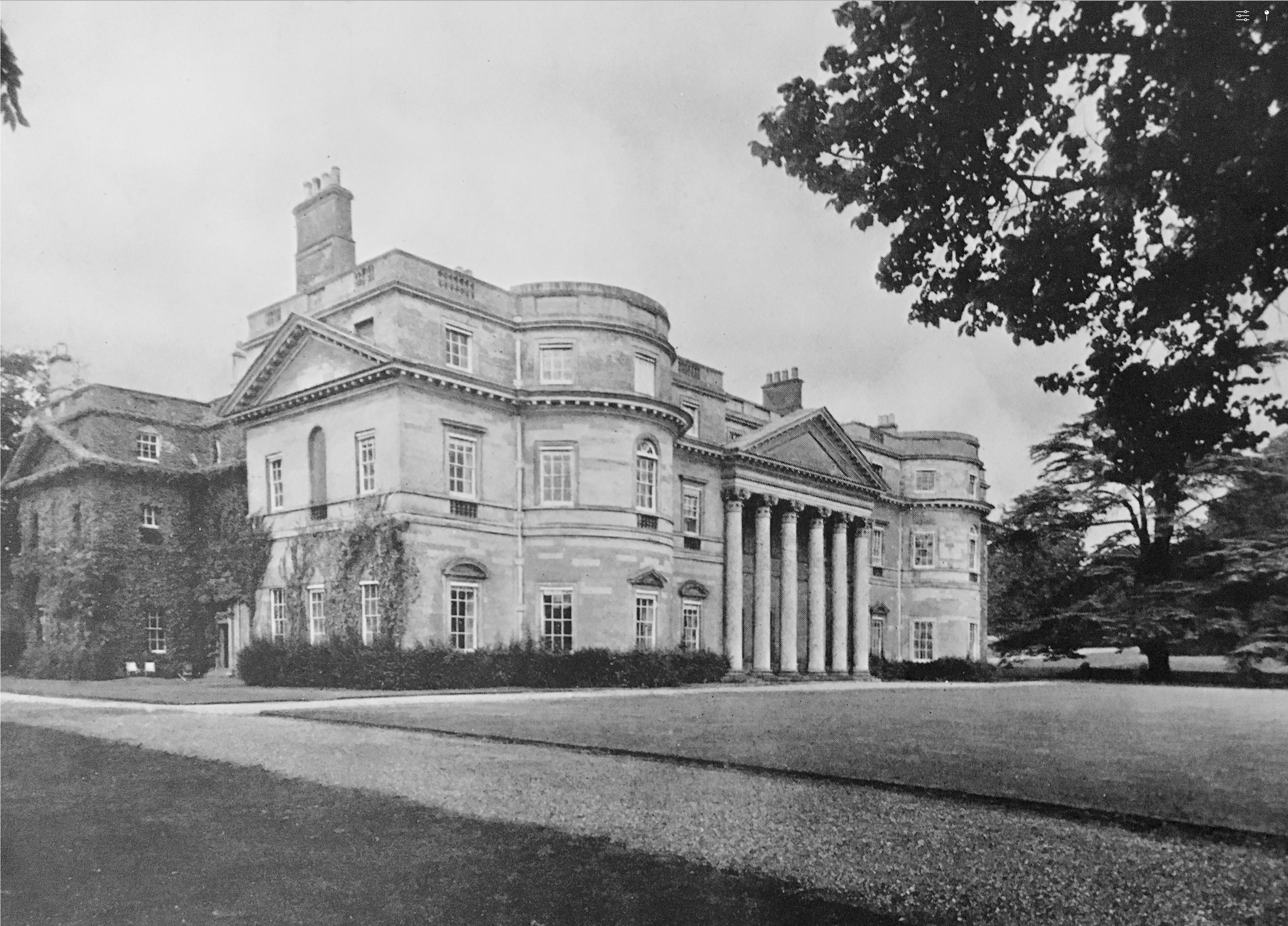
- Horton Hall - photograph taken from the SE corner, 1935
- Interactive map of Horton Hall
- 52.179939°N 0.7992363°W
- Type: House
- Location: Horton, Northamptonshire, England

History
- Built: 1740 with earlier origins

Horton Hall, known locally as Horton House, was a stone-built Georgian stately home, now demolished, located on a 3,764 acre estate stretching across nine parishes on the Northamptonshire and Buckinghamshire borders.

== History ==
The earliest entry for Horton can be found in the Domesday Book from 1086, when Odbert held 2 hides "in Hortone". The land passed down to his son Alouf de Merke in the following century, but it is not until the early 14th century that Ralph de Botyler is certified as Lord of the manor of Horton, implying the existence of a messuage of some significance. The manor passed to John Mortimer of Grendon who passed it on to Roger Salisbury, commemorated in 1492 by a brass plaque in St. Mary's Church at Horton. Roger's granddaughter Mary married William Parr, uncle to Henry VIII's sixth and last queen, Katherine Parr. Having become Lord of the manor, William was created Baron Parr of Horton in 1543 and is memorialised with his wife Mary in a fine alabaster altar tomb in Horton Church. William had made Maud Parr his eldest daughter aged eight his heir in 1517. She was promised to the ten year old Ralph Lane and William saw over them, and their later marriage, until Ralph's twentieth birthday.

Ownership passed to the first Earl of Manchester Henry Montagu in the early 17th Century. Over the next 160 years, six generations of the Montagu family added to the house and extended the grounds. An estate map of 1622 reveals a sizeable Tudor mansion built around two courtyards and an octagonal tower in its southeastern corner, the birth place of Charles Montagu, 1st Earl of Halifax, who later established the Bank of England. By 1721, the Montagus had set about developing the house and estate, surrounding the house with formal gardens in keeping with their growing influence both locally and in Parliament. The last Montagu to live at Horton, George Montagu-Dunk, 2nd Earl of Halifax, extended the house even further commencing around 1742, eventually completely replacing the original medieval edifice with a grand Palladian mansion designed by Daniel Garrett, completed by Thomas Wright after 1753, when Garrett died. Contemporary drawings reveal a central dome and two bows topped by domes, the latter observed by Horace Walpole when he visited in 1763.

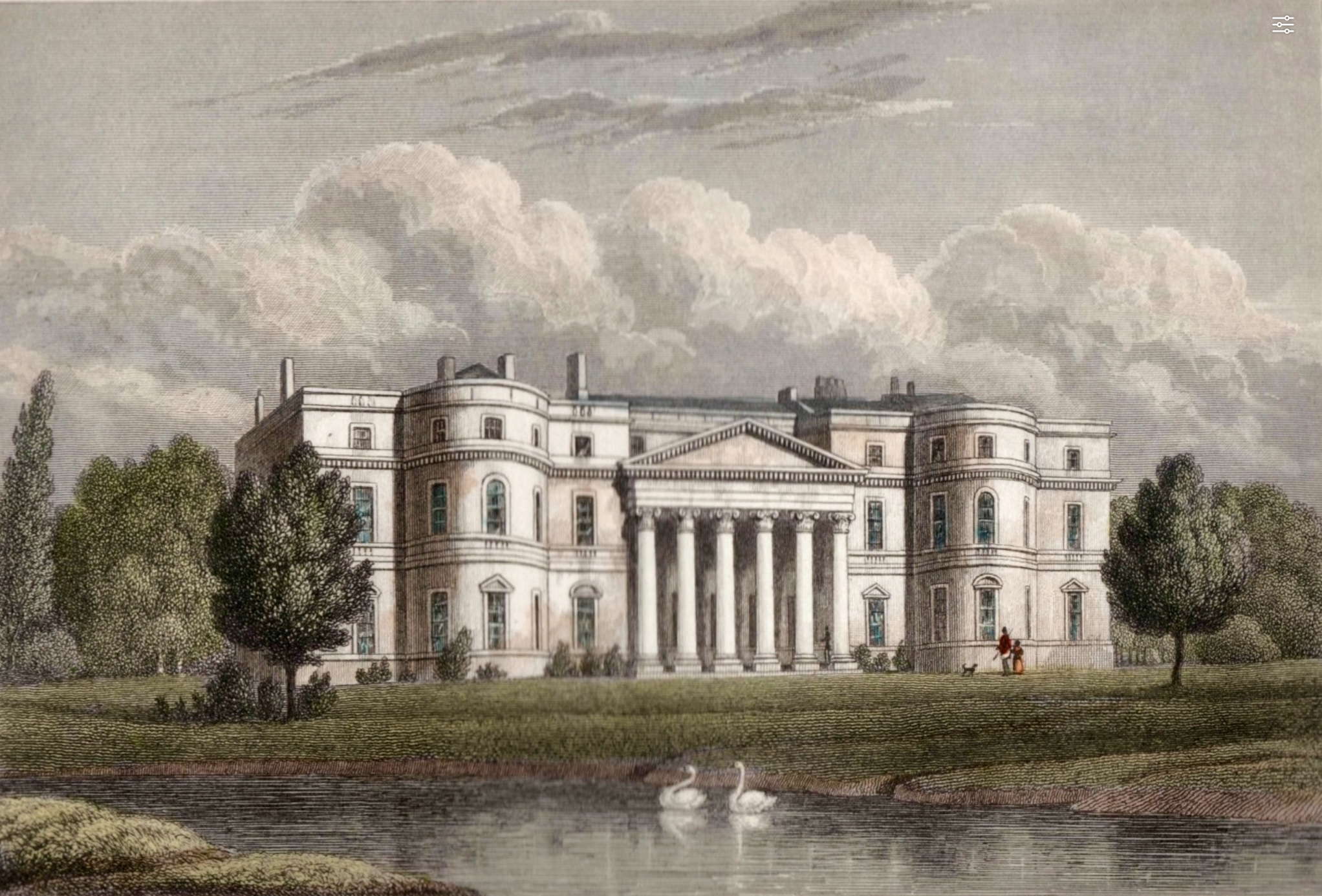
Horton House, circa 1824

By 1781, the Montagus had run out of male heirs, and the entire estate was sold to Sir Robert Gunning. Horton House was described in 1791 as a spacious mansion of great beauty set in an extensive park with a pavilion at both ends of the park with follies, a menagerie, temples, serpentine lakes as well as out-buildings. By the time that James Storer presented his engraving of the house in 1812, the house looked much as it did in 1935 but with the domes missing, presumed demolished. Four generations of the Gunning family lived at Horton Hall until 1888 when it was sold for its investment potential to Pickering Phipps II, a Northampton brewer. Phipps leased the house as a boarding school until 1899, when the lease expired. Horton Hall had been neglected but was purchased the same year by George Harold Winterbottom, a wealthy industrialist, together with the greater estate including land and properties in the villages and parishes of Horton, Hackleton, Piddington, Quinton, Preston Deanery, Stoke Goldington, Ravenstone, Roade and Hanslope. Winterbottom set about extending the house, adding a new front and entrance hall to the north side, squaring the building off and completely refurbishing the interior, commissioning a series of large murals on canvas by Sir Frank Brangwyn. Winterbottom breathed new life in to the estate by building a new village hall at Hackleton and donating a cricket ground and pavilion for the newly formed Horton House Cricket Club, which thrive today.

== "Gone but not Forgotten" ==
Winterbottom died in 1934, leaving his considerable fortune and estate to be divided amongst his widow and six children. Horton Hall had been refurbished, modernised, augmented with pleasure gardens and a swimming pool, and was just too large for private buyers in the midst of The Depression. The House and gardens were sold to a developer and were demolished in 1936 to make way for new housing. Of the original 18th- and 19th century buildings associated with the main house, four are grade II listed and remain in use today. These include dual lodges, The Menagerie, fully restored by Gervase Jackson-Stops, The New Temple, "as fine as any at Stowe or Stourhead", which was converted so that the portico forms the centre of a substantial property and was renamed Temple House, and finally the brick stable block and coach house, which was restored, converted and renamed Captain's Court. The beautiful interiors, fireplaces, marbles, panelled rooms, main staircase, "stone and door knob" were all auctioned, with some of the murals now held by the Dunedin Public Art Gallery, and the Museum of New Zealand Te Papa Tongarewa both in New Zealand.

Horton Hall was an historic building whose owners, as certified Lords of the Manor, had a duty of care to a large community of villages and tenants that was neither sustainable nor appropriate as a social model in the 20th century. Those same owners were often historic world figures, six of whom were appointed High Sheriffs to a grateful County, from Roger Salisbury in 1467 to George Winterbottom in 1906. What remains of the original house are valuable fragments of the social history of England, some scattered across the globe.
