= Minnie Byron =

Victorian English mezzo soprano and actress (1861–1901)

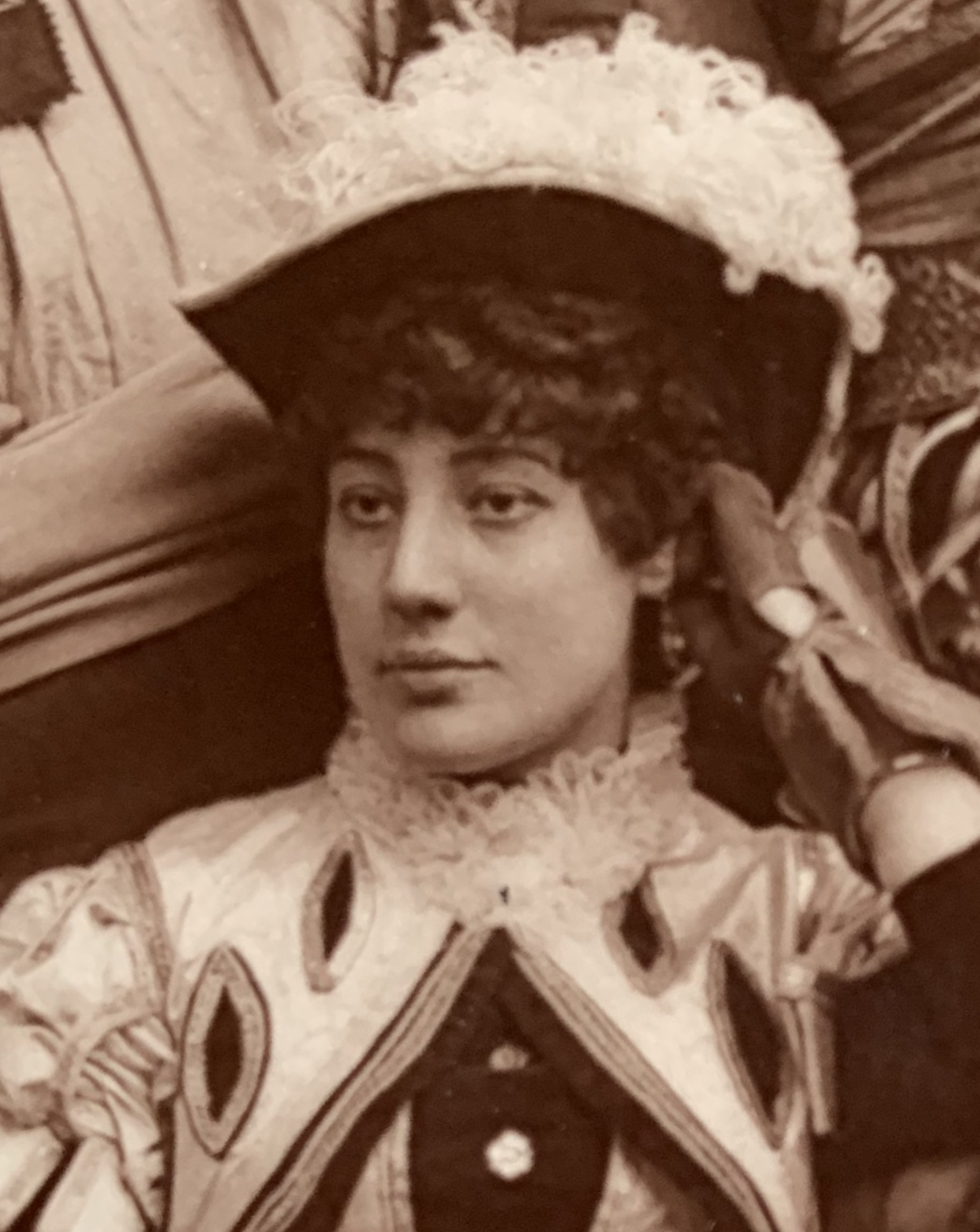
Photo portrait of Minnie Byron in the role of the Princess Fiametta in La mascotte, 1881

Louisa Elizabeth Babb (1861–1901), known professionally as Minnie Byron, was an English mezzo-soprano and actress best known for her character performances of Opéra bouffe in the 1880s. However successful, Byron was not a career performer, using her brief public visibility to secure a more stable and prosperous future for herself and her children, an important footnote in social history or specifically, women's history.

== Biography ==
Byron was born in Woolwich in 1861 to Louisa Frances (née Young) and Henry Babb, a shipwright from Devon. (Note: One of her parents was said to have been “a famous dramatist” but their professional name is unknown.) It is unknown where or how she had acquired her education, (Note: At the age of 9, she was boarding with her mother's younger sister in Gillingham, Kent who was a housekeeper.) vocal training or acting skills, but at the age of nineteen, Byron made her West End debut at the Globe Theatre (Newcastle Street) in the chorus of Les Mousquetaires in 1880. For the next 5 months, she honed her skills playing minor opéra bouffe roles at The Globe opposite Henry Bracy (Note: Byron worked with Henry Bracy for the next two years) with no billing, appearing in La Belle Normande in January 1881.

Byron was encouraged to take on more prominent roles at the Globe as understudy to Alice May as Simone and Madame Amadé as Triste, which got her noticed. Contemporary reviews reported that she looked good on stage and acquitted herself well in singing and acting. Byron was quickly talent-spotted by Charles Wyndham and Richard D'Oyly Carte who selected her to tour with H.B. Farnie’s hit production of Olivette. (Note: “...Miss Minnie Byron, a young actress whose vocal powers and attractive style secured the warmest tokens of admiration, Miss Byron has high operatic capabilities, besides possessing to the full the finest spirit of comedy opera.”) She returned with the production to the Strand Theatre in August 1881, before starting rehearsals in a new English adaptation of Edmond Audran's opéra comique, La mascotte by Robert Reece and H. B. Farnie.

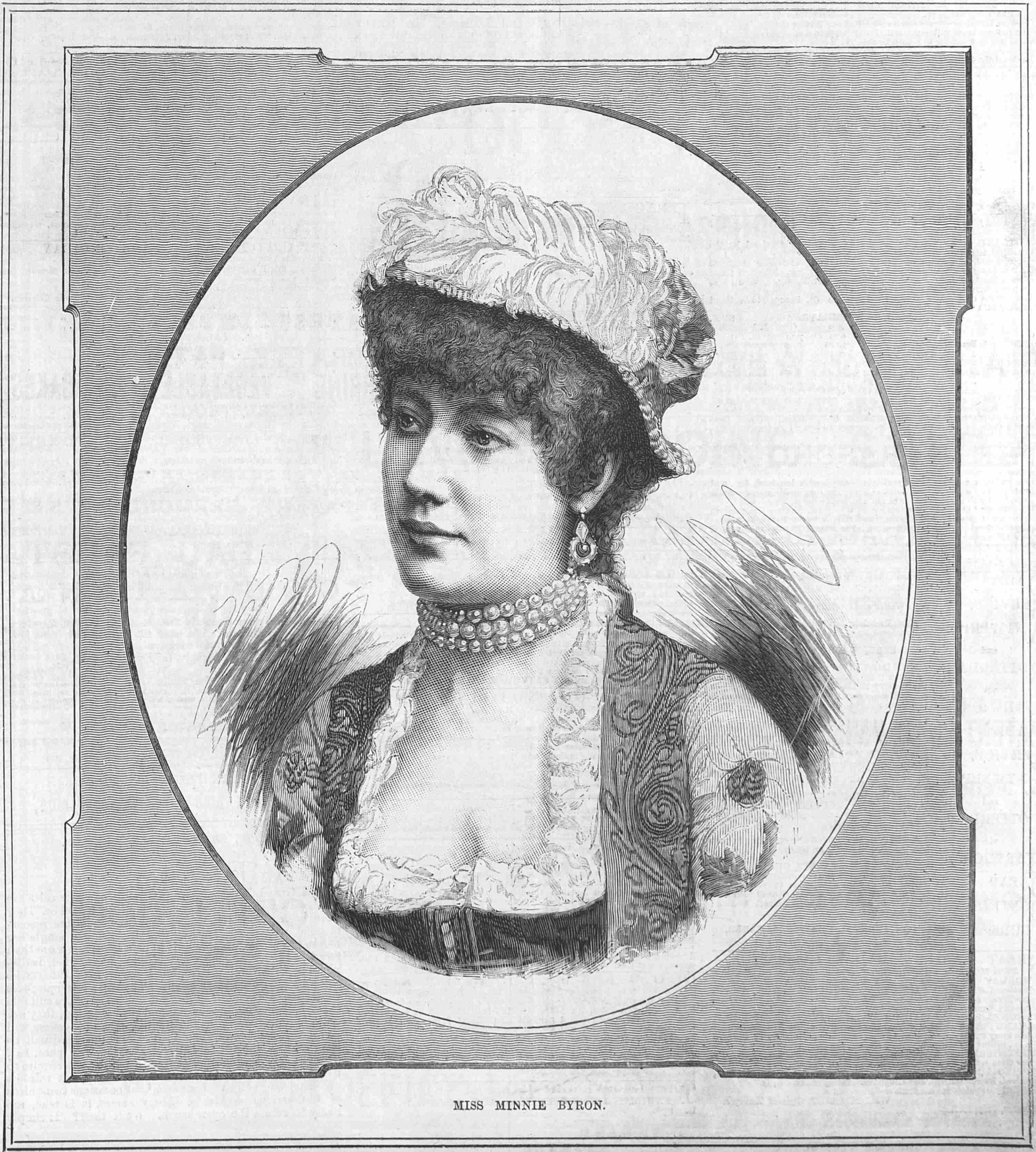
Minnie Byron in 1882.

Byron premiered as the Princess Fiametta in La Mascotte at Brighton in September 1881, previewing the grand West End opening night on October 15th, which was also the opening of the new Comedy Theatre. The production was a hit with audiences, which she took on tour in 1882 with Miss Kate Santley's company.

Byron left Santley's company in May 1882, taking up a residency at the newly opened Royal Avenue Theatre playing Isabel in Les Manteaux Noirs opposite her old friend and mentor, Henry Bracy in a star-studded cast, which included Charles Groves, Florence St. John and Louie Henri. The residency allowed her to explore other genres, playing musical comedietta, one-act musical sketches such as Simpson and Delilah, and Wedded Bliss. In 1883, Byron once again played Bathilde in a revival of Olivette, which didn't come easily initially with mixed reviews. Her contract with the Avenue came to an abrupt end in May 1883, when it was announced "Miss Minnie Byron, of the Avenue, has married Mr. Ferguson from China, and now dwells at a fine old manor house in Sussex." (Note: Byron had evidently quit the London stage for a more genteel life in the country as the wife of a respectable older man, the lady of Foxhunt Hall in Waldron, East Sussex.)

=== Mrs Adolphus Ferguson ===
Life in the "manor house" was short lived, as it emerged that Adolphus Ferguson was experiencing financial difficulties, and in February 1884, he was declared bankrupt. Byron remained with her husband through his difficulties, giving birth to their daughter Ruby in early 1884, and their son Alexander late in 1885. (Note: Apart from a brief appearance as a serio-comic at her local theatre in 1883, Byron had had no work on stage.) In October 1885, a few weeks after Alexander was born, Byron's agent declared her intention to return to the stage following a break of two and a half years. Within a week she was performing in Glasgow, where she remained for the duration of the pantomime season. (Note: It is possible that Byron was forced back into work to support her family and may have left her children with her husband at home) Byron played the principal boy (Ganem) in The Forty Thieves and was soon scooping up bouquets of flowers, once again, thrown at her feet on stage.

In January 1886, still in Glasgow, Byron performed duets with Emily Soldene, but by April, she had returned to London preparing for a new opéra bouffe, creating the role of Jacquette in the Lily of Leoville opposite Henry Bracy and Violet Melnotte. The show, though a qualified success playing to full houses, was never planned to run for long, closing in June after 41 performances. In the meantime, Byron had got back with her friends in London, while her husband left for Canada to seek his fortune, never to return.

At the end of the summer of 1886, Byron was offered the part of Zoe in Commodore and Sir Walter Raleigh in Kenilworth to tour in America alongside her friend Violet Cameron. (Note: Cameron was caught up in a very public affaire with Lonsdale and wanted Byron as her companion for the tour. Unfortunately for Lonsdale, Cameron's cuckolded husband, David de Bensaude, followed the troupe out to America, ensuring that the affaire played out on the streets of New York. The American public were much more interested in the unfolding drama off stage than the performances on stage.) The producer, Lonsdale, agreed but without explanation, changed his mind just before they were due to depart. Assured of work on tour in America, Byron missed out on the summer season, appearing in a comedy London Assurance at Crystal Palace in the autumn until the pantomime season, where she appeared as the principal boy (Robin Hood) in Babes in the Wood in Liverpool. The season ended in January 1887, when Byron began an affaire with a man the same age as her and who was rich.

=== Mrs Harold Winterbottom ===
1887 began with pantomime for Byron but ended in a new genre for her, headlining in Variety as a performer of Burlesque and as a serio-comic. 1887 also represented a deepening in her relationship with George Harold Winterbottom, an ambitious young businessman from Manchester who increasingly travelled to London from Manchester, building partnerships and expanding his growing business empire. Byron and Winterbottom were living together at her flat in Kensington and had their first son, George, early in 1889. (Note: Byron had sufficient funds to host an extravagant party on a pleasure boat at the Henley Regatta for old stage friends such as Violet Cameron and Lionel Brough.) By the end of the year, she was able to return to the stage with her old company at The Avenue, playing the part of Earl Darnley in Robert Brough's revival of the burlesque The Field of the Cloth of Gold, which ran until February 1890.

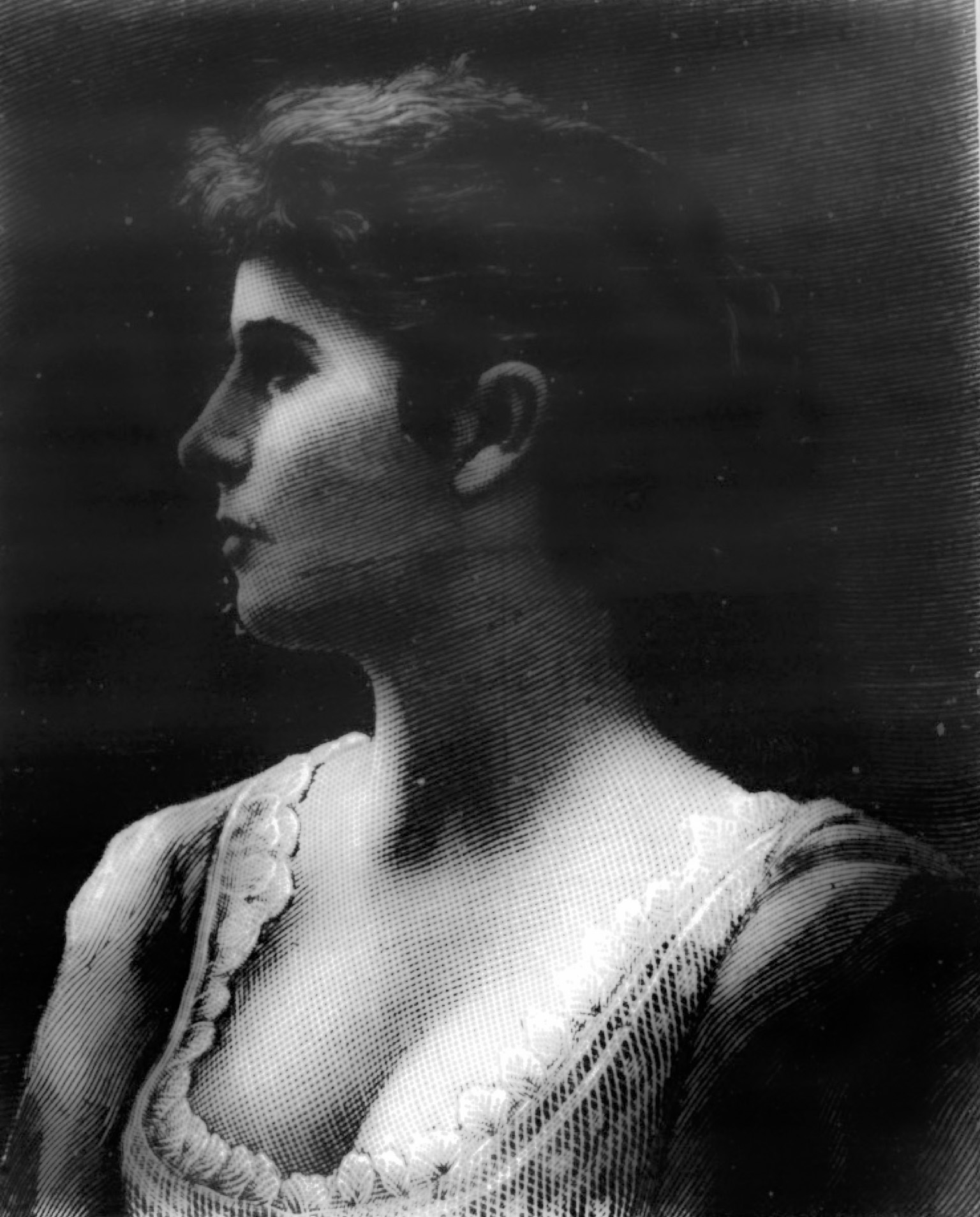
Minnie Byron, engraving from a portrait circa 1891

Byron had her second son with Winterbottom, Oscar, early in 1891. (Note: Byron was pregnant again; the problem for Winterbottom was that she was still married to Adolphus Ferguson. Towards the end of 1890, Byron moved into Winterbottom's house in Kensington, while Winterbottom travelled to North America, where he remained for up to four months, much longer than was needed to conclude his business alone. The following month, a decree nisi was granted by a Canadian court, to "free" Ferguson from his marriage to Byron, citing Winterbottom as the "correspondent" in the divorce proceedings.) They got married as soon as Byron's divorce came through, having a third son, Dudley, in 1892. Byron and Winterbottom enjoyed the next ten years together travelling on extended holidays to Europe and especially to the US, where she was presented as "Minnie Byron, the clever and talented English actress, of charming features, handsome figure, winning ways and a host of admirers". In reality, Byron's professional days in the theatre had ceased a few years earlier in 1890 concluding a decade on stage, although she did make rare recital or guest appearances as Mrs Harold Winterbottom. By 1898, the couple had found their future home, Horton Hall, which Winterbottom purchased and together, set about adding a new wing, and completely re-furbished the interior. (Note: It is likely that Minnie had been involved in every part of the project to purchase and refurbish the house) Minnie gave birth to a daughter, Betty, in London on March 18, 1901, but died of puerperal fever 10 days later.

== Legacy ==
Byron's stage career was much briefer (a decade) than many of her contemporaries like Violet Cameron who were career performers. She used her profession to win respectability (and prosperity) through marriage and like so many women in the 19th century, she died as a consequence of giving birth.

Minnie Byron's stage appearances 1880 - 1890
Show	Part	Venue	Date (Note: date that Byron first appeared in the production)	Perfor-mances (Note: Minimum number of performances by Byron in the production)
Les mousquetaires	Chorus (u/s Simone)	Globe Theatre (Newcastle Street)	30 Oct 1880	56
La Belle Normande	Chorus (u/s Triste)	Globe Theatre (Newcastle St.)	21 Jan 1881	42
Olivette	Bathilde	On tour	08 Mar 1881	63
Olivette	Bathilde	Royal Strand Theatre	31 Aug 1881	4
La mascotte	Fiametta	The Comedy Theatre	20 Sep 1881	42
La mascotte	Fiametta	On tour	30 Jan 1882	??
Les Manteaux Noirs	Isabelle	Avenue Theatre	03 Jun 1882	43
Simpson and Delilah	Delilah	Avenue Theatre	03 Jun 1882	40+
Wedded Bliss	Louise	Avenue Theatre	06 Oct 1882	43
Les Manteaux Noirs	Isabelle	Avenue Theatre	25 Nov 1882	29
Olivette	Bathilde	Avenue Theatre	13 Jan 1883	62
Music hall	Serio-comic	Alexandra Theatre, Hanley	08 Sep 1883	4+
The Forty Thieves	Ganem (principal boy)	The Grand Theatre, Glasgow	12 Dec 1885	62
Duet from Geneviève de Brabant	Genevieve	Theatre-Royal, Glasgow	14 Jan 1886	1+?
Lily of Léoville	Jacquette	The Comedy Theater	10 May 1886	63
The Commodore	Zoe	Theatre Royal, Nottingham	28 Aug 1886	1
London Assurance		The Crystal Palace	02 Oct 1886	??
Babes in the Wood	Robin Hood (principal boy)	Prince of Wales, Liverpool	12 Oct 1886	76
Field of the Cloth of Gold	Darnley	Avenue Theatre	01 Dec 1889	42

The stage gave Byron the visibility to be remembered despite the brevity of her life, providing a testimonial to social history. One of her grand children, Gerald Case, did follow her in becoming an actor. Byron is buried alongside her second husband at Horton, Northamptonshire.
