= NPSA =

NPSA may refer to:

- National Park of American Samoa
- National Pedal Sport Association, south-eastern US regional BMX sanctioning body 1974–1988
- National Patient Safety Agency, part of the National Health Service of the United Kingdom
- National Public Schools Association, group taking part in the National education campaign in the United Kingdom (1837–1870)
- National Party South Africa
- National Protective Security Authority
- Northeastern Political Science Association
