= Vivian Pickles =

English actress (born 1931)

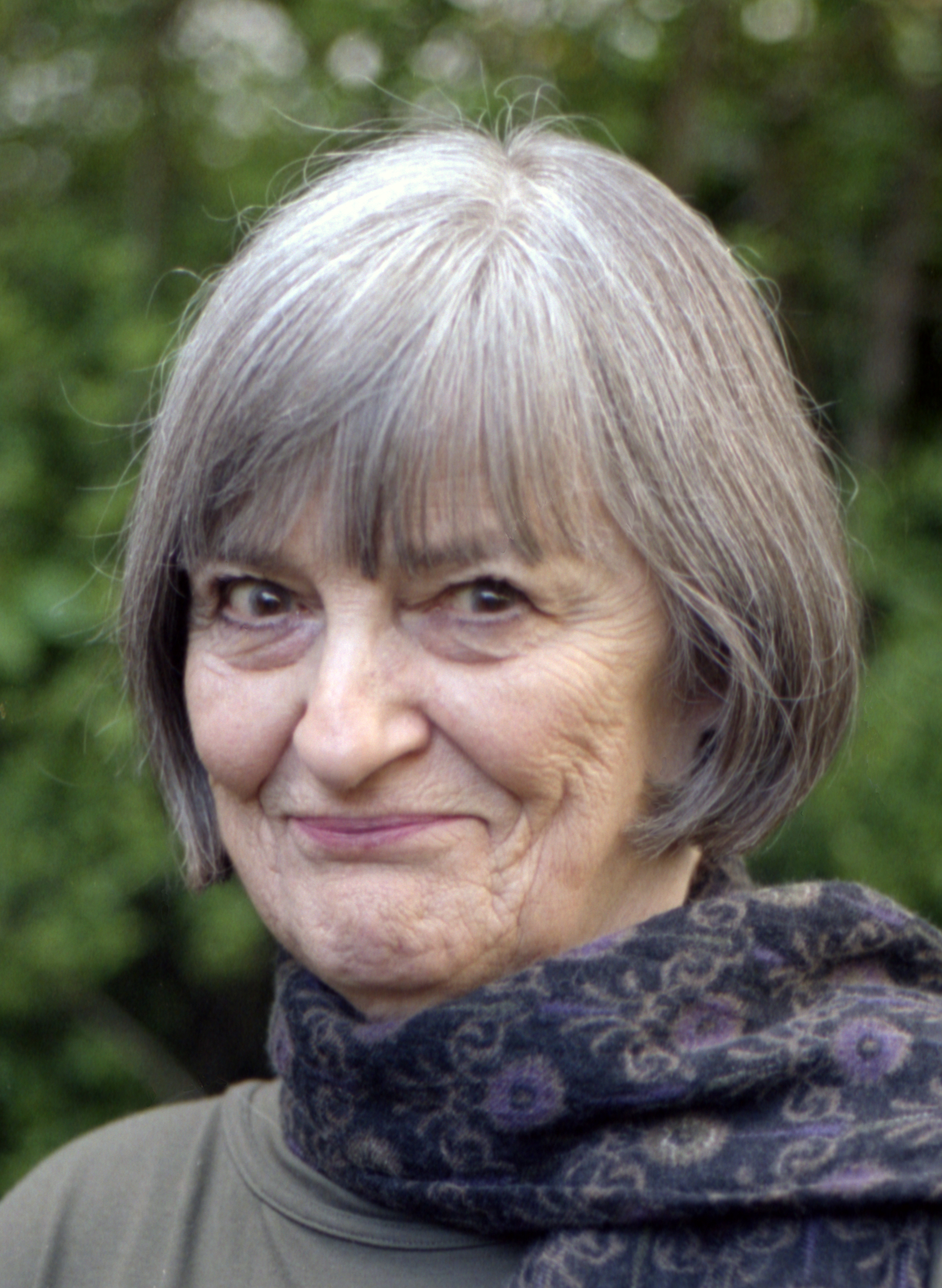
- Vivian Pickles in London (2008)
- Born: 21 October 1931 (age 94); London, England
- Occupation: Actress
- Years active: 1944–present
- Spouse: Gordon Gostelow (m. 1964; died 2007)
- Children: 1

Vivian Pickles (born 21 October 1931) is an English actress.

== Biography ==
Pickles began her career as a child star after being chosen by Mary Field for a series of Saturday morning children's films, including the lead roles in the serial The Adventures of Peter Joe (1945) and Jean's Plan (1946).

At the age of 14, she played Alice in George More O'Ferrall's BBC production of Alice in Wonderland which was broadcast live from Alexandra Palace in London. During this period, she acted at the Q Theatre in Vice Versa with Charles Hawtrey and made her West End debut as Wee Willie Winkie in Land of the Xmas Stocking at the Duke of York's Theatre, with Richard Goolden.

After being educated at Le Collège Feminin de Bouffémont in Paris, she started her adult performing career acting in repertory and progressed to featured roles in West End revues. In 1952, she appeared with Roger Moore in I Capture the Castle at the Aldwych Theatre. The production won Roger Moore an MGM contract. When Moore left for Hollywood, Bill Travers assumed Moore's role.

In 1959, she worked with her future husband, Gordon Gostelow in Glimpse of the Sea by Willis Hall at the Lyric Theatre, Hammersmith. In February 1961, she appeared with Henry Kendall in the first performance of Pool's Paradise at the Phoenix Theatre. Pickles' imperious performance in the world première of John Osborne's Plays for England at the Royal Court Theatre (on 19 July 1962) received praise from Osborne in his autobiography, Looking Back. The following year, Pickles appeared with Peter O'Toole in London in Berthold Brecht's Baal at the Phoenix Theatre (in April 1963).

Hired by Ken Russell for a supporting role for his BBC film, Diary of a Nobody (1964), she graduated to the lead role in Russell's film about Isadora Duncan, Isadora Duncan, the Biggest Dancer in the World (1966) – receiving several awards for her performance, including Best Actress at the Monte Carlo International Festival. In 1967, she appeared in Giles Cooper's BBC adaptation of Evelyn Waugh's Sword of Honour trilogy and also in Pride and Prejudice as Mrs. Bennet.

Her appearance in Isadora Duncan, the Biggest Dancer in the World helped Pickles win the role of Mrs. Chasen in Hal Ashby's Harold and Maude (1971), playing Harold's weary mother. It is the only American-based film she has made. In the booklet accompanying the soundtrack album of the film, Ashby was quoted,

"Vivian Pickles is one of the finest actresses in the world. I'd seen the thing that she did for Ken Russell – 'Isadora'".

Another memorable performance on British television was as Mary I, in Elizabeth R (1971) with Glenda Jackson in the lead role. Around the same time she also worked with Jackson in John Schlesinger's film, Sunday Bloody Sunday (1971), in which she played the bohemian mother who employed Jackson as a babysitter. Other screen roles include Play Dirty (1969, with Michael Caine), The Looking Glass War (1970), Hello-Goodbye (1970), Nicholas and Alexandra (1971), Candleshoe (1977), and two films for Lindsay Anderson – O Lucky Man! (1973), in which she plays the good lady feeding the downtrodden in London, and the pivotal role of the Matron in Britannia Hospital (1982). She also played Lady Montdore in the original Thames Television dramatisation of two books by Nancy Mitford, Love in a Cold Climate (1980).

Her later television films include Miss Morrison's Ghosts (1981) with Wendy Hiller and Alan Bennett's The Insurance Man (1986), with Daniel Day-Lewis and Jim Broadbent. On the stage, she worked in a work by Alan Bennett in the première production of Kafka's Dick at the Royal Court Theatre. She has also worked in productions for radio.

From 1990 to 1992, she appeared as Aunt Sylvie in Birds of a Feather.

In 1999, she was a guest star in the Midsomer Murders episode "Death's Shadow".

In 2014, she collaborated with writer Paul Sutton on the book Six English Filmmakers (ISBN 978-0957246256), in which she talks about her work, particularly for Ken Russell's Isadora Duncan film.

== Filmography ==
Year	Title	Role	Notes
1946	Jean's Plan	Jean Fairfax	
1966	Isadora Duncan, the Biggest Dancer in the World	Isadora Duncan	
1969	Play Dirty	German Nurse	
1970	The Looking Glass War	Mrs. King	
1970	Hello-Goodbye	Joycie	
1971	Sunday Bloody Sunday	Alva Hodson	
1971	Nicholas and Alexandra	Mme. Krupskaya	
1971	Harold and Maude	Mrs. Chasen	
1973	O Lucky Man!	Good lady	
1977	Candleshoe	Clara Grimsworthy	
1982	Britannia Hospital	Matron	
