= Preston Deanery =

Village in Northamptonshire, England

Coordinates: 52.1937°N 0.8474°W

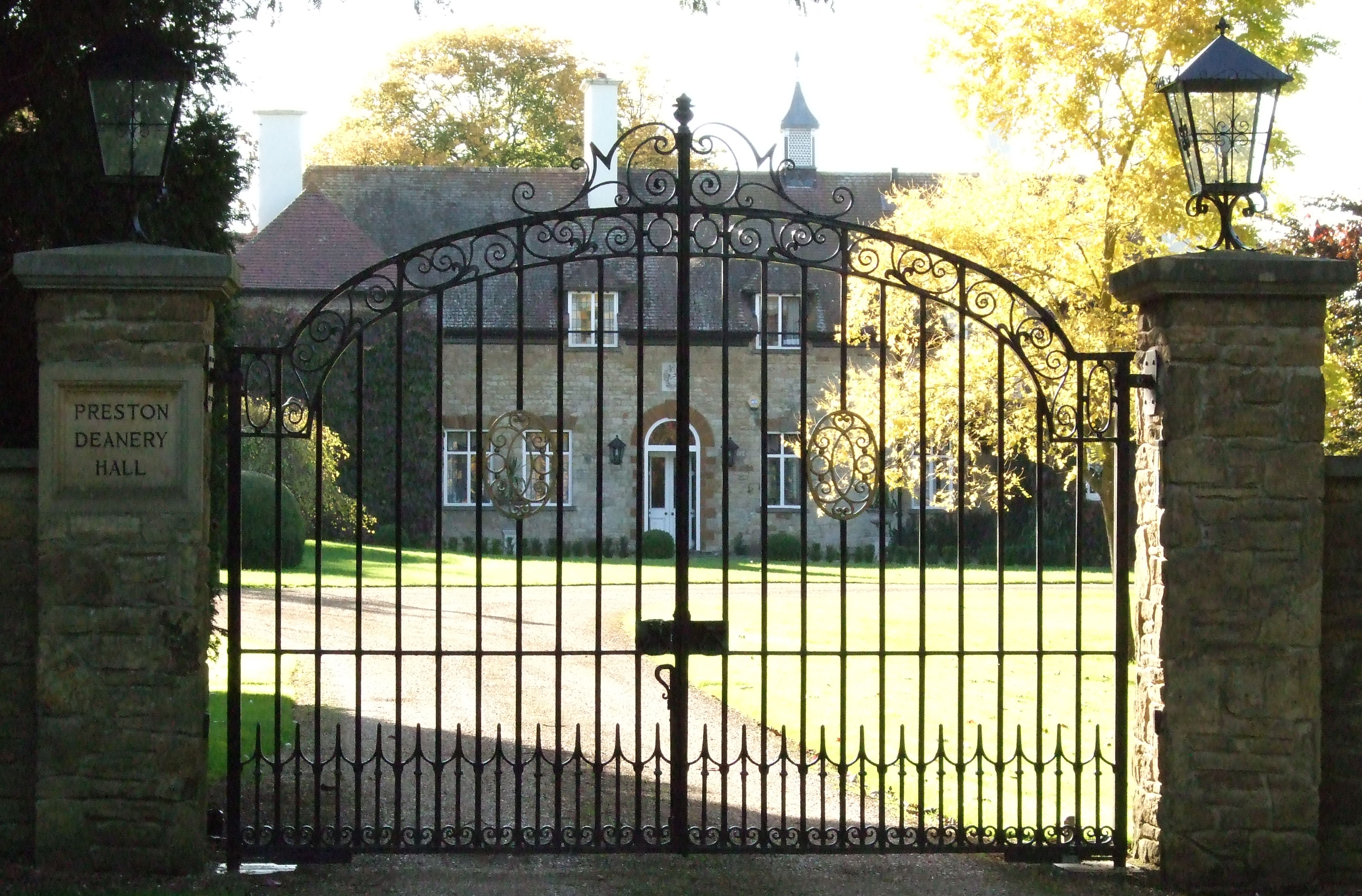
- Preston Deanery Hall

- Location within Northamptonshire
- Population: 51 (2010 est)
- OS grid reference: SP788556
- Civil parish: Hackleton
- Unitary authority: West Northamptonshire
- Ceremonial county: Northamptonshire
- Region: East Midlands
- Country: England
- Sovereign state: United Kingdom
- Post town: Northampton
- Postcode district: NN7
- Dialling code: 01604
- Police: Northamptonshire
- Fire: Northamptonshire
- Ambulance: East Midlands
- UK Parliament: Northampton South

Preston Deanery is a village and former civil parish, now in the parish of Hackleton, in West Northamptonshire, England. It is 4 miles (6 km) south of Northampton town centre and 1.5 miles (2 km) by road to the M1 London to Yorkshire motorway junction 15. It lies just off the B526 road (former A50) from Northampton to Newport Pagnell, between Hackleton and Wootton, a former village which has become now a suburb of Northampton. The 2010 population estimate was 51.

The village's name means 'Priests' farm/settlement'. The hamlet gave its name to the deanery here.

== Governance ==
The village is represented on Hackleton parish council which also covers the nearby villages of Piddington and Horton. It is an "ancient parish"; a village or group of villages or hamlets and the adjacent lands which originally they held ecclesiastical functions, but from the 16th century onwards they also acquired civil roles. In 1931 the parish of Preston Deanery had a population of 103. On 1 April 1935 the parish was abolished and merged with Hackleton.

== Buildings ==
=== Church ===
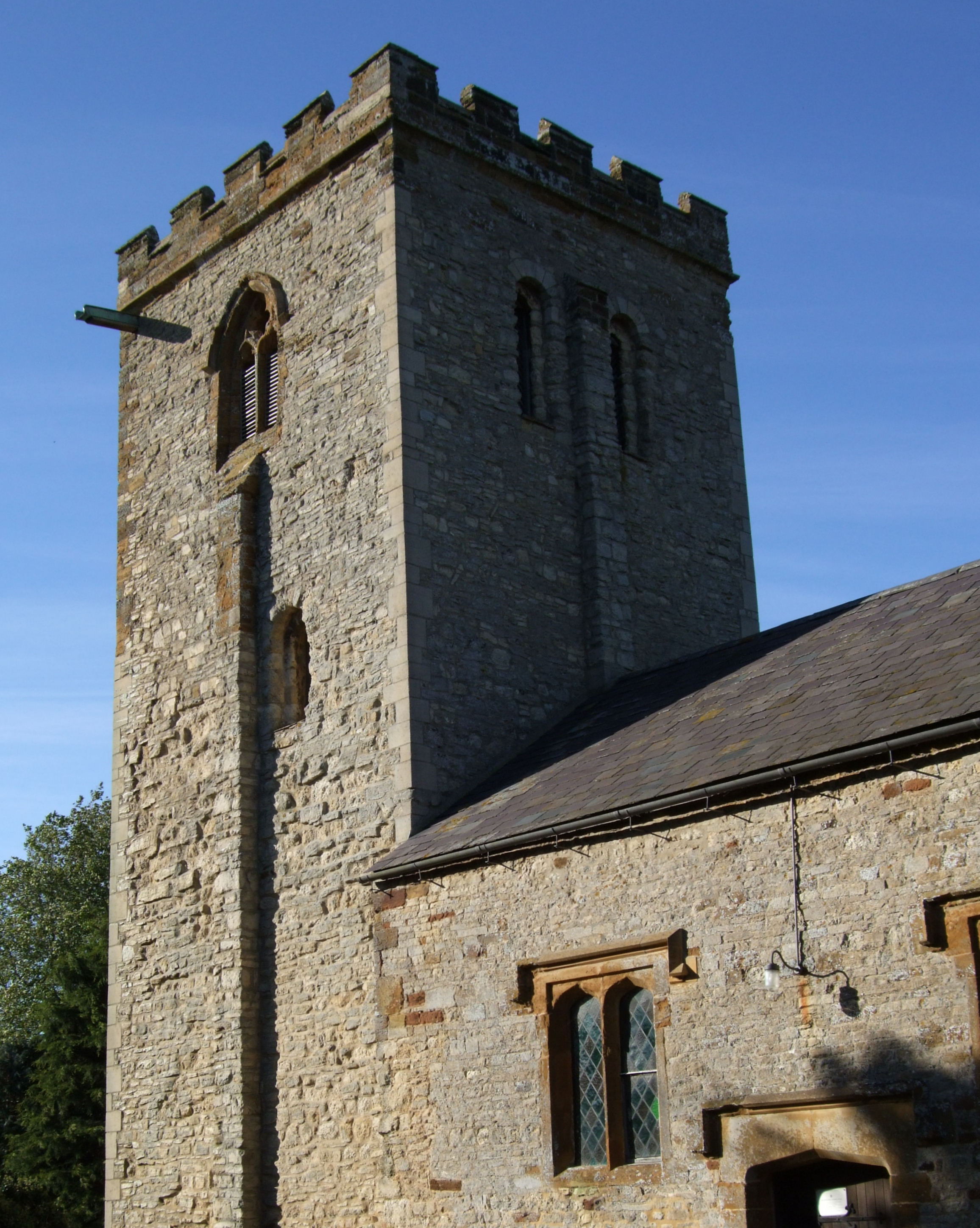
Preston Deanery Church of Saints Peter and Paul

The church was dedicated to St Peter circa 1200, then St Peter and St Paul c.1415. It was a parish church for what was at the time a much larger and later abandoned village. The church is now redundant but cared for by the Churches Conservation Trust. It has a 12th-century west tower with a central pilaster-buttress on each face, a single nave, and a square-ended chancel. A small part of the church is early Norman (11th century) and an even earlier part appears to have an early Viking influence, which is very unusual for the area. The chancel arch is Romanesque.

=== Preston Deanery Hall and other houses ===
Around 1940 Preston Deanery consisted of four semi-detached properties, half a dozen farms and Preston Deanery Hall, once inhabited by monks but since converted to a private residence. During the Second World War one of the houses was occupied by a boy and his mother, who worked as a domestic servant at the Hall. The boy went to school in Hackleton. His experiences are described on the BBC People's War website.

=== Preston Green ===
Further urban expansion of Northampton was being planned in October 2008 with another 13,500 houses and additional infrastructure in the rural areas around Grange Park, Quinton and Preston Deanery however the incoming Conservative-LibDem coalition government of the 2010 General Election has abolished this expansion proposal.
