= Museum Mystery =

- Elizabeth Inglis and Gerald Case (left) in the film
- Directed by: Clifford Gulliver
- Written by: Gerald Elliott
- Produced by: Anthony Havelock-Allan
- Starring: Jock McKay; Elizabeth Inglis; Gerald Case
- Cinematography: Francis Carver
- Production company: British & Dominions Film Corporation
- Distributed by: Paramount British Pictures (UK)
- Release date: April 1937 (UK)
- Running time: 69 minutes
- Country: United Kingdom
- Language: English

Museum Mystery (also known as Museum Peace) is a 1937 British crime film directed by Clifford Gulliver and starring Jock McKay, Elizabeth Inglis and Gerald Case. It was written by Gerald Elliot, and was made as a quota quickie.

== Preservation status ==
The British Film Institute National Archive holds a collection of stills but no film or video materials.

== Plot ==
The curator of a museum is taken ill on the morning of the exhibition of a valuable Chinese statue, and Peter Redding, a visiting student of Oriental art, is invited to act as stand-in for the curator. Ruth, the curator's daughter, at first resents Peter's intrusion, but they later foil the owner's plot to have the piece stolem and fraudulently claim the insurance money.

== Cast ==
- Jock McKay as Jock
- Elizabeth Inglis as Ruth Carter
- Gerald Case as Peter Redding
- Tony Wylde as Mr. Varleigh
- Charles Paton as Clutters
- Alfred Wellesley as Mayor
- Sebastian Smith as Dr. Trapnell
- Roy Byford as Professor Wickstead

== Reception ==
Kine Weekly wrote: Museum Piece, not Museum Mystery, should have been the title of this British crime drama, for nothing so dated has been seen for many a day. It is a pathetic parade of faults culminating in the laughter of derision. ... Jock McKay, the Scottish comedian, and Charles Paton are not too bad as museum attendants, but Gerald Case and Elizabeth Inglis are very weak as the lovers. ...The combination of crime, comedy and romance exhibited here is so crude and amateurish that the picture will not stand an earthly anywhere."

The Daily Film Renter wrote: "Presented with overplus of dialogue; artificial situations, and occasionally unintentional comedy, subject is poorly acted, and directed with almost complete lack of imagination. ... Apart from a reasonably realistic reproduction of a provincial museum, this film has little to recommend it to the patron in search of entertainment. ... The climax, with crook and police face to face, is so badly done that it created laughter at the preview. Direction is undistinguished."

Picture Show wrote: "Unconvincing, confusing drama, dealing with the adventures brought about by an Oriental idol. Direction is weak, dialogue stiff, fair acting."
