= Jean's Plan =

1946 film

- Directed by: A.C. Hammond
- Based on: Story by J.O. Thomas
- Produced by: F.A. Hoare
- Starring: Vivian Pickles; Billie Brook; Tony Hillman
- Cinematography: Bob Walker
- Production companies: Merton Park Studios; Children's Entertainment Films; Gaumont-British Instructional
- Release date: 1946
- Running time: 34 minutes
- Country: United Kingdom
- Language: English

Jean's Plan is a 1946 British children's short crime film directed by A.C. Hammond and starring Billie Brooks, Gerald Case and Lyn Evans. It was based on a story by J.O. Thomas.

== Plot summary ==
The daughter of a jeweller attempts to stop her father being robbed.

== Cast ==
- Billie Brooks as Elsie Higgs
- Gerald Case as Inspector of Police
- Lyn Evans as Mr. Higgs
- Stanley Martin as police car driver
- Geoffrey Morris as Squire
- Vivian Pickles as Jean Fairfax
- Jimmy Rhodes as Harry
- Maurice Rhodes as boy with dog
- Edward V. Robson as Mr. Fairfax
- Alan Tilvern as Max
- Anthony Verney as police orderly

== Reception ==
The Monthly Film Bulletin wrote: "This is one of the good films destined for the young. It has no moral axe to grind and no child could help enjoying it. The heroine is a normal child full of common sense and courage. The film is full of thrills and incident, and the country scenes summery and pleasant."

Kine Weekly wrote: "There is plenty of action before the villains are captured, including a canal jump, a tussle with the thieves and a car chase. Good acting by the juvenile star. Entertaining short for club audiences."

In Sight and Sound Janet Hills wrote: "Miss Mary C. Parnaby and Mr. Maurice T. Woodhouse, reporting on children's cinema clubs in a 1947 B.F.I. pamphlet, thought that the C.E.F. film Jean's Plan, although showing a genuine appreciation of young audiences' needs and interests, left too little to the imagination. They felt that suggestion would have been more effective than the somewhat detailed exposition."
