= Quinton, Northamptonshire =

Village in Northamptonshire, England

Coordinates: 52.1833°N 0.8679°W

Quinton
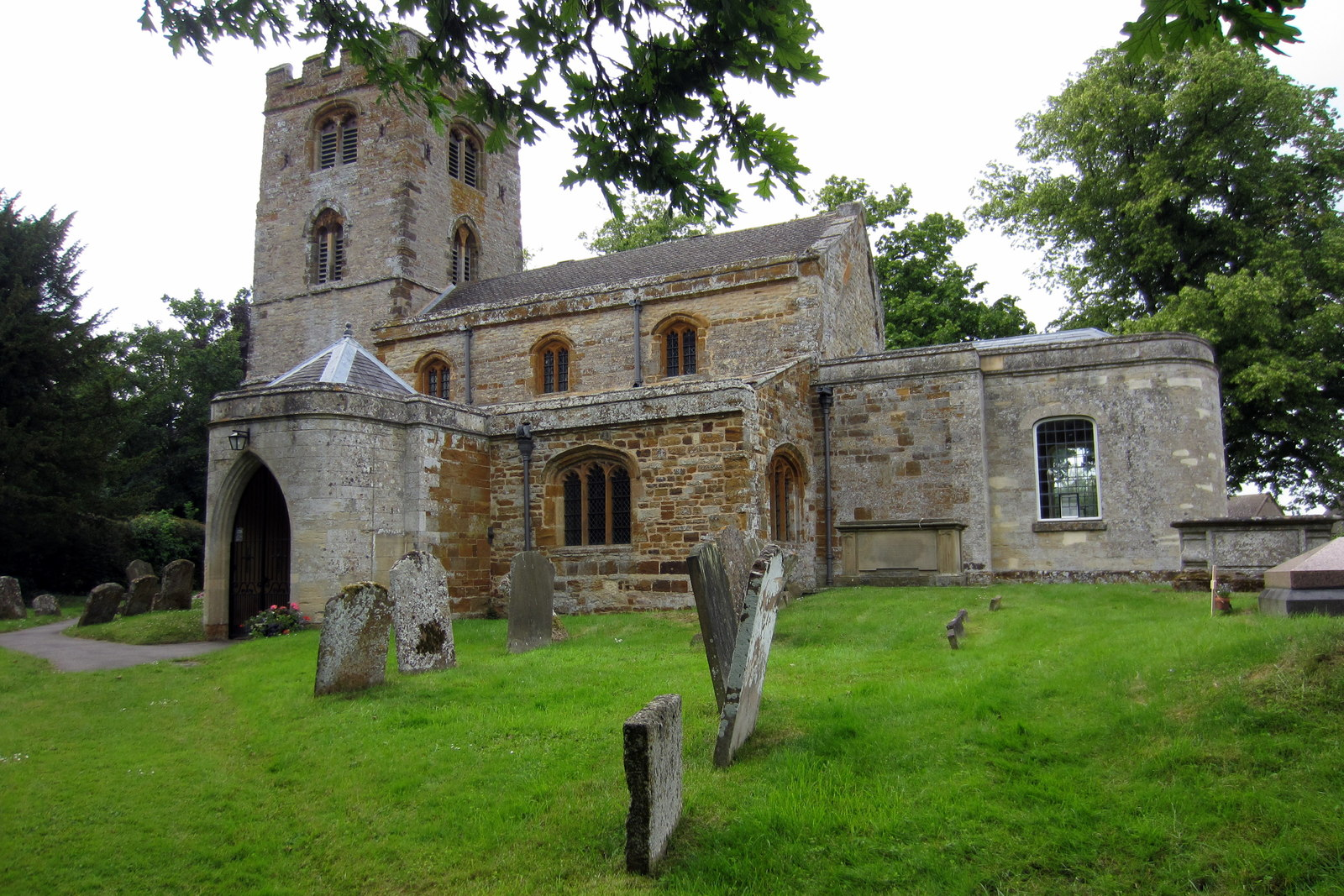
- Church of St John the Baptist, Quinton

- Location within Northamptonshire
- Population: 194 (2001 Census); 204 (2011 census)
- OS grid reference: SP776543
  - London: 66 miles (106 km)
- Civil parish: Quinton
- Unitary authority: West Northamptonshire
- Ceremonial county: Northamptonshire
- Region: East Midlands
- Country: England
- Sovereign state: United Kingdom
- Post town: NORTHAMPTON
- Postcode district: NN7
- Dialling code: 01604
- Police: Northamptonshire
- Fire: Northamptonshire
- Ambulance: East Midlands
- UK Parliament: Northampton South

Quinton is a village and civil parish in West Northamptonshire, England. It is about 5 miles (8.0 km) south of Northampton town centre along the road from Wootton to Hanslope, near Salcey Forest.

The village's name means 'Queen's farm/settlement'; or perhaps 'farm/settlement of Cwena' or 'woman's farm/settlement'.

== Geography ==
The parish borders the parishes of Wootton, Hackleton, Hartwell, Ashton, Roade, Courteenhall and Grange Park. The latter housing estate, effectively all but an urban expansion of Northampton, is only 500 yards away across some fields.

=== Preston Green ===
Urban expansion of Northampton was being planned in October 2008 which would absorb the village in its entirety.

== Demographics ==
The 2001 census shows a population of 194 people, 90 male, 104 female in 72 dwellings, increasing to 204 at the 2011 census.

== Buildings ==
The Parish Church is dedicated to St John the Baptist, mostly remodelled in 1801, though the tower is 13th century and there are Norman parts. There is a notable monument to Eleanor Maccalum (d.1909) in the churchyard of terracotta with angels at the head and foot.
