= Silesia (cloth) =

Twilled woven cloth made of linen or cotton

Silesia (Sleazy, Slesia) was a thin twilled woven cloth made of linen or cotton. The term denoted a wide range of fabric grades from greige goods to dyed and finished cloth. Silesia was used for various linens, for lining clothes, and in window blinds. Cotton Silesia was calendered to obtain a gloss finish.

== History ==
The fabric was originally manufactured in Silesia, a province of Prussia. Poor-grade Silesia was used to make cheap clothing in 18th-Century Britain and America, where the name was corrupted into “sleazy”. George Washington described the uniform of the Continental Army as “a suit made of thin, sleazy cloth without lining.”
