= National education campaign in the United Kingdom (1837–1870) =

National education campaign in pre-1870 UK

The three decades before the passing of the Elementary Education Act 1870 (33 & 34 Vict. c. 75) saw a national education campaign in the United Kingdom, carried out by a wide range of activist groups. In this period the debate on education was usually framed in terms of "national education" (i.e. universal state education) and its characteristics: fee-paying or free, compulsory or voluntary (and to what age), religious, non-denominational, or secular, inspection. A committee of the Privy Council on national education was set up in 1839.

The National Public Schools Association (NPSA), founded 1850, was a significant and prominent English pressure group campaigning for elementary education. It built on strong feelings in favour of education that was independent of the Church of England, centred on Manchester. Those who took part had often been involved in other reforming and radical causes. But no one group can be said to have determined the eventual shape of the 1870 Act.

== 1830s ==
At the beginning of the reign of Queen Victoria, state control of the education system was opposed by Anglican churchmen, such as James Shergold Boone. The status quo in England and Wales consisted of the two elementary school systems run by the National Society for Promoting Religious Education (Anglican) and the British and Foreign School Society (non-sectarian). The 1830s saw efforts to change elementary education to a system more effective in educating children in the major industrial cities, in particular. The Central Society for Education of 1836, drawing its ideas from the USA, with its non-religious schools, and Richard Whately's national education pilot in Ireland, had a strong base in parliament. Yet it proved vulnerable to the claim that secular education would disadvantage the poor, and was short-lived.

The Manchester Society for promoting National Education (1837) followed the lead of the Central Society, and opened three schools in 1838. It too did not survive long: the government showed no interest in non-sectarian education.

== 1840s and 1850s ==
The Lancashire Public Schools Association (LPSA) was founded in 1847, by a group of seven including Alexander Ireland and Samuel Lucas, drawing heavily on Anti-Corn Law League activists; and was dominated by Unitarians. A setpiece debate between William McKerrow and George Osborn on 28 March 1849 in Manchester saw the amendment by Osborn and Hugh Stowell to an Association petition, to ensure a Christian education, carried by a small margin.

In 1850 the LPSA became the National Public Schools Association (NPSA). During the 1850s it campaigned for an education system that was secular or non-sectarian, having financial support from local rates and under political control.

Richard Cobden and William Johnson Fox were national leaders of the NPSA, and the educational system of Massachusetts taken as a model. In the mid-1850s, a number of education bills were introduced in parliament, one drafted for the NPSA originating in 1855 with Cobden, Thomas Milner Gibson and Thomas Emerson Headlam. Nothing came of them. At the local level, John Watts in 1852 there was common ground for the NPSA and campaigners against the "taxes on knowledge".

== 1860s ==
Locally, the NPSA in Manchester was followed in 1864 by the Manchester Educational Aid Society, which campaigned for compulsory primary education. It involved particularly McKerrow.

== Aftermath ==
=== National Education Union (1869) ===
The National Education Union was founded in 1869 also, in reaction to the National Education League. Its support was Anglican, with some Methodists and Roman Catholics.
