= Piddington, Northamptonshire =

Village in Northamptonshire, England

Coordinates: 52.18344°N 0.82778°W

Piddington
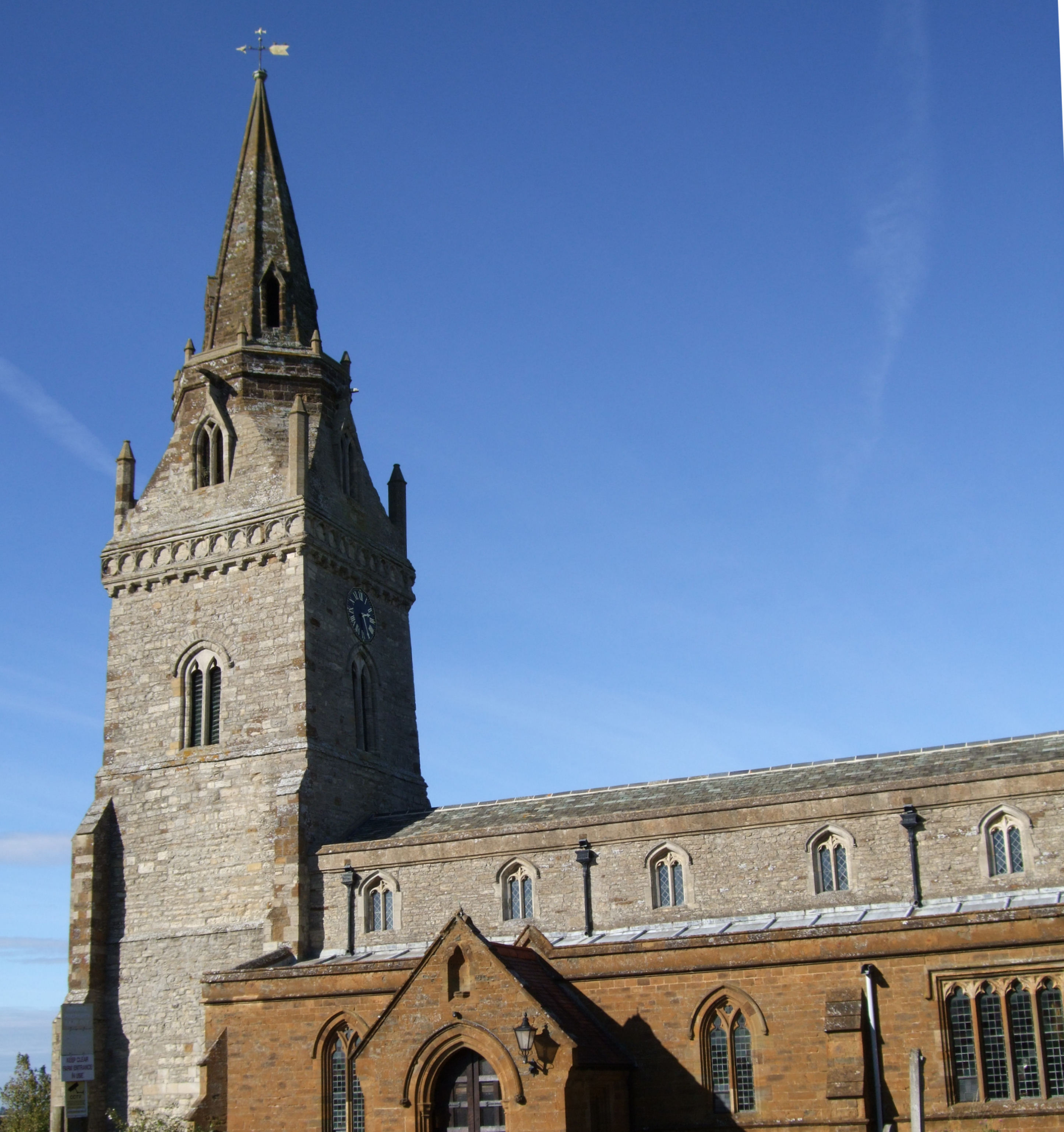
- Piddington: Church of St John the Baptist

- Location within Northamptonshire
- OS grid reference: SP802545
  - London: 65 miles (105 km)
- Civil parish: Hackleton
- Unitary authority: West Northamptonshire
- Ceremonial county: Northamptonshire
- Region: East Midlands
- Country: England
- Sovereign state: United Kingdom
- Post town: NORTHAMPTON
- Postcode district: NN7
- Dialling code: 01604
- Police: Northamptonshire
- Fire: Northamptonshire
- Ambulance: East Midlands
- UK Parliament: Northampton South

Piddington is a village and former civil parish, now in the parish of Hackleton, in the West Northamptonshire district, in the ceremonial county of Northamptonshire, England. It is in the south of Northamptonshire, just north of Buckinghamshire. It is 6 miles (10 km) south of Northampton town centre, in a cul-de-sac off the main road at the War Memorial in the village of Hackleton, and about 1 mile (2 km) south-west of there. It has a geographic size of 1,693 acres (685 ha) and an average height of 300 ft (91 m), rising steadily to 400 ft (120 m) in Salcey Forest. In 1931 the parish had a population of 342.

== Governance ==
On 1 April 1935 the parish was abolished and merged with Hackleton. The village is part of Hackleton parish council, which also covers the nearby villages of Preston Deanery and Horton.

== History ==
The village name is derived from the Old English meaning "farm/settlement connected with Pyda".

In a field near Piddington is the site of the Piddington Roman Villa. In Roman times, one of the most important roads in the country, used to transport troops, ran through the village.

Several residents of Piddington and neighbouring village Hackleton were part of the dissenter church movement in the 18th century. The missionary William Carey lived in Hackleton, where he worked as an apprentice shoemaker, and later briefly in Piddington with his wife Dorothy Placket, before departing on his voyage with the Baptist Missionary Society to Bengal. The couple were married in St John the Baptist Church, Piddington in 1781. Initially Dorothy had refused to accompany William on his voyage, but with all decided and farewells written, the missionary party were denied a licence to travel on a vessel of the East India Company by the company directors. The opportunity then arose to travel in a Danish East Indiaman, and Dorothy was finally persuaded to leave Piddington and join her husband and son, Felix.

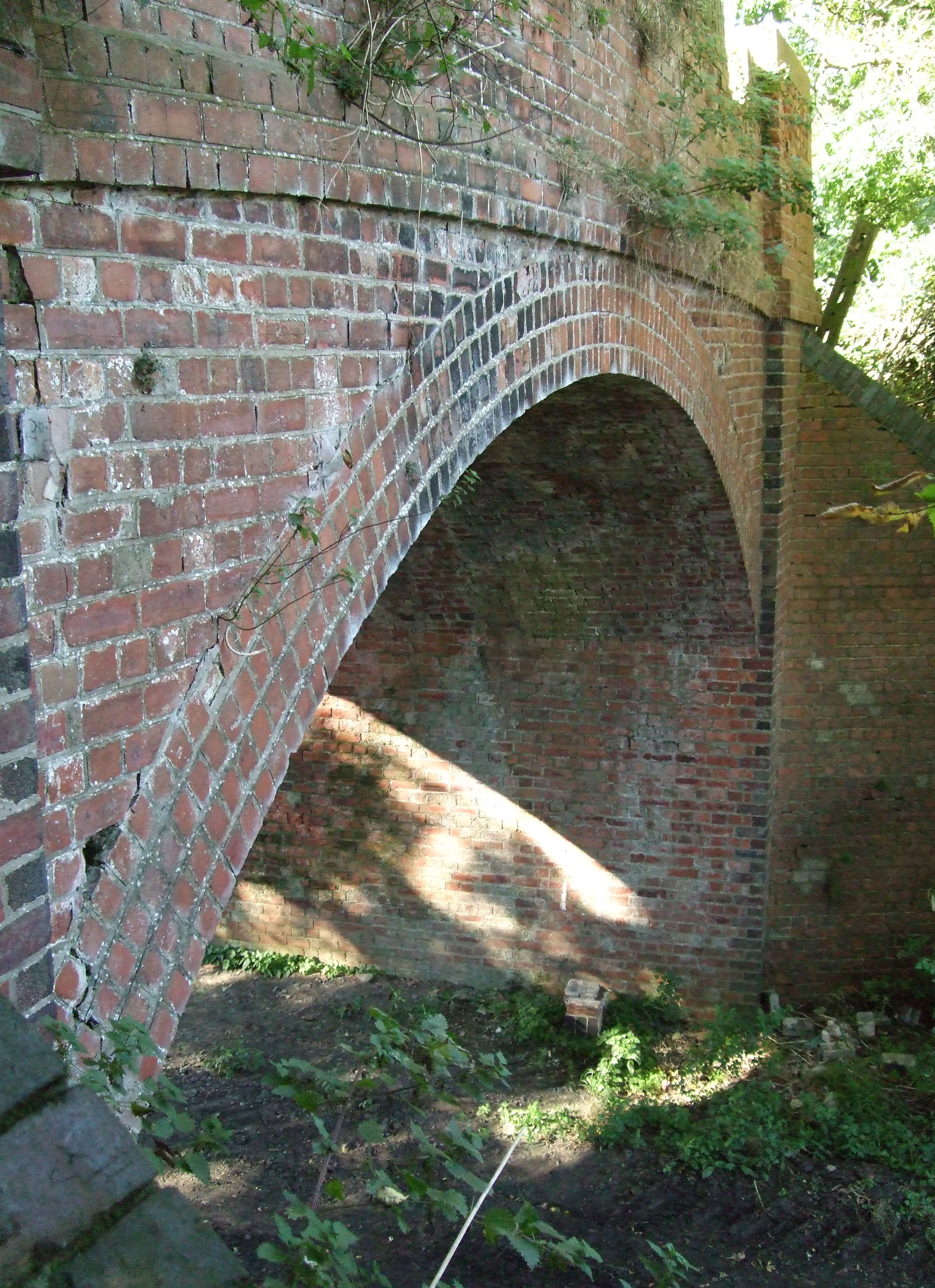
Old SMJ railway bridge south of the village

By the 1870s, Piddington was linked to the national rail network by the Bedford to Northampton Line which provided a station to serve the village. The Stratford and Midland Junction Railway, known as the "SMJ", also opened a station at Salcey Forest to the south of Horton village. This part of the line ran from Towcester to Blisworth and Stoke Bruerne with a connection to Northampton and the West Coast Main Line. It closed to passengers in 1951, and was later shut completely as part of the 1960s Beeching cuts. The route of the line is just to the southeast of the village and is clearly visible, with a railway bridge marked with a weight restriction, at the side of the chicken farm. The track bed is intact but the railway bridge is cracked, possibly caused by a vehicle collision.

To the west of the village, there is a disused quarry marked on Ordnance Survey maps but barely visible due to a copse of trees. This was used for lime burning up until 1924/25. The stream, Wootton Brook, running from Horton to Preston Deanery very close to the village on the north side was once the divide between the hamlet of Hackleton and Piddington, but in 1935 the amalgamation of the parishes created the civil parish of Hackleton.

== Facilities ==
It consists of approximately 300 houses, a church and a "pocket park". The Pocket Park, more formally known as Longland Meadow, was gifted by the Longland family to the parish and was previously a private field for livestock.

There was a pub "The Spread Eagle", on Forest Road, which leads to Salcey Forest. Unfortunately this has now been closed down due to a lack of interest in ownership. A second pub, "The White Hart", is on the main road in Hackleton.

A village shop on Forest Road, the main road in the village, closed in the 1980s. The village is now served by the village shop and Post Office in nearby Hackleton. A petrol station and garage on Forest Road have also long since gone.

The village church, St. John the Baptist dates from c.1290, although the majority of it has been added since. It is also believed there was a place of worship on the site before.

== Famous people ==
- William Carey, Baptist missionary to India, shoemaker and resident.
- Allan Lamb, international cricketer and former resident.
- Margaret K. Wright, designer and embroiderer who exhibited internationally, ran workshops in Piddington for 21 years.
