= Hackleton =

Village in Northamptonshire, England

Coordinates: 52.18879°N 0.82295°W

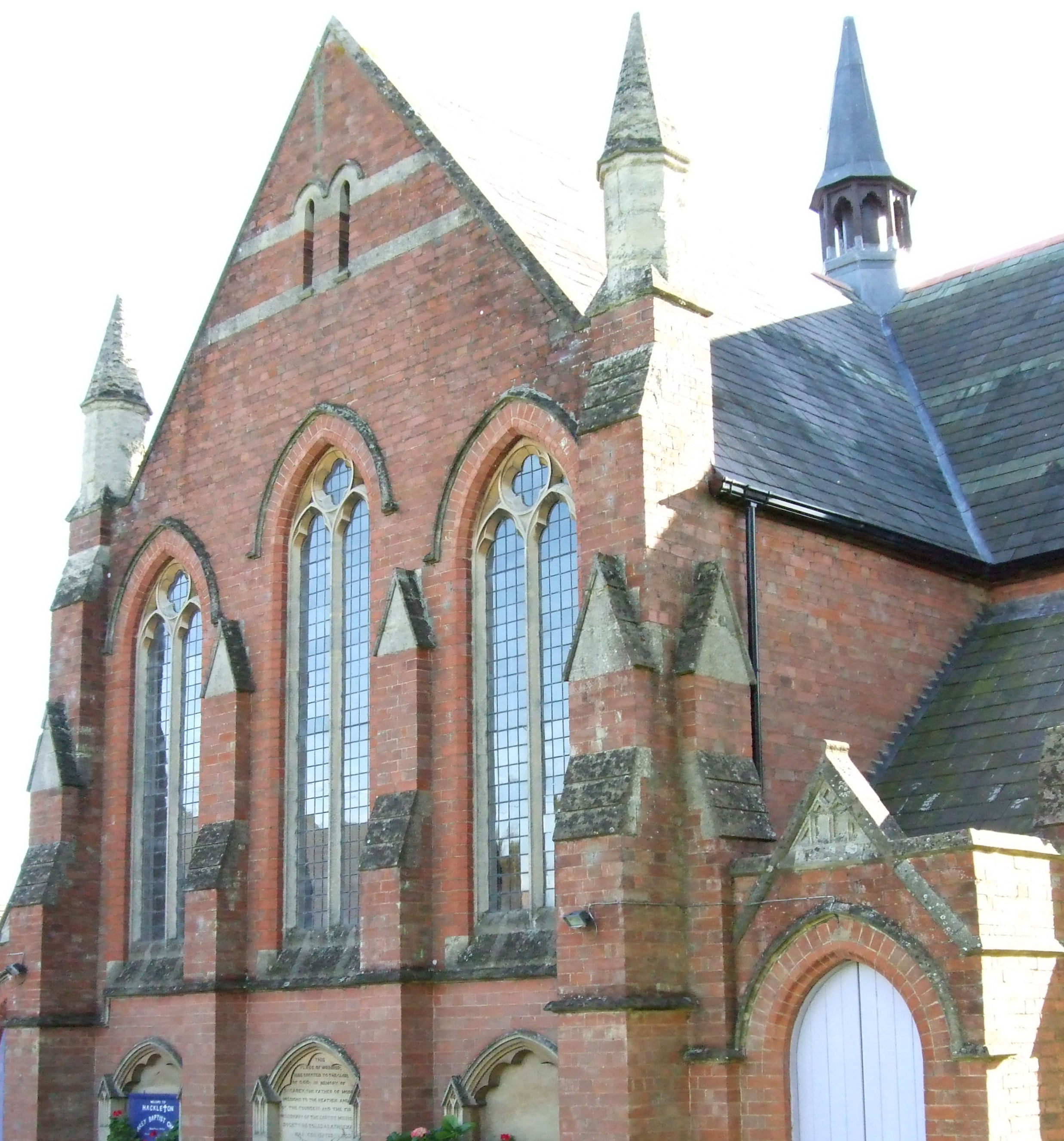
- William Carey Baptist Chapel

- Location within Northamptonshire
- Interactive map of Hackleton
- Population: 1,568 (2001 census); 2,054 (2011 Census)
- OS grid reference: SP805550
  - London: 64 miles (103 km)
- Civil parish: Hackleton
- Unitary authority: West Northamptonshire
- Ceremonial county: Northamptonshire
- Region: East Midlands
- Country: England
- Sovereign state: United Kingdom
- Post town: NORTHAMPTON
- Postcode district: NN7
- Dialling code: 01604
- Police: Northamptonshire
- Fire: Northamptonshire
- Ambulance: East Midlands
- UK Parliament: Northampton South

Hackleton is a village and civil parish in the West Northamptonshire district, in Northamptonshire, England, just north of Buckinghamshire. It is 5 miles (8.0 km) south of Northampton town centre, and 2 miles (3.2 km) by road to the M1 London to Yorkshire motorway junction 15 and 11 miles (18 km) north of junction 14. London is 62 miles (100 km) south via junction 14 and 47 miles (76 km) southeast of Birmingham via junction 15. It lies on the busy B526 road (former A50) from Northampton to Newport Pagnell, between Horton and Wootton. The parish area is about 1,030 acres (420 ha).

The villages name means 'Farm/settlement connected with Haeccel'.

== Demographics ==
The Parish Council area covers several surrounding villages. For Hackleton, Piddington and Horton combined, and together with the surrounding rural area sparsely populated, the data shows 1,568 residents, 756 male and 812 female, living in 606 dwellings. The actual 2011 census was measured as a population (including Horton, Piddleton and Preston Deanery) of 2,054.

== Governance ==
The village has a parish council which also covers the nearby villages of Piddington, Preston Deanery and Horton as well as Hackleton.

== Facilities ==
The village school is Hackleton CofE Primary School. The village also has Hackleton Carey Baptist Chapel, Dudley Winterbottom Memorial Hall, The White Hart Pub and Hackleton Stores, the local village shop. Hackleton also used to be home to the Easyrider, a specialist upholstery shop dealing with sheep skin and wool products. Other amenities include 'The Rec'; local recreational ground, which is the home pitch for village side AFC Hackleton. There is also the local war memorial, a butcher and a 'pocket' park, formerly the land boundary between Hackleton and Piddington where a stream known as Wootton Brook flows to the west in a shallow valley.

Hackleton Carey Baptist Chapel was set up by William Carey, the English Protestant missionary and Baptist minister, known as the "father of modern missions." Carey was one of the founders of the Baptist Missionary Society. Carey came to the village to complete an apprenticeship at The Jetty, the street opposing where the chapel is built. In Hackleton there is also Carey Road, a slip road off the main road, named after him. The inscription on the chapel reads:

"This place of worship was erected to the glory of God: in memory of Dr Carey, the father of modern missions to the heathen, and one of the founders, and the first missionary of the Baptist Missionary Society; he toiled as a shoemaker, was converted to God and preached his first sermon in this village."

The village of Piddington, home to the parish church, St John the Baptist, in the Living Brook Benefice, and the Piddington Roman Villa, is nearby.

== Urban expansion of Northampton ==
Further urban expansion of Northampton, in an area called "Preston Green" was being planned in October 2008 with another 13,500 houses and additional infrastructure in the rural areas around Grange Park, Quinton and Preston Deanery. This never went ahead however.
