= Grange Park, Northamptonshire =

Coordinates: 52.18998°N 0.882900°W

Grange Park
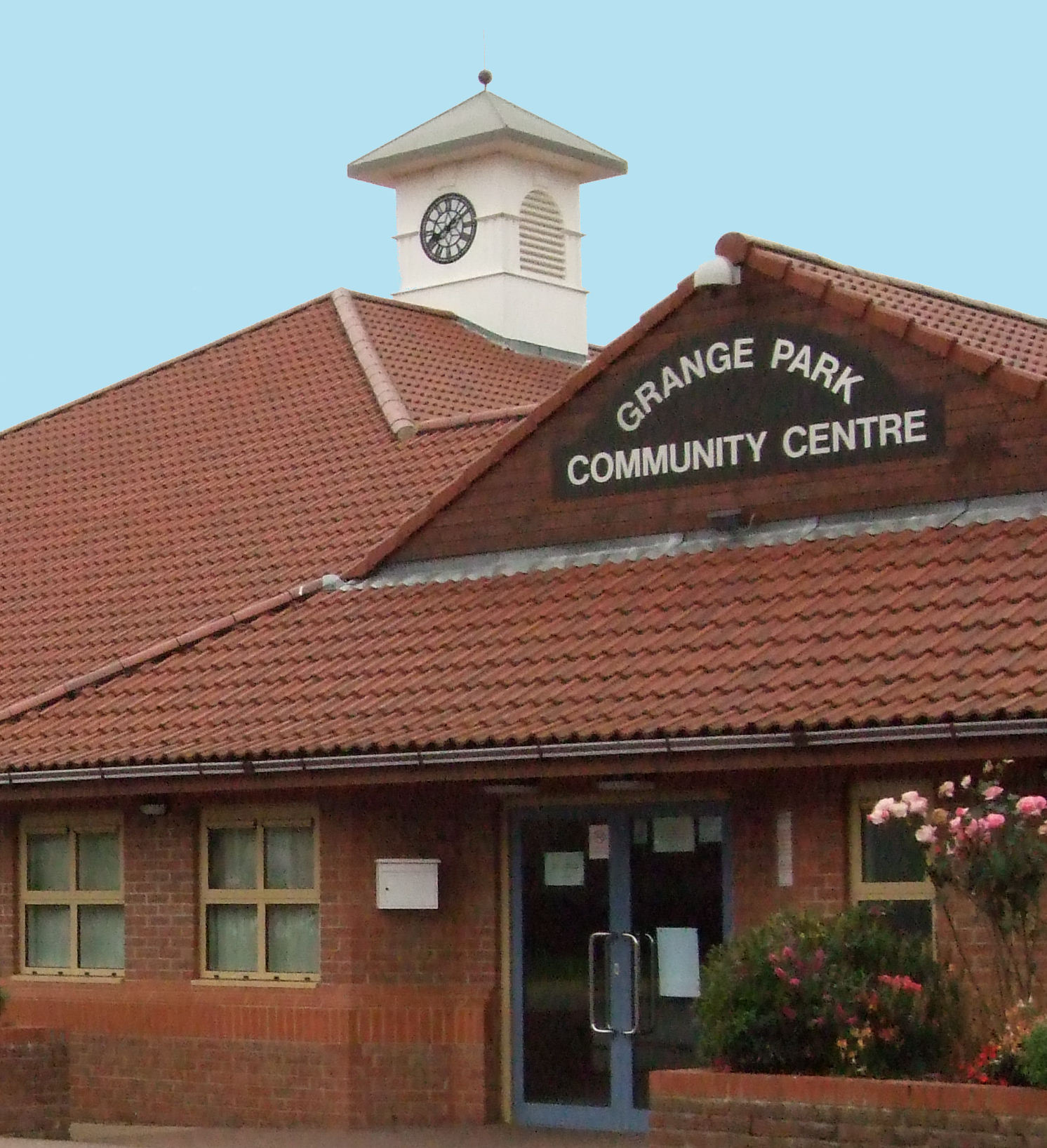
- Grange Park Community Centre; The Green, Grange Park, Northampton

- Location within Northamptonshire
- Population: 4,700 (2021 census)
- OS grid reference: SP675552
  - London: 65 miles (105 km)
- Civil parish: Grange Park
- Unitary authority: West Northamptonshire
- Ceremonial county: Northamptonshire
- Region: East Midlands
- Country: England
- Sovereign state: United Kingdom
- Post town: NORTHAMPTON
- Postcode district: NN4
- Dialling code: 01604
- Police: Northamptonshire
- Fire: Northamptonshire
- Ambulance: East Midlands
- UK Parliament: Northampton South
- Website: http://www.grangeparkpc.org

Grange Park is a village and a civil parish on the outskirts of Northampton in West Northamptonshire.

== History ==
The Northampton village was created from agricultural land belonging to Courteenhall Grange Farm in the late 1990s. Approval for the initial development of the Northampton estate was granted on 8 May 1998, initially for one thousand houses to be built along with amenities such as a primary school, a community centre, and country parks.

=== 2003 planned development of an IKEA store ===
In 2003, a sand pit which was a former domestic refuse site was the proposed location for a new IKEA store but after local opposition from members of the public, the store was built in Milton Keynes instead.

=== 2008 development of 450 new homes ===
In 2008, West Northamptonshire Development Corporation agreed on a new development of 450 new homes and a hotel in the same sand pit location where an IKEA store was planned in 2003 but the government decided that the 450 new homes would be built closer to the existing homes in the village rather than on the wasteland.

=== 2017 warehouses development ===
In 2017, three new warehouses were built in the sandpit location that was formerly the planned site for an IKEA and 450 new homes. Two of the warehouses are home to Clipper Logistics and the other one is home to an Amazon UK distribution centre.

=== 2019 planned development of 330 new homes ===
In January 2019, Manor Oak Homes published plans for 330 new homes. Most of the community are not opposed to the new development but many believe that there are not enough local services to cope with the new homes as the primary school, doctor's surgery, dental practice and pre-school are already at almost full capacity and with the 330 new homes, there are no new plans for further community buildings.

== Demographics ==
The population of Grange Park was 4,700 as of the 2021 Census. Prior to this, according to the 2001 Census the population was just 327 people, however the Northampton estate was relatively undeveloped at that time. A census is taken every ten years in the United Kingdom, the next one will be in the year 2031.

In the 2021 Census, 81.1% of the Grange Park population identified themselves as White British.

== Facilities ==
=== Schools ===
Woodland View Primary School is the only school in Grange Park, it caters for children in primary education from reception up until Year 6. For Secondary education, most children go to Caroline Chisholm School but there are numerous other secondary schools in the area that children can go to.

=== Community ===
The estate has numerous community facilities such as a community centre, a sports pavilion and a religious centre. These are home for numerous clubs and youth groups such as Scouts and sports clubs.

There is also a doctors surgery, a dental practice and a daycare for members of the community to use.

=== Commercial ===
Grange Park have a Co-op Food supermarket, a Harvester restaurant, a marstons pub, some take away and hairdresser establishments. There are also two hotels in Grange Park which are in a prime location for business persons due to how close the Northampton estate is to the M1 motorway.

=== Industrial ===
There is a small industrial estate in Grange Park which contain numerous warehouses used as distribution centres for logistics companies. There are also three warehouses that are outside of the industrial estate which are operated by Clipper and Amazon. Grange Park is also a prime location as a logistics hub due to how close the M1 motorway and the A45 trunk road are.

== Politics ==
=== Parish council ===
Grange Park Parish Council has 12 members who are elected every four years.

=== Unitary Authority ===
Following local government restructuring the Northampton estate is governed by West Northamptonshire council. Prior to this it was in the South Northamptonshire and had two councillors who were responsible for "Grange Ward". Councillor Andrew Grant and Councillor Adil Sadygov both members of the Conservative party. It was also represented on Northamptonshire County Council by one councillor who was responsible for "Hackleton and Grange Park Ward". The last councillor for this ward was Councillor Michael Clarke, a member of the Conservative party.

== Transport ==
Grange Park is close to the Northampton loop of the West Coast Main Line. This carries trains from Northampton to London Euston via Milton Keynes Central.

Peak travel times by rail by West Midlands Trains and Avanti West Coast services in minutes are: from Northampton to Central London 46, to Birmingham 65; from Milton Keynes to Central London 40 and Manchester 120.

The estate borders on the M1 motorway to the south-east and A45 to the west and north.

Typical travel times in minutes by road (peak times in italics) are:

- Central London (via M1) 75 (110)
- Birmingham (via M1/M6) 45 (60)
- Manchester, (via M1/M6/M62) 120 (175)
- Leicester (via M1) 50 (65)
- Oxford (via A43) 50 (60)
- Cambridge (via A45/A14) 85 (130)
- Milton Keynes (via A508) 20 (30)

Airports at Heathrow, Gatwick, and London Stansted as well as Birmingham Airport are all within easy reach.

Grange Park is also on the Stagecoach Midlands X6 bus route between Milton Keynes and Northampton via Roade. The main local routes for the area also include the routes 11/11A which also bypass Wootton and Hardingstone.

== Sources ==
- (Google Maps)
