= Gilly Flower =

British actress (1908–2001)

- Flower as Miss Tibbs in Fawlty Towers
- Born: Gertrude Adele Jacobs; 26 August 1908; London, England
- Died: 17 February 2001 (aged 92); Surrey, England
- Occupations: Actress; model
- Years active: 1932–1991

Gilly Flower (26 August 1908 – 17 February 2001) was an English actress and model, best remembered as the elderly Miss Abitha Tibbs in the BBC sitcoms Fawlty Towers and Only Fools and Horses.

Flower played Miss Tibbs in all twelve episodes of the show, which was produced in two six-episode series separated by a three-and-a-half-year interval.

A Londoner, Flower had her first film role in 1932 and, with the advent of television in Britain, she found a new outlet for her talents, continuing to appear in such programmes as Z-Cars, Steptoe and Son and The Fall and Rise of Reginald Perrin. Early in her career, Flower was also a model and seven portrait photographs taken by Bassano, in which she is modelling hats from Kembray, may today be found in the collection of the National Portrait Gallery.

Flower retired from acting in 1991.

== Filmography ==
=== Film ===
Year	Title	Role	Notes
1932	The New Hotel		
1968	Work Is a Four-Letter Word	Auntie Winnie	

=== Television ===
Year	Title	Role	Notes
1962	Six More Faces of Jim		2 episodes
1965	The Wednesday Play	The Unconfident	Episode: "The Confidence Course"
1965–1966	Crossroads King's Oak	Mrs. Templeton	4 episodes
1966	Seven Deadly Sins	Group B Member (uncredited)	Episode: "The Erpingham Camp"
1968	Beggar My Neighbour	Civil Defence volunteer	Episode: "Whiter Shade of Yellow"
1968	The Root of All Evil?	Party guest	Episode: "Money for Change"
1969	Wink to Me Only	1st Woman	Episode: "The Vacuum Affair"
1969	Not in Front of the Children	Housekeeper	Episode: "Stand on Ceremony"
1970	Morning Story	Mrs. Johnson	Television film
1970	The Culture Vultures	Secretary	Episode: #1.1
1971	Doomwatch	Woman (uncredited)	2 episodes
1971	Comedy Playhouse	Miss Travers	Episode: "The Importance of Being Hairy"
1971	Bachelor Father	Housewife	Episode: "Economy Class"
1972	Emma		Mini Series
1972	My Wife Next Door	The Maid	Episode: "Joint Assignment"
1972	Upstairs, Downstairs	Woman at Courtroom (uncredited)	Episode: "A Special Mischief"
1973	Softly, Softly: Task Force	Landlady (uncredited)	Episode: "Time-Table"
1973	Z Cars	Customer (uncredited)	Episode: "Skin Game"
1973	Pardon My Genie	Cousin Edna (uncredited)	Episode: "Commercial Success"
1973	Oh, Father!	Draper's Assistant	Episode: "A Little Law"
1970–1974	Play for Today	Mary (The Maid) Non-speaking extra	2 episodes
1973–1974	Thriller	Miss Cardiff Pub guest	2 episodes
1974	Happy Ever After	Hotel guest	Episode: "The Hotel"
1972–1974	Steptoe and Son	Alice Mrs. Sheldon	2 episodes
1975	Second Time Around	Marjorie	Episode: "Father to Be (or Not to Be)
1975	My Honourable Mrs	Miss Birdwood	Episode: "While the Cat's Away"
1975	The Growing Pains of P.C. Penrose	Lady Magistrate	Episode: "Among Those Appearing"
1975	The Dick Emery Show		Episode: #14.11
1974–1975	Within These Walls	Woman (uncredited)	2 episodes
1977	Beryl's Lot	Mrs. Norris	4 episodes
1977	General Hospital	Woman patient	Episode: "Sons and Daughters"
1977	Ripping Yarns	Jehovah's Witnesses	Episode: "Murder at Moorstones Manor"
1977	The Fall and Rise of Reginald Perrin	The woman with fur	Episode: "The Unusual Shop"
1978	Angels	Mrs. Black	Episode: "The Visitor"
1975–1979	Fawlty Towers	Miss Abitha Tibbs	12 episodes
1980	Heartland	Mrs. Barnes	Episode: "Last Knockings"
1980	How's Your Father?	Old Lady	Episode: "Fantasy Time"
1971–1980	The Two Ronnies	Mrs. B Woman	2 episodes
1981	Blood Money	Molly Irons	2 episodes
1982	Terry and June	Mrs. Good	Episode: "The Auction"
1980–1983	Potter	Lady Motorist Lily	2 episodes
1983	Juliet Bravo	Old Lady	Episode: "Doors"
1983	Only Fools and Horses	Miss Agatha Tibbs	Episode: "Homesick"
1984	The Fainthearted Feminist	Woman in supermarket	Episode: #1.2
1984	That's My Boy	Lady White	Episode: "Unfair Dismissal"
1984	Ever Decreasing Circles	Old Lady	Episode: "The Tea Party"
1985	Relative Strangers	Customer	Episode: #1.9
1986	Lenny Henry Tonite		Episode: "Pratt Outta Hell"
1985–1987	The Mistress	Customer Elderly woman Lady in shop	3 episodes
1987	Hello Mum		Episode: #1.2
