= Trevor Adams =

English television actor (1946–2000)

- Born: 19 May 1946
- Died: 15 December 2000 (aged 54)
- Occupation: Actor
- Years active: 1967-1982

Trevor Michael Adams (19 May 1946 – 15 December 2000) was a British actor, best remembered for his portrayal of Tony Webster in the BBC TV sitcom series The Fall and Rise of Reginald Perrin (1976–79), and Alan in the Fawlty Towers TV sitcom episode "The Wedding Party" (1975).

Adams attended the then Harold Hill Grammar School, in Harold Hill, Essex, from 1957 to 1964, and played leading roles in a number of school plays. Later he trained at RADA and was a member of the National Youth Theatre. He spent a year at Stratford-upon-Avon before turning to television, where he was often cast as a criminal. He had roles in the films Groupie Girl (1970) and Private Road (1971), and appeared in TV dramas in Britain, notably the crime series Public Eye, The Professionals, Z-Cars, The New Avengers and Dixon of Dock Green.

Adams left the acting profession in 1982, before moving to Norwich and retraining as a solicitor. His workload prevented him from appearing in the 1996 follow-up to The Fall and Rise of Reginald Perrin, entitled The Legacy of Reginald Perrin.

Adams died after a lengthy battle with cancer.

== Filmography ==
=== Film ===
Year	Title	Role	Notes
1970	Groupie Girl	Barry	
1970	Julius Caesar	Servant to Caesar #1	
1971	Private Road	Alex Marvel	

=== Television ===
Year	Title	Role	Notes
1967	Z-Cars	Driver	Episode: "A Right to Live: Part 2"
1968	Honey Lane	Young Man	Episode: "The Matchmakers"
1968	ITV Playhouse	Man at Party	Episode: "The Judge"
1970	Softly, Softly: Task Force	Duggan	Episode: "Do Me a Favour"
1971	The Ten Commandments	Derek	Episode: "An Object of Affection"
1971	...And Mother Makes Three	TV Repair Man	Episode: "The Matchmakers"
1972	Man of Straw	Student	Episode: "Young Love"
1972	Dixon of Dock Green	Rick	Episode: "Mrs. Raven"
1972	Public Eye	Farmer	Episode: "Many a Slip"
1972	Crown Court	Mark Lieberman	Episode: "Lieberman v Savage"
1973	Christmas Pantomime: Robin Hood	Will Scarlett	TV film
1974	How's Your Father?	Rodney	Episode: "That's the Ticket"
1975	Play for Today	Boy	Episode: "Goodbye"
1975	Village Hall	George	Episode: "The Rough and the Smooth"
1975	My Honourable Mrs	Patrick	Episode: "A Home from Home from Home"
1975	Fawlty Towers	Alan	Episode: "The Wedding Party"
1975	Omnibus	Luigi	Episode: "Thomas Mann: The Fight Against Death"
1976	Crown Court	Martin Pettigrew	Episode: "A Bang or a Whimper"
1976-1979	The Fall and Rise of Reginald Perrin	Tony Webster	Series regular
1977	The New Avengers	Sandy	Episode: "Dead Men Are Dangerous"
1977-1978	The Professionals	Benny, CI5 Agent	3 episodes
1982	The Funny Side of Christmas	Tony Webster	TV film
