= Horton, Northamptonshire =

Village in Northamptonshire, England

Coordinates: 52.1827°N 0.8041°W

Horton
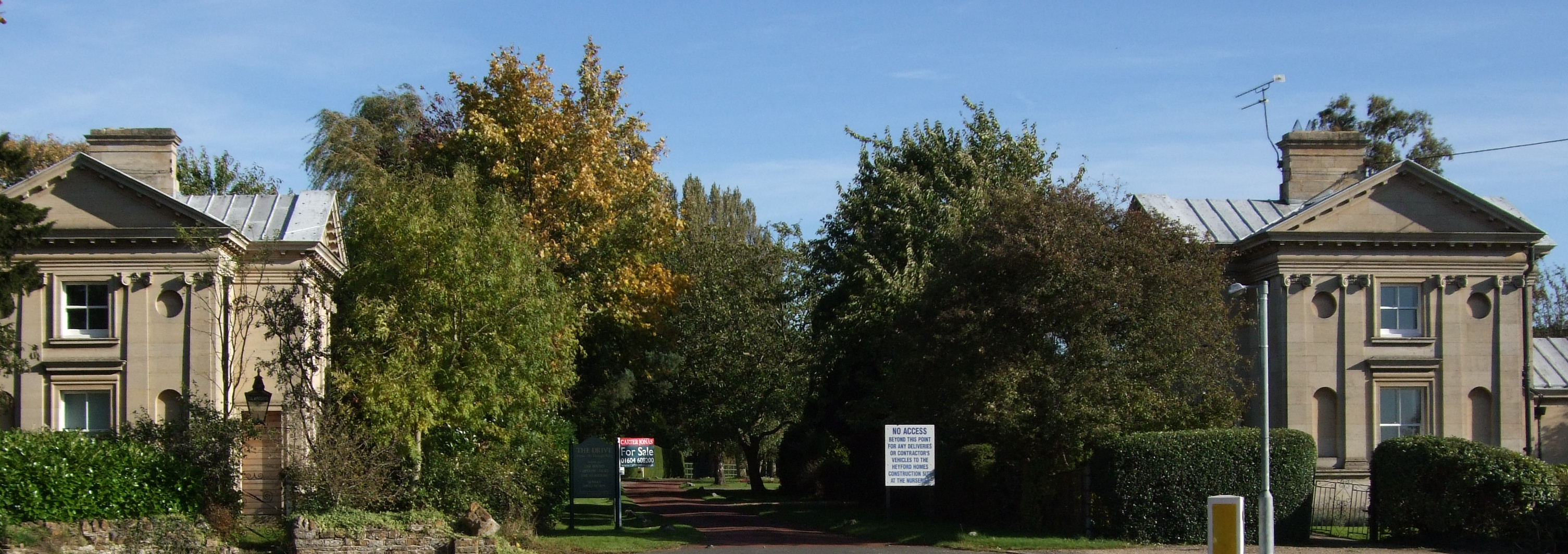
- Lodges at the entrance to the demolished Horton House.

- Location within Northamptonshire
- Population: 433 (2010 est.)
- OS grid reference: SP8254
  - London: 53.8 miles (87 km)
- Civil parish: Hackleton
- Unitary authority: West Northamptonshire
- Ceremonial county: Northamptonshire
- Region: East Midlands
- Country: England
- Sovereign state: United Kingdom
- Post town: NORTHAMPTON
- Postcode district: NN7
- Dialling code: 01604
- Police: Northamptonshire
- Fire: Northamptonshire
- Ambulance: East Midlands
- UK Parliament: Northampton

Horton is a village and former civil parish, now in the parish of Hackleton, in West Northamptonshire, England. The village manor, Horton Hall, now demolished, was home to the first governor of the Bank of England and William Parr, 1st Baron Parr of Horton. An outline of its former nucleus can be seen in neighbouring fields, by its grade II park and garden which features an ornamental bridge.

== Topography ==
The village is 5 miles (8.0 km) south south-east of Northampton and about 8 miles (13 km) north of Newport Pagnell The B526 was formerly the A50, important as the major stagecoach route connecting Leicester and London.

== The church ==
The Norman church is dedicated to St. Mary Magdalene. It has a 13th-century western tower and a "splendid curly weathervane". Much of it was rebuilt between 1862 and 1863 by a local architect Edmund Francis Law. It has various monuments: a brass relating to Roger Salisbury (1491) and his two wives; Lord and Lady Parr, Katherine Parr's uncle and aunt; a free standing tomb-chest; two recumbent effigies of Sir William Lane and his family, and Edward and Henrietta Montagu, members of the family of the Earl of Halifax.

The church was formally closed for worship at the end of 2012, after being shut for some years, the cost of repairs and maintenance having been found unsustainable. Following the uniting of the parish with Piddington to form the new parish of Piddington with Horton, the village is now served by the Church of St. John the Baptist in Piddington as part of the Living Brook Benefice.

== Horton House estate ==
=== The earlier estate ===
The place-name Horton is a common one in England. It derives from Old English horu 'dirt' and tūn 'settlement, farm, estate', presumably meaning 'farm on muddy soil'.

The original medieval village and house were demolished to make way for the rebuilding of the house in the 17th century – all that remains are a number of mounds in the fields to the south and east of the house remains.

The first house and estate were owned by William, Lord Parr of Horton – the same family that Katherine Parr came from. She was the last of the six wives of Henry VIII of England. William, Lord Parr of Horton was her uncle. Parr's daughter, Maud, married Sir Ralph Lane and they had five sons including: Sir Ralph, Sir Robert, Sir Parr and Sir William, the latter commemorated in the church.

=== The last house ===
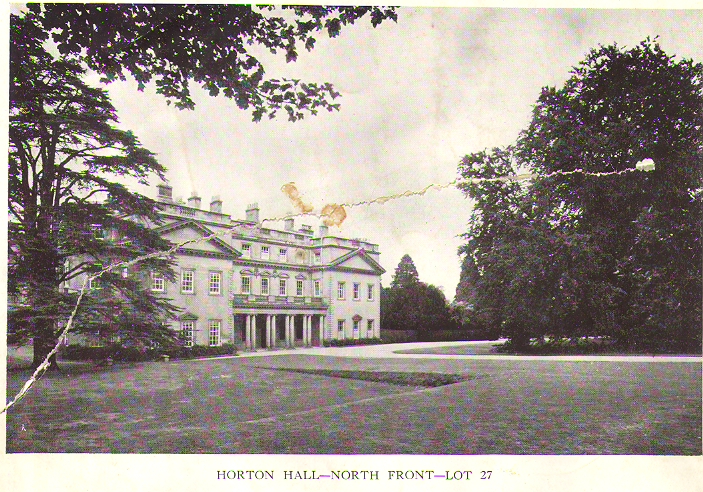
Horton Hall in 1935 (North front)

Horton Hall in 1830

The last house had originally belonged to a branch of the Montagu family (who held the Earldom of Halifax for two generations). Charles Montagu, 1st Earl of Halifax KG, PC, FRS (16 April 1661 – 19 May 1715) was an English poet and statesman, one of the commissioners of the Treasury, a member of the Privy Council and Chancellor of the Exchequer. At the accession of George I, he was made Viscount Sunbury and Earl of Halifax, with remainder to heirs male, a Knight of the Garter, and First Lord of the Treasury. The Gunnings purchased the estate in 1782 and the family stayed at Horton until 1888 when the 5th Baronet sold it to Pickering Phipps of the brewing family. Later it was sold to George Winterbottom but it was demolished in 1936 However, some of its out-buildings remain, many Grade II listed: the Green Bridge; The Ice House and the New Temple, which has an Ionic portico with a pulvinated frieze – and is thought be early Georgian in date.

- The menagerie, turned into a house by Gervase Jackson-Stops is Grade II* listed. This is a one-storey building with corner pavilions and a raised central area. The surrounding windows are in the style of the architect James Gibbs. The work has most recently been attributed to Thomas Wright, the astronomer, who undertook work for Lord Halifax after 1739.
- The Arches, also Grade II. These are made up of a tri-partite triumphal archway with Ionic pilasters.
- Two Victorian gate lodges, see image in infobox top right
- Red brick stable block, c. 18th century

Near the menagerie is an old fish pond dating back several centuries and what are thought to be the remains of a Norman motte-and-bailey can be found in the fields behind the menagerie. There are rumoured to be a series of tunnels from the menagerie towards the ice house and elsewhere.

== Economy ==
The village is subsidiary greatly to Hackleton and somewhat to Northampton and Milton Keynes, having no shops or pubs. Horton has a cricket club, Horton House CC, which celebrated its centenary in 2008 and offers Senior and Junior Cricket.

Its largest amenity is "The New French Partridge" hotel and restaurant, a former coaching inn.

== Civil parish ==
In 1931 the parish had a population of 139. On 1 April 1935 the parish was abolished and merged with Hackleton.

== Landmarks ==
=== Horton Rounds: The house on a circle ===
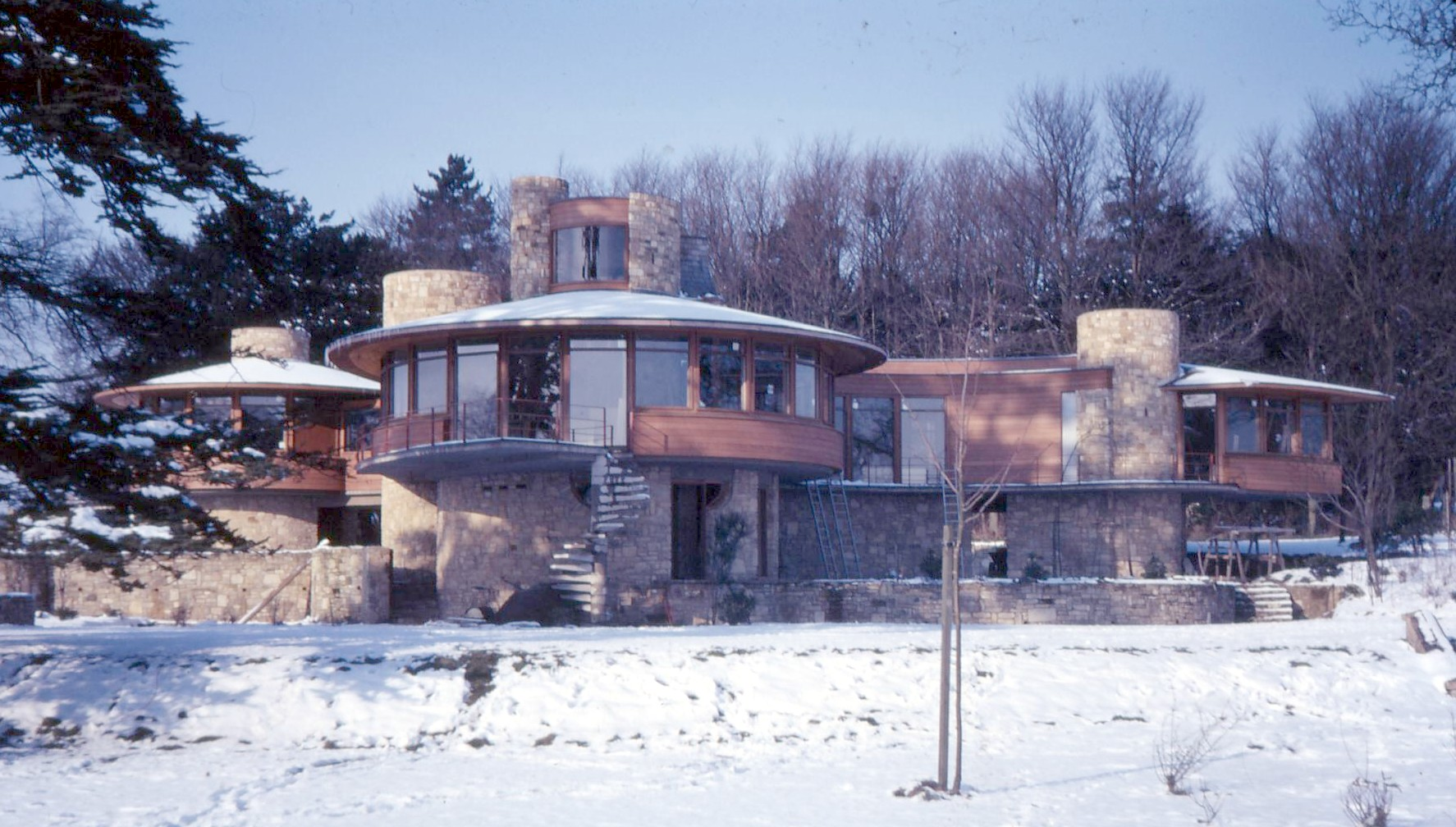
Horton Rounds - the house on a circle

This pioneering modern design for a curved house on stilts is in the floor plan shapes of a comma and a full stop. The house was built in 1966 by local architect Arthur A. J. Marshman as a family home, on the site of the old tennis courts of Horton Hall. Featured include a cantilevered balcony and cedar roof shingles. The house was for a while owned and occupied by Roy Clarke, writer of Last of the Summer Wine.

The architectural expert Pevsner said of the house:

A striking house. The dominant features are the broad curving eaves of the shingled roofs and the taller circular service cores and chimney of local yellow stone. In plan the house is a comma, with a full stop linked by a bridge. The tail of the comma, open on the ground floor with bedrooms above, shelters a paved garden. The broad end has service rooms and entrances below and a circular living area above which has views in all directions.

In September 2012 English Heritage designated the house as Grade II listed. In the designation it was stated that "Along with Peter Lambert Gibbs's own house of 1965, Fernhill in Ashdown Forest, and Robert Harvey's houses in Warwickshire, Horton Rounds is one of the best in the country of a small group of post-war houses clearly influenced by the work of Frank Lloyd Wright".

== Notable residents of the village ==
- Roy Clarke, TV writer of Last of the Summer Wine for some years owned Horton Rounds
- Sir Robert Gunning - diplomat, died at Horton House, 22 September 1816
- Allan Lamb, England cricketer lived in the village in the 1970s.
- Arthur Marshman, architect and designer of Horton Rounds house
- Charles Montagu, Earl of Halifax – founder of the Bank of England
- Sir William Parr, uncle of Katherine Parr - 1st Baron Parr of Horton
- Thomas Wright (1711–1786), astronomer and architect. Wright was the first person to describe by its sobriquet, the Milky Way, the shape of our galaxy. He laid out the house's parklands and designed some of the buildings.

== Pictures from around the village ==
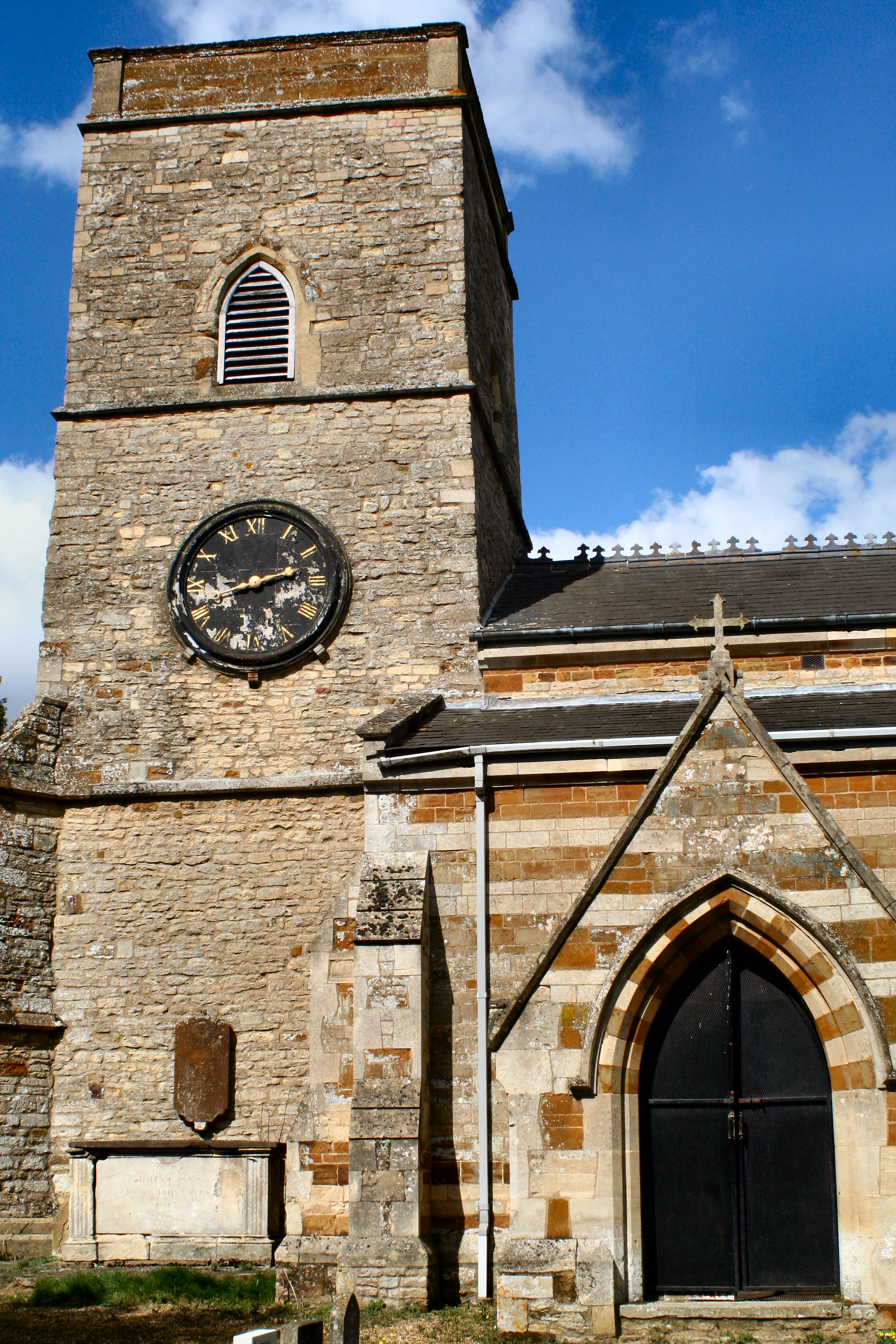
Horton Church of St. Mary Magdalene

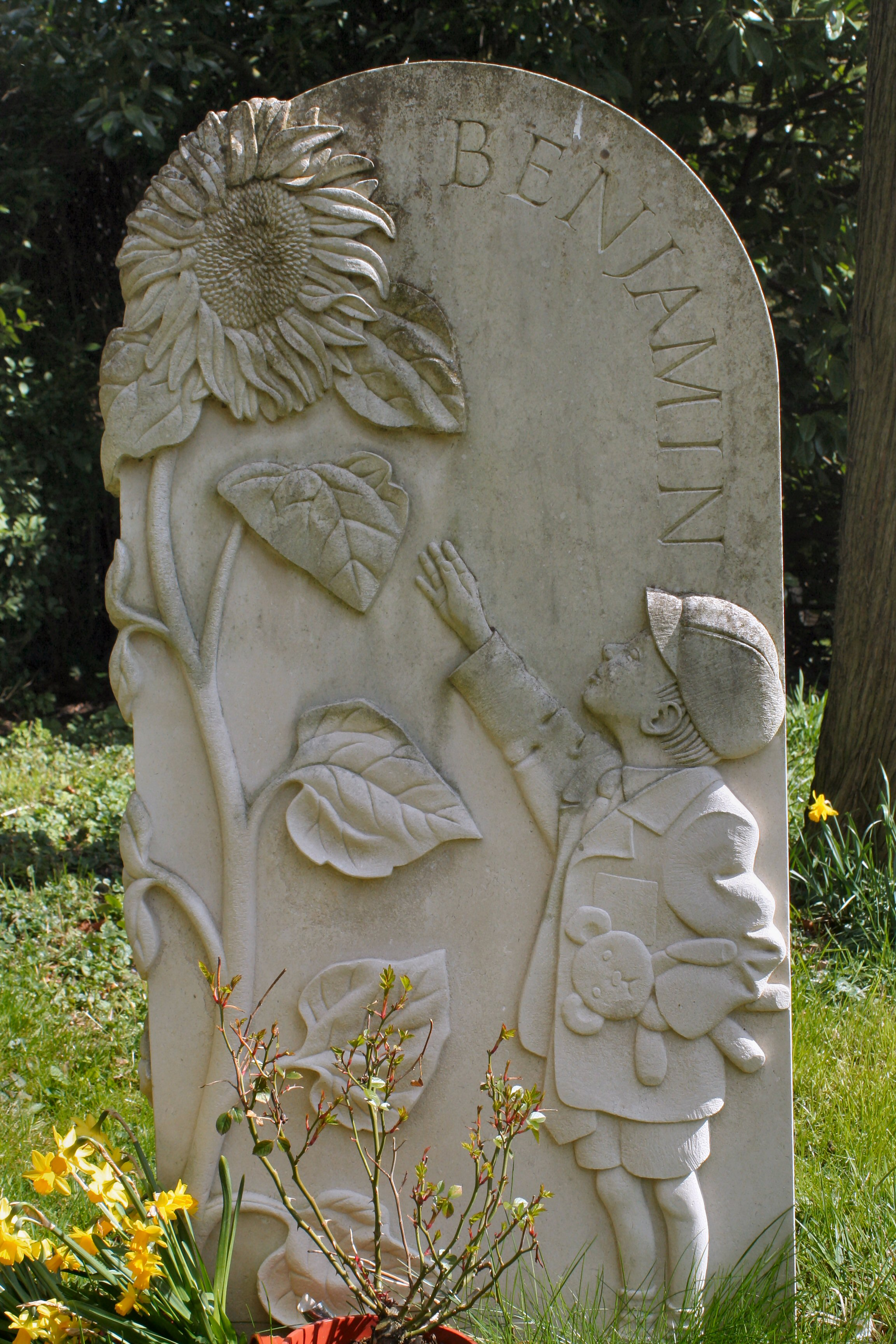
A touching gravestone from Horton Churchyard

== Horton: the surname ==
Hereditary surnames tended to arise in England after the Norman conquest and most of the earliest were derived from the place-names of family estates, whether in France or England. One such recorded is that of Richard de Horton from Northamptonshire, in 1255. See Horton (surname).
