= Village Hall (TV series) =

British TV drama series (1974–1975)

- Genre: Drama anthology
- Starring: Ron Moody; Bernard Hepton; George Cole; Colin Welland; Patrick Troughton; Richard Griffiths; Michael Angelis; John Le Mesurier; Anton Rodgers; Ian Hendry; Sue Nicholls; Joan Hickson; Marjie Lawrence; Sydney Tafler
- Country of origin: United Kingdom
- Original language: English
- No. of series: 2
- No. of episodes: 14

Production
- Running time: 50 minutes
- Production company: Granada Television

Original release
- Network: ITV
- Release: 16 July 1974 – 6 July 1975

Village Hall is a drama anthology series made by Granada Television between 1974 and 1975. It is entirely set in a village hall, with each episode highlighting a different use to which the space is put by local people. Writers include Jack Rosenthal and the actor Kenneth Cope.

== Episodes ==
Series	Episodes	Originally released	
Series	Episodes	First released	Last released
1	7	16 July 1974	13 September 1974
2	7	11 May 1975	6 July 1975

=== Series 1 (1974) ===
Produced by Michael Dunlop.

No. overall	No. in series	Title	Directed by	Written by	Original release date
1	1	"Mr. Ellis versus the People"	June Howson	Jack Rosenthal	16 July 1974
Cast: Ron Moody, Marjorie Yates, Brian Miller, Veronica Roberts, Bernard Hill, Madge Hindle, Michael Angelis, Richard Griffiths and Elizabeth Dawn.
2	2	"There'll Almost Always be an England"	Quentin Lawrence	Jack Rosenthal	30 July 1974
Cast: Bernard Hepton, Liz Smith, Reginald Barratt, Michael Melia, Norman Rossington, Keith Chegwin, Dilys Laye, Peter Pratt, David Swift, Stella Moray and Bruce Bould.
3	3	"Friendly Encounter"	Alan Grint	Willis Hall	6 August 1974
Cast: George Cole, Norman Jones, Tom Georgeson, Lewis Collins and Adrian Wright.
4	4	"Mark Massy Is Dead"	John Bruce	Peter Ransley	13 August 1974
Cast: Colin Welland, Priscilla Morgan, Thorley Walters and Gwen Taylor.
5	5	"Dancing In The Dark"	Alan Gibson	Peter Terson	20 August 1974
Cast: John Fraser, Mary Morris, Michael Latimer, Peter Straker, Dallas Adams and Lesley Manville.
6	6	"The Magic Sponge"	Colin Cant	Kenneth Cope	27 August 1974
Cast: Patrick Troughton, Richard Pearson, Sydney Tafler, Nicholas Smith and Marjie Lawrence.
7	7	"Distant Islands"	Alan Gibson	Donald Churchill & Julia Jones	13 September 1974
Cast: Pat Heywood, Richard Vernon, Edward Judd and Margery Mason.

=== Series 2 (1975) ===
Producer: Michael Dunlop.

No. overall	No. in series	Title	Directed by	Written by	Original release date
8	1	"Miss Health and Beauty"	Baz Taylor	Tim Aspinall	11 May 1975
Cast: Zoë Wanamaker, Sue Nicholls, Veronica Doran, Elizabeth Spriggs, Elaine Donnelly, Bernard Wrigley and Gerald Flood.
9	2	"Pie in the Sky"	Peter Plummer	Donald Churchill	18 May 1975
Cast: John Le Mesurier, Joan Hickson and Anton Rodgers.
10	3	"The Rough and the Smooth"	Alan Gibson	Peter Terson	8 June 1975
Cast: Trevor Adams, Christopher Guard, Jane Carr, Barry Stokes, Jan Francis, Kenneth Cranham and Linda Hayden.
11	4	"Lot 23"	Carol Wilks	Carey Harrison	15 June 1975
Cast: Paola Dionisotti, Kenneth Watson, Daphne Heard, Priscilla Morgan, Robert Oates, Patsy Smart, Spencer Banks, Jimmy Gardner, Sebastian Shaw and Gabrielle Daye.
12	5	"Old Scores"	Colin Cant	Kenneth Cope	22 June 1975
Cast: Roger Hammond, Heather Canning, Frank Mills, Geoffrey Chater, Christopher Benjamin, John Woodnutt and Daphne Slater.
13	6	"Silver Threads"	Brian Mills	Peter Whitbread	29 June 1975
Cast: Dinah Sheridan, Derek Francis, Arthur English, Sylvia Coleridge, Gwen Nelson. Denise Coffey, Arthur Hewlett, Leslie French, Erik Chitty, Valerie Lush, Stella Moray and Ben Aris.
14	7	"Battleground"	Quentin Lawrence	H. V. Kershaw	6 July 1975
Cast: Ian Hendry, Cyril Luckham, Basil Henson, Rosemarie Dunham, Joe Gladwin, Valerie Phillips, Michael Ripper, Frank Crompton, Richard Leech and John Nettleton.

== DVD release ==
The complete first and second series was released on DVD by Network in 2012
