= Norman Long (entertainer) =

- Signed photo
- Born: Norman Stuart Long; 26 March 1893; Deal, Kent, England
- Died: 10 January 1951 (aged 57); Torquay, Devon, England
- Occupations: Entertainer, singer, pianist
- Years active: 1919–c.1950

Norman Stuart Long (26 March 1893 – 10 January 1951) was an English singer, pianist and comic entertainer, who was one of the earliest stars of BBC Radio.

== Biography ==
Born in Deal, Kent, he moved to London as a child and worked as a clerk before joining Charles Heslop's Brownies concert party troupe. After serving in the military in the First World War, he made his first stage appearance at the Lewisham Hippodrome in 1919, billed as "A song, a smile, and a piano". He made his first radio appearance in November 1922, on the 2LO station set up by the newly established British Broadcasting Company. His billing was soon changed to "A song, a joke, and a piano" when it was realised that a smile could not be conveyed over radio, and he described himself as "Norman Long - all teeth and trousers".

With his "non-stop patter" as well as his skills as a singer and pianist, he remained a popular radio entertainer over the next 25 years. From 1925 he also made recordings of his own comic songs, mostly released on the Columbia label. These included such titles as "Back I Went to the Ministry of Labour", "Why Is the Bacon So Tough?", and "Never Have a Bath with Your Wristwatch On".

He took part in the first Royal Variety Performance to be broadcast, in 1927, and again in 1931. He also appeared in the 1932 film, The New Hotel. One of his recordings, "We Can't Let You Broadcast That", in 1932, made fun of the BBC's policy of banning certain words and phrases; the record itself was immediately banned, though this did not affect Long's career.

Long continued to make regular appearances on BBC radio variety shows through the Second World War. He gave a farewell performance in 1945, and retired to a hotel which he owned, the Bolt Head Hotel in Salcombe, Devon, but continued to put on performances and appear on radio.

He died from pneumonia, aged 57, in a nursing home in Torquay.
