= Bruce Bould =

English actor (1949–2023)

Bruce Robert Bould (19 May 1949 – 15 May 2023) was an English actor best known for playing David Harris-Jones in the television sitcom The Fall and Rise of Reginald Perrin from 1976 to 1979.

== Career ==
Bould was born in Bradford, West Riding of Yorkshire, to parents who were both actors, and began his acting career aged 17 at the Birmingham Repertory in a production of Crack in the Ice in September 1966. He joined the Royal Academy of Dramatic Art (RADA), as a student, graduating with a Diploma in acting in 1969.

Bould was best known for playing David Harris-Jones in the television sitcom The Fall and Rise of Reginald Perrin. His character was one of C.J.'s "yes" men, extremely shy, lacking in confidence and with low self-esteem. His catchphrase was a simple "Super!"

In 1972, he met and married actress Theresa Watson, who also appeared in The Fall and Rise of Reginald Perrin, playing David's wife Prue in two latter series.

Other television credits include Z-Cars, The Good Life, The New Avengers, To the Manor Born, Shelley, Howards' Way, Drop the Dead Donkey and As Time Goes By.

Bould was a regular on stage during the 1970s, in plays such as Clever Soldiers at the Hampstead Theatre Club in 1974, and A Family And A Fortune at the Theatre Royal, Bath in 1975, which starred Alec Guinness.

Bould died on 15 May 2023, aged 73.

== Filmography ==
=== Film ===
Year	Title	Role	Notes
1982	The Funny Side of Christmas	David Harris-Jones	TV film
1999	The Alchemists	Obstetrician	TV film
2010	Reg	Dad	Short

=== Television ===
Year	Title	Role	Notes
1969	BBC Play of the Month	Slaves, Citizens and Soldiers	Episode: "Julius Caesar"
1972	Z-Cars	Kenneth Fielding	Episode: "Witness"
1972	Thirty-Minute Theatre		Episode: "Bypass"
1973	Thirty-Minute Theatre	McNiece	Episode: "Swamp Music"
1973	Six Days of Justice	PC Pugh	Episode: "We'll Support You Evermore"
1973	Play for Today	Prisoner	Episode: "The Stretch"
1973	Van der Valk	Sitskoorn	Episode: "A Dangerous Point of View"
1974	Special Branch	Technician	Episode: "Sounds Sinister"
1974	New Scotland Yard	Roy	Episode: "Comeback"
1974	QB VII	O'Conner	Mini-series
1974	Village Hall	Colin Powell	Episode: "There'll Almost Always Be an England"
1975	Churchill's People	William Bradford	Episode: "America! America!"
1975	The Good Life	Guy	Episode: "The Guru of Surbiton"
1976	Hadleigh	Bob Whiteside	Episode: "Favours"
1976	The New Avengers	Froggart	Episode: "The Midas Touch"
1976-1979	The Fall and Rise of Reginald Perrin	David Harris-Jones	Series regular
1978	Rings on Their Fingers	The Honeymooner	Episode: "Vive la différence"
1979	The Dick Emery Show		1 episode
1980	Strangers	Detective Inspector Tom Casey	3 episodes
1981	Prisoners of Conscience	Man on Boat	Episode: "William Beausire"
1981	To the Manor Born	Dawkins	Episode: "Station Closing"
1983	The Consultant	Ronald Gates	Episode: "Extension of Credit"
1983	Now and Then	Prendrythe	1 episode
1983	Shelley	Malcolm	2 episodes
1984	The Hello Goodbye Man	Doctor	1 episode
1984	Shine on Harvey Moon	Tom Chavan	3 episodes
1985-1987	Howards' Way	David Lloyd	Series regular
1987	Me and My Girl	Roger	Episode: "Lost and Found"
1990	Close to Home	Mr. Hinkley	Episode: "Motor Madness"
1992	Harry Enfield's Television Programme	Teacher	1 episode
1992	The Upper Hand	Robert	Episode: "You Shall Go to the Ball"
1993	Drop the Dead Donkey	Simpson	Episode: "Henry's Lost Love"
1995	As Time Goes By	Hotel Manager	Episode: "The Anniversary Party"
1996	The Legacy of Reginald Perrin	David Harris-Jones	Series regular
