= Pauline Yates =

British actress (1929–2015)

- Born: Pauline Lettice Yates; 16 June 1929; St Helens, Lancashire, England
- Died: 21 January 2015 (aged 85); Northwood, London, England
- Occupation: Actress
- Years active: 1957–2002
- Spouse: Donald Churchill (m. 1960; died 1991)
- Children: 2, including Jemma

Pauline Lettice Yates (16 June 1929 – 21 January 2015) was an English actress, best known for playing Elizabeth Perrin in the BBC television sitcom The Fall and Rise of Reginald Perrin. She also starred in Bachelor Father and Keep It in the Family.

== Early life and career ==
Yates was born in St Helens, Lancashire, on 16 June 1929. She began her acting career by joining Oldham Rep straight after leaving Childwall Valley High School for Girls. At the age of 17 she made her stage debut in a dramatised version of Jane Eyre, playing Grace Poole.

In 1957 Yates was cast in the role of Estelle Waterman on Emergency Ward 10, after which she became a regular face on British television and also appeared in a few British films. In the 1960s she made guest appearances on Armchair Theatre, Dixon of Dock Green, Z-Cars, Gideon's Way, Nightingale's Boys, The Human Jungle and The Ronnie Barker Playhouse, "Maigret", among others. (She appeared again with Ronnie Barker in Lines From My Grandfather's Forehead, a comedy sketch show for radio, which was first broadcast on BBC Radio 4 from 15 February 1971.) In 1970 she appeared as Mme Arnoux in Sentimental Education with Robert Powell.

In 1972 she starred in her own series, Harriet's Back in Town, produced by Thames Television. The cast included William Russell and Sally Bazely. In 1975, she co-starred with Derek Nimmo in the short-lived sitcom My Honourable Mrs, in which she played Jane Prendergast, a housewife who becomes a Conservative MP like her husband Derek Prendergast (Derek Nimmo). Yates was later cast as Elizabeth Perrin in The Fall and Rise of Reginald Perrin (1976–79), and its follow-up The Legacy of Reginald Perrin (1996).

== Later life and career ==
Yates's ability as a comedy foil was further utilised in the ITV sitcom Keep It in the Family (Thames, 1980–82) where she played wife to the frustratingly eccentric comic-strip artist Dudley Rush (played by Robert Gillespie) that sustained five series; Yates did not feature in the 1983 series.

She appeared onstage in an Oxford Playhouse Company production of the Joe Orton play, What the Butler Saw at Theatr y Werin in Aberystwyth, Wales, with William Russell and Michael Barrington in the cast. In 1987 she played the lead in Alan Ayckbourn's play Woman in Mind for the same company. Yates acted in David Pownall's Leicester Haymarket stage adaptation of Jane Austen's novel, Pride and Prejudice, directed by Bill Pryde in 1985. In 1989 Yates appeared in the play, Talking to Angels at the Theatre Museum in London.

== Personal life ==
Yates married actor/writer Donald Churchill in 1960. The couple had two daughters, Jemma and Polly, and lived for many years in Primrose Hill, North London. Donald Churchill died on set in 1991 after filming his final episode of El C.I.D. for Granada Television in which he played the irascible harbour master Metcalf. Jemma Churchill is also an actress. Polly Churchill (died 2018) was a writer. Yates had three grandchildren.

== Death ==
Pauline Yates died in London, on 21 January 2015, aged 85.

== Filmography ==
Year	Title	Role	Notes
1959	Fly Away Peter	Phyllis Hapgood	TV movie
1960	Identity Unknown	Jenny	
1964	Never Mention Murder	Zita	Edgar Wallace Mysteries
1965	Darling	Estelle Gold	
1967	The Spare Tyres	Doreen	Short
1968	Lionheart	Mother	
1975	Savages	Margaret West	TV movie
1978	The Four Feathers	Army Nurse	TV movie
1981	Jack's Trade	Val	TV movie
1982	The Funny Side of Christmas	Elizabeth Perrin	TV movie
1985	She'll Be Wearing Pink Pyjamas	Diane	
1992	Elenya	Elenya's Voice	Voice
1998	Reckless The Sequel	Joyce Crane	TV movie
