= The New Hotel =

1932 film

- Directed by: Bernard Mainwaring
- Written by: Bernard Mainwaring
- Produced by: Bernard Mainwaring
- Starring: Norman Long; Dan Young; Hal Gordon
- Cinematography: Desmond Dickinson
- Music by: Marc Anthony
- Production company: Stoll Pictures
- Distributed by: Producers Distributing Corporation
- Release date: 4 July 1932
- Running time: 49 minutes
- Country: United Kingdom
- Language: English

The New Hotel is a 1932 British musical film directed by Bernard Mainwaring and starring Norman Long, Dan Young and Hal Gordon. It was made at Cricklewood Studios.

== Cast ==
- Norman Long
- Dan Young
- Hal Gordon
- Mickey Brantford as The Newlywed
- Adele Blanche
- Alfred Wellesley as Maitre d'Hotel
- Basil Howes
- Betty Norton
- Hamilton Keene
- Ruth Taylor
- Al Davidson
- Frank Adey
- Myno Burney
- James Croome
- Noel Dainton
- Gilly Flower
- Lindy Jeune
- Kinsley Lark
- Percy Val
- Bert Weston

== Bibliography ==
- Low, Rachael. Filmmaking in 1930s Britain. George Allen & Unwin, 1985.
- Wood, Linda. British Films, 1927-1939. British Film Institute, 1986.
