= Douglas Argent =

British TV producer and director (1921–2010)

Douglas George Charles Argent
- Born: 21 May 1921; Bexleyheath, Kent, England
- Died: 30 October 2010 (aged 89)
- Occupation(s): Television producer, director
- Years active: 1950s–1991
- Known for: Producer of The Liver Birds, Steptoe and Son, Fawlty Towers

Douglas George Charles Argent (21 May 1921 – 30 October 2010) was an English television producer and director.

Born in Bexleyheath, Kent and raised in Ilford, Essex, Argent's parents ran an ironmongers shop. He served as a navigator during World War II with 84 Squadron, but his plane was shot down and he was held as a Japanese prisoner-of-war at Osaka's POW Camp #4 Ikuno.

Following a career as an actor, he had a small role in The Colditz Story (1955) and The Battle of the River Plate (1956), Argent became a floor manager, the assistant director with the BBC later gravitating to work as a director and producer. In this role he supervised early episodes of Till Death Us Do Part (1965).

During the next decade, he was the producer of The Liver Birds during the period 1972 to 1976 and the final series of Steptoe and Son (1974). His last work for the BBC before his official retirement from the corporation was the second series of Fawlty Towers (1979). Subsequently, he freelanced, working for ITV and Channel 4. His last work was directing episodes of EastEnders in 1991.

== Filmography ==
| Year | Title | Role | Notes |
|---|---|---|---|
| 1955 | The Colditz Story | British Officer #1 | |
| 1956 | Women Without Men | 3rd Reveller | Uncredited |
| 1956 | The Battle of the River Plate | Sub. Lieutenant, HMS Ajax | Uncredited |
