= List of The Fall and Rise of Reginald Perrin episodes =

This is a list of episodes of The Fall and Rise of Reginald Perrin and its follow-up series The Legacy of Reginald Perrin.

== Series overview ==
Series	Episodes	Originally released		
Series	Episodes	First released	Last released	Network
1	7	8 September 1976	20 October 1976	BBC One
2	7	21 September 1977	2 November 1977	BBC One
3	7	29 November 1978	24 January 1979	BBC One
Christmas		27 December 1982		BBC One
Legacy	7	22 September 1996	31 October 1996	BBC One

== Episodes ==
=== Series 1 (1976) ===
No.	Title	Original release date	Prod. code
1	"Episode One"	8 September 1976	101
Reggie's life as a sales executive at Sunshine Desserts is getting too much for him and the strain is starting to show.
2	"Episode Two"	15 September 1976	102
Reggie's plans for a relaxing weekend are scuppered when the family decides to visit a safari park.
3	"Episode Three"	22 September 1976	103
Elizabeth is away, so Reggie decides to invite his secretary Joan over for a secret tryst... but constant visits from family and friends prevent this.
4	"Episode Four"	29 September 1976	104
With Elizabeth still away, Reggie hosts a dinner party (without any food) for his business associates.
5	"Episode Five"	6 October 1976	105
After a disastrous public speech to the Fruit Association at Bilberry Hall, Reggie decides to take drastic action...
6	"Episode Six"	13 October 1976	106
After his fake suicide, Reggie tries out a number of different new identities.
7	"Episode Seven"	20 October 1976	107
Reggie returns as Martin Wellbourne, attends his own memorial service, and wins back Elizabeth.

=== Series 2 (1977) ===
No.	Title	Original release date	Prod. code
8	"Episode One"	21 September 1977	201
Reggie reveals his true identity and C.J. promptly fires him.
9	"Episode Two"	28 September 1977	202
Reggie is reduced to working at Mr. Pelham's pig farm and Elizabeth decides to get a job.
10	"Episode Three"	5 October 1977	203
Reggie has an idea for making a fortune: a shop that sells total rubbish. It will be called "Grot."
11	"Episode Four"	12 October 1977	204
Grot is a huge success selling all sorts of useless products.
12	"Episode Five"	19 October 1977	205
Sunshine Desserts goes bankrupt and Reggie hires his old coworkers and boss to Grot.
13	"Episode Six"	26 October 1977	206
Reggie is bored with his success and plans to destroy Grot by hiring totally unsuitable people.
14	"Episode Seven"	2 November 1977	207
Reggie's plan fails. He tries more extreme tactics which also fail. Only one more thing left to do...

=== Series 3 (1978–79) ===
No.	Title	Original release date	Prod. code
15	"Episode One"	29 November 1978	301
Reggie decides to open a commune helping people to live in peace and harmony. But first he needs staff...
16	"Episode Two"	6 December 1978	302
Having recruited all the old faces, Reggie welcomes his one and only guest to "Perrin's".
17	"Episode Three"	27 December 1978	303
After a unique advertising campaign, "Perrin's" gains another guest.
18	"Episode Four"	3 January 1979	304
Business is booming and Reggie is content... but for how long?
19	"Episode Five"	10 January 1979	305
Money and jewellery begin to disappear at Perrin's and a female guest starts to be suggestive with the male staff.
20	"Episode Six"	17 January 1979	306
Perrin's loses face in the community as McBlane attacks a Salvation Army woman and there is a backlash against his "Peacekeeping Force".
21	"Episode Seven"	24 January 1979	307
Perrin's closes and everyone says their goodbyes. Reggie gets a new job but finds himself again working for C.J. and his brother F.J. Is the coast calling again?

=== Christmas sketch (1982) ===
No.	Title	Original release date	Prod. code
Special	"The Funny Side of Christmas: Reggie Perrin"	27 December 1982	Special
Reggie and Elizabeth's quiet Christmas morning is interrupted by family, friends, coworkers, and even a tramp. This was a 5 minute sketch broadcast as part of The Funny Side of Christmas

=== The Legacy of Reginald Perrin (1996) ===
No.	Title	Original release date	Prod. code
22	"Episode One"	22 September 1996	101
Reggie has died, killed by a billboard advertising the life insurance company with which he was insured. He has left £1m to each of his friends and family – on one condition.
23	"Episode Two"	29 September 1996	102
To net a share of Reggie's fortune, all beneficiaries must prove to have done something absurd. Individual attempts fail, so they decide to work collectively.
24	"Episode Three"	6 October 1996	103
The team form BROSCOR – the Bloodless Revolution of Senior Citizens and the Occupationally Rejected, with the aim of marching on London.
25	"Episode Four"	13 October 1996	104
Both Doc and C.J. have affections for the solicitor and executor of Reggie's will, while the project has brought divorced Tom and Linda back together.
26	"Episode Five"	20 October 1996	105
The team concentrates on recruiting their army for the demonstrations, but C.J. has had enough and decides to talk to the press.
27	"Episode Six"	27 October 1996	106
Tom and Linda remarry, and Joan marries her boyfriend Hank. David Harris-Jones gets drunk at the reception and tells a BBC employee about the project.
28	"Episode Seven"	31 October 1996	107
It is the day of the revolution. Coaches are hijacked, the recruits descend on London and Jimmy interrupts the evening news. But the police have been tipped off.
