= Nightingale's Boys =

- Starring: Derek Farr
- Country of origin: United Kingdom
- No. of series: 1
- No. of episodes: 7

Production
- Running time: 50 minutes

Original release
- Network: Granada
- Release: 14 January – 25 February 1975

Nightingale's Boys is a drama series of seven plays about the reunion of a group of friends from school, brought together after twenty-five years by their form teacher, Mr. Nightingale.

== Cast ==
- Derek Farr - Mr Nightingale
- Pauline Yates - Margaret
- Terry Gilligan - Nick Selby
- Michael Hawkins - Hal Crowther

== Plot ==
A group of middle-aged men from Northern England who were each in the same class in 1949 are brought back together by their form teacher, Bill Nightingale, and find that each of them is at a turning points in his life.

== Episodes ==
No.	Title	Directed by	Written by	Original release date
1	"Tweety"	Richard Everitt	Arthur Hopcraft	14 January 1975
2	"Izzy"	Richard Everitt	C. P. Taylor	21 January 1975
3	"Big Sid"	Les Chatfield	Jack Rosenthal	28 January 1975
4	"Flossie"	Richard Everitt	Colin Spencer	4 February 1975
5	"Spivvy"	Peter Plummer	John Finch	11 February 1975
6	"A.J."	Roger Tucker	Alexander Baron	18 February 1975
7	"Decision"	June Howson	Arthur Hopcraft	25 February 1975

== DVD release ==
Network DVD released the complete series on DVD in 2012.
