= The Funny Side of Christmas =

- Written by: Roy Clarke; Ian Davidson; David Dixon; Antony Jay; Carla Lane; Jonathan Lynn; Chris Miller; Helen Murry; David Nobbs; Mike Radford; Terry Ravenscroft; Griff Rhys Jones; Jamie Rix; Bob Sinfield; Mel Smith; John Sullivan; Peter Vincent; Nick Wilton
- Directed by: Robin Nash (presentation segments)
- Presented by: Frank Muir
- Country of origin: United Kingdom
- Original language: English

Production
- Producer: Robin Nash
- Running time: 80 minutes

Original release
- Network: BBC1
- Release: 27 December 1982

Related
- See text

The Funny Side of Christmas is a Christmas special broadcast by BBC1 on 27 December 1982. Presented by Frank Muir, it comprised one comedy sketch each from 10 contemporaneous BBC comedy series: Butterflies, The Fall and Rise of Reginald Perrin, Last of the Summer Wine, The Les Dawson Show, Only Fools and Horses, Open All Hours, Smith and Jones, Sorry!, Three of a Kind, and Yes Minister.

== Comedy sketches ==
The sketches below are listed in the order in which they appear in the programme.

=== The Fall and Rise of Reginald Perrin ===
It's Christmas Day, and no sooner than Reggie has settled in to relax with his wife Elizabeth, they are inundated by entreating houseguests.

Written by David Nobbs.

Cast: Leonard Rossiter as Reggie Perrin, Pauline Yates as Elizabeth Perrin, Sue Nicholls as Joan Greengross, John Barron as CJ, Trevor Adams as Tony Webster, Bruce Bould as David Harris-Jones, John Horsley as Doc Morrissey, Geoffrey Palmer as Jimmy Anderson, and Michael Ripper as the tramp.

=== The Les Dawson Show ===
Cast: Les Dawson and Roy Barraclough as Cissie and Ada.

Directed by Ernest Maxin; produced by Robin Nash.

=== Yes Minister ===
Humphrey wishes the Minister a happy Christmas in civil servant style.

Written by Jonathan Lynn and Antony Jay; directed by Sydney Lotterby.

Cast: Nigel Hawthorne as Sir Humphrey Appleby, Paul Eddington as Jim Hacker, and Derek Fowlds as Bernard Woolley

=== Only Fools and Horses ===
Del Boy hawks his wares to passers-by in the "Christmas Trees" sketch.

"Christmas Trees" is the title of this vignette, in which Del Boy is determined to sell 149 telescopic Christmas trees. Maybe an endorsement from the Church of England would help?

"Christmas Trees" was written by John Sullivan, and directed and produced by Ray Butt.

Cast: David Jason as Derek Trotter, Nicholas Lyndhurst as Rodney Trotter, Lennard Pearce as Grandad Trotter, John Pennington as the vicar, and Roy Heather as Sid

=== Three of a Kind ===
Cast: Tracey Ullman, Lenny Henry, and David Copperfield

=== Last of the Summer Wine ===
Norman, Foggy, and Compo get together on Christmas Day, but Norman is determined to keep Christmas at bay.

Written by Roy Clarke; directed by Alan J. W. Bell.

Cast: Peter Sallis as Norman Clegg, Brian Wilde as Foggy, and Bill Owen as Compo

=== Sorry! ===
Written by Ian Davidson and Peter Vincent; directed by David Askey.

Cast: Ronnie Corbett as Timothy, Barbara Lott as Mother, and William Moore as Father

=== Butterflies ===
Christmas dinner is over, and Ria's sons are about to leave for a party. A desperate Leonard has been gazing at their house from his car. Later, he phones the house just as Ria and her husband Ben are kissing under the mistletoe.

Written by Carla Lane.

Cast: Wendy Craig as Ria, Geoffrey Palmer as Ben, Andrew Hall as Russell, Nicholas Lyndhurst as Adam, Bruce Montague as Leonard, and as Michael Ripper as Thomas

=== Smith and Jones ===
Smith is being forced to spend Christmas in hospital. Jones arrives, supposedly to cheer him up but actually to taunt and annoy him.

Written by Griff Rhys Jones and Mel Smith; directed by Martin Shardlow.

Cast: Mel Smith as Mr Mather, and Griff Rhys Jones as Trevor

=== Open All Hours ===
It is Christmas morning, and we learn that Granville and Arkwright are invited to Nurse Gladys' flat for dinner. Granville is looking forward to it, but Arkwright's anticipation is tempered by the knowledge that Gladys' mother will be there.

Written by Roy Clarke.

Cast: Ronnie Barker as Arkwright, David Jason as Granville, and Lynda Baron as Nurse Gladys Emmanuel

== DVD release ==
While the film has not been released as a stand alone film on DVD, a few of the comedy sketches have been released as bonus features on a few DVDs. The comedy sketch of The Fall and Rise of Reginald Perrin is included on a Region 2 DVD release of The Fall and Rise of Reginald Perrin: Complete Box Set. The comedy sketch of Last of the Summer Wine is included on the Region 1 DVD release of Last of the Summer Wine - Vintage 1995.

== See also ==
- Christmas Night with the Stars
- List of Christmas television specials
