= Arthur A. J. Marshman =

English architect (1929–1997)

Arthur Marshman
- Born: 19 February 1929; Northampton, England
- Died: 15 July 1997 (aged 68); Northampton, England
- Occupation: Architect
- Known for: Horton Rounds

Arthur Albert John Marshman FRIBA FRSA (19 February 1929 – 15 July 1997) was an English architect. He was a Fellow of both the Royal Institute of British Architects and the Royal Society of Arts.

Marshman was born in Northampton, the only son of Arthur (a sub-postmaster) and Evelyn Marshman (née Smith), both of Northampton. He was educated at Northampton Grammar School. He married twice and had four children. Marshman was founder of Marshman Warren Taylor architects. He died in Northampton.

Before beginning his professional life he completed his National Service in the Royal Air Force.

== Practice ==
According to English Heritage:

A A J Marshman was a senior partner in Marshman, Warren and Taylor, a substantial regional practice specialising in commercial buildings, who built extensively outside London. They are best known for their work in Devon and Cornwall, which included the Chapter House at Truro Cathedral (1974) as well as large offices and housing association schemes.

Marshman also designed the sympathetic and award-winning vestry extension to the Church at Weston Favell, Northampton, which was described by Pevsner as "Excellent".

== Horton Rounds: the house on a circle ==
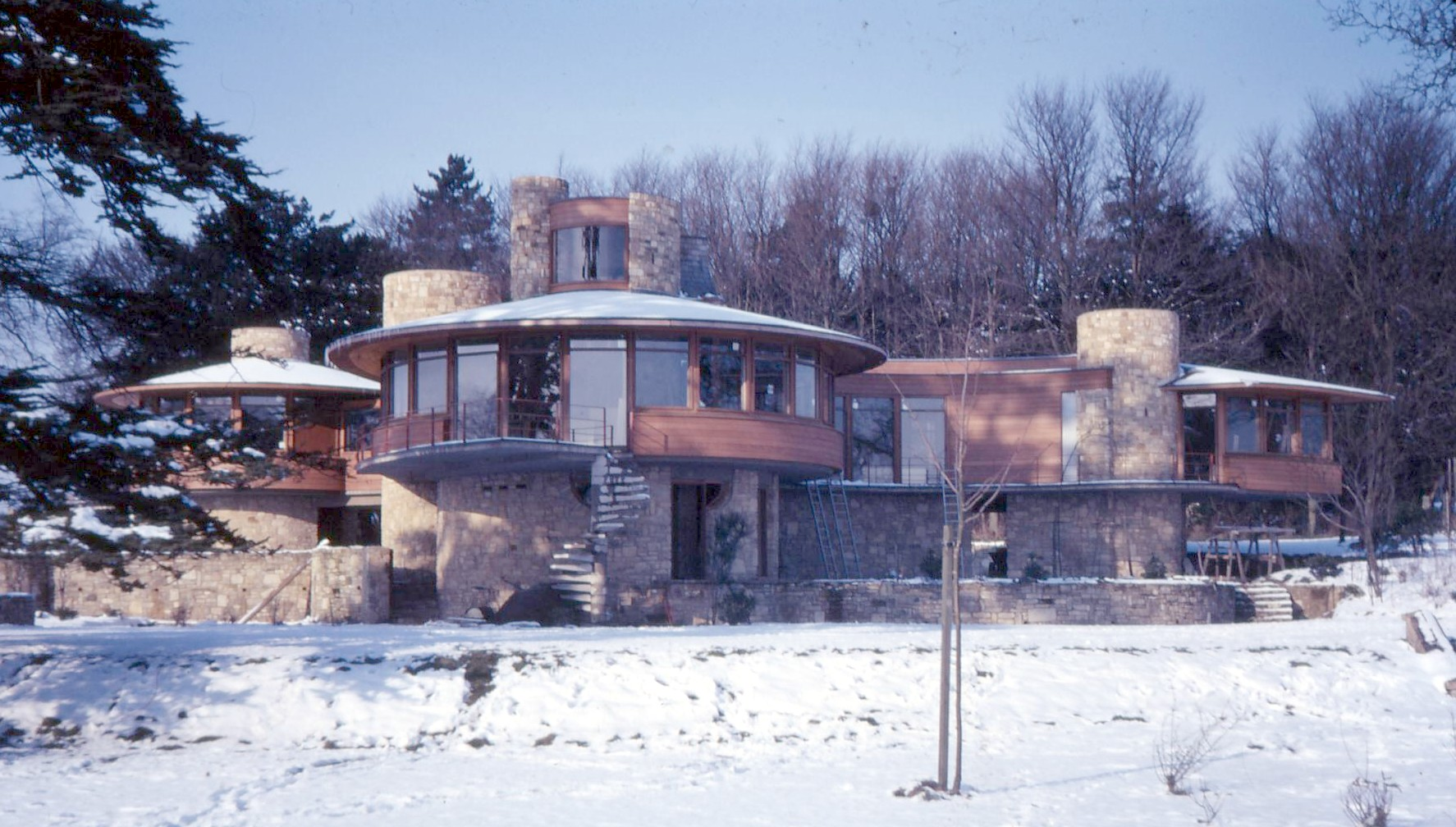
Horton Rounds – the house on a circle

He is probably best known for the design of Horton Rounds, an unusual curved house on stilts incorporating the shapes of a comma and a full stop in the village of Horton, Northamptonshire. The house was built as a family home, and the family lived there until 1982.

The house has an unusual cantilevered balcony and cedar roof shingles. After being sold by the family, the house was for some years under the ownership of Roy Clarke the writer of Last of the Summer Wine.

Of the house, Pevsner says:

"A striking house. The dominant features are the broad curving eaves of the shingled roofs and the taller circular service cores and chimney of local yellow stone. In plan the house is a comma, with a full stop linked by a bridge. The tail of the comma, open on the ground floor with bedrooms above, shelters a paved garden. The broad end has service rooms and entrances below and a circular living area above which has views in all directions".

In August 2012 English Heritage designated the house as Grade II listed. In the designation it was stated that "Along with Peter Lambert Gibbs's own house of 1965, Fernhill in Ashdown Forest, and Robert Harvey's houses in Warwickshire, Horton Rounds is one of the best in the country of a small group of post-war houses clearly influenced by the work of Frank Lloyd Wright."

== Examples of Marshman's work ==
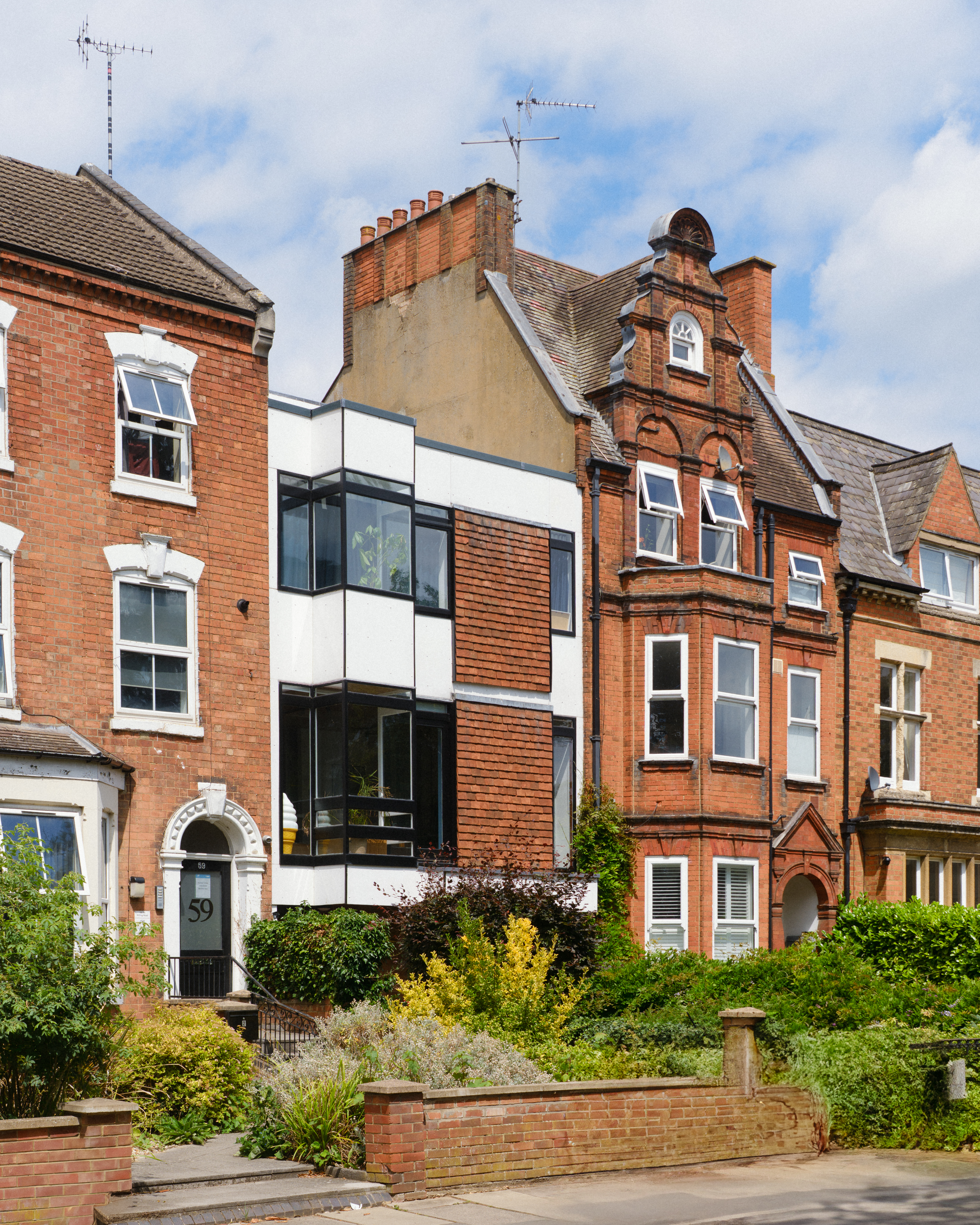
60 billing Road, Northampton

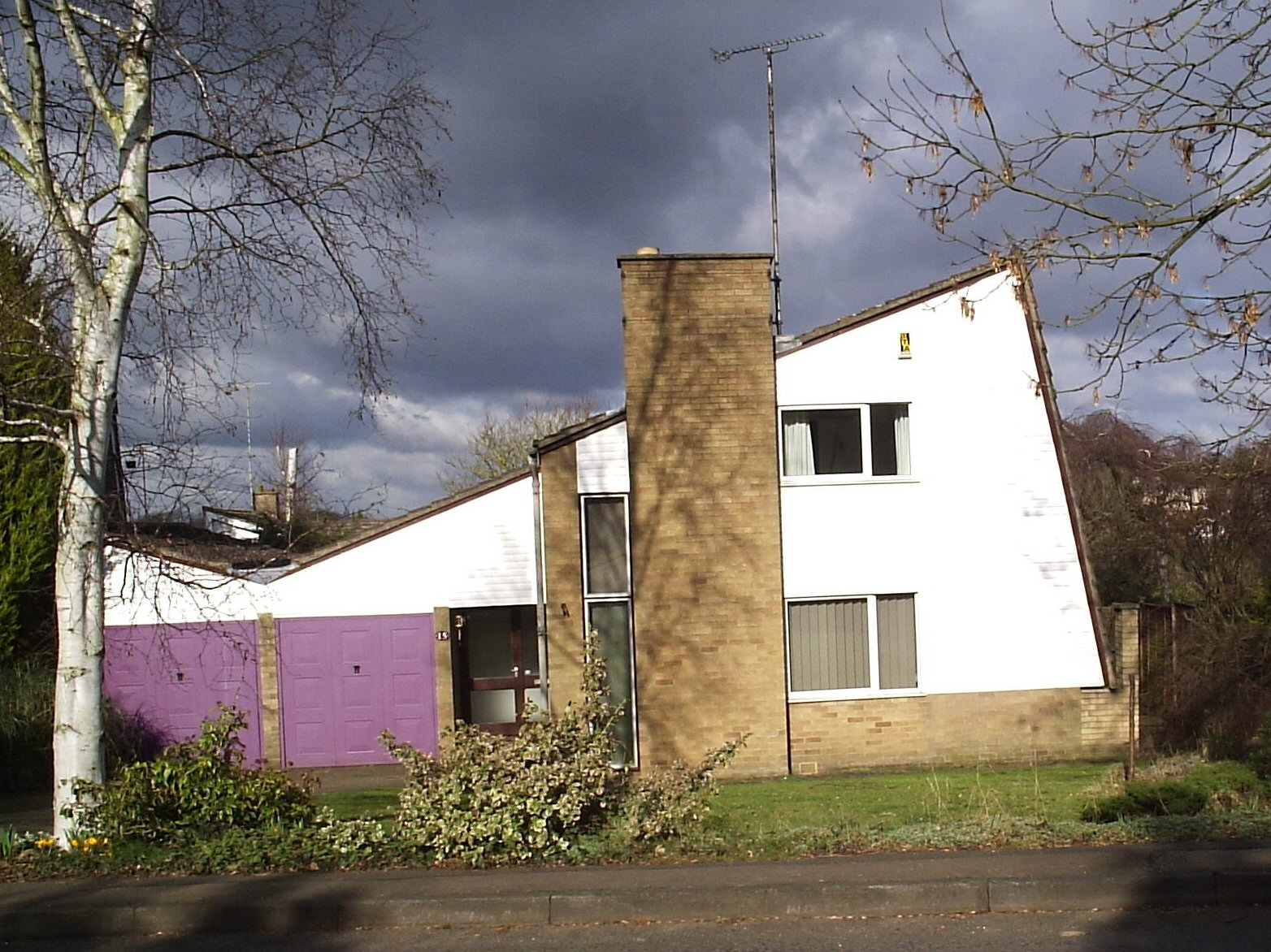
"Cheese house", Horton, Northamptonshire

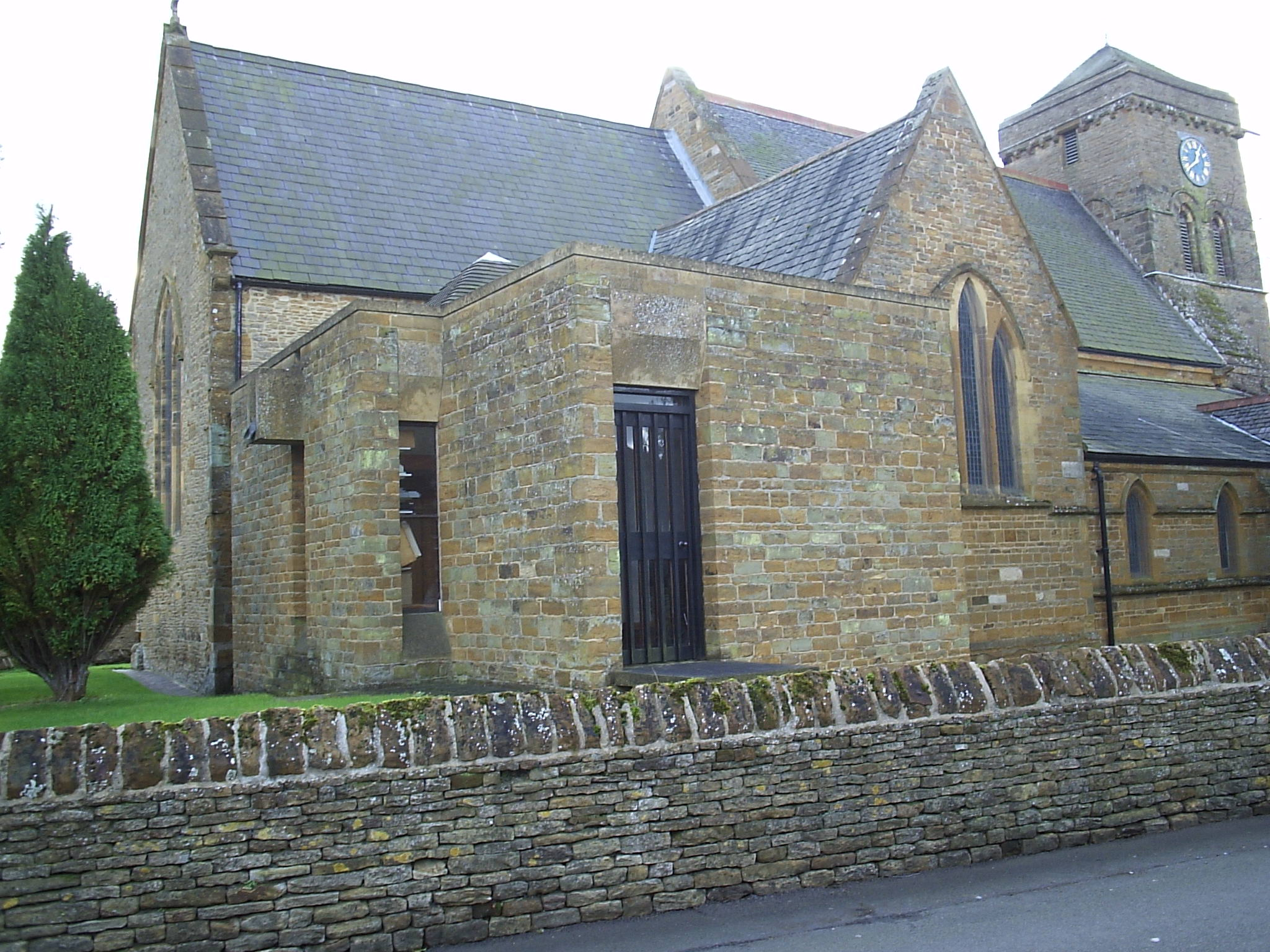
St Peter's vestry – Weston Favell

== The Marshman family ==
The Marshman family originated in Wiltshire and moved to Northamptonshire in the 18th century. Other members of the Marshman family include:

- Hannah Marshman
- John Clark Marshman
- Joshua Marshman

== External sources ==
- English Heritage Listing
