= Terence Alexander =

English actor (1923–2009)

- Born: Terence Joseph Alexander; 11 March 1923; Islington, London, England
- Died: 28 May 2009 (aged 86); London, England
- Other name: Terry Alexander
- Occupation: Actor
- Years active: 1947–1999
- Spouses: Juno Stevas (m. 1949; div. 1972) Jane Downs (m. 1976)

Terence Joseph Alexander (11 March 1923 – 28 May 2009) was an English film and television actor, best known for his role as Charlie Hungerford in the British TV drama Bergerac, the original iteration of which ran for nine series on BBC1 from 1981 to 1991.

== Early life and career ==
Alexander was born in London, the son of a doctor, and grew up in Yorkshire. He was educated at Ratcliffe College, Leicestershire, and Norwood College, Harrogate, and started acting in the theatre at the age of 16. During the Second World War he served in the British Army as a lieutenant with the 27th Lancers, and was seriously wounded when his armoured car was hit by artillery fire in Italy.

In 1956, Alexander appeared on stage in Ring For Catty at the Lyric Theatre in London. He is probably best remembered as Charlie Hungerford from the detective series Bergerac, though he was also very prominent in the 1967 BBC adaptation of The Forsyte Saga. One of his early roles was in the children's series Garry Halliday. In 1970, he appeared in an episode of Please, Sir! in 1970 as the headmaster of a rival school, and as Lord Uxbridge in Sergei Bondarchuk's war epic Waterloo.

Alexander appeared in many other film and television roles, including three appearances in different roles in The Champions, The Avengers, The Persuaders! (in 'Powerswitch'),, Moody and Pegg (in 'He-the Go-Between'), Terry and June (1979–1980), Behind the Screen (1981–1982), the 1985 Doctor Who serial The Mark of the Rani, and The New Statesman (1987). On radio he starred as The Toff in the BBC radio adaptation of the John Creasey novels. He appeared in all but two episodes of Bergerac from 1981 to 1991. He also played Commander Duffield in the 1985 pilot episode of Dempsey and Makepeace, Armed and Extremely Dangerous.

Alexander appeared on the West End in comedies and farces, and his credits included Move Over, Mrs Markham (1971), Two and Two Make Sex (1973), There Goes The Bride (1974–75) and Fringe Benefits (1976).

== Personal life ==
By the time of Bergerac Alexander was blind in one eye due to a condition of the retina, which seriously threatened his sight in the other eye. He retired from acting in 1999, suffering from Parkinson's disease. He lived in Fulham, London, with his second wife, the actress Jane Downs. He died on 28 May 2009 aged 86.

== Filmography ==
=== Film ===
- Comin' Thro the Rye (1947) as Robert Burns (film debut)
- The Woman with No Name (1950) as 2nd Sapper Officer
- The Elusive Pimpernel (1950) as Duke of Dorset
- A Tale of Five Cities (1951)
- Death Is a Number (1951) as Alan Robert
- The Gentle Gunman (1952) as Ship's Officer (uncredited)
- Top Secret (1952) as second M.V.D.
- Glad Tidings (1953) as First Lieutenant Spud Cusack
- Park Plaza 605 (1953) as Hotel Manager
- The Runaway Bus (1954) as Peter Jones
- Dangerous Cargo (1954) as Harry Fraser
- The Green Scarf (1954) as Wireless Operator
- Hands of Destiny (1954) as Ranald's Office Manager
- Out of the Clouds (1955) as Bob Robins – Duty Room Radio Operator (uncredited)
- Portrait of Alison (1955) as Fenby
- Who Done It? (1956) as Radio Show Official (uncredited)
- The Green Man (1956) as Radio Announcer (uncredited)
- The Eternal Question (1956)
- The One That Got Away (1957) as R.A.F. Intelligence Officer
- The Square Peg (1958) as Captain Wharton
- The Doctor's Dilemma (1958) as Mr. Lanchester
- Danger Within (1959) as Lt. Gibbs
- Breakout (1959) as Farrow
- Don't Panic Chaps! (1959) as Lieutenant Babbington
- The Price of Silence (1960) as John Braine
- The League of Gentlemen (1960) as Rupert
- The Bulldog Breed (1960) as Defending Counsel
- Edgar Wallace Mysteries, (Man at the Carlton Tower) (1961) as Johnny Time
- Carry On Regardless (1961) as Trevor Trelawney
- The Gentle Terror (1961) as David
- The Fast Lady (1962) as Policeman on Motorcycle
- On the Beat (1962) as Chief Supt. Bert Belcher
- She Always Gets Their Man (1962) as Bob Conley
- The Mind Benders (1963) as Rowing Coach (uncredited)
- The V.I.P.s (1963) as Captain
- Bitter Harvest (1963) as Andy
- The Intelligence Men (1965) as Reed
- Judith (1966) as Carstairs
- The Long Duel (1967) as Major
- The Spare Tyres (1967) as Dennis Colville
- Only When I Larf (1968) as Gee Gee Gray
- What's Good for the Goose (1969) as Frisby
- Run a Crooked Mile (1969) as Peter Martin
- The Magic Christian (1969) as Mad Major
- Waterloo (1970) as Lord Uxbridge
- All the Way Up (1970) as Bob Chickman
- The Vault of Horror (1973) as Breedley (Segment 5 "Drawn and Quartered")
- The Day of the Jackal (1973) as Lloyd
- Claudine (1974) as Teddy (uncredited)
- The Internecine Project (1974) as Business Tycoon
- The Seven Dials Mystery (1981) as George Lomax
- That Englishwoman: An Account of the Life of Emily Hobhouse (1989) as Rev. Reginald Hobhouse (final film)

=== Television ===
- The New Adventures of Charlie Chan (1958) as Gerald Torrance
- Solo for Canary (1958) as Flash
- Garry Halliday (1959–61) as Bill Dodds (co pilot)
- Maigret
- 24-Hour Call (1963) as Nigel Norton
- The Avengers (1965–1969) as 'Piggy' Warren/Ponsonby/Bromfield
- The Forsyte Saga (1967) as Montague Dartie
- The Champions (1968) as Douglas Trennick
- Ben Travers' Farces (1970) as Various roles
- Bless This House (1971) as Dr. Ian McLaren
- Lord Peter Wimsey (TV series) (The Unpleasantness at the Bellona Club, episode) (1973) as Robert Fentiman
- The Pallisers (1974) as Lord George
- Jennie: Lady Randolph Churchill (1974) as Henry Ainley
- Ike (1979) as Gen. Arthur Tedder
- Churchill and the Generals (1979) as Gen. Sir Harold Alexander
- Bergerac (1981–1991) as Charlie Hungerford
- Frankenstein (1984) as Alphonse Frankenstein
- Strangers and Brothers (1984) as R.S.Robinson
- Doctor Who (1985) as Lord Ravensworth
- The New Statesman (1989–1992) as Sir Greville Macdonald
- Casualty (1999) as Laurence Wilkinson (final appearance)
