= To Catch a King =

- Genre: Thriller; Drama
- Screenplay by: Roger O. Hirson
- Story by: Harry Patterson
- Directed by: Clive Donner
- Starring: Robert Wagner; Teri Garr; Horst Janson; John Standing; Barbara Parkins; Marcel Bozzuffi
- Theme music composer: Nick Bicât
- Country of origin: United States
- Original language: English

Production
- Executive producers: António da Cunha Telles; Robert E. Fuisz
- Producers: Thomas M.C. Johnston; Alfred R. Kelman; Marc Monnet; William F. Storke
- Production location: Portugal
- Cinematography: Dennis C. Lewiston
- Editor: Peter Tanner
- Running time: 115 minutes
- Production companies: Entertainment Partners; Gaylord Productions; HBO Premiere Films

Original release
- Network: HBO
- Release: February 12, 1984

To Catch a King is a 1984 American thriller film directed by Clive Donner and written by Roger O. Hirson. Based on the 1979 novel by Jack Higgins (writing as Harry Patterson), the film stars Robert Wagner, Teri Garr, Horst Janson, John Standing, Barbara Parkins and Marcel Bozzuffi. It premiered on HBO on February 12, 1984.

== Premise ==
The story is a fictionalized account of Operation Willi.

== Cast ==
- Robert Wagner as Joe Jackson
- Teri Garr as Hannah Winter
- Horst Janson as General Walter Schellenberg
- John Standing as Duke of Windsor
- Barbara Parkins as Duchess of Windsor
- Marcel Bozzuffi as Colonel da Cunha
- Jane Lapotaire as Irene Neumann
- Barry Foster as Max Winter
- Peter Egan as Reinhard Heydrich
- John Patrick as Major Kleiber
- Constantine Gregory as Captain Mohta
- John Barron as Sir Walbert Selby
- Edmund Kente as Lord Walter Monckton
- Peter Woodthorpe as Elric Becker
- Lex van Delden as Egger
- Nicholas Courtney as de Oliveira
