= John Barron (actor) =

English actor (1920–2004)

- Born: 24 December 1920; Marylebone, London, England
- Died: 3 July 2004 (aged 83); Watford, Hertfordshire, England
- Occupation: Actor

John Barron (24 December 1920 – 3 July 2004) was an English actor. Although Barron was a familiar face on British television from the 1950s, he is best remembered for his role in the BBC comedy The Fall and Rise of Reginald Perrin (1976–79) playing C.J., Perrin's overbearing boss.

== Early life ==
Born in Marylebone, London, Barron was interested in acting from an early age. For his 18th birthday, his godfather paid his entry fee to RADA. After serving as a Lieutenant in the Royal Navy during the Second World War, he returned to stage acting.

== Career ==
In the 1950s, Barron moved into a directorial role, during which time he came to know Leonard Rossiter. From the mid-1950s, he became more involved in television, and then film. His movies include The Day the Earth Caught Fire (1961), Jigsaw (1962), Incense for the Damned (1970), Hitler: The Last Ten Days (1973), Clash of Loyalties (1983), To Catch a King (1984) and Thirteen at Dinner (1985). He also appeared in such popular TV series as Crown Court, The Avengers, Emergency Ward 10, All Gas and Gaiters, Undermind, The Saint, Department S, Doomwatch, Timeslip, Potter, To the Manor Born, Whoops Apocalypse and Yes Minister.

Although he had long-running roles in popular dramas like the police series Softly, Softly (where he played the assistant chief constable between 1967 and 1969), his best known role was in the situation comedy The Fall and Rise of Reginald Perrin, which began in 1976, and starred Leonard Rossiter as the title character. Barron's character, CJ (Charles Jefferson), was Perrin's overbearing boss with the catchphrase "I didn't get where I am today by...". He also appeared in the 1986 Christmas Special of Duty Free.

Barron was president of the actors' union Equity from 1978 to 1982, and vice-president in 1977 and again from 1984 to 1989.

== Personal life ==
Barron was married three times: first to the actress Joan Sterndale-Bennett, a marriage that soon ended in divorce; then to Joan Peart, who died in 1989 after 40 years of marriage; and finally to Helen Christie, who died in 1995. He had two stepdaughters, one each from the second and third marriages.

Barron's one hobby was enjoying fine wine, which he also inspired his friend Rossiter to take up.

An active supporter of the Conservative Party, Barron presented a Party Political Broadcast on their behalf in the 1980s and featured supporting his party's policies on the BBC's Newsnight programme.

Barron remained active in the acting profession until his death in 2004, aged 83.

== Filmography ==
=== Film ===
Year	Title	Role	Notes
1960	Sink the Bismarck!	Officer P.R.O.	Uncredited
1961	The Day the Earth Caught Fire	First Sub-Editor	Uncredited
1961	The Court Martial of Major Keller	M.O. Aubrey	
1962	Jigsaw	Ray Tenby	
1971	Incense for the Damned	Diplomat	
1973	Hitler: The Last Ten Days	Dr. Stumpfegger	
1983	Al-Mas' Ala Al-Kubra	General Haldane	

=== Television ===
Year	Title	Role	Notes
1948	Acacia Avenue	Michael Carraway	TV film
1948	Children to Bless You	Ronnie Trent	TV film
1949	Mountain Air	Hamish Laurie	TV film
1953	BBC Sunday Night Theatre	Cecil Harvey	Episode: "The Lake"
1957	Sword of Freedom	Merchant	Episode: "Angelica's Past"
1957	The Vise	Tony Preem	Episode: "Corpse with a Sword"
1958	The Vise	Dr. Marsden	Episode: "Death in a Flask"
1958	Theatre Night	Geoffrey Harrison	Episode: "Any Other Business"
1958	ITV Television Playhouse	Anthony Storey	Episode: "The Heat of the Evening"
1958	Armchair Theatre	Henry Walpole	Episode: "I Can Destroy the Sun"
1959	The Wright People	Geoffrey Fairchild	Series regular
1959	Glencannon	John Castle	Recurring role
1959–1964	Emergency Ward 10	Harold de la Roux	Series regular
1960	Hotel Imperial		Episode: "The Cinderella in 104"
1960	On Trial	Travers Humphreys	Episode: "Sir Roger Casement"
1960	No Hiding Place	Inspector Ferris	Episode: "Raising Old Harry"
1960	Saturday Playhouse	Charles	Episode: "Family Occasion"
1960	BBC Sunday-Night Play	Gerrard	Episode: "The Wind and the Sun"
1960	ITV Play of the Week	Lieutenant Colonel Reeve	Episode: "Carrington V.C."
1961	ITV Play of the Week	Dr. Horsham	Episode: "Harriet"
1961	BBC Sunday-Night Play	Patrick McNally	Episode: "Off Centre"
1961	Our Mister Ambler		Episode: "The Blow Lamp"
1961	Plateau of Fear	Dr. Miguel Aranda	Recurring role
1961	Deadline Midnight	Globe's Counsel	Episode: "Libel Story"
1962	Ghost Squad	Lazenger	Episode: "The Grand Duchess"
1962	A Chance to Shine	Henry	TV film
1963	Tales of Mystery	Colonel Masters	Episode: "The Doll"
1963	Brian Rix Presents...	Dr. Rodd	Episode: "Caught Napping"
1963	Dial RIX	Sir William Pardon	Episode: "What a Chassis"
1963	Laughter from the Whitehall	Freddie Neville	Episode: "High Temperature"
1964	Sergeant Cork	Monsieur Billot	Episode: "The Case of the Great Pearl Robbery"
1964	Story Parade	Bartlett	Episode: "The Flaw in the Crystal"
1964	Joan of Arc	Archbishop	Mini-series
1965	Armchair Mystery Theatre	Inspector France	Episode: "Time and Mr Madingley"
1965	Undermind	Sir Geoffrey Tillinger	2 episodes
1965	Cluff	Mr. Liddler	Episode: "The Dictator"
1965	199 Park Lane	Sir George Strudwick	Recurring role
1965	Out of the Unknown	Sir John	Episode: "The Midas Plague"
1966	The Man in the Mirror	Edmund Beatty	Recurring role
1966	The Avengers	Henge	Episode: "A Sense of History"
1966	Armchair Theatre	Government Official	Episode: "The Battersea Miracle"
1966	Pardon the Expression	Lord Penge	Episode: "The Dinner Party"
1966	Comedy Playhouse	The Dean, The Very Reverend Lionel Pugh-Critchley	Episode: "The Bishop Rides Again"
1966	Three Rousing Tinkles	Consultant	Episode: "The Best I Can Do for You by Way of a Gate-leg Table Is a Hundred-weight of Coal"
1966	The Troubleshooters	Price	Episode: "Someone's Head Has to Roll"
1966	The Woman in White	Sir Percival Glyde	Recurring role
1966	The Power Game	Sir. Trevor Hoylake	2 episodes
1966–1969	Softly, Softly	Assistant Chief Constable Austin Gilbert	Series regular
1966–1971	All Gas and Gaiters	The Dean, The Very Reverend Lionel Pugh-Critchley	Series regular
1967	Girl in a Black Bikini	Francis Heager	Recurring role
1967	The Beverly Hillbillies	Chauffeur	Recurring role
1968	The Saint	Neal Lammerton	Episode: "The Scales of Justice"
1969	Jackanory	Bert	Episode: "No One Must Know"
1969	Department S	Byrom Blain	Episode: "The Bones of Byrom Blain"
1969	Hadleigh	Minister	Episode: "M.Y.O.B."
1970	Ace of Wands	Bartlett Bonnington	Episode: "The Smile"
1970–1971	Timeslip	Morgan C. Devereaux	Recurring role
1970–1972	Doomwatch	The Minister	Series regular
1971	The Mind of Mr. J.G. Reeder	Earl of Colebrooke	Episode: "Find the Lady"
1972	Spyder's Web	Admiral Manders	Episode: "Red Admiral"
1972	Pathfinders	James Harley	Episode: "Sitting Ducks"
1973	The Rivals of Sherlock Holmes	Sir Revel Revell, Q.C.	Episode: "The Missing Q.C.s"
1973	Ooh La La!	Soldignac	Episode: "Paying the Piper"
1973	Romany Jones	Mr. Ruskin	Episode: "Look After the Pennies"
1973	Harriet's Back in Town	Peter Ward	Recurring role
1973	The Protectors	Insurance Executive	Episode: "Baubles, Bangles and Beads"
1973	Thirty Minutes Worth		1 episode
1973–1982	Crown Court	Justice Mitchenor	Series regular
1974	The Turn of the Screw	Mr. Fredricks	TV film
1976	The Fosters	Mr. Hudd	Episode: "Situations Vacant"
1976	Victorian Scandals	Colonel Truelove	Episode: "A Pitcher of Snakes"
1976–1979	The Fall and Rise of Reginald Perrin	C.J.	Series regular
1977	The Sunday Drama	Doctor	Episode: "The Late Wife"
1977–1978	The Foundation	Sir Clive Farmer	Series regular
1978	Wodehouse Playhouse	Reverend Stanley Brandon	Episode: "Mulliner's Buck-U-Uppo"
1979	Spooner's Patch	The Golf Club President	Episode: "Par for the Course"
1979	The Glums	Surgeon	1 episode
1979	Jackanory Playhouse	Wizard of Crumm	Episode: "The Wizard of Crumm and the Ice Princess"
1979–1980	Shelley	Cyril	Recurring role
1979–1983	Potter	The Vicar	Series regular
1980	The Gentle Touch	Victor Beresford	Episode: "Loyalties"
1980-81	BBC Television Shakespeare	Vincentio/Duke of Venice	Episodes: The Merchant of Venice and Othello
1981	To the Manor Born	Lumsden	2 episodes
1981	Cowboys	Surgeon	Episode: "Operation Douche"
1981–1986	Yes Minister	Sir Ian Whitchurch, Permanent Secretary to the Environment	2 episodes
1982	Whoops Apocalypse	The Deacon	Series regular
1982	The Funny Side of Christmas	C.J.	TV film
1984	To Catch a King	Selby	TV film
1984	Kelly Monteith		Series regular
1984–1986	No Place Like Home	Mr. Wilberforce	2 episodes
1985	Alice in Wonderland	The Caterpillar	Mini-series
1985	Terry and June	Judge	Episode: "Terry in Court"
1985	Me and My Girl	Mr. Brocklebank	Episode: "Forty Years On"
1985	Thirteen at Dinner	Lord Edgware	TV film
1986	Duty Free	Sir Geoffrey Stoneleigh-Jackson	Episode: "A Duty Free Christmas"
1988	Don't Wait Up	Sir Geoffrey Lawson	1 episode
1990	Brush Strokes	Salamander General	1 episode
1992	In Sickness and in Health	Sir Reginald Woodley	1 episode
1994	The Hypnotic World of Paul McKenna		1 episode
1994	Paris	Degout's Father	Episode: "La solitude"
1996	The Legacy of Reginald Perrin	C.J.	Series regular
