= Horton Rounds =

House in Horton, Northamptonshire, England

Coordinates: 52°10′49″N 0°48′00″W

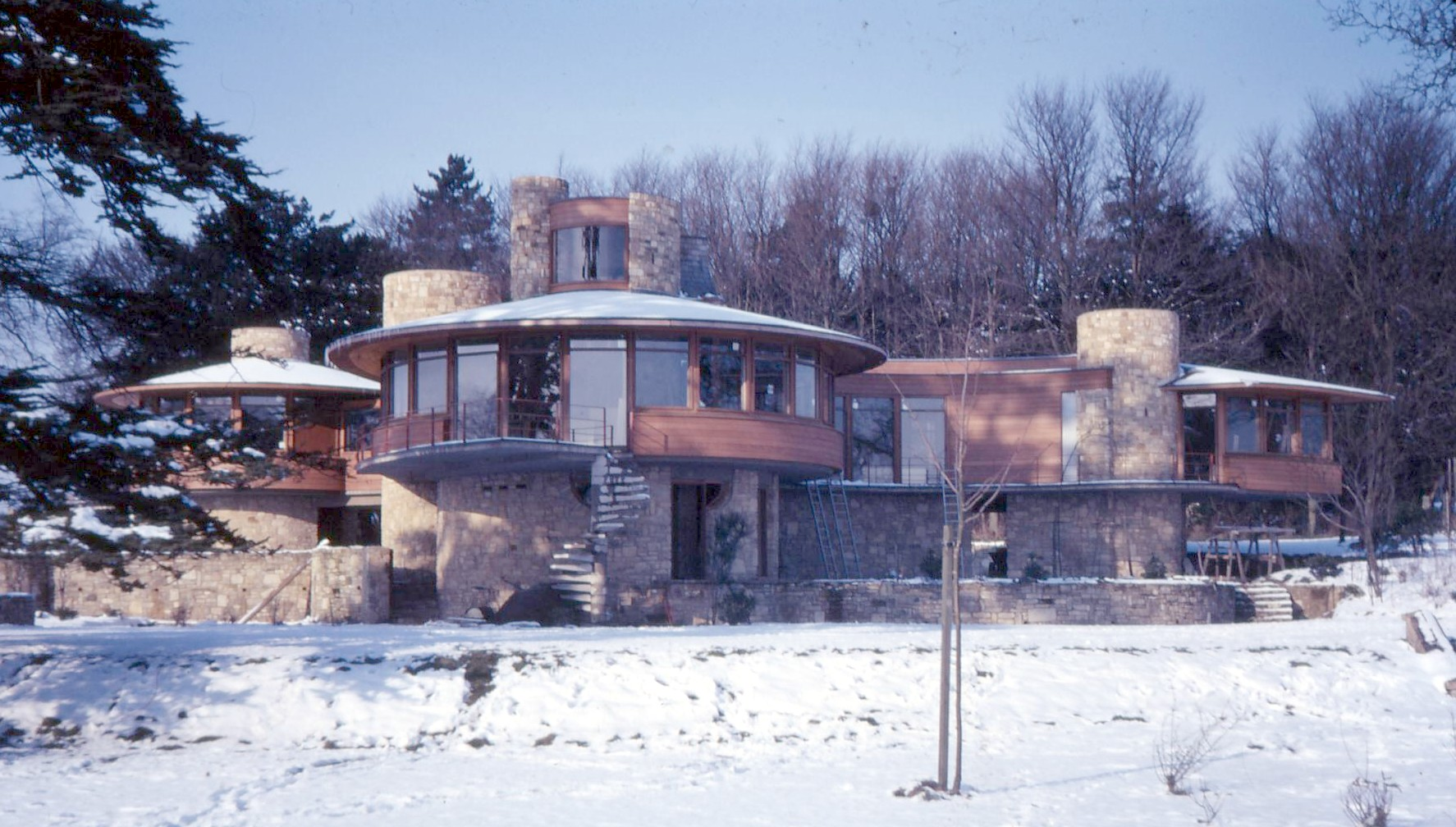
Horton Rounds – the house on a circle

Horton Rounds is a modernist house in the village of Horton, Northamptonshire, England. The house was built in 1966 by A. A. J. Marshman, a senior partner in Marshman, Warren and Taylor, a regional architectural practice.

In September 2012 the house was listed at Grade II on the National Heritage List for England. In the designation it was stated that, "Along with Peter Lambert Gibbs's own house of 1965, Fernhill in Ashdown Forest, and Robert Harvey's houses in Warwickshire, Horton Rounds is one of the best in the country of a small group of post-war houses clearly influenced by the work of Frank Lloyd Wright."

== Description ==
Arthur Marshman – the architect of Horton Rounds

The house was described by the Pevsner Architectural Guide for Northamptonshire as follows:

A striking house. The dominant features are the broad curving eaves of the shingled roofs and the taller circular service cores and chimney of local yellow stone. In plan the house is a comma, with a full stop linked by a bridge. The tail of the comma, open on the ground floor with bedrooms above, shelters a paved garden. The broad end has service rooms and entrances below and a circular living area above which has views in all directions.

The house was built in two phases from 1966; the guest wing being built in the second phase. The family moved into the house in 1972.

In its listing documents for the house, English Heritage reports:

The building was not built entirely as planned; bedroom space was maximised and corridor space was reduced and the breakfast room adjacent to the kitchen was omitted. The building, as constructed, is little altered however. The spare bedroom has been converted into an ensuite for the master bedroom and bathroom and kitchen facilities have been refitted.

MATERIALS: randomly coursed, square-cut local yellow stone is used for the ground floor, stair tower, chimney and addition cores running through the house. The first floor is timber-boarded resting on a concrete slab floor. The roof is shingled with timber-lined eaves.

PLAN: the plan combines circular forms linked by arcs, usefully described by Pevsner in the Buildings of England for Northamptonshire as 'a comma, with a full stop linked by a bridge'. The living room, reception area and kitchen occupy the main circular part, with sleeping accommodation arranged along the tail of the comma. The 'full stop' is a guest wing with a circular plan comprising accommodation and a small sitting area.

EXTERIOR: the house has two storeys with an attic study space. Low-pitched roofs, most with deeply overhanging eaves, accentuate the plan and horizontality of the piece. The elevation of the principal range comprises a series of horizontal bands flowing continuously around the building, interrupted by stone, vertical cores accommodating the stair towers and chimney. On the ground floor is a recessed, stone-built undercroft, partially enclosed to contain a small entrance hall with a spiral stair and a lift to the first- floor reception area and service rooms. A secondary stair emerges adjacent to the kitchen. The undercroft also houses the carport, complete with an inspection pit. The undercroft is punctuated with timber doors and inverted semi-circular openings, some glazed. The overhanging first floor has a nearly continuous band of timber-framed windows. Along the bedroom elevation, a lightweight balcony is accessed from the corridor, master bedroom and kitchen. Another balcony is accessed from the lounge and has an external spiral stair.

To the west is a guest wing with a recessed storage area at ground floor and accommodation at the first floor.

It is linked to the principal range by a bridge at first floor level.

INTERIOR: the majority of the accommodation is on the first floor. The living room, reception area and kitchen occupy the main circular part, with sleeping accommodation arranged along the tail of the comma.

Natural materials predominate; timber and fair-faced stone with area of white-painted render. The house retains much of the original fixtures and fitted furniture, notably in the principal living space. The roof-line is expressed internally with the wood-lined ceilings, allowing for clerestory windows in the bedrooms.

Elsewhere, the windows are designed to drop down into the wall when opened. The bands of windows to the circular living room and study of the main range maximise the extensive views of the garden. At the centre of the living room is a stone fireplace and chimney, around which wrap the spiral stairs leading to the study, enclosing the snug adjacent to the chimney in the living room.

SUBSIDIARY FEATURES: steps lead from the attached terrace to the paved garden with a pond, partially sheltered by the house, link the different levels. The garden with its lamps, garden walls and landscaping form part of the original design and are integral to both the plan and form of the house. The garden also incorporates stone steps from an older garden.

The Marshman family lived in the house until the mid-1980s and the house has had several other owners since; for many years it was in the ownership of the comedy writer Roy Clarke.
