= The Spare Tyres =

1967 British film by Michael J. Lane

- Directed by: Michael J. Lane
- Screenplay by: Donald Churchill
- Produced by: Kenneth Cowan
- Starring: Terence Alexander; Frank Finlay
- Cinematography: Lewis Mcleod
- Edited by: Michael J. Lane
- Music by: Hugo de Groot
- Production company: Sandpiper Films
- Release date: 1967
- Running time: 27 minutes
- Country: United Kingdom
- Language: English

The Spare Tyres is a 1967 British short comedy film directed by Michael J. Lane and featuring Terence Alexander, Judy Franklin, Pauline Yates, and Frank Finlay. It was written by Donald Churchill and produced by Kenneth Cowan for Sandpiper Films.

== Plot ==
Dennis and his wife move to a new house. Discovering a pair of old tyres in the garden, he spends the rest of the day trying, unsuccessfully, to get rid of them.

== Cast ==
- Terence Alexander as Dennis
- Frank Finlay as council foreman
- Judy Franklin
- Kenneth Cowan
- Julia Jones
- Marika Morley
- Max Butterfield
- Tenniel Evans
- Donald Churchill
- Pauline Yates

== Reception ==
In 1968 Kine Weekly wrote: "The comedy is light and slight, mostly amusing and appropriately kept down to 27 minutes. Very useful British filler."

The Monthly Film Bulletin wrote in 1978: "Desperately unfunny programme filler, unaccountably revived after ten years on the shelf. The 'humour' is largely a matter of telegraphed sight gags (sample: a runaway milk float is labelled 'U.D.D.A. Dairies'); cast mug, grimace and generally look uncomfortable."
