= Potter (TV series) =

British TV sitcom (1979–1983)

- Title card of episode one, featuring Arthur Lowe as Potter
- Starring: Arthur Lowe; Robin Bailey; Noel Dyson
- Country of origin: United Kingdom
- Original language: English
- No. of series: 3
- No. of episodes: 20

Production
- Running time: 30 minutes
- Production company: BBC

Original release
- Network: BBC1
- Release: 1 March 1979 – 28 August 1983

Potter is a British sitcom written by Roy Clarke. Running for three series, it originally starred Arthur Lowe as Redvers Potter, a busybody former sweet manufacturer ("Pottermints - the hotter mints") with time on his hands following retirement. Set in Surrey, the series followed Potter in his various attempts to keep himself occupied by interfering in other people's business.

The series co-starred Noel Dyson as his wife Aileen, John Barron as the Vicar, Lally Bowers as Redvers' sister Harriet, Ken Wynne as Harriet's eccentric and camp husband Willie and John Warner as "Tolly" Tolliver, his next-door neighbour. Characters in later series included Harry H. Corbett as the comic ex-gangster Harry Tooms and Brenda Cowling as Jane.

== Episodes ==
The first series comprised 6 episodes, and aired in March–April, 1979.

The second series comprised 7 episodes, and aired the following year, from February–April, 1980.

Plans for a third series were already underway when Lowe died (in April 1982), so Lowe was replaced by Robin Bailey in the 7-episode third series, which aired the following year between July–August 1983, after which the series was discontinued.

Most episodes end with Potter and the Vicar sitting on a sofa discussing the events that unfolded throughout the episode, and in Series 3 end with them sitting outside in the vicarage.

== Third series ==
There were plans that the third series of Potter, starring Arthur Lowe, would be recorded in the summer of 1982, with six further episodes. They would most likely have been broadcast in the spring of 1983.

== Reception ==
Mark Lewisohn notes that although many of the characters (long-suffering wife, vicar, neighbour) were sitcom clichés "they seemed less so in the skilled hands of writer Roy Clarke, who had already proved a master of naturally humorous dialogue".

== Cast and characters ==
- Redvers Potter (Arthur Lowe (series 1-2), Robin Bailey (series 3)), a retired sweet manufacturer, who is determined to keep productive in his retirement. He is ignorant towards other people and he considers himself an expert on almost everything. Most times he asserts himself, the recipient of his 'helpful suggestions' ends up worse than they were before he became involved. He is snobbish towards non-English people, the younger generation and also the lower classes. He also overwhelms his wife into doing things that she does not want to do like taking long walks and cutting out on fatty foods although he doesn't do the same. Lowe only appears in the first two series (13 episodes).
- Aileen Potter (Noel Dyson) Redvers' long suffering wife who clearly loves her husband but is annoyed by his snobbish attitude. She is a stay at home wife. She is the only character who appears in all 20 episodes over the three series.
- Gerald, The Vicar (John Barron) Potter's best friend.
- Harriet (Lally Bowers)
- Willie (Ken Wynne)
- "Tolly" Tolliver (John Warner)
- Harry Tooms (Sydney Tafler) (series 1), (Harry H. Corbett) (series 2)
- Jane (Brenda Cowling), the vicar's wife

== Novelisation ==
A book written by Christine Sparks based on the characters of Roy Clarke was published in 1979.
