= The Fall and Rise of Reginald Perrin =

British TV sitcom (1976–1996)

- Cover of the DVD release of the 1st series
- Created by: David Nobbs
- Starring: Leonard Rossiter (Fall and Rise); Pauline Yates; David Warwick (series 1); Sally-Jane Spencer; Tim Preece (series 1–2 and Legacy); Leslie Schofield (series 3); Sue Nicholls; John Barron; Geoffrey Palmer; Trevor Adams (Fall and Rise); Bruce Bould; John Horsley; Derry Power (series 2–3); Joseph Brady (series 3); Theresa Watson (series 3); Patricia Hodge (Legacy); Michael Fenton Stevens (Legacy)
- Theme music composer: Ronnie Hazlehurst
- Country of origin: United Kingdom
- Original language: English
- No. of series: 3 (Fall and Rise); 1 (Legacy)
- No. of episodes: 21 (Fall and Rise); 7 (Legacy) (list of episodes)

Production
- Producers: Gareth Gwenlan; John Howard Davies (pilot)
- Running time: 30 minutes

Original release
- Network: BBC1
- Release: 8 September 1976 – 31 October 1996

Related
- Reggie Perrin (UK remake); Reggie (US remake); Fairly Secret Army

The Fall and Rise of Reginald Perrin is a British sitcom starring Leonard Rossiter in the title role. Three series were produced from 1976 to 1979, based on a series of novels written by David Nobbs. Nobbs adapted the screenplay for the first series from the first novel. Some of its subplots were considered too dark or risqué for television and were toned down or omitted. A fourth series, The Legacy of Reginald Perrin, also written by Nobbs, followed in 1996.

The story concerns a middle-aged middle manager, Reginald "Reggie" Perrin, who is driven to bizarre behaviour by the pointlessness of his job at Sunshine Desserts.

The first novel in the series, The Death of Reginald Perrin, was published in 1975. Later editions were retitled to match the title of the television series. The Return of Reginald Perrin (1977) and The Better World of Reginald Perrin (1978) were written by Nobbs to be adapted for the second and third television series; Rossiter did not want to take the series forward unless it continued to be grounded in novels.

A new dramatisation of the original novels by Jon Canter, without the complications introduced in the TV series, was broadcast on BBC Radio Four in November 2022.

== Episodes ==
=== Series One (8 September – 20 October 1976) ===
The first series was based on Nobbs' novel The Death of Reginald Perrin, retitled The Fall and Rise of Reginald Perrin to tie in with the television series; it retains the replacement title.

46-year-old Reginald Iolanthe Perrin is suffering a midlife crisis and tries to escape his dreary life. He lives at 12 Coleridge Close, part of the 'Poets Estate' in a south London suburb called Climthorpe, a development differing from those around it only by having its streets named after famous poets. From references, it would have approximately coincided with Teddington (although in episode 1, he is seen entering Norbiton railway station). He commutes to Sunshine Desserts, where he works as a sales executive. Each morning he is 11 minutes late (this increased to 17 then 22 minutes with subsequent series), yet each morning he gives a different excuse. These become increasingly bizarre ("defective junction box, New Malden" being one of the more plausible ones), reflecting the decline of British Rail and of his own mental health. He enters the office building under the Sunshine Desserts sign which, as the series progresses, loses more and more of its letters.

"Reggie", as he is known, daydreams in Walter Mitty style. Part of the narrative demonstrates what voices in his head are saying. Although he appears to love his wife, he fantasises about his secretary, Joan Greengross. As his behaviour becomes more erratic, Reggie is unable to dictate letters without uttering words like "breast". Far from being offended, Joan welcomes the attention, adjusting her posture to show off her figure.

The endless marketing campaigns for bizarre products, satirised in reports from the product research department, combine with Reggie's relations with his oppressive boss 'CJ' and his yes-man subordinates to drive him over the edge. Ceasing to care about the consequences, he dictates offensive and condescending replies to customers.

At home, things are no better. Despite his warm relationship with his wife Elizabeth, he suffers from impotence. As pressures at work build, relations with his dysfunctional relatives deteriorate. His brother-in-law Jimmy and son-in-law Tom are both presented as incompetent. Tom's political correctness emphasises his pomposity. After Reggie commits a few reckless acts, including getting out of his car in the lion enclosure at a safari park, he fakes suicide by leaving clothes and personal effects on a beach.

Before this he sends CJ an anonymous threat containing the words "blood will flow" and dumps loganberry essence into a stream while CJ is angling. CJ collapses and the incompetent company doctor, Doc Morrissey, pronounces him dead. CJ opens one eye and says, "You're fired!"

Assuming disguises, Reggie encounters more of the banal and pompous side of life. Only as a buck-toothed farm labourer does he find fulfilment working in a sewage works and looking after pigs. Missing his wife, he assumes the identity of Martin Wellbourne, returned from South America, and visits her. He realises he still loves her. Elizabeth, seeing through his disguise, is happy to have him back.

=== Series Two (21 September – 2 November 1977) ===
In the second series (novelised as The Return of Reginald Perrin), Reggie is tired of being Martin Wellbourne and wants to be Reggie again. He reveals his true identity to his family (though his wife and daughter already know). When CJ learns from Doc Morrissey that he is Reggie, he sacks them both. Elizabeth goes out to work at Sunshine Desserts and Reggie returns to the pig farm, but they are both sacked after Reggie's employer learns of his faked suicide and Elizabeth sends a rude letter telling the truth about Sunshine's products.

Reggie then opens a shop called Grot, where he sells useless products – like square hoops, round dice and Tom's wine (made from sprouts, nettles and the like) – hoping it will be an interesting failure. However, the products are snapped up as novelties and Grot becomes a huge success. Reggie relapses into alienation and tries to destroy Grot from within by hiring incompetents, but this backfires as they all display unsuspected talents. Reggie finally resolves to disappear again, this time accompanied by Elizabeth.

=== Series Three (29 November 1978 – 24 January 1979) ===
In the third series (novelised as The Better World of Reginald Perrin), after seeing two men arguing pointlessly in a queue at the bank, Reggie and his wife open a community called Perrins for the middle-aged, middle class, designed to help them become "better, happier people". The project is a success until a group of people who have fallen afoul of the "Perrins Peace Keeping Force" trash the place.

Reggie is then hired by CJ's brother FJ at Amalgamated Aerosols, working directly under CJ. Reggie instantly returns to his eccentric ways and the final scene shows him contemplating another trip to the Dorset coast.

In the third series, the role of Reggie's son-in-law Tom is played by Leslie Schofield, replacing Tim Preece, who had played the role in the first two series. Preece returned to the role for The Legacy of Reginald Perrin (see below). Despite only being mentioned (rather than seen) in the previous series, Theresa Watson also became a regular cast member playing Pru, the wife of David Harris-Jones (Bruce Bould).

=== Christmas sketch (26 December 1982) ===
In 1982, as part of a BBC1 Christmas special called The Funny Side of Christmas, a short sketch featured the regular cast visiting Reggie's house on Christmas Day. Despite being annoyed at the continual interruption of his colleagues' arrival, he dispenses presents from beneath his own Christmas tree. In a final scene, Reggie's living room is shown empty, even of furniture. The sketch is unrelated to the regular series, which had finished three years earlier in 1979.

=== The Legacy of Reginald Perrin (22 September – 31 October 1996) ===
This follow-up series, made more than a decade after Leonard Rossiter's death, shows Reggie's legacy – a fortune left to friends and family, but with strange conditions. Both book and series were titled The Legacy of Reginald Perrin.

In the series, Reggie's family and friends are told by lawyer Geraldine Hackstraw that each will inherit one million pounds, on the one condition that they do something totally absurd. The nature of their absurd task is left to the individuals, but it is to be judged by Ms Hackstraw. Most of them have fallen on hard times, having in the main been forced to retire or been made redundant due to their age.

After several pathetic solo attempts at being absurd (including both CJ and Doc asking out Geraldine), the potential legatees decide to pool forces, and, with Jimmy as leader, decide to mount a bloodless coup. They intend to reverse age roles, with such policies as pensions for the young. The policies are a success, but with the unexpected outcome of their losing the money in the bequest. As Geraldine points out, the idea has turned out not to be absurd after all (although Ms Hackstraw's final words to Jimmy as they parted mentioned that it was open for the group to come back to her with a more absurd plan to claim the bequest).

The series' characters and actors comprised all of the central characters of the earlier series, except Reginald Perrin and Tony Webster (Trevor Adams). It also included Patricia Hodge as Geraldine Hackstraw and Michael Fenton Stevens as Hank.

== Cast ==
- Leonard Rossiter as Reginald Iolanthe "Reggie" Perrin, a middle-aged middle manager suffering a nervous breakdown
- Pauline Yates as Elizabeth Perrin, Reggie's wife
- David Warwick as Mark Perrin, their son (series one only)
- Sally-Jane Spencer as Linda Patterson, their daughter
- Tim Preece (first two series and Legacy) and Leslie Schofield (third series) as Tom Patterson, Linda's husband (catchphrase: "I'm not a —— person.")
- Sue Nicholls as Joan Greengross, Reggie's secretary
- John Barron as C.J. (Charles Jefferson), Reggie's boss C.J. is much given to Dundrearyisms and pompous statements beginning, "I didn't get where I am today by ..." – except when Reggie becomes his boss, whereupon he says, "I didn't get where you are today by ..."; also, "Neither Mrs C. J. nor I have ever..." and "We're not one of those dreadful firms that..." Barron also appears as C.J.'s brother F.J.
- Trevor Adams as Tony Webster (catchphrase: "Great!", but adopted " —— City, Arizona" and "Knockout" in the third series)
- Bruce Bould as David Harris-Jones (catchphrase: "Super!")
- Geoffrey Palmer as Jimmy Anderson, Elizabeth's brother, an Army officer (catchphrase: "Bit of a cock up on the —— front.")
- John Horsley as Doc (Gerald) Morrissey, company doctor at Sunshine Desserts
- Derry Power as Seamus Finnegan, "a poor tongue-tied labourer from the land of the bogs and the little people" with an unrecognised genius for management (series two and three only)
- Joseph Brady as Kenny McBlane, Scottish chef at Perrin's (series three only)
- Theresa Watson as Pru Harris-Jones, wife of David Harris-Jones
- Patricia Hodge as Geraldine Hackstraw, Reggie's lawyer and executor of his will (Legacy only)
- Michael Fenton Stevens as Hank Millbeck, Joan's lover and later husband (Legacy only; catchphrase: "Wicked!")
- David Ryall as Welton Ormsby, a redundant journalist who joins the old-age campaign (Legacy only)

== Production ==
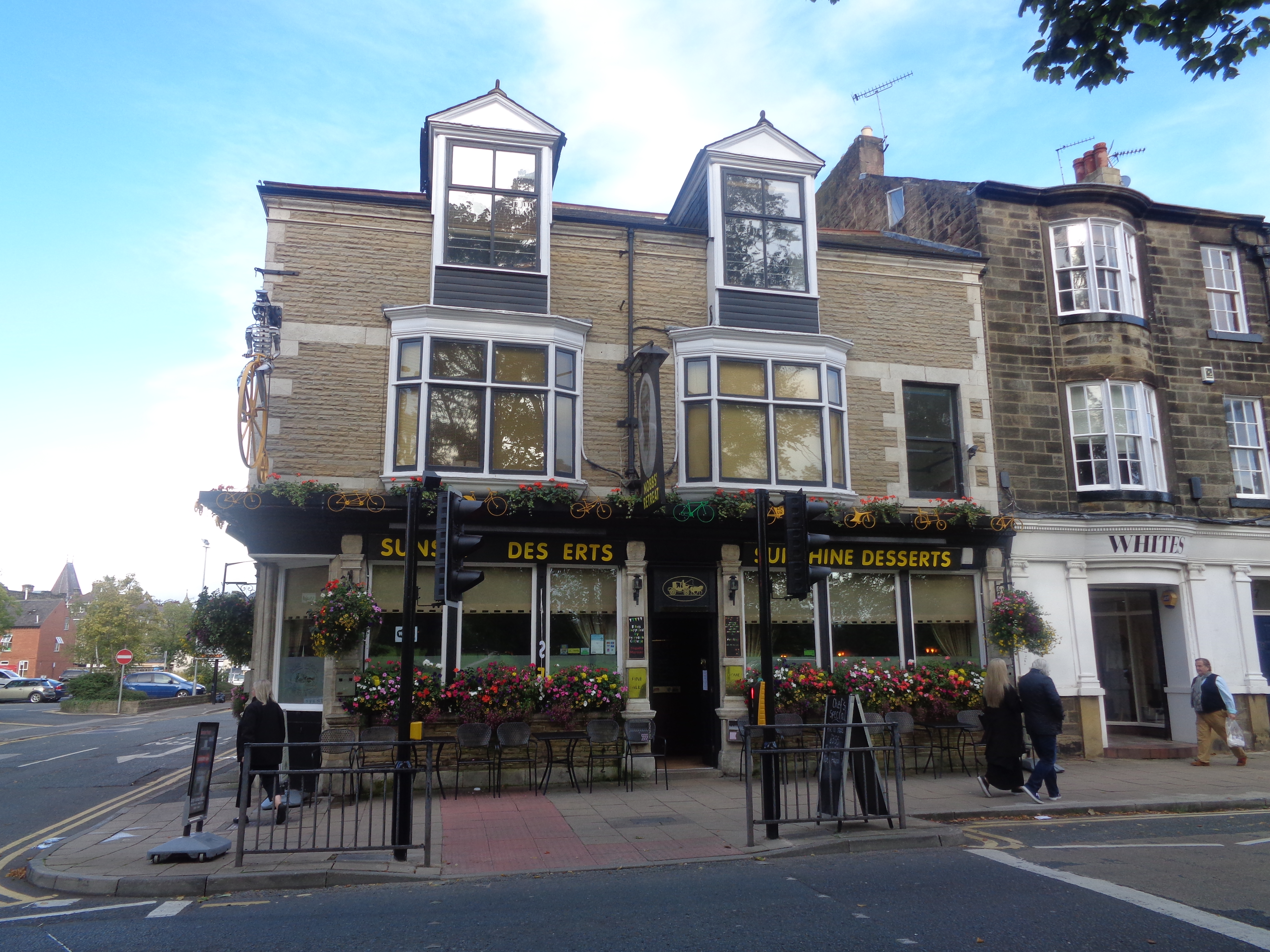
A pub in Harrogate, North Yorkshire dressed as Sunshine Desserts following writer David Nobbs' death

At the end of the first series, Reggie fakes suicide by leaving his clothes on a beach in West Bay, Dorset and running into the sea. Coincidentally, MP John Stonehouse faked his own death in this manner shortly before the book was published, although neither was inspired by the other; the novel was written before Stonehouse's faked suicide in November 1974, but not published until 1975. The phrase "do a Reggie Perrin" did enter the vernacular, however, assisted by the Stonehouse affair.

The series introduced catchphrases that entered popular culture in the UK, including Perrin's reflexive apology for a late arrival at the office; his boss CJ's "I didn't get where I am today ..."; the fawning junior executives Tony Webster and David Harris-Jones with their alternating "great/super"; and Perrin's brother-in-law Major Jimmy Anderson, an army officer with no grasp of organisation or leadership, coming to eat because of a "bit of a cock-up on the catering front" (caused in the original novel by his wife's alcoholism).

The first series included the character of Mark Perrin, Reggie's son, played by David Warwick. However, David Nobbs felt he diverted the comedy from Reggie, so he was written out by going on tour with a theatre group in Africa. His absence from Legacy is never explained.

Although mainly produced on video and shot on studio sets, the series also incorporated innovative surreal escapism through film inserts, notably during scenes in which, whenever his mother-in-law is mentioned, Reggie visualises a hippopotamus trotting along.

Writer David Nobbs went on to create the Channel 4 comedy series Fairly Secret Army, whose lead character, Harry, was inspired by, if not directly related to, the Perrin character of Jimmy, and also played by Geoffrey Palmer. It can be seen as a direct continuation of Jimmy's plan, set out in the second series/novel to create a group to oppose the "forces of disorder in society". However, as the BBC owned the TV rights to the characters, the character was renamed, and all links to Perrin were removed.

=== Filming ===
Exterior views of the Perrin residence – 12 Coleridge Close, in the fictional suburb of Climthorpe – were shot at 6 Beaufort Close, Ealing, W5. Reggie's walk to work was shot on the corner of Audley Road and The Ridings, and on the corner of Ashbourne Close. All three roads are within about 100 yd (91 m) of one another.

Many exterior scenes were filmed at sites in Cheltenham, including Eldorado Road and the Beehive public house.

The Sunshine Desserts office building was at 32–36 Telford Way, Acton (now demolished).

Reggie's faked suicide, which formed part of the title sequence, occurred at West Bay, Dorset, with the East Cliff visible in the very opening shot.

The first episode begins with commuters making their way to Norbiton railway station in the Royal Borough of Kingston upon Thames. The morning trains' constant lateness in the earlier series is usually blamed on incidents at actual stations along the railway from Norbiton and Kingston to Waterloo.

== DVD releases ==
DVD title	Country of release	Region	Date of Release	DVD company	Catalog number	Notes
The Fall and Rise of Reginald Perrin – The Complete 1st Series	UK	0 (PAL)	21 October 2002	Second Sight Films	2NDVD 3042	Now out of print
The Fall and Rise of Reginald Perrin – The Complete 2nd Series	UK	0 (PAL)	21 October 2002	Second Sight Films	2NDVD 3048	Now out of print
The Fall and Rise of Reginald Perrin – The Complete 3rd Series	UK	0 (PAL)	19 May 2003	Second Sight Films	2NDVD 3049	Now out of print
The Fall and Rise of Reginald Perrin – The Complete Collection	UK	0 (PAL)	6 October 2003	Second Sight Films	2NDVD 3062	3-disc box set of all 3 series. Now out of print
The Fall and Rise of Reginald Perrin – The Complete Collection	UK	2	27 April 2009	2 Entertain		5 Disc set of all 3 series, Legacy and The Funny Side of Christmas
The Fall and Rise of Reginald Perrin – The Complete Series	USA	1	12 May 2009	E1 Entertainment		4 Disc set of all 3 series, and The Funny Side of Christmas

== Remakes ==
A short-lived American version was produced and broadcast on ABC in 1983 as Reggie, with Richard Mulligan in the title role.

Martin Clunes starred in a BBC revival of the series, titled simply Reggie Perrin. The supporting cast members were Fay Ripley, Wendy Craig, Geoffrey Whitehead, Neil Stuke, and Lucy Liemann. The series was written by Simon Nye and original series creator David Nobbs. It ran for two series from April 2009 to November 2010.

== Stage musical adaptation ==
In 2019, it was announced that a stage musical adaptation was in development written by Jonathan Coe and David Quantick with Mike Batt writing the songs. Sean Foley, artistic director of the Birmingham Repertory Theatre also revealed he was involved with the adaptation.

== See also ==
British sitcom
