= Donald Churchill =

English actor and playwright (1930–1991)

- Born: 6 November 1930; Southall, Middlesex, England
- Died: 29 October 1991 (aged 60); Fuengirola, Spain
- Occupations: Actor and playwright
- Years active: 1956-his death
- Spouse: Pauline Yates (m. 1960)
- Children: 2, including Jemma

Donald Churchill (6 November 1930 – 29 October 1991) was an English actor and playwright. He appeared in many film and television productions over a 35-year period and wrote several TV scripts.

== Career ==
His films included Barnacle Bill (1957), The Captain's Table (1959), Victim (1961), The Wild Affair (1964), Zeppelin (1971), The First Great Train Robbery (1978), Charlie Muffin (1979) and The Hound of the Baskervilles (1983) as Doctor Watson. On television he starred in Bulldog Breed (1962), Spooner's Patch (1980-1982), played game show host Ronnie Kemp in Goodnight and God Bless (which Churchill also co-wrote, 1983), Mr Scott Eccles in an adaptation of "The Adventure of Wisteria Lodge" for The Return of Sherlock Holmes in 1988, and appeared in Stanley and the Women (1991) and C.A.T.S. Eyes. He co-wrote Moody and Pegg, with Julia Jones (dramatist), in 1974. His plays include Mixed Feelings, The Decorator, and Moments of Weakness.

== Personal life ==
Churchill married the actress Pauline Yates in 1960; the couple had two daughters, Jemma and Polly (d. 2018).

== Death ==
He died in Spain of a heart attack after filming his final episode of El C.I.D. for Granada Television in which he played the irascible harbour master Metcalf.

== Filmography (actor) ==
- Barnacle Bill (1957) as Roy
- Carve Her Name with Pride (1958) as Roy Bushell (uncredited)
- A Night to Remember (1958) as passenger (uncredited)
- The Captain's Table (1959) as Jay
- Yesterday's Enemy (1959) as Elliott (uncredited)
- Sink the Bismarck! (1960) as seaman on Ark Royal (uncredited)
- Doctor in Love (1960) as doctor (uncredited)
- No Love for Johnnie (1961) as Sheilah's party guest (uncredited)
- Victim (1961) as Eddy
- Spaceflight IC-1 (1965) as Carl Walcott
- The Wild Affair (1965) as Andy
- Zeppelin (1971) (uncredited)
- The First Great Train Robbery (1979) as prosecutor
- Charlie Muffin (1979) as Wilberforce
- The Hound of the Baskervilles (1983) as Dr. John Watson

== Filmography (writer) ==
- The Spare Tyres (1967)
