= Roy Clarke =

English comedy writer (born 1930)

Sir Roy Clarke OBE
- Born: 28 January 1930 (age 96); Austerfield, West Riding of Yorkshire, England
- Occupation: Television screenwriter
- Years active: 1968–present
- Television: Last of the Summer Wine; Open All Hours; Rosie; Potter; The Magnificent Evans; Keeping Up Appearances; Still Open All Hours; Ain't Misbehavin'
- Spouse: Enid Kitching

Sir Roy Clarke (born 28 January 1930) is an English comedy writer, best known for creating and writing the sitcoms Last of the Summer Wine (1973–2010), Keeping Up Appearances (1990–1995), Open All Hours (1976–1985) and its sequel series, Still Open All Hours (2013–2019).

== Early life ==
Clarke was born in Austerfield, West Riding of Yorkshire on 28 January 1930. He was, in the words of his Who's Who entry, educated "badly during World War II", attending St Norbert's School, the Collegiate School in Doncaster, and lastly Gainsborough Grammar School in Lincolnshire. He completed his national service as a member of the Royal Corps of Signals in the Middle East. Upon returning to England, he married Enid Kitching. For two years, he worked as a policeman, where he was based in Swinton and Thrybergh, writing stories in his spare time. Upon leaving the force, Clarke worked at a Burton tailoring factory, before becoming a teacher, securing an eight-year position at Thorne Secondary School for Boys. Around this time, Clarke began submitting scripts and ideas to various television companies.

== Career ==
In 1966, Clarke's play The Big Bite was accepted by the BBC, his first to be accepted by a broadcaster. Produced by Alan Ayckbourn, it was broadcast on the Light Programme on 22 June, as part of the Midweek Theatre anthology series. A script for the television drama series The Troubleshooters (1965–72) was accepted the same year. In 1968, Clarke left his teaching position to focus on his writing career. He wrote one-off scripts for various television series until, in 1969, his first full-length play, titled The John Hilarian Salt Exhibition and Numerous Illustrated Slides, was broadcast on ITV. The play featured many common themes that would become present in his later works, which writer and historian Graham McCann described as "a focus on an ensemble of characters rather than merely a single dominant one; a range of intriguing women as well as men; a fascination with the organic eccentrics of a community; and playfully peculiar dialogue". The play attracted media attention, elevating his reputation in the public eye.

Clarke's first sitcom, The Misfit, was broadcast on ITV from 1970 to 1971. Ronald Fraser starred as Basil Allenby-Johnson, a character who had previously appeared in one of Clarke's scripts for The Troubleshooters. Fraser starred as an old-fashioned Edwardian man who returns to England after spending years on a Malayan rubber plantation; the series followed his attempts to assimilate into modern day society after his many years away. Clarke stated that the character served as "the spokesman for the middle ground", who symbolised "the kind of man who is very much undervalued today. I would be happier with him in charge than any extremist – at least he is for work and keeping the show on the road". The series was a success, being praised by critics and earning Clarke a Writer's Guild Award. Clarke was offered to write a third series, but declined, instead wishing to work on other projects.

In 1972, Clarke began working on the ideas for Last of the Summer Wine (1973–2010) and Open All Hours (1973–85), which were, at the time, some of the few British sitcoms set in – and featuring humour from – the North of England. Clarke was the sole writer of all 295 episodes of Last of the Summer Wine, which at its peak had an audience of over 18 million viewers. It featured Bill Owen, Peter Sallis, Brian Wilde in leading roles. While Clarke was not involved in casting, he wrote the character named Clegg with Sallis specifically in mind. Clarke also wrote a prequel to the series, First of the Summer Wine. Open All Hours, which was regularly interrupted by the lead actors – Ronnie Barker and David Jason – having to undertake other projects, ran for four series over nine years, becoming the most popular British sitcom of the 1980s.

In 1974, Clarke created the sitcom Oh No It's Selwyn Froggitt, from an idea by its star Bill Maynard. He wrote the pilot episode, but left to be replaced by Alan Plater when the programme went to a series. Clarke drew on his experiences as a policeman to write The Growing Pains of PC Penrose (1975) and its successor Rosie (1977–1981). His following sitcom, Potter starring Arthur Lowe, was set in the South of England and ran from 1979 to 1983. The Magnificent Evans (1984) was set in Wales and, again, starred Barker in the lead role. Later, Clarke wrote Keeping Up Appearances, which ran from 1990 to 1995. Starring Patricia Routledge and Clive Swift, the sitcom was the biggest success of Clarke's later career, becoming the most exported television programme distributed by BBC Worldwide. In 1994, Clarke created another Yorkshire-based sitcom with Ain't Misbehavin' (1994–1995), starring Peter Davison and Nicola Pagett.

Clarke also created and wrote the short-lived fantasy drama The Wanderer, starring Bryan Brown, for Sky One. In addition, he wrote the screenplay to the feature film Hawks (1988), as well as writing the well-received drama A Foreign Field (1993). In 2003, Clarke adapted his Last of the Summer Wine chronicle The Moonbather for a world premiere performance at the Scunthorpe Little Theatre Club.

In 2013, aged in his eighties, Clarke revived Open All Hours for a sequel series, Still Open All Hours, starring David Jason. Six series were broadcast from 2013 to 2019, before the COVID-19 pandemic interrupted the scheduling of its seventh series. In 2016, Clarke created a prequel to Keeping Up Appearances titled Young Hyacinth. The one-off episode premiered on 2 September 2016 on BBC One.

== Personal life ==
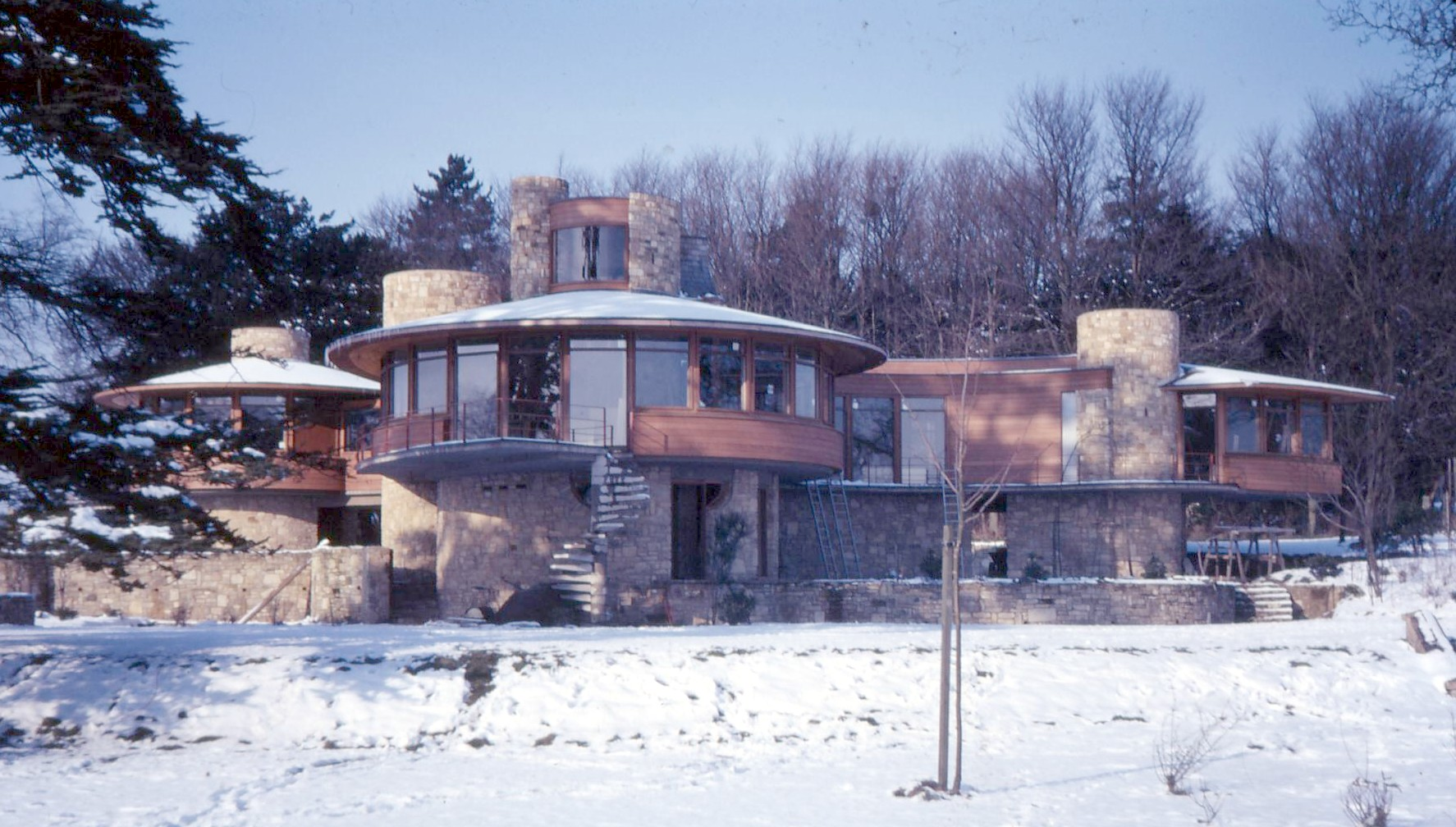
Horton Rounds, Northamptonshire, c. 1971–1972.

Following his national service, Clarke married Enid Kitching. Their children included Stephen R. Clarke, a screenwriter. From the 1970s onwards, he resided in the rural village of Sykehouse, near Goole, in the East Riding of Yorkshire. For some years, he owned Horton Rounds in Northamptonshire, a Grade II listed house designed by the Northamptonshire architect Arthur A. J. Marshman.

== Awards and recognition ==
In 1994, Clarke was granted the Freedom of the Borough of Doncaster; the highest honour the Council can bestow. In the 2002 New Year Honours, he was appointed an Officer of the Order of the British Empire (OBE) for services to comedy drama. Clarke was awarded the lifetime achievement award at the 2010 British Comedy Awards. He was given a knighthood in the 2026 New Year Honours.
