= My Honourable Mrs =

1975 British TV comedy series

- Genre: Sitcom
- Written by: Richard Waring
- Starring: Derek Nimmo; Pauline Yates
- Composer: Dennis Wilson
- Country of origin: United Kingdom
- Original language: English
- No. of series: 1
- No. of episodes: 7

Production
- Producer: Graeme Muir
- Running time: 30 minutes
- Production company: BBC

Original release
- Network: BBC 1
- Release: 14 July – 26 August 1975

My Honourable Mrs is a British comedy television series which originally aired on BBC 1 in summer 1975. Centred around a fictional female politician, it was broadcast a few months after Margaret Thatcher was elected leader of the Conservative Party. Henry Prendergast (Derek Nimmo) is a publisher whose life is thrown out of balance when his wife Jane (Pauline Yates) is elected as Tory MP.

== Main cast ==
- Derek Nimmo as Henry Prendergast
- Pauline Yates as Jane Prendergast
- Aubrey Woods as Trevor Crichton
- Anthony Howden as Tim
- Sylvestra Le Touzel as Sarah
- Nicholas Drake as William
- Alan Curtis as Eric Forbes
- Caroline Dowdeswell as Susan

== Bibliography ==
- Steven Fielding. A State of Play: British Politics on Screen, Stage and Page, from Anthony Trollope to The Thick of It. A&C Black, 2014.
