= Paul Chapman (actor) =

British actor (born 1939)

Paul Chapman (born 1939) is a British actor. He made his acting debut in 1964 in the series Curtain of Fear, and is best known for his recurring roles as Captain George Brent in Colditz (1972–74) and Stephen in As Time Goes By (1993–2005).

Chapman was born in London in 1939 and is the brother of screenwriter and actor John Chapman, and a nephew of actor Edward Chapman. Since graduating from RADA (Royal Academy of Dramatic Art) in the early 1960s, he has had an extensive career on stage and on screen. He has a number of high-profile television series to his name, including The Adventures of Sherlock Holmes, A Bit of a Do, Fairly Secret Army, Pie in the Sky and Midsomer Murders. He starred in Colditz.

Chapman's other TV credits include Waiting for God ("The Helicopter" episode as Councillor Ferguson), and in the BBC's 1971 adaptation of Jane Austen's Persuasion, as Captain Benwick. In December 1971 he created the role of Nogbad the Bad in a Birmingham stage adaptation of the animated TV series Noggin the Nog. In the early 1980s he appeared in several roles in the BBC Television Shakespeare.

He was known in the late 1980s for playing Harwell Mincing in ITV's children's costume drama Return of the Antelope. In 1998 he played Reg Buckley in Midsomer Murders "Faithful unto Death". In later years, he has become known for his portrayal of Stephen in the BBC sitcom As Time Goes By, alongside Judi Dench and Geoffrey Palmer. Chapman took on the role in Series 2 and appeared regularly until the show ended in 2002, returning for the Christmas Specials in 2005. He appeared in Midsomer Murders "The Great and the Good" in 2009 as Howard Richardson.
