= List of As Time Goes By episodes =

This is a list of the 67 episodes of the BBC TV sitcom As Time Goes By, starring Judi Dench and Geoffrey Palmer, broadcast between 12 January 1992 and 30 December 2005. With the exception of the final three episodes, all episodes are 30 minutes long.

== Series overview ==
Series	Episodes	Originally released	
Series	Episodes	First released	Last released
1	6	12 January 1992	16 February 1992
2	7	10 January 1993	21 February 1993
3	10	2 January 1994	6 March 1994
4	10	5 March 1995	7 May 1995
5	7	7 January 1996	25 February 1996
6	7	18 May 1997	29 June 1997
7	7	19 April 1998	31 May 1998
8	6	30 July 2000	1 September 2000
9	5	7 July 2002	11 August 2002
10	2	26 December 2005	30 December 2005

== Episodes ==
=== Series 1 (1992) ===
No. overall	No. in series	Title	Directed by	Written by	Original release date
1	1	"You Must Remember This"	Sydney Lotterby	Bob Larbey	12 January 1992
We meet Lionel in the hotel he stays at while making changes to his book (the secretarial agency won't send female secretaries to single men's homes). Jean's daughter and employee, Judith Hanson (Moira Brooker), is sent over to placate him and apologise after the agency initially provided a sub-par secretary. Judith quite likes Lionel and the two go out to dinner, but while picking Judith up at home (where she lives with her Mum) he recognises Judith's mother Jean Pargetter, the boss of Type for You, and old memories are stirred up. When Judith returns, Jean tells her that she and Lionel were in love 38 years ago, but when he was sent to Korea on National Service he never wrote to her. The following day, Lionel tells Judith that he wrote, but Jean never replied. When they finally meet at the hotel Lionel is staying at to sort out what went wrong in the communications department all those years ago, they discover that Lionel's letter simply got lost in the post, though Lionel did not write again and Jean did not have an address for him. They agree to call each other sometime. Guest starring Cheryl Hall.
2	2	"Getting To Know You – Again"	Sydney Lotterby	Bob Larbey	19 January 1992
Lionel doesn't call Jean and decides to leave the hotel before another secretary is sent round but, as he is leaving his publisher Alistair Deacon (Philip Bretherton) arrives and persuades him to continue with the revisions to his book My Life in Kenya. Meanwhile, Sandy, Jean's secretary at Type for You, arrives to work for Lionel but is told he has checked out. When Lionel finds this out, he goes to see Jean and they then agree not to see each other again. But, very shortly afterwards Lionel invites Jean to go to a party being held by Alistair that evening after he confesses to getting cold feet because Judith is trying to fire up the sparks of romance between her Mum and Lionel. Jean agrees to attend the party. Both feel very out of place with all of the young people, and Alistair tries to clumsily seduce Jean. Guest starring Cheryl Hall, Roy Heather and Mark Tandy. Note: First appearance of Alistair (Philip Bretherton).
3	3	"The Copper Kettle"	Sydney Lotterby	Bob Larbey	26 January 1992
After visiting Jean to tell her he is going to Norwich, Lionel joins her and Judith when they go out to dinner. Judith leaves early to give them time together. The following day they go to Buckinghamshire, where they spent time when they first dated in 1953, only to find that everything has changed. All Lionel's plans go wrong as the two stumble blindly round the countryside. They come across a familiar hotel called The Copper Kettle, where as youths they first made love. On a whim they decide to stay the night, but they both soon back out of the idea.
4	4	"Surprise, Surprise"	Sydney Lotterby	Bob Larbey	2 February 1992
Jean and Judith travel to Norwich to surprise Lionel as he gives a lecture about his life in Kenya. On the train, they are joined by Alistair who spends the whole journey chatting Jean up. Lionel stays with a "friend" called Denise Cropper, and Jean is not impressed when they surprise Lionel before the lecture. The lecture is disrupted by students who think Lionel killed elephants. After dinner, Jean goes for a drink with Alistair, Judith has a drink with the Master of the College (played by Paul Rogers) and Lionel goes back to Denise's. However, after having an argument he leaves. Guest starring Karl Collins and Jean Warren.
5	5	"Relationships"	Sydney Lotterby	Bob Larbey	9 February 1992
Alistair tells Lionel that My Life in Kenya needs "humanising" since his descriptions of people are too matter-of-fact, so Lionel checks back into the hotel and goes to see Jean for some secretarial assistance. Sandy agrees to work for him, but Lionel has problems doing what Alistair wants him to do, so Jean invites him round one evening so she can help. After Lionel gives a slightly depressed Judith a bit of confidence, she falls for him and Alistair sends flowers and chocolates to Jean. Meanwhile, Type for You gets a second branch in Brompton Road.
6	6	"The Picnic"	Sydney Lotterby	Bob Larbey	16 February 1992
Alistair sends a band to Jean's at 8am and later sends her a gorillagram. Judith insists that she, not Sandy, go to the hotel to be Lionel's secretary but tells Lionel that Sandy is ill. When Lionel discovers that Judith fancies him, he tells Jean that he feels uncomfortable. Both Lionel and Jean are a little flattered by the attention of the younger people, although they deny it to each other. Jean, Lionel, Judith and Alistair go on a picnic together as a group. Both Lionel and Jean find they aren't as young as they used to be and end up asleep on the grass. They form a plan to make Judith and Alistair fall for each other. After the picnic Judith and Alistair are sent on a walk together. Meanwhile, Jean and Lionel agree that they're glad to be back in each other's lives, and end the episode with a kiss.

=== Series 2 (1993) ===
No. overall	No. in series	Title	Directed by	Written by	Original release date
7	1	"White Hunter"	Sydney Lotterby	Bob Larbey	10 January 1993
Alistair decides that the front cover of My Life in Kenya will be a photograph of Lionel. Lionel is nervous about the photo shoot and asks Jean to come with him. Initially she does not as she is expecting an important client, but she later decides to leave Judy, who is now over Lionel, and Sandy to deal with the client and goes to give Lionel support. At the photo shoot, Lionel is dressed as a white hunter holding a rifle with a young woman at his side. He gets annoyed when Jean laughs, but when they get back to the office, Judy tells Lionel that Jean lost thousands of pounds of business because she missed the client.
8	2	"A Weekend Away"	Sydney Lotterby	Bob Larbey	17 January 1993
Judy tells Jean she is going away for the weekend, but refuses to say where or who with. Later, when Alistair tells Lionel he is going to Paris for the weekend, Jean thinks that he must be going with Judy, who refuses to confirm or deny it. Over a "working breakfast", Lionel is shown a dummy copy of My Life in Kenya that is to be published in three weeks. After both Judy and Sandy encourage Jean to have time alone with Lionel while Judy is away, Jean does the opposite on the Friday and tells Lionel she is busy all weekend. The following day, after seeing Alistair, who did not go to Paris after all, Lionel goes round to Jean's house. However, Judy returns home early and tells them that she went to Pangbourne on her own to give Jean and Lionel time alone.
9	3	"Visiting Rocky"	Sydney Lotterby	Bob Larbey	24 January 1993
Lionel gets depressed about what he can no longer do after he and Jean go boating. The following day, Lionel takes Jean down to Hampshire to meet his 85-year-old father, known as Rocky. His father tells them he is going to marry 78-year-old Madge, and he asks Jean to be a bridesmaid. They also meet his housekeeper, Mrs Bale. As they leave, Lionel's father tells him to marry Jean. When Lionel later tells Jean this they both decide they are "too set" to get married. Note: First appearance of Rocky (Frank Middlemass).
10	4	"Why?"	Sydney Lotterby	Bob Larbey	31 January 1993
Lionel has problems when trying to buy a new suit for the book launch. He later wonders why a successful publisher like Alistair is spending so much time personally on helping Lionel. After asking him twice, Alistair eventually tells him that in 1947 Lionel's father lent his father £500 to start a publishing firm and Alistair is returning the favour. Also, Lionel explains to Jean that he needs the money from the book sales as the money he earned in Kenya can only be spent in Kenya; and Judy spends the night with Alistair.
11	5	"Misunderstandings"	Sydney Lotterby	Bob Larbey	7 February 1993
While in a record shop, Lionel and Jean bump into Jean's sister-in-law Penny. They then have tea at Jean's house, and Jean tells Penny that she and Lionel have only known each other a few months. That weekend, Jean and Lionel stay with Penny and husband Stephen. When Penny starts talking about the years after Jean's husband died, Jean tells them that Lionel is a psychiatrist to change the subject. Later when Penny calls their relationship "companionship", Jean leads her to believe that she and Lionel sleep together, which then means they are given a double bed to share.
12	6	"The Cruise"	Sydney Lotterby	Bob Larbey	14 February 1993
When they return from Penny's, Lionel realises he has left his watch behind and rings Penny to ask her to look for it. When Penny rings back, she speaks to Judy and tells her that Jean and Lionel shared a bed. Meanwhile, Lionel is offered a cruise where he will deliver a lecture on My Life in Kenya, but Jean is not flattered when he says she can come along for free. Alistair suggests that for the sake of the book, Jean does not accompany Lionel when going to book signing and other public appearances, but Lionel soon rubbishes the idea. Guest starring Dean Harris.
13	7	"The Book Signing"	Sydney Lotterby	Bob Larbey	21 February 1993
Lionel signs copies of My Life in Kenya at Waterstone's in London and Alistair has "stacked" the queue with people paid to ask him to sign the book. Meanwhile, Jean, Judy and Sandy ring everyone they know to tell them to buy the book and Jean buys 140 copies personally. Later, Lionel tours Britain to promote the book. After reading the inscription in the book, which read "To Pooh", Alistair correctly guesses that refers to Jean (Pooh as in Winnie-the-Pooh, as when they first met Jean liked honey) and then suggests that they make a story out about this mystery woman. When Lionel finds out, he destroys the idea and then tells Jean he has booked them two tickets to Paris.

=== Series 3 (1994) ===
No. overall	No. in series	Title	Directed by	Written by	Original release date
14	1	"We'll Always Have Paris"	Sydney Lotterby	Bob Larbey	2 January 1994
Jean and Lionel are in Paris. After returning from a walk, Jean befriends Ann (played by Jessica Lloyd), an English woman whose husband Terry (Sam West) has walked out on her on their honeymoon after they had an argument when he made an "unreasonable demand" during the night. During Ann's talk with Jean, Lionel goes off to make a phone call, app. to get out of the "line of fire". Jean then goes to lunch with Ann, while Lionel by accident meets Terry in the hotel bar. Terry then gets drunk, so Lionel takes him to his and Jean's room to sleep. When Jean returns, there is quite a lively quarrel. Later, when Ann goes to Jean and Lionel's room to say she is leaving she sees Terry, who was getting ready to see her, getting changed and gets the wrong idea. Jean then leaves them to make up while Lionel tells Jean that the "unreasonable demand" was asking Ann to open a window. Lionel then tells Jean about the phone call he made earlier, and Jean is delighted.
15	2	"Rocky's Wedding Day"	Sydney Lotterby	Bob Larbey	9 January 1994
Lionel, Jean, Judy and Alistair gather to take Sandy, who has just split from her boyfriend Nick, out to dinner at Simpson's. However, when Lionel's father Rocky arrives (he had come to London to see his "quack") he insists they go to the Hard Rock Cafe instead and then invites Judy, Sandy and Alistair to his wedding. On the wedding day, the best man Mr Fishwick injures himself so Lionel becomes best man which means Alistair has to give Madge away, while Jean and Mrs Bale are bridesmaids.This all strikes Lionel as more than a bit odd. At the reception, Jean gets annoyed with Lionel for being so miserable. Shortly after Lionel gets a phone call from his father's doctor. Lionel then gives a very good best man's speech, instead of telling a joke about a parrot (Jean says the joke is not funny and needs burial). After Rocky and Madge depart, Lionel tells Jean that Rocky's doctor told him that Rocky will be lucky if he lives another year, hence the speech. On the way home Nick apologises to Sandy and they go off on his motorbike while Jean and Lionel agree to live together. Note: First appearance of Madge (Joan Sims).
16	3	"Living Together, But Where?"	Sydney Lotterby	Bob Larbey	16 January 1994
The day after Rocky's wedding, Lionel and Jean agree to move in together at noon the following day. However, both think the other is moving into the other's home. The following day, when Judy and Alistair realise this, they try to find Lionel and Jean, but both have gone looking for the other which means neither is at home when the other arrives. Lionel then gets taken in by the Metropolitan Police Service for looking suspicious outside Jean's house. After Jean goes to the police station to vouch for him, they go back to Jean's and talk. While they want to live together, both want the other to move and they cannot come to an agreement.
17	4	"Covering Up"	Sydney Lotterby	Bob Larbey	23 January 1994
When Penny rings, Jean tells her that she and Lionel are getting on like a "house on fire", but actually they are not talking following the argument about where to live. Judy goes to Lionel's and persuades him to go to Jean's when Penny and Stephen will be there to pretend everything is fine. However, when Judy rings Jean to tell her this, Alistair's car phone cuts off, so when Penny and Stephen arrive Jean tells them Lionel is in hospital with a broken ankle. When Lionel then arrives, he puts on a limp. Jean soon panics and gets rid of Penny and Stephen by pretending she has a judo class and they arrange to meet the following day, and Jean says that Stephen may see Lionel, who he thinks is a psychiatrist. Stephen confesses to having fantasies about his dental nurse Miss Breeze. When they all meet in the evening, Jean tells Penny the truth about when she and Lionel first met and Lionel then says he will move in with Jean.
18	5	"Moving In"	Sydney Lotterby	Bob Larbey	30 January 1994
With Alistair and Sandy's help, Lionel moves to live with Jean. The girls lament that Lionel has left most of his belongings behind. While unpacking, Jean insists on removing her bedside photo of David, her first husband, but Lionel says she should not. Alistair meets Lionel in the pub and talks about Lionel writing a TV mini-series on his and Jean's romance, but he dismisses the idea. Alistair then suggests that he take Jean to dinner at "The Caffe", an exclusive restaurant he knows, and Alistair then books them a table. However, again being unreasonable, Jean has already started cooking a special meal, and after an argument Lionel cancels the table. Later they end up eating at a fish and chips restaurant when Jean's cooking goes wrong.
19	6	"Branching Out"	Sydney Lotterby	Bob Larbey	6 February 1994
Jean opens the second Type for You branch, and needs a manager to run it. Meanwhile, Alistair offers Sandy a tempting job as his PA. Judy expects to be chosen as the new manager, but Jean has to tell her that she is not up to the job. Jean then offers the job to Sandy, who then tells her of Alistair's job offer. Jean then goes to see Alistair about this. Alistair tells Jean of his idea that Lionel should write a TV mini-series. Later, after Sandy and Judy have talked, Sandy turns down the job of branch manager but opts to stay at Type for You. Jean tries to persuade Lionel to write the mini-series while Alistair leaves for America to discuss the idea with a TV company.
20	7	"The Mini-Series"	Sydney Lotterby	Bob Larbey	13 February 1994
Alistair arrives in the middle of the night with news from America: he has got CBS interested in the miniseries idea and needs Lionel to write a treatment in two days. The next morning, Jean interviews Sally Curtis as a prospective manager for the second branch of Type for You. However, Jean can't seem to get the right authoritative tone for the interview as she arrives late with a broken shoe and ends up getting picky over everything—including Sally's CV. At the same time, Lionel is struggling to come up with the treatment. Tuesday morning he finally finishes and takes the treatment to Jean's office to get copies made but manages to shred his work instead. In a last-ditch attempt to save the miniseries, Lionel and Jean meet the CBS representative, Mike Barbosa, and verbally pitch the show. Mike loves it and rushes off to fax his superior: Cy Lieberman.
21	8	"A Trip to Los Angeles"	Sydney Lotterby	Bob Larbey	20 February 1994
Jean and Lionel arrive in Los Angeles to continue work on the miniseries idea, but friction between Lionel and the television executives causes Jean to call in reinforcements: Alistair. Arriving just in time for the meeting the next day, Alistair encourages Lionel to just agree with whatever Cy says. In the meeting, the television executives have some creative suggestions for Lionel which destroy the essential concept of the story. Still, Lionel follows Alistair's advice and agrees to the changes only to have Jean break into a rant. The conflict is cut short, however, when a disgruntled writer breaks in to kill Cy for canceling his series. The gunman orders everyone on the floor, but Jean refuses because she is wearing a new dress. This annoys Lionel who then disarms the gunman. Later, Jean and Lionel find out that the miniseries has been green lighted due to Jean's honesty and Lionel saving Cy Lieberman.
22	9	"Dealing with Sally"	Sydney Lotterby	Bob Larbey	27 February 1994
Jean and Lionel return from Los Angeles. Lionel copes with anticipated jet lag by heading directly to bed. Whereas Jean heads in to work where she gets an earful from Sandy and Judy about Sally, the manager of the second branch, whom they have nicknamed 'Miss Ice-Cubes'. Angered, Jean rushes to confront Sally, but the effects of jet lag force her to retreat home. Alistair, meanwhile, informs Lionel that he needs secretarial help to get started on the miniseries. Lionel agrees, going to Type For You to engage one, but—as all the staff are currently assigned – he has to go to Sally's branch. Later, in bed, Jean asks for Lionel's opinion about Sally, but doesn't hear what she wants. The next morning, Judy informs Jean that Lionel is right: they are jealous of Sally. She adds that they should just let it go. Jean agrees – at least until she sees the very attractive young secretary Sally has assigned to Lionel.
23	10	"Problems, Problems"	Sydney Lotterby	Bob Larbey	6 March 1994
Jealous, Jean has Lionel's secretary inadvertently fired and gets a replacement, a Mrs Gwen Flack, a kindly but rather scatterbrained middle-aged widow who tends to get distracted on personal anecdotes – slowing work. When a family emergency interrupts, Lionel eagerly flees to the hospital where Rocky and Madge are making a bit of a nuisance of themselves. Judy and Sandy later arrive to entertain, but get thrown out by the nurse for being "too rowdy". Mrs Bale, upset by Rocky and Madge's accident, gets tipsy on Tequila Sunrise. Eventually, Jean and Lionel return home to find that Mrs Flack, whom Lionel forgot earlier, is still there, sound asleep. After sending her home, Lionel admits that he will have to keep her now as she was so dedicated to her post.

=== Series 4 (1995) ===
No. overall	No. in series	Title	Directed by	Written by	Original release date
24	1	"A House Full of Women"	Sydney Lotterby	Bob Larbey	5 March 1995
After a fight with her boyfriend, Sandy comes to move in with Lionel, Jean, and Judith. Meanwhile Lionel feels put out, as the spare bedroom that was to become his study will now be used by Sandy.
25	2	"Rewrites"	Sydney Lotterby	Bob Larbey	12 March 1995
As Lionel's difficulties with Mrs Flack continue, Jean meets with Daisy—Lionel's former secretary that she inadvertently had Sally fire. Alistair confronts Lionel with a request for a more steamy scene for the mini-series. While at the house, Alistair learns that Sandy has moved in while she and Judith look for a flat together. He tries to talk Judith out of it. Later, it's discovered that Mrs Flack is tidying the house—including Judith and Sandy's clothes—without permission, and it's decided that she must be let go. Alas, Mrs Flack arrives promptly the next morning on crutches, and, again they do not have the heart to fire her ...
26	3	"Getting Rid of Gwen"	Sydney Lotterby	Bob Larbey	19 March 1995
Lionel and Mrs Flack attempt to rewrite the intimate scene for the mini-series but Mrs Flack keeps side-tracking the work. Jean returns home with a plan to get rid of Mrs Flack that depends on her attachment to her pet Yorkshire Terrier, Herriot, but luckily Mrs Flack quits first, having received an invitation to help a relative. Lionel almost ruins everything. Also, Alistair asks Judith to move in with him, but she rejects him because "it isn't enough".
27	4	"The Affair"	Sydney Lotterby	Bob Larbey	26 March 1995
Penny comes to London after she leaves Stephen because he is having an affair with his nurse, Miss Breeze. In a talk with Lionel, Stephen confesses that he is not having an affair; in fact, he is planning a surprise 25th anniversary party for Penny. He does not tell Penny the truth about the "affair" in order to keep the party a secret. Daisy returns as Lionel's secretary.
28	5	"Welcome News"	Sydney Lotterby	Bob Larbey	2 April 1995
Mike Barbosa flies in to see Lionel about fine-tuning the script and wants to see Rocky's house as a possible location for filming part of the mini-series. Mike loves the house; furthermore, he wants Mrs Bale to play Lionel's nanny in the film which surprises Lionel as his script doesn't have any childhood scenes. Mrs Bale is astounded and impressed that Mike describes her face as "Plantagenet", but turns down Mike's offer of a part in the film. After Mike and Alistair leave, Rocky and Madge reveal their intention to give Lionel the house. Now with something substantial to offer her, Lionel proposes to Jean.
29	6	"The Anniversary Party"	Sydney Lotterby	Bob Larbey	9 April 1995
Penny and Stephen's 25th wedding anniversary party has arrived. Problem is, Stephen has invited the guests for one night and booked the party for another, 7 days later. So, though Penny is suitably surprised, they have no place to celebrate or spend the night. Alistair manages to step in and save the day. Lionel and Jean are surprised at the number of marriages that are on the rocks, even as people are celebrating Penny and Stephen achieving their 25th anniversary.
30	7	"Wedding Preparations"	Sydney Lotterby	Bob Larbey	16 April 1995
As Lionel puts the final touches on the mini-series, Jean is in the midst of wedding preparations. While shopping for the perfect dress she manages to be accused of shoplifting. Preparations become awkward with Lionel losing his temper with the curtains and the girls not being expert on weeding the garden. Alistair proves a great help.
31	8	"Wedding Day Nerves"	Sydney Lotterby	Bob Larbey	23 April 1995
Lionel and Jean's wedding day arrives. Lionel finds himself dealing with a case of nerves, while Jean has to deal with Penny's meddling. Meanwhile, Rocky and Madge are missing in somewhere in Chiswick and it's up to Kong, Alistair's biker friend, to find them in time for the nuptials.
32	9	"Judith's New Romance"	Sydney Lotterby	Bob Larbey	30 April 1995
Jean and Lionel return from their honeymoon to discover that Judy has a new love interest, a bookshop owner, Eric, who is rather dull. Meanwhile, Sandy feels as though there are one too many women in the house.
33	10	"Improvements?"	Sydney Lotterby	Bob Larbey	7 May 1995
The family goes to the Hampshire house to watch Lionel's mini series being filmed. He is shocked and displeased by the directors choice of actors and their costumes, as well as the number and extent of the rewrites of his script. They also have to deal with the unpleasant director. Jean considers retirement.

=== Series 5 (1996) ===
No. overall	No. in series	Title	Directed by	Written by	Original release date
34	1	"The County Set"	Sydney Lotterby	Bob Larbey	7 January 1996
Lionel and Jean decide to have a quiet weekend away together at Rocky's country retreat, when Rocky and Madge go away to Mongolia. They are constantly disturbed with a steady stream of visitors, which include a very lively group of locals who insist on doing everything together. Jean and Lionel begin to feel overwhelmed and wonder if their weekend getaways will be as quiet as they've hoped. Just when they think it can get no worse, Penny and Stephen arrive without any warning - but are dealt with after a little subterfuge on the part of Mrs Bale.
35	2	"Lionel's Ex-Wife"	Sydney Lotterby	Bob Larbey	14 January 1996
Lionel receives an unexpected letter from his ex-wife, Margaret, who wants to meet. Lionel asks Jean to go along while reassuring her she does not have to 'dress to impress' because his ex-wife was always very plain and boring. Margaret arrives smartly dressed, dripping in diamonds and with a toyboy. Meanwhile, Jean is concerned about the threesome dating occurring between Alistair, Judith and Sandy, and asks Lionel to quiz Alistair.
36	3	"Lionel's New Hobby"	Sydney Lotterby	Bob Larbey	21 January 1996
In search of something to fill his time, Lionel takes up model-making but is quickly confounded by the tiny pieces of the ship he has chosen to build. Alistair tries to help, asking Lionel to adapt an obscure book (opening line: "I am alone with my sheep") for film or television. Sandy goes out with Alistair, and to his annoyance spends the evening discussing Judith's good points. Home from Alistair's, Sandy and Judith discuss the situation, agree Judith's relationship with Alistair is on, or off, depending... and finish Lionel's (impossible) model ship.
37	4	"Avoiding The County Set"	Sydney Lotterby	Bob Larbey	4 February 1996
During another disturbed weekend in the country (despite arriving at 4 A.M. to avoid the 'gang'), Lionel and Jean are invited against their better judgement to attend a barbecue, where they find out one of them had their gardener, Lol Ferris, beaten up after a disagreement. Lionel coolly tells the 'gang' that they are not going to be part of their group, leaving them spluttering with rage. Rocky and Madge return from Mongolia and congratulate Lionel and Jean for putting the 'yahoos' in their place. Note: First appearance of Lol (Tim Wylton).
38	5	"Broadcast Plans"	Sydney Lotterby	Bob Larbey	11 February 1996
Lionel's mini-series "Just Two People" is set to air in America. Alistair shows up with a plan to take them to New York via Concorde and a stay at a fancy hotel. They decline, but Judy and Sandy take the trip instead and anxiously await the show. As feared and expected, the meddling of the script writers has resulted in a disaster and viewing figures trail off sharply during transmission, resulting in its cancellation. Alistair blames himself, and on their return to England tries to avoid the family altogether, until after a chance encounter in the street they assure him it was not his fault.
39	6	"At Death's Door"	Sydney Lotterby	Bob Larbey	18 February 1996
When Penny needs minor surgery, she claims to be at death's door. Stephen stays with Jean and family while Penny is in the hospital. Things are made more unsettled by Penny's premonition and an addled room-mate who claims Jean is Cilla Black. After Penny is discharged, Jean gives her a piece of her mind for getting everybody worked up over nothing. Lionel once again tells the joke about the parrot that nobody gets, but nothing is heard of it except the 'punch' line.
40	7	"Showered With Gifts"	Sydney Lotterby	Bob Larbey	25 February 1996
After they have told off the "County Set", Jean and Lionel are showered with gifts from the locals who have heard an exaggerated story of what really happened, the most extravagant being that Lionel is a recipient of the Victoria Cross. Alistair suggests a way of using the house for Lionel to make money and Lionel discusses the issue with Rocky. Sandy is asked out by all the Ferris brothers and has a fun night with the whole crew at the local pub, "The Stag and Huntsmen" where the drinks run freely and Madge sings country and western songs all night. Lionel and Jean leave early - and, on their way out, have to deal with an even more exaggerated rumour about "violence" with the "County Set".

=== Series 6 (1997) ===
No. overall	No. in series	Title	Directed by	Written by	Original release date
41	1	"The Stalker"	Sydney Lotterby	Bob Larbey	18 May 1997
Sandy suspects that she was followed while walking home at night and Lionel rushes outside to find the stalker. The girls fear for Lionel's safety, but he insists he was fine. Alistair gets wind of the situation and calls in a thug named "Nails", who suddenly makes Jean fear for the safety of the stalker. Late one night when Judy and Sandy are walking home, Jean and Lionel go out to stop Nails from getting carried away. They catch the stalker, who is revealed as merely a teenage boy with a crush on Sandy. This episode is made unpleasant by a stallkeeper in the market who gets nasty when he thinks Lionel is a shoplifter, and is only placated when Lionel pays him for an antique bugle he was looking at but did not want.
42	2	"The Psychotherapist"	Sydney Lotterby	Bob Larbey	25 May 1997
Jean's behavior of taking on unnecessary work from the secretarial agency worries Judy and Sandy. We also see that Jean is secretly seeing a psychotherapist. Eventually she reveals this to Lionel and says that she's concerned about retiring from work. Lionel becomes upset and argues that she's treating work as more important than him. Jean sees his point, finally committing to retire.
43	3	"The Dinner Party"	Sydney Lotterby	Bob Larbey	1 June 1997
Penny and Stephen meet Jean and Lionel in London for dinner. To avoid the topic of Jean's retirement, they keep Stephen the centre of the discussion the entire evening. This is fairly easy as Stephen is eager to talk at length on many trivial subjects. Penny figures this out the next day and confronts Jean, who apologises for their dishonesty. Yet when Jean reveals the truth – that she saw a psychotherapist, that Sandy recently dumped a pervert, and that Judy is seeing a married man – Penny doesn't believe her!
44	4	"What's Wrong With Mrs Bale?"	Sydney Lotterby	Bob Larbey	8 June 1997
Jean and Lionel go to Hampshire and see Rocky and Madge, but find that Mrs Bale is acting "distinctly peculiar". They unsuccessfully try to find what's troubling her while staying discreet, but this fails. Lionel intends to ask her after dinner, but he becomes ill from some local "bug" going around and takes an early night. The next day Jean calls in the local doctor, who they find has the bedside manner of a "mortuary attendant". As Lionel complains about him it becomes apparent that the doctor sparked Mrs Bale's mood by commenting on her age.
45	5	"Alistair's Engagement"	Sydney Lotterby	Bob Larbey	15 June 1997
Alistair announces to Jean, Lionel, Judy, and Sandy that he's engaged to marry a girl called Mercury, which shocks everyone, especially Judy. They all plan to meet the engaged couple at a restaurant, but Judy's latest boyfriend, Paul, a sports journalist who is separated from his wife, stands her up after having lied to her about a non-existent work assignment. Just then a very tall striking-looking girl walks past and they assume this is Alistair's fiancee, at the moment that he arrives alone claiming that he has been dumped. Lionel quietly deduces that this was actually another of Alistair's attempts to win back Judy, and that 'Mercury' never existed.
46	6	"The House Next Door"	Sydney Lotterby	Bob Larbey	22 June 1997
Lionel, Jean, Judy, and Sandy hear sounds from the unoccupied townhouse next door. Fearing a criminal, they call the police. They then learn that it was just the former neighbor cleaning up. When the policeman arrives, Jean asks Sandy to explain the mistake. The policeman (Harry) asks Sandy for a date and she agrees. Penny and Stephen are considering moving into the house next door to Jean and Lionel, who are horrified by the idea and try to dissuade Penny. Alistair cooks up a plan to outbid them and later sell the house privately, but Jean and Lionel nix the idea because it's deceptive. Stephen, who actually doesn't want to move, covertly phones in a higher bid under a false name. Alistair buys the house anyway because Stephen's fake bid became the highest. Note: First appearance of Harry (David Michaels).
47	7	"A Surprise for Jean"	Sydney Lotterby	Bob Larbey	29 June 1997
Jean suggests that she's bored and Lionel, thanks to assistance from Alistair, Judy, and Sandy, arranges a surprise holiday to a villa in Barbados although it doesn't quite go to plan. Lionel also finds the letter he sent to Jean from Korea, the one that got lost in the post, on display in the Imperial War Museum. The episode ends with an extended portion of the theme song playing as Jean at long last reads the letter.

=== Series 7 (1998) ===
No. overall	No. in series	Title	Directed by	Written by	Original release date
48	1	"Pardon?"	Sydney Lotterby	Bob Larbey	19 April 1998
Lionel becomes hard of hearing, but no one wants to tell him, and the job is left up to Alistair who gets under Lionel's skin. Meanwhile, Jean must cope with the difficulty she is having with her eyesight.
49	2	"An Old Flame"	Sydney Lotterby	Bob Larbey	26 April 1998
Jean gets a call from an old male friend who has contacted her after seeing an advertisement for her business in the local paper. He invites her out for dinner for old times' sake, but he turns out to have changed a good deal from the lively young man she remembered and evidently has a drink problem. Meanwhile she and Lionel take a parental interest in Harry, Sandy's policeman boyfriend, and question his character.
50	3	"The New Neighbours"	Sydney Lotterby	Bob Larbey	3 May 1998
Jean wants to know who has moved in next door, and amuses her family with her efforts as a spy.
51	4	"The Bypass"	Sydney Lotterby	Bob Larbey	10 May 1998
Jean and the girls get involved in a local country protest over a new bypass route near the home of Lionel's father, and immediately take sides. Lionel wants to remain neutral. Further inquiry leads to details Jean has overlooked, and gives her quite a surprise, especially when she discovers that the locals welcome the idea of a bypass because it will make the town much quieter.
52	5	"Too Old ... Or Too Nosy?"	Sydney Lotterby	Bob Larbey	17 May 1998
Jean's brother-in-law, Stephen and his wife Penny are expected for another visit. As they are considered rather dull, it is most surprising that they arrive via separate modes of transportation to announce that they are having issues over something Stephen has said. (Ms Breeze, Stephen's assistant, is retiring and Penny wants to be her replacement. Stephen is down on the idea, but does not tell his wife why.)
53	6	"The Old Folks' Party"	Sydney Lotterby	Bob Larbey	24 May 1998
Jean, Lionel, Alistair, Judith, Sandy and Rocky put on a show and party at the local church hall for the Old Folks, at which they have to deal with one of the guests who is determined to be miserable. Alastair, who has borrowed some equipment from a friend in order to run the disco, has the perfect solution. Note: Final appearance of Madge Hardcastle (Joan Sims).
54	7	"The Proposal"	Sydney Lotterby	Bob Larbey	31 May 1998
Jean is anxious to bring Sandy and Harry together again, after a row over Harry's passion for sport. The Duncans abruptly vacate the dwelling next door, and Judith suggests that she and Alistair should buy it and move in. Lionel has his reservations, but they are nothing compared to the reaction of a furious Judith when Alistair, startled by the appearance of an old college friend at a recent rendezvous, proposes marriage to her for the wrong reason.

=== Series 8 (2000) ===
No. overall	No. in series	Title	Directed by	Written by	Original release date	Viewers (millions)
55	1	"A Deeply Personal Problem"	Sydney Lotterby	Bob Larbey	30 July 2000	5.42
Alistair asks Lionel if he wants to sign books in Tokyo; but then Judy comes in, who recently broke off her engagement to Alistair, and suspects Jean is trying to get them back together. Jean explains Alistair's presence by saying Lionel has a deeply personal problem. The girls try to work out what is wrong with him, eventually turning it into a fiasco.
56	2	"Animal Magnetism"	Sydney Lotterby	Bob Larbey	6 August 2000	5.78
Lionel is followed home by a dog, and the rest of the family desperately want to keep him, but he is soon reclaimed by his rightful owner. Judy turns down Alistair's offer of a prestigious evening out and Sandy accepts, much to the annoyance of Harry, who is at a loose end and then persuaded to take Judy out to a film, an offer she accepts - and then finds out it is about baseball.
57	3	"The Bathroom"	Sydney Lotterby	Bob Larbey	13 August 2000	6.69
After Lionel accidentally walks in on Sandy in the bath, Jean blames Sandy for leaving the door unlocked, but decides they must have a second bathroom. Sandy wonders if she should leave. The second bathroom plan proves more expensive than Jean had anticipated - quite apart from the little but overlooked matter of planning permission.
58	4	"Surprising News"	Sydney Lotterby	Bob Larbey	20 August 2000	6.47
Penny and Stephen announce big plans to retire in Spain. Lionel frets over not having a pension plan of his own.
59	5	"Future Imperfect"	Sydney Lotterby	Bob Larbey	27 August 2000	5.87
Lionel is still worried about his financial future and Alistair suggests he sell the country house. Lionel and Jean decide that they should sell the house, but who is going to tell Mrs Bale and Lol that they are out of jobs? Lionel and Jean go to the country to inform everyone of their decision, and Rocky eventually calls and offers to buy the house from Lionel so everything can remain the same.
60	6	"Going Online"	Sydney Lotterby	Bob Larbey	1 September 2000	<4.88
Jean wants to stay up-to-date, so they hook up to the internet. Alistair is close to bankruptcy – well, down to his last million, at least.

=== Series 9 (2002) ===
No. overall	No. in series	Title	Directed by	Written by	Original release date	Viewers (millions)
61	1	"Time to Settle Down"	Sydney Lotterby	Bob Larbey	7 July 2002	5.78
With Alistair finally becoming a realistic man (with substance instead of flash and glam), Judith accepts Alistair’s proposal of marriage, the last of several, during a scene in which, in front of Judith, Jean and Lionel, he dramatically stamps on his mobile phone in order to destroy it and threatens to set fire to a sheaf of money-spinning contracts from overseas before Judith restrains him. Meanwhile Harry reappears, having been promoted in the police force and offered the chance of being posted to Canada.
62	2	"Another Proposal"	Sydney Lotterby	Bob Larbey	14 July 2002	5.76
Wedding plans progress for Judith and Alistair's big day, which Jean initially assumes will be at home until Judith says that if Rocky agrees, she would much rather have it in Hampshire with the reception at his house. To her horror, Alistair immediately starts to make plans for a grand ceremony, aided and abetted by Rocky ("The Manic Street Preachers!" he suggests; "The who?" asks a puzzled Lionel; "No, they've disbanded!" Rocky tells him), perhaps even including the London Symphony Orchestra, until Lionel quietly persuades him that Judith only wants a quiet wedding. Meanwhile, Alistair has been struck by panic attacks with occasional fainting. Stephen announces that he may receive an OBE for services to dentistry, and Penny has visions of a grand social life which may cause them to miss the wedding.
63	3	"The Wedding"	Sydney Lotterby	Bob Larbey	21 July 2002	5.45
Judith and Alistair’s wedding day is a success, despite the side-effects of Alistair's medication for the panic attacks – tearful displays of emotion – his best man Gaston (a ski instructor who 'tends to be over excitable') having to cancel after breaking his leg, and Stephen accidentally refusing his OBE due to a misunderstanding with the forms he was sent. Jean's efforts to get Sandy (bridesmaid) and Harry (guest) together again at the reception are a partial success, and at the end they are seen on the sofa holding hands together, Harry having passed out after having too much champagne pressed upon him by everyone. Note: Final appearance of Lol (Tim Wylton).
64	4	"What Now?"	Sydney Lotterby	Bob Larbey	4 August 2002	7.05
With Judith and Alistair married and making a brief appearance so he can carry her across the threshold, Jean and Lionel contemplate "What now?" while helping out a homeless girl named Dave, despite a wary Lionel's grave misgivings. Harry proposes to Sandy just before he is scheduled to leave for Canada. At the last moment he realises that he only has a ticket for himself but not for Sandy, but as ever, a quick phone call from Alistair to the right person saves the day.
65	5	"You Must Remember This…"	Sydney Lotterby	Bob Larbey	11 August 2002	6.98
The special takes the form of a clip show, with a newly shot frame story of Jean and Lionel reflecting on the events depicted in the clips. Note: This special was double-length at 60 minutes.

=== Series 10 / Reunion Specials (2005) ===
No. overall	No. in series	Title	Directed by	Written by	Original release date	Viewers (millions)
66	1	"Reunion Special Part One"	Sydney Lotterby	Bob Larbey	26 December 2005	4.87
Jean is anxious for grandchildren, Judy and Alistair find they're having trouble conceiving, Sandy and Harry move back to London from Canada, and Jean meets Lionel's "son", Patrick, from Kenya. Guest starring David Oyelowo.
67	2	"Reunion Special Part Two"	Sydney Lotterby	Bob Larbey	30 December 2005	6.22
Judy and Sandy play a trick on the strait-laced Penny and Stephen. The entire extended family winds up at the A&E when Rocky is injured line dancing and Stephen's quest to become a celebrity results in injuries for himself and Penny.

In December 2020, when rebroadcasting the series, UKTV spilt the 2 specials from 2005 into 4 episodes airing them as 'Christmas Specials series 10'. A 'last time' and 'next time' compilation was added at the start and end of each episode.
