= Chris Pavlo =

British actor

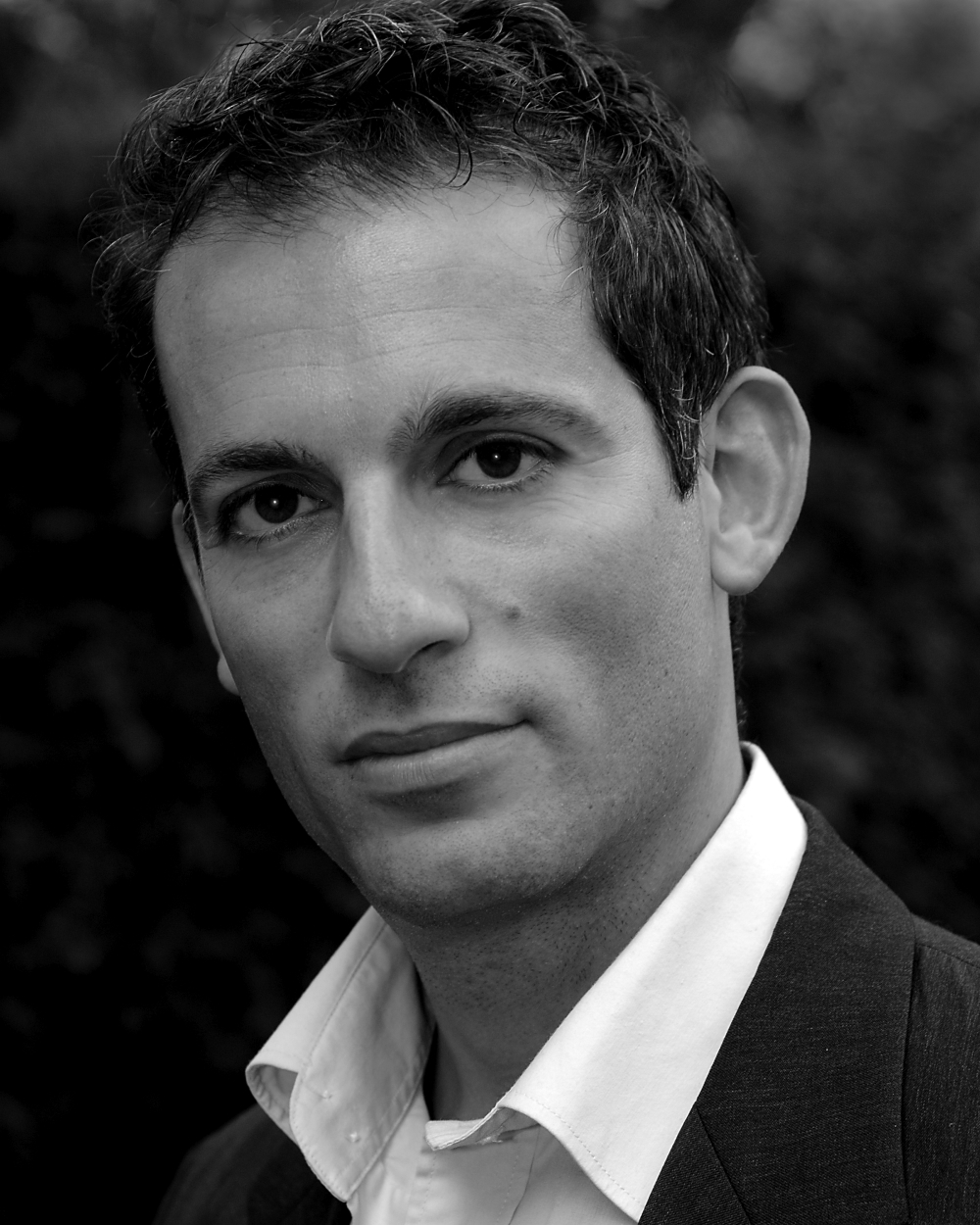
- Pavlo in 2010 publicity shot
- Born: 6 June; Enfield, London, England
- Occupations: Producer, Writer, Actor
- Years active: 1993–present
- Website: Official website

Chris Pavlo (born Christopher Paul, 6 June) is a producer, writer and actor. He is co-founder and executive producer of The Podcast Company UK Ltd. and director of Soho Showreels

As an actor, Chris is best known for his voice-work, in particular for BBC radio drama and radio comedy (credits include The Way It Is, Concrete Cow, ElvenQuest, The Maltby Collection, and 15 Storeys High) The Radetzky March, as well as numerous commercial campaigns and animations. His most recent work includes Homefront, during a season with the BBC Radio Drama Company in 2015.

== Awards ==
Sony Gold Award for Radio Drama 2009, Mr Larkin's Awkward Day, directed by Steven Canny.

Chris was awarded the BBC Greenlight Award for new comedy writing in 2001, along with Alex Lowe and Tracy-Ann Oberman.
