= Moira Brooker =

English actress and presenter (born 1957)

Moira A.S. Brooker
- Born: 1957 (age 68–69); Croydon, Surrey, England
- Occupations: Actress, presenter
- Years active: 1982–present
- Spouse: Anthony Milner (m. 1985; died 2015)
- Children: 2

Moira Brooker (born 1957) is an English actress and presenter. She is best known for playing Judith Hanson in the British sitcom As Time Goes By.

== Biography ==
Brooker was born in Croydon, Surrey, and is the daughter of Victor Brooker and Ethel Bassett; she has an older sister, Janis. In 1983, Brooker appeared in the television series Agatha Christie's Partners in Crime, appearing in the sixth episode "The Ambassador's Boots". In 1984, she appeared in a play called Canterbury Tales, which was adapted from Geoffrey Chaucer's book of the same name by Phil Woods, and director Michael Bogdanov.

In 1992, she joined the cast of As Time Goes By, which starred Judi Dench and Geoffrey Palmer. Brooker played Judith Hanson, the twice-divorced daughter who runs a secretarial agency with her mother, Jean Pargetter, played by Dench. In 1995, Brooker appeared in the BBC1 miniseries Ghosts, appearing in the second episode "Blood and Water" as Angela McClean, a woman unnaturally close to her brother.

In early 2010, Brooker and actress Jenny Funnell, who played Sandy in As Time Goes By, were both flown into New York City, New York to appear in WNET's and other PBS stations' pledge drives.

Brooker married actor Anthony Milner in 1985, and has two children. Milner died in July 2015.
