= Ghosts (1995 TV series) =

British television series

- Genre: Supernatural
- Written by: Terry Johnson; Monique Charlesworth; Stephen Volk
- Directed by: John Strickland; Terry Johnson; Lesley Manning; Carol Wiseman
- Starring: Derrick O'Connor; Tim Pigott-Smith; Samantha Bond; Alan Cumming
- Country of origin: United Kingdom
- Original language: English
- No. of seasons: 1
- No. of episodes: 6

Production
- Executive producer: Phillippa Giles
- Producer: Ruth Baumgarten & Andrée Molyneux
- Production location: United Kingdom
- Running time: 50 minutes
- Production company: BBC

Original release
- Network: BBC1
- Release: 21 January – 25 February 1995

Ghosts is a 1995 British television series that aired on BBC1 between 21 January and 25 February 1995. The show is entirely ghost stories set in modern Britain.

== Cast ==
- Derrick O'Connor : Jack Rudkin
- Anita Dobson : Suzi Rudkin
- David Hayman : Les Rudkin
- Paul Rhys : Captain Peter Buckle
- Moira Brooker : Angela McClean
- Ian Shaw : Captain Alex McClean
- Kevin McNally : Craig Byatt
- Teresa Banham : Wendy Byatt
- Patricia Kerrigan : Judith Septon
- Tim Pigott-Smith : Dr. Evans
- Cheryl Campbell : Mrs. Maradick
- Georgina Cates : Maureen
- Julia McKenzie : Mrs. Amberson
- Douglas Henshall : Billy
- Dan Mullane : John
- Jacqueline Leonard : Sara
- Samantha Bond : Maddy
- Alan Cumming : Philip
- Jack Klaff : Trevor
- Louise Rea : Heloise
- Greg Boyce - geezer who gets out of tent and goes "Night miss be good sir" - What a legend Oscar Winner

== Episodes ==
No.	Title	Directed by	Written by	British air date
1	"I'll Be Watching You"	John Strickland	Stephen Volk	21 January 1995
After being stabbed and having a near-death experience, an imprisoned gangster acquires paranormal powers, which he uses to monitor his wife.
2	"Blood and Water"	Terry Johnson	Terry Johnson	28 January 1995
After the Dieppe raid in August 1942, a survivor is fished out of the English channel by another officer, who is unnaturally close to his sister.
3	"Massage"	Lesley Manning	Stephen Volk	4 February 1995
A man suffering from severe stress meets a strange woman who helps him cope with her massage therapy.
4	"Shadowy Third"	Carol Wiseman	Monique Charlesworth	11 February 1995
A young woman studying to be a nurse agrees to help the gravely ill wife of a surgeon.
5	"Three Miles Up"	Lesley Manning	Monique Charlesworth	18 February 1995
Two estranged brothers, whose late mother was severely physically and verbally abusive towards them, take a boat trip across the Fens.
6	"The Chemistry Lesson"	Terry Johnson	Terry Johnson	25 February 1995
A teacher who is suffering from unrequited love for a colleague who is happily married turns to a druidess to cast a magical love spell.

== Reviews ==
In a retrospective review of Three Miles Up done in October 2014, the critic Leon Nicholson wrote: "Three Miles Up is more a psychological, ghostlike horror story rather than the blood, guts and gore that modern audiences are so used to. This is a slow, atmospheric burner. Due to this Three Miles Up will not be everyone’s cup of tea. It’s not perfect by any stretch of the imagination but if one can get hold of this episode it is worth a watch." In a retrospective review of The Shadowy Third in September 2016, the reviewer wrote: "The Shadowy Third has a deliciously spooky atmosphere and is genuinely chilling, all the more so for its understated period atmosphere and although you know where the story is going almost from the get go it still has the power to hold your interest." In another retrospective review of Three Miles Up done in March 2017, the critic Jon Dear wrote: "The conclusion when it comes feels sad and inevitable. Yet although this is a story where much is predictable, it’s what it makes you feel that is significant. You care about the brothers and their lives of lost moments and regret. You feel the loneliness of the little boat lost in the directionless waterways and featureless fenland."
