= A Bit of a Do =

British television series

- Genre: Comedy drama
- Starring: David Jason; Gwen Taylor; Nicola Pagett; Paul Chapman; Michael Jayston; Stephanie Cole; Tim Wylton; Sarah-Jane Holm; David Thewlis
- Theme music composer: George Melly; Ray Russell
- Country of origin: United Kingdom
- Original language: English
- No. of series: 2
- No. of episodes: 13 (List of episodes)

Production
- Executive producer: Vernon Lawrence
- Producer: David Reynolds
- Production locations: Knaresborough, North Yorkshire
- Running time: 50 minutes
- Production company: Yorkshire Television

Original release
- Network: ITV
- Release: 13 January – 1 December 1989

Related
- Rich Tea and Sympathy

A Bit of a Do is a British comedy-drama series based on the books by David Nobbs. The show starred David Jason and Gwen Taylor. It was produced by Yorkshire Television for two series and thirteen episodes and aired on the ITV network between 13 January and 1 December 1989.

The show was set in a fictional Yorkshire town. Each episode took place at a different social function and followed the changing lives of two families, the working-class Simcocks (David Jason, Gwen Taylor, David Thewlis and Wayne Foskett) and the middle-class Rodenhursts (Nicola Pagett, Paul Chapman, Sarah-Jane Holm and Nigel Hastings), together with their respective friends, Rodney and Betty Sillitoe (Tim Wylton and Stephanie Cole), and Neville Badger (Michael Jayston). The series begins with the wedding of Ted and Rita Simcock's son Paul to Laurence and Liz Rodenhurst's daughter Jenny, an event at which Ted and Liz begin an affair. The subsequent fallout from this affair forms the basis for most of the first series.

== Cast ==
- Ted Simcock (David Jason) – a working class Yorkshireman in his early fifties, Ted claims to be proud of his roots and paints himself as very down-to-earth. However, he clearly aspires to climb the social ladder, constantly boasting about the success of his business, the Jupiter Foundry, at functions (with a running joke being that no one has ever heard of it). Ted's downfall is women, having already had three affairs prior to leaving Rita for Liz.
- Rita Simcock (also Spragg) (Gwen Taylor) – Ted's wife, who begins the series as a homely woman lacking in confidence, obsessed by what others will think of her and her family. However, after Ted's desertion she discovers an inner strength, becoming independent and developing an interest in political and social issues, changing her appearance and even becoming a local councillor.
- Liz Rodenhurst (née Ellsworth-Smythe; later Badger) (Nicola Pagett) – an attractive, confident and sexually promiscuous woman, Liz is in many ways the polar opposite of Rita; although like Rita, her social standing is her chief concern in life. Her husband Laurence tolerates her affairs as long as she's discreet; a weakness for 'bits of rough' leads her to Ted. A seemingly cold woman, Liz finally shows genuine emotion when she loses her second husband, Neville, in a car crash.
- Laurence Rodenhurst (Paul Chapman) – An emotionally repressed, 'stiff upper lip' middle class dentist, Laurence is obsessed with behaving properly and his public image. He seems uninterested in Liz's affairs as long as they don't embarrass him socially, and has high expectations of his children. Most people consider him cold and emotionless, making his suicide after Liz leaves him all the more shocking.
- Neville Badger (Michael Jayston) – Laurence's recently widowed oldest friend. A respected solicitor, he finds it impossible to hide his grief over wife Jane's death, and is deeply ashamed to have publicly revealed it. He later marries Liz, after which he becomes almost unbearably upbeat about life. He is killed in a car crash (off-screen), his funeral being the focus of the penultimate episode.
- Betty Sillitoe (Stephanie Cole) – Rita's oldest friend; a kind and loving woman with two key vices – gossip and alcohol. She tries hard to help her friends but normally makes things worse. She and husband Rodney have a famously happy marriage, and equally famously get drunk alternately at functions.
- Rodney Sillitoe (Tim Wylton) – Betty's husband and Ted's oldest friend. Like his beloved wife, Rodney is kind and loving, but let down by his penchant for drink. He owns a battery chicken farm, Cock-a-doodle Chickens, and claims to feel no guilt about this; however, this changes when he is drunk, leading him to feel very depressed.
- Jenny Simcock (née Rodenhurst) (Sarah-Jane Holm) – Liz and Laurence's idealistic daughter, whose marriage to Paul Simcock introduces the families. She is deeply concerned by social and political issues such as feminism, poverty and starvation in Africa and is strongly moral; however, she is actually somewhat naive about the real world. She has a complicated love life, entering a relationship with her brother-in-law Elvis after splitting from Paul, later leaving Elvis to reunite with his brother.
- Paul Simcock (David Thewlis) – Ted and Rita's younger son; a self-confessed 'great wet slob' until he meets Jenny, and begins to share her political and social concerns. Like Jenny, he is a very intense character whose morals are offended by Ted and Liz's affair; however, he breaks his own code by having a drunken one-night stand with Carol Fordingbridge. Paul is not seen on-screen in series two, but is mentioned in each episode.
- Elvis Simcock (Wayne Foskett) – Ted and Rita's elder son. Elvis is a philosophy graduate and sees himself as very intelligent; however, he finds thinking is not a quality that counts for much when job-hunting. After a short relationship he and Carol (his brother's former lover) become engaged; however, this ends because Elvis constantly makes Carol feel inferior. He later starts a relationship with his sister-in-law Jenny, but eventually loses out to Paul. He has a tempestuous relationship with Jenny's brother Simon, the two frequently arguing due to their opposing world views, but at times there are signs a friendship will develop.
- Simon Rodenhurst (Nigel Hastings) – Liz and Laurence's son, he's adored by Liz, but has a more difficult relationship with his father. A successful estate agent but a flop with women, he frequently clashes with cynical philosopher Elvis, who sees Simon as morally bankrupt. After his first sexual encounter results in an unplanned pregnancy (with Neville's nephew's wife being the mother) Simon turns to celibacy, but changes his mind after he meets Lucinda Snellmarsh, an equally ill-at-ease estate agent.
- Carol Fordingbridge (Karen Drury) – Laurence's former receptionist who has a one-night stand with Paul. After starting a job at Cock-a-doodle Chickens, Carol becomes engaged to Elvis. Although attractive and outgoing, Carol lacks confidence in her intellect, particularly as Elvis seems embarrassed by her (later causing them to split up). Initially disliked by Rita because of her role in Paul and Jenny's break-up, Carol becomes something of her protege, and begins retaking her A Levels as a result of her encouragement.
- Sandra Pickersgill (later Simcock) (Tracy Brabin) – A good-hearted but notoriously clumsy waitress who begins a relationship with Ted, despite an age gap of over twenty years. She's down-to-earth and doesn't share Ted's desire to impress socially. She's devastated when Ted ends things with her to marry Corinna; however, she eventually forgives him and becomes his second wife in the final episode.
- Lucinda Snellmarsh (Amanda Wenban) – Simon's girlfriend (and later fiancée) from series two onwards. Like him, she's a socially awkward estate agent; however, when Simon loses his job she proves surprisingly assertive in rescuing his career.
- Geoffrey Ellsworth-Smythe (later Spragg) (Malcolm Tierney) – Liz's brother; an anthropologist who returns to the UK after over twenty years in Africa and, to Liz's horror, begins a relationship with Rita. He and Liz are not close and he doesn't share her snobbery. He takes Rita's maiden name at their marriage.
- Corinna Price-Rodgerson (Diana Weston) – an upper-class, sophisticated businesswoman who sets her sights on Ted, breaking up his relationship with Sandra. She persuades Ted they should open a restaurant in Africa; however, on the night of their farewell party she is arrested at the airport and revealed to be a con artist, real name Mavis Stant.
- Gerry Lansdowne (David Yelland) – an ambitious young politician who begins a relationship with older woman Rita after her marriage break-up. Rita jilts him on their wedding day after realising she will come second to his political aspirations.
- Eric Sidall (Malcolm Hebden) – a camp, over-talkative barman at The Angel Hotel, who frequently attempts to engage the regulars in long-winded stories, usually involving his 'ex-brother-in-law from Falkirk'. In the novels, the role of barman alternates between Eric and another barman, Alec Skiddaw - but while Alec is mentioned by name in the TV series, only Eric appears, with his personality combining elements of both characters from the books.
- Percy and Clarrie Spragg (Keith Marsh and Maggie Jones) – Rita's parents. Rita is frequently embarrassed by her father's coarse behaviour, which he in turn plays up to. However, he genuinely loves his daughter, and she is touched by his anger at Ted's behaviour. Rita is devastated when Percy dies in her arms on the dancefloor; Clarrie later dies off-screen in hospital.
- Andrew Denton (Philip Bird) – Neville's nephew, well known for making unfunny or inappropriate quips and following them with 'Joke!', usually to the annoyance or bemusement of his audience. He proudly celebrates his wife Judy's pregnancy, having previously believed he was sterile, unaware that the real father is Simon.

== Episodes ==
=== Series overview ===
Series	Episodes	Originally released	
Series	Episodes	First released	Last released
1	6	13 January 1989	17 February 1989
2	7	20 October 1989	1 December 1989

=== Series 1 (1989) ===
No.	Title	Producer	Directed by	Original release date
1	"The White Wedding"	David Reynolds	David Reynolds	13 January 1989
It's the day of Jenny Rodenhurst and Paul Simcock's wedding. At the reception the mother of the bride Liz asks the father of the groom, Ted up to her room for a romantic liaison. Downstairs Jenny reveals she's already pregnant but hadn't said anything because all the guests had been looking forward to a white wedding. Jenny's brother Simon, who is an estate agent, mocks Paul's brother Elvis about wanting to be a philosopher leading Elvis to punch him.
2	"The Dentist's Dinner Dance"	David Reynolds	Les Chatfield	20 January 1989
Ted takes the news that Liz is pregnant badly. Liz says they should live together and leave the do. Although Laurence and Rita realise what has happened, they decide to keep up the pretence that everything is okay.
3	"The Angling Club Christmas Party"	David Reynolds	David Reynolds	27 January 1989
It's Ted Simcock's last day as chairman of the Angling Club. He's under pressure when a fellow member accuses him of cheating in the Angling competition. And things get even more hectic when Laurence and Rita turn up.
4	"The Charity Horse-Racing Evening"	David Reynolds	Ronnie Baxter	3 February 1989
Ted's company has gone into liquidation and now that he has no money Liz has inevitably left him. Ted tries to get Rita back while Laurence asks Liz to come home, but both women only have eyes for mutual friend Neville.
5	"The Crowning of Miss Frozen Chicken"	David Reynolds	Ronnie Baxter	10 February 1989
It's the Crowning of Miss Frozen Chicken evening. Paul and Jenny are plotting to disrupt events, but when Carol Fordingbridge, one of the competitors, finds out she tells Paul to stop the protest or she'll tell his wife about the fling they had. Elsewhere Laurence asks Neville to talk to his estranged wife Liz and persuade her to return home. Neville returns with the news that he and Liz have just got engaged.
6	"The Registry Office Wedding"	David Reynolds	David Reynolds	17 February 1989
Neville and Liz have just got married but Ted is now working at the restaurant where they hold their wedding reception, which makes things rather awkward. During the event, Rita arrives with a new boyfriend, Jenny and Paul decide to give their marriage another go and Carol is now going out with Paul's brother Elvis.

=== Series 2 (1989) ===
No.	Title	Producer	Directed by	Original release date
1	"The Church Wedding"	David Reynolds	John Glenister	20 October 1989
Everyone is stunned when Ted turns up at Rita and Gerry's wedding day, but one conspicuous absentee is Rita. Rita later surprises everyone by announcing she is going into politics herself, while the Sillitoes cause much amusement by revealing they're now vegetarian teetotalers.
2	"The Christening"	David Reynolds	David Reynolds	27 October 1989
Liz and Neville are having the baby christened and have not invited Ted, but he turns up anyway with a new fiancee – not girlfriend Sandra, but new love Corinna Price-Rodgerson. Ted assures Liz and Neville that he won't reveal that he's the father of baby Joycelyn (a name Ted despises), but there's a spanner in the works when it turns out Sandra is serving at the reception.
3	"The Grand Opening of Sillitoe's"	David Reynolds	John Glenister	3 November 1989
It's the opening night of Rodney and Betty's new restaurant – will they be able to see the night through without getting drunk? Ted and Liz are both refusing to talk to Rita due to her new ring road route destroying his business and her garden; but when Ted announces that he and Corinna are going to Africa to start a new restaurant, Rita seems disappointed. Meanwhile Paul and Jenny have split, as have Elvis and Carol, leading to a surprising romance. But most surprising of all is the identity of Rita's new boyfriend...
4	"The Farewell Party"	David Reynolds	David Reynolds	10 November 1989
Ted enjoys playing host at his fancy dress farewell party, but is stunned when the police arrive and inform him that Corinna is a conwoman and has been caught trying to flee the country. As he tries to pretend everything is fine, Elvis brings more bad news – Paul has been arrested.
5	"The Inauguration of the Outer Inner Relief Ring Road"	David Reynolds	David Reynolds	17 November 1989
It's Rita's 'great night' as her relief road project is publicly unveiled, but Paul's sentencing puts a cloud over the evening. Meanwhile, Ted's indiscreet comments to Rita's political rival put the success of the evening in further jeopardy.
6	"The Funeral"	David Reynolds	John Glenister	24 November 1989
It's a sad day as everyone gathers for Neville's funeral – however, the one person who doesn't seem upset is Liz. Rita wonders if she's made of ice, but Geoffrey suspects her positive demeanour is a front for genuine grief. Meanwhile a seriously incapacitated Ted takes Betty's offer of help completely the wrong way.
7	"The Civil Wedding"	David Reynolds	John Glenister	1 December 1989
Rita and Geoffrey prepare for their wedding and wonder where all their guests are, but get a shocking answer when the registry office doors open and a newly married Ted and Sandra walk out. With both receptions in the same hotel, Ted asks Rita and Geoffrey to pop by for a drink as a gesture of reconciliation. But with Jenny having gone back to Paul, Elvis regretting leaving Carol and Simon worried Lucinda has left him, can it really be happy ever after at last?

== Background ==
Pat Sandys, who had produced David Nobbs' play Cupid's Darts, was looking for plays for a series called Love and Marriage. The three ideas put forward by David Nobbs were a dentists' dinner dance, a Miss Ball Bearing competition and a diamond wedding. Though the ideas were not used, David Nobbs came up with the idea of having the same characters in different do's. Casting Gwen Taylor as Rita came first. David Nobbs wanted John Thaw and several others to play Ted Simcock, before David Jason was chosen.

The church seen in cartoon form in the opening title sequence is St John the Baptist Church in the town centre of Knaresborough, North Yorkshire. The lead spire with a criss-cross pattern and with a cockerel weather vane on top, and the clock with curved wording above it, both match between the drawing and the real church.

== Home media ==
The complete series was released on DVD by Network in a four-disc set on 22 January 2007.
