= Jenny Funnell =

British actress (born 1963)

- Born: 20 May 1963 (age 63); Nairobi, Kenya
- Occupation: Actress
- Years active: 1985–present
- Spouse: Sam Dale
- Children: 1

Jenny Victoria Funnell (born 20 May 1963) is a British actress. Her roles include Sandy in the British sitcom As Time Goes By from 1992 to 2005.

== Early life ==
Funnell was born in Kenya. She moved to the UK when she was four years old, and attended the Webber Douglas Academy of Dramatic Art. She initially started voice acting in radio drama while still a student at drama school, winning the Carleton Hobbs BBC Radio Drama Award in 1984.

== Career ==
Her earliest television work was also in the British soap opera Brookside (1985), the police series Bergerac (BBC 1988), and the episode "Peril at End House" in Series 2 of Agatha Christie's Poirot (ITV 1990).

Funnell started taking on comedy parts with an appearance in the comedy/drama Boon (ITV 1989), and a role in the television movie Norbert Smith: A Life. Other comedy roles for TV have included a guest appearance in the Channel 4 newsroom sitcom Drop the Dead Donkey (1994) and the romantic comedy Love Soup (2005).

Between 1992 and 2005, Funnell appeared in 58 episodes of the BBC sitcom As Time Goes By, in the role of 'Sandy' alongside Judi Dench and Geoffrey Palmer. The show lasted for nine series and was aired on BBC One.

She later made guest appearances in the ITV hospital drama The Royal (2003), played two separate parts in the BBC's medical drama Doctors (2002 and 2004), and appeared in the ITV police series The Bill (2006).

Since 2009, she has voiced nine different characters in the FromSoftware series Dark Souls and Bloodborne.

Her stage roles have included Sense and Sensibility at the Watermill Theatre, Bagnor, West Berkshire in April 2014, What the Butler Saw at The Haymarket Theatre in Basingstoke during September 2015, and A Murder Is Announced, which toured around the United Kingdom throughout 2019. Funnell was part of the original West-End cast of Michael Grandage's Hamlet, which starred Jude Law in the titular role. The production opened at the Donmar Warehouse in 2009. It then went to Denmark, performing in the gothic setting of Kronborg Castle, Shakespeare's inspiration for his fictionalised Elsinore, before finally transferring to the Broadhurst Theatre, on Broadway, in August 2009.

She also is a City of London Green Badge Tour Guide, offering general and special topic tours of the City of London.

== Personal life ==
Funnell has a daughter, who is also an actress.

== Filmography ==
Year	TV Series/Film Name	Role	Role Notes
1985	Brookside		
1985	Bergerac		
1989	Norbert Smith: A Life		
1990	Agatha Christie's Poirot	Nurse	Series 2 Episode 1 "Peril at End House"
1992–2005	As Time Goes By	Sandy	One of the main roles. Film credit.
1994	Drop the Dead Donkey		Guest Appearance
1999	Monster TV	Linda Dodds	Main character, 26 episodes
2002, 2004, 2011	Doctors		3 separate episodes.
2003	The Royal	Anna Freeman	
2005	Love Soup	Philippa	Guest Appearance
2006	The Bill	Stephanie Taylor	
2008	Coming of Age	Chloe Wheeler's mother	
2009	Demon's Souls	Yuria the Witch	
2011	Dark Souls	Quelana of Izalith, Darkmoon Knightess	
2014	Hollyoaks	Receptionist	
2015	Bloodborne	Vileblood Queen Annalise, Doctor Iosefka	
2016	Dark Souls III	Karla	
2020	House Hack	Paulie	Film, supporting character
2021	Everything I Know About Love	Lesley	1 episode
