= David Nobbs =

English comedy writer (1935–2015)

- Born: David Gordon Nobbs; 13 March 1935; Orpington, Kent, England
- Died: 8 August 2015 (aged 80); Harrogate, North Yorkshire, England
- Citizenship: United Kingdom
- Education: Marlborough College; St. John's College, Cambridge
- Occupations: Author novelist scriptwriter
- Writing career
- Genre: Comedy
- Notable works: The Fall and Rise of Reginald Perrin; A Bit of a Do

David Gordon Nobbs (13 March 1935 – 8 August 2015) was an English comedy writer, most notable for writing the 1970s television series The Fall and Rise of Reginald Perrin, adapted from his own novels.

== Life and career ==
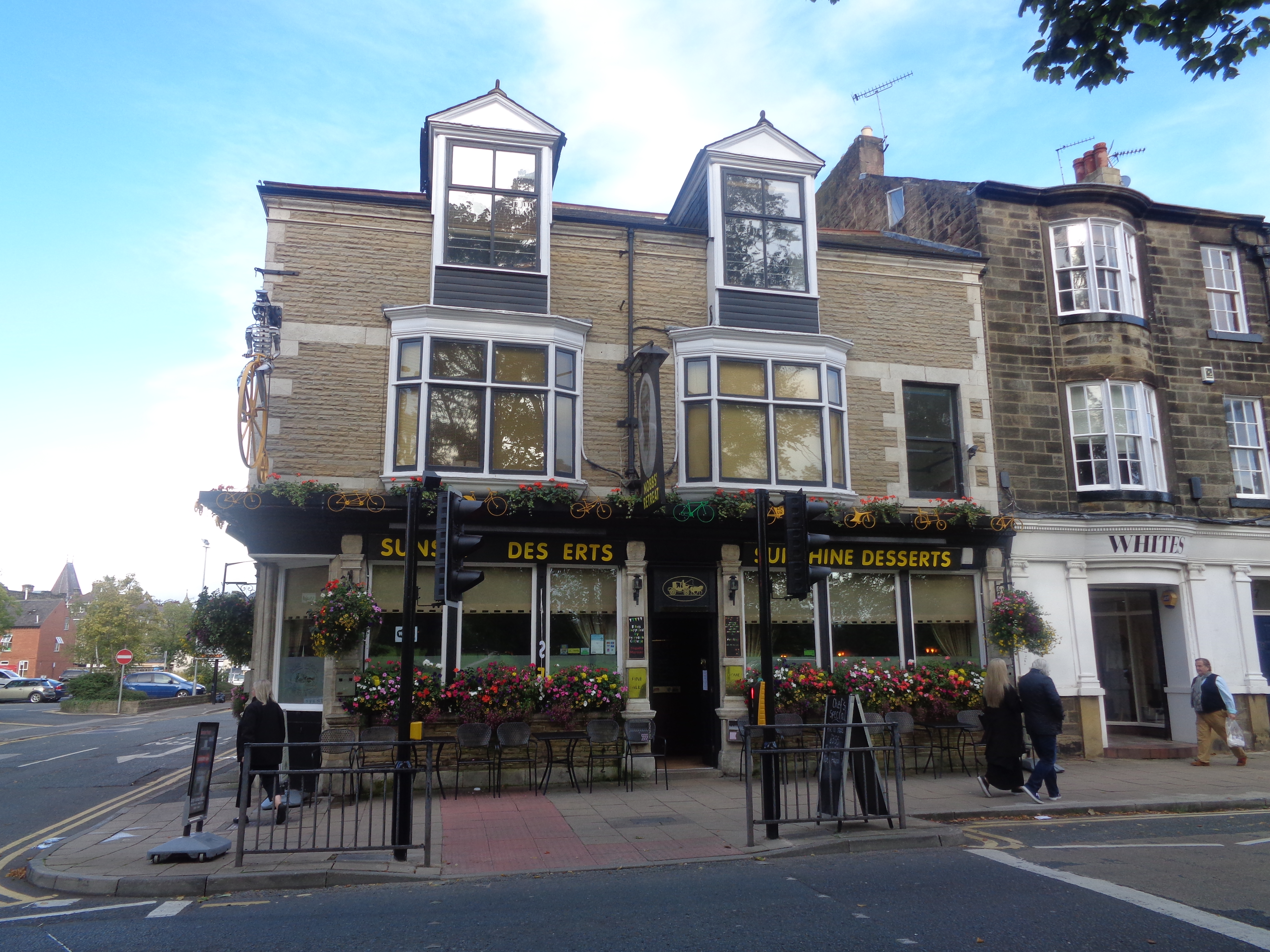
The Coach and Horses pub in Harrogate, frequented by Nobbs, dressed as Sunshine Desserts (from The Fall and Rise of Reginald Perrin) following Nobbs's death.

Nobbs was born in Orpington, Kent. Following an education at Marlborough College and St John's College, Cambridge, he worked as a reporter for the Sheffield Star, before starting his career in comedy as a writer for That Was The Week That Was in the early 1960s. He wrote for many of Britain's comedy performers over the years, including Kenneth Williams, Frankie Howerd, Les Dawson and The Two Ronnies.

Nobbs was the creator of the sitcom The Fall and Rise of Reginald Perrin (1976–79), adapted from his own Reginald Perrin novels, which "told the story of a man living an escapist fantasy in response to the mundanity of his daily commute". The TV series starred Leonard Rossiter as Perrin.

Nobbs also wrote the comedy/drama series A Bit of a Do (1989) and the Henry Pratt series of novels, the fourth of which, Pratt à Manger, was published in 2006. His novel It Had to be You was published in 2011.

== Humanism ==
A passionate humanist and a believer in the ideals of secularism, Nobbs was a longstanding Patron of the British Humanist Association. Although he was devoutly religious into his teens, at 18 Nobbs realised he was an atheist. From then on and throughout his career, he used his writing to explore humanist ideas about the nature of people and relationships. In particular, he cited his novels Obstacles to Young Love and It Had to Be You as two books strongly influenced by humanism, saying "I would describe them as being humanist books as well as humorous ones":

…[T]he most important thing that happened to me in the wake of my mother's death wasn't the strengthening of my feelings against religion. It was the strengthening of my feelings for disbelief. I believe that there are just as many of the "Christian virtues" to be found among the faithless as the faithful. Furthermore, these qualities are explored and developed along individual paths. We have no God whom we can burden with the responsibility for our actions. Loss of faith: it sounds so negative. I didn’t lose faith. I gained faith. Faith in people. I am proud to describe myself as a humanist. Last year I joined the British Humanist Association, and I don’t think I would have made this move if I had not seen my mother die that sunny Sunday morning.

After becoming a Patron of the BHA, Nobbs supported the charity across both its campaigning work and its support for non-religious people through services. In September 2010 Nobbs, along with 54 other public figures, signed a BHA open letter published in The Guardian, stating his opposition to Pope Benedict XVI's state visit to the UK. In 2014 he was one of a number of high-profile signatories of an open letter that challenged David Cameron on his assertions that Britain was a "Christian country". That same year, he wrote the foreword to a new edition of Jane Wynne Wilson's book about humanist funerals, Funerals Without God, writing that "One cannot think of the significance of a humanist death without thinking about the significance of a humanist life, and I gradually found, beneath the facts and practical suggestions, a pretty good account of what it is to be a humanist, and how much more there is to it than just not believing in God."

== Novels ==
- The Itinerant Lodger (1965)
- Ostrich Country (1968)
- A Piece of the Sky is Missing (1969)
- The Death of Reginald Perrin (1975, later reissued as The Fall and Rise of Reginald Perrin)
- The Return of Reginald Perrin (1977)
- The Better World of Reginald Perrin (1978)
- Second From Last in the Sack Race (1983)
- A Bit of a Do (1986)
- Pratt of the Argus (1988)
- Fair Do's (1990)
- The Cucumber Man (1994)
- The Legacy of Reginald Perrin (1996)
- Going Gently (2000)
- Sex and Other Changes (2004)
- Pratt à Manger (2006)
- Cupid's Dart (2008)
- Obstacles to Young Love (2010)
- It Had to be You (2011)
- The Fall and Rise of Gordon Coppinger (2012)
- The Second Life of Sally Mottram (2014)

== Television works ==
- The Two Ronnies (contributor)
- Shine a Light
- The Fall and Rise of Reginald Perrin
- The Sun Trap
- The Hello Goodbye Man
- A Bit of a Do
- Fairly Secret Army
- Dogfood Dan and the Carmarthen Cowboy
- The Life and Times of Henry Pratt
- Rich Tea and Sympathy
- The Legacy of Reginald Perrin
- Love on a Branch Line
- Stalag Luft
- Reggie Perrin

== Radio works ==
Nobbs wrote a number of works for radio, all of which were broadcast on BBC Radio 4:

- five excerpts from "I Didn't Get Where I Am Today" were read by the author on Book of the Week in April 2003.
- his dramatisation of the novel What a Carve Up! was serialised from February to April 2005.
- The Maltby Collection, a comedy set in a museum featuring long-time collaborator Geoffrey Palmer, ran for three series of six episodes from 2007 to 2009.
- "Three Large Beers", a 45-minute play, was the Afternoon Drama on 10 April 2007.
- "Silent Nights", a 45-minute play, was the Afternoon Drama on 22 September 2008.
- "We Happened To Be Passing" a 45-minute play, was the Afternoon Drama on 24 September 2010.
- "With Nobbs On" was a three-part feature broadcast weekly from 21 May 2012 in which Nobbs told anecdotes about his career in front of a studio audience.
- "The Surprising Effect of Miss Scarlett Rosebud", a 45-minute play, was the Afternoon Drama on 23 April 2014.

== Non-fiction ==
- I Didn't Get Where I Am Today (autobiography, 2001)

== Personal life and death ==
Nobbs was married twice, firstly to Mary Blatchford in 1968, from whom he was divorced sometime after the success of Reginald Perrin, and secondly to Susan Sutcliffe in 1998.

Nobbs died on 8 August 2015 aged 80. He was survived by his second wife and four step-children.
