= The Maltby Collection =

- Genre: Comedy
- Running time: 30 minutes
- Country of origin: United Kingdom
- Language(s): English
- Home station: BBC Radio 4
- Starring: Julian Rhind-Tutt; Geoffrey Palmer; Rachel Atkins; Ben Willbond; Chris Pavlo
- Created by: David Nobbs
- Written by: David Nobbs
- Original release: 15 June 2007 – 2009
- No. of series: 3
- No. of episodes: 18
- Opening theme: I'm on My Way
- Website: The Maltby Collection at BBC Radio 4

The Maltby Collection is a BBC Radio 4 sitcom set in a small, threatened art gallery. The first series was broadcast in six parts, at 11.30am on Fridays from 15 June 2007. Its theme tune is "I'm on My Way". The show was written by David Nobbs. A second series began broadcasting on 2 June 2008, including a re-recording of the theme song. On 26 August 2009 a third series began airing, with the museum facing huge budget cuts due to the economic downturn. Sadly, Walter Brindle is unable to bring himself to cut any staff, no matter how hard he tries.

== Plot outline ==
Rod Millet, the son of a well-known maker of biscuits, returns to the museum where he spent his adolescence retreating from the world. He has had a varied career, including a stint as a cowherd in Arizona and a zinc miner in Bolivia. He is the last candidate to be interviewed for the position of Deputy Curator of Painting and Sculpture. None of the others were acceptable. Rod is not particularly suitable, but he does play midfield in soccer, much to the delight of Director Brindle, and he has certain qualities that catch the eye of the Curator, Prunella Edgcombe. The objections of the upper-crust Julian Crumb-Loosley are overridden. Julian's main objection seems to be to Rod's working-class background.

On Rod's first day, the news arrives that the gallery is to be closed and the collection broken up. Brindle is elated as he will be able to retire early. Prunella is not so happy, but she and Julian quickly land other jobs. Rod, realizing that the staff of the museum will not be so fortunate, decides to campaign to save the collection (however, the closure plot is wrapped up rather abruptly four episodes into the initial run, though Rod's efforts to attract more visitors continue into season two).

In the second series it is revealed that the museum's endowment originally came from the company "Joshua Maltby & Sons", a manufacturer of porcelain toilets in Blackburn. The last of the Maltbys, Susie Maltby (Margaret Cabourn-Smith), appears as a new character. She begins an affair with Brindle only to break it off when he falls for her and his wife leaves him.

By the start of the third series Susie is involved with Rod, and Prunella and Julian are married. Prunella begins to dislike Julian's foibles while Rod defends Brindle against Susie's attempts to torment him. Brindle resigns himself to a peaceful life alone, only to have his wife return unexpectedly.

== Themes ==
The show features many trademarks of David Nobbs's comedy style. Characters tend to have long, almost poetic speeches, frequently reciting witty lists of ideas or qualities. An example occurs in the first episode during the job interview.

Julian : What do you think you would bring to the world of Art and culture, Mr. Millet?
Rod: Enthusiasm, natural good taste, dedication, energy, judgment, reliability, industriousness, warmth, biscuits, stamina, a new perspective, a fresh eye, streetwise shrewdness, passion, perspicacity, practicality, punctuality, imagination, integrity and... humility.

Phrases are repeated back and forth between characters in conversation, creating a rhythmic quality. This example occurs when Des Wainwright, the Head of Security, stops Rod on his way into the museum on his first day.

Rod: When I get to my office, if I ever get to my office, I'm going to commend your diligence

Des: Oh, you're going to commend my diligence, are you?

Rod: Don't you want to have your diligence commended?

Des: I do. I very much want my diligence commended. I love having my diligence commended. My diligence is all too rarely commended.

Rod: Good. So can I go and start work now?

Des: Not so fast. Now if I'm going to have my diligence commended, I'd better justify the commendation of my diligence, by being diligent!

Rod: I wish I'd never mentioned the commendation of your bloody diligence now!

Nobbs' characters frequently have verbal quirks. In this series Julian Crumb-Loosely frequently excuses some mannerism or failing of his by saying "All the Crumb-Looselys are ...". This is similar to "C.J." in "The Fall and Rise of Reginald Perrin" who would begin sentences with "I didn't get where I am today by ...".

Actor Geoffrey Palmer, who plays Director Brindle, has had a long association with Nobbs, beginning with The Fall and Rise of Reginald Perrin.

== Characters ==
- Rod Millet, son of the maker of "Millet's Milky Marvels" biscuits, is a rough diamond with a checkered career. Not only has he been a cowherd in Arizona and a zinc miner in Bolivia, but he has also been a "guest of Her Majesty". The museum is his second favourite place in the world, after White Hart Lane. His favourite artwork is Whistler's Sister.
- Walter Brindle, OBE is the Director of the Museum. He has two great passions: telling people about his OBE, and beating the other London museums and galleries at football.
- Prunella Edgcombe, "single, unattached and available", is the head Curator of Painting and Sculpture at the museum, and something of a predator. After a brief dalliance Rod decides he does not wish to be manipulated, and tells her so.
- Julian Crumb-Loosley, scion of a somewhat inbred aristocratic clan, is the "Curator of everything except Painting and Sculpture". He constantly uses his family name as a touchstone, as in "All the Crumb-Loosleys are partial to digestives". Julian is actually in love with Prunella, though she seems to know it before he does. As she puts it "All the Crumb-Loosleys are shy. That's why they're so inbred. They only like to be with people they already know, so they wind up marrying each other".
- Des Wainwright is the Head of Security at the museum. A former SAS man from Belfast, he nevertheless admits to having a "horribly subservient streak". He is currently with "the third Mrs. Wainwright" and does not want to have to find the fourth. The other staff refer to him as "that mad bastard in Security" although they say it with a certain affection.

== Cast ==
- Rod Millet, deputy curator: Julian Rhind-Tutt
- Walter Brindle, OBE, director: Geoffrey Palmer
- Prunella Edgcombe, curator: Rachel Atkins
- Julian Crumb-Loosely, curator: Ben Willbond
- Wilf Arbuthnot, gallery attendant: Geoff McGivern
- Eva Tattle, cleaner: Julia Deakin
- Des Wainwright, security guard: Michael Smiley
- Stelios Constantinopoulis, canteen cook: Chris Pavlo
- Mark, Rod's friend from the British Museum: Ben Moor
- Rod's mum: Liza Sadovy
- Susie Maltby, last of the line (series 2): Margaret Cabourn-Smith
