= Eden End =

Play written by J. B. Priestley

Eden End is a play by J. B. Priestley, first produced by Irene Hentschel at the Duchess Theatre, London, on 13 September 1934.

== Plot introduction ==
In the last week of October 1912 the family of Dr Kirby, a widower in the North of England, is disturbed by the unexpected return of Stella, a "prodigal daughter" who left eight years before in order to pursue a career on the stage.

== Plot summary ==
=== Act I ===
One Tuesday afternoon Wilfred and Lilian are reminded of their sister when the old nurse, Sarah, happens to bring out the frock Stella wore on her night of triumph at the Town Hall. The siblings argue over whether Stella was right to leave; as Wilfred is employed in Nigeria, Lilian complains that she feels obliged to stay at Eden End in order to keep her father company. They are listening to the gramophone when, to their amazement, Stella arrives home, her first return in eight years.

Stella is enraptured by the familiar sights, and excitedly questions Wilfred and Lilian about what has happened in her absence. But when alone with Sarah she breaks down; her plans have come to very little. Her emotions are further stirred when Dr Kirby tells her how much he admires his daughter for boldly seeking her fortune, in contrast to his own decision to stay in northern England for the sake of his wife. He confides to her his belief that he has not long to live.

Lilian notices the mark of a recently removed wedding ring on her left hand, and Stella admits to her that in Australia she married a fellow actor, Charles, from whom she is now separated. Not long afterwards the eligible bachelor, Geoffrey Farrant, arrives at the house and sees Stella. Their former attraction is revived, to the anger of Lilian.

=== Act II ===
Charles Appleby arrives at Eden End that Friday; he has been called there by Lilian, who is jealous of Stella's easy relationship with Geoffrey. Charles interrupts their tryst, and Geoffrey is stunned to realise that Stella has failed to disclose her marriage.

Stella confronts Lilian and Lilian tries to justify her actions, revealing her long-suppressed anger over Stella's "selfishness", which, she claims, led to their mother's premature death.

=== Act III ===
On Saturday night Charles and Wilfred go out drinking. Stella expresses annoyance that Charles should lead her brother astray; Lilian takes the opportunity to continue their argument from the day before, and later Stella is again upset when her father, unaware of her lack of professional success, declares his admiration for her pluck.

Realizing that she no longer fits in her former home, Stella announces her departure, on the pretext of having been cast in a new production. She and Charles leave on the Sunday train, and it seems that they will try to patch up their marriage.

== Characters ==
- Dr Kirby
- Stella Kirby, the actress
- Wilfred Kirby, her younger brother
- Lilian Kirby, her younger sister
- Sarah, an old servant
- Geoffrey Farrant, a handsome bachelor
- Charles Appleby, Stella's husband, from whom she is separated

== Other productions ==
The work premiered on Broadway at the Theatre Masque on 21 October 1935. The production starred Alexander Gauge (Wilfred Kirby), Edward Irwin (Dr Kirby), Edgar Norfolk (Charles Appleby), Wilfred Seagram (Geoffrey Farrant), Louise Smith (Lillian Kirby), Ruth Vivian (Sarah), and Estelle Winwood (Stella Kirby).

In 1974, the National Theatre's production at The Old Vic starred Joan Plowright as Stella Kirby, Michael Jayston as Charles Appleby and Geoffrey Palmer as Geoffrey Farrant. The production was adapted for BBC Radio 4 that same year, described as a "stereophonic radio version".
