= As Time Goes By (TV series) =

British TV sitcom (1992–2005)

- From left: Sandy (Jenny Funnell), Jean (Judi Dench), Lionel (Geoffrey Palmer), Alistair (Philip Bretherton) and Judith (Moira Brooker)
- Genre: Sitcom; Romantic comedy
- Created by: Colin Bostock-Smith
- Written by: Bob Larbey
- Directed by: Sydney Lotterby
- Starring: Judi Dench; Geoffrey Palmer; Moira Brooker; Philip Bretherton; Jenny Funnell; Joan Sims; Frank Middlemass; Moyra Fraser; Paul Chapman; Janet Henfrey; Tim Wylton
- Opening theme: "As Time Goes By" by Joe Fagin
- Country of origin: United Kingdom
- Original language: English
- No. of series: 10
- No. of episodes: 67 (list of episodes)

Production
- Executive producers: Philip Jones (1992–2002); Trevor McCallum (1996); John Reynolds (1996–2005); Don Taffner (2002–05); John Bartlett (2005); Donald Taffner Jr. (2005)
- Producer: Sydney Lotterby
- Editors: John Jarvis (1992); Chris Wadsworth (1992–2002); Mykola Pawluk (2005)
- Running time: 64×30 minutes 1×53 minutes 1×56 minutes 1×60 minutes
- Production companies: Theatre of Comedy Entertainment; DLT Entertainment Ltd.

Original release
- Network: BBC1
- Release: 12 January 1992 – 30 December 2005

As Time Goes By is a British romantic sitcom that aired on BBC One from 12 January 1992 to 11 August 2002, running for nine series and two specials in 2005. Starring Judi Dench and Geoffrey Palmer, it follows the relationship between two former lovers who meet unexpectedly after losing contact for 38 years.

The series originated as an idea by Colin Bostock-Smith. It was produced and directed by Sydney Lotterby and was written by Bob Larbey, who had co-written both The Good Life and Ever Decreasing Circles with John Esmonde. In 2004, As Time Goes By was ranked No. 29 in Britain's Best Sitcom. The programme's original working title had been Winter with Flowers but was changed during its first day of filming because of the cast's protests. The new title was taken from the 1931 Herman Hupfeld song "As Time Goes By", and the recorded version by Joe Fagin was used as the title music.

The series was produced by Theatre of Comedy Entertainment in association with DLT Entertainment Ltd. for the BBC.

== Plot ==
Second Lieutenant Lionel Hardcastle and Middlesex Hospital nurse Jean Pargetter met in the summer of 1953 and fell head over heels in love, but then Lionel was posted to Korea. When he wrote to give her his mailing address there, the letter went astray. Jean assumed he had lost interest in her and stubbornly refused to ask the army to locate him; he, in turn, decided she must have lost interest in him.

After his war service, Lionel emigrated to Kenya, became a coffee planter, and married Margaret, whom he later divorced due to "mutual boredom". Some time after his divorce he returned to England. Meanwhile, Jean had also married and borne one child, Judith. After her husband's death, Jean opened "Type for You", a secretarial agency. Judith, 35 years old during the series, is twice divorced (from Ken, who had "sad eyes", and Edward, who was "very clever"); during most of the series, she lives with her mother and works at the secretarial agency.

Lionel, now writing his memoir, My Life in Kenya, hires a typist through "Type for You", unaware that Jean owns the agency. He and Jean first meet again when Lionel picks up Judith for a dinner date. Although Lionel and Jean's reunion is full of missteps and miscues, their romance gradually rekindles. In the third series, Lionel moves into Jean's house in Holland Park, London; they marry during the fourth series.

Lionel's memoir is published by Alistair Deacon, a go-getting entrepreneur much younger than Lionel. When pressed by Lionel, Alistair eventually admits that he only agreed to publish the book as a favour to Lionel's father, whose loan to Alistair's father was the foundation of Alistair's wealth; but he works hard for the success of the book and over time he becomes good friends with Lionel and Jean. Alistair is a vain ladies' man and likes to call Lionel "Li", but he is also good-hearted and energetic, and proves resourceful enough to handle many situations that arise.

In the first series, Judith develops a crush on Lionel while Alistair takes a similar interest in Jean and likes to call her "lovely lady". Both crushes are brief; eventually, Judith and Alistair fall for each other and, in the final series, marry. Other story arcs feature Lionel being asked to write an American TV mini-series, Just Two People, based on his early romance with Jean. The mini-series fails after much rewriting and network interference. Jean eventually retires from "Type for You" and later volunteers at a charity shop.

Jean's very efficient secretary and Judith's best friend is Sandy, who eventually moves in with the Hardcastles after splitting with her boyfriend Nick. After Jean's retirement, Judy and Sandy become co-managers of "Type for You". Sandy dates Harry, a policeman and amateur rugby player, whom she marries at the end of the series. Sandy's last name is never revealed on the show.

Other notable characters include Lionel's irrepressible father Rocky, whose favourite saying is "Rock on!" and who owns a large country house in Hampshire, which he later gives to Lionel; Rocky's housekeeper, Mrs. Bale, who has an unusual interest in the Shipping Forecast and gives exact times that meals will be ready; Rocky's gardener, Lol Ferris, who says Jean is a "tender woman"; and Lionel's glamorous young secretary Daisy, who firmly repels Alistair's clumsy efforts to chat her up every time they meet. In series 3 of the show, Lionel is told by Rocky's physician that his father has less than a year to live, but this plotline was dropped and Rocky continued to appear throughout the show's later series, including the final "Christmas Specials" in 2005.

Rocky marries Madge, who is as much a character as Rocky is, when he is 85 and she is 78 (Rocky features in the 2005 Christmas Special, where he must be around 97 years old). They travel the world, are country and western music fans, tool about in Madge's classic Cadillac convertible (with steer horns on the grille), and hang out at the local pub, where Madge sings. In series nine, Madge is mentioned as being on an archaeological dig in Egypt; in reality, Joan Sims died before filming began. Also appearing many times are Penny, the meddling, neurotic sister of Jean's late first husband, who calls Jean "poor Jean", and Penny's well-meaning but dull dentist husband, Stephen, who once accidentally declined appointment as an OBE.

== Cast ==
=== Main ===
- Jean Mary Pargetter (later Hardcastle) (Judi Dench) – a former nurse who now owns and runs a secretarial agency in London, "Type for You". Jean was married to David Hanson, who died young, leaving Jean a widowed single mother.
- Lionel Hardcastle (Geoffrey Palmer) – a retired coffee planter who spent most of his adult life in Kenya. Having sold his coffee plantation and divorced his wife, Lionel has returned to the UK to write his memoirs, entitled “My Life In Kenya”.
- Judith Hanson (Moira Brooker) – daughter of Jean and her late husband David. A two-time divorcee, Judy has moved back into her mother’s house while working at her mother’s secretarial agency.
- Alistair Deacon (Philip Bretherton) – the smooth-talking, wealthy and well-connected publisher who is overseeing the release of Lionel’s memoirs.
- Sandy (Jenny Funnell) – Jean's personal secretary and receptionist at Type for You as well as Judy’s best friend.

=== Recurring ===
- Penny (Moyra Fraser) – Jean's condescending, self-absorbed sister-in-law from her first marriage.
- Stephen (Paul Chapman) – Penny's entertainingly dull husband, who works as a dentist.
- Richard "Rocky" Hardcastle (Frank Middlemass) – Lionel's irrepressible upper-class father who owns a country home in the Hampshire countryside. Vivacious and young at heart, Rocky is the opposite of his son.
- Madge Darbley (later Hardcastle) (Joan Sims) – Rocky’s equally high-spirited fiancée and subsequent wife, who is seven years his junior.
- Harry (David Michaels and Daniel Ryan) – a rugby-obsessed policeman who starts dating Sandy.
- Mrs Bale (Janet Henfrey) – Rocky’s eccentric, very precise housekeeper who is interested in the Shipping Forecast and Australian Rules Football.
- Lol Ferris (Tim Wylton) – Rocky’s amiable, decidedly rural gardener. Lol has six brothers, all of whom become interested in Sandy.

A continuing plot arc in series 3 and 4 has Lionel writing Just Two People, a mini-series for American television. Recurring characters introduced during this time include American producer Mike Barbosa (played by Richard Holmes, who was credited under the pseudonym Otto Jarman) and the secretaries Daisy (played by Justine Glenton and Zoe Hilson) and Mrs Gwen Flack (Vivienne Martin).

== Production ==
Dench's real-life daughter Finty Williams appeared in the title sequence as the young Jean in one of the two pictures. The other was Palmer's son, Charles Palmer, as the young Lionel.

In the March 2011 PBS pledge drive programming special Behind the Britcoms: from Script to Screen hosted by cast members Moira Brooker and Philip Bretherton, the series creator/producer revealed that Jean Simmons had declined the first offer of the role of Jean (which was written with her in mind) due to her reluctance to uproot her life, specifically mentioning her dogs, garden, and family, in California.

== Episodes ==
Series	Episodes	Originally released	
Series	Episodes	First released	Last released
1	6	12 January 1992	16 February 1992
2	7	10 January 1993	21 February 1993
3	10	2 January 1994	6 March 1994
4	10	5 March 1995	7 May 1995
5	7	7 January 1996	25 February 1996
6	7	18 May 1997	29 June 1997
7	7	19 April 1998	31 May 1998
8	6	30 July 2000	1 September 2000
9	5	7 July 2002	11 August 2002
10	2	26 December 2005	30 December 2005

The programme ran for ten series, from 12 January 1992 to 30 December 2005. All of the episodes were thirty minutes long with the exception of the final three episodes which were considerably longer. In December 2020, UKTV split the final two episodes, which were also Christmas specials, into four shorter episodes. They added a 'next time on' and 'last time on' segment at the start and end of each episode.

== International broadcasts ==
As Time Goes By has appeared in the United States on BBC America, and has been running weekly on PBS member stations almost continuously since the early 2000s, with various cast members appearing on its perennial pledge drives. It has run in Canada on BBC Canada and TVOntario, in Australia on ABC, 7TWO, 9Gem and Fox Classics, in New Zealand on both UKTV and SKY Network Television, in Finland on YLE TV1, and on DSTV in Nigeria. RTÉ One has broadcast the series in Ireland repeatedly. It has been broadcast by Gold for viewers in the UK and Ireland as of 2010, and by UKTV in Australia and the UK as of 2011. As of 2017, series 1-9 are available to stream through the BBC/ITV online digital video subscription service Britbox. Starting in 2022, the series is being shown on the UKTV channel Drama.

== Radio ==
As Time Goes By was adapted and recorded for radio. Three series were broadcast on BBC Radio 2 between 1997 and 1999. The first episode included a flashback to Jean and Lionel 38 years before. All episodes correspond to a TV episode and featured the original cast, apart from Jon Glover substituting for Bretherton in episodes 1-5 of Series One. Only the first series was released on BBC audio cassette. Series One was repeated on BBC Radio 4 Extra from December 2014 to January 2015.

== Home media ==
In Region 1 in North America, the complete series has been released in individual sets and as a complete series from BBC Video. In the United Kingdom on Region 2, the series has been released several times; Universal Playback released the first four series on VHS and DVD format, with 2 Entertain acquiring the rights to release the remaining series on DVD, and additionally re-releasing the Series one to four and a complete collection on DVD. Cinema Club acquired the right to release the complete series over two sets, with the first containing Series One to Four and the following set containing Series Five to Nine. Acorn Media has released to 'The Reunion Specials' on DVD. In Australia on Region 4, the complete series has been released as individual sets and as a complete collection.

Title	Release date		No. of discs	Special features
Title	Original	Re-release	No. of discs	Special features
Region 1
Complete Series 1 & 2	17 September 2002	30 August 2005	2	Cast biographies
Complete Series 3	17 September 2002	30 August 2005	2	Cast biographies
Complete Series 4	2 April 2002	30 August 2005	2	Cast biographies
Complete Series 5	11 February 2003	30 August 2005	1	Cast biographies; Excerpts from Judi Dench's BAFTA tribute – featuring personal anecdotes from Geoffrey Palmer
Complete Series 6	3 February 2004	30 August 2005	1	Cast biographies; Trailers
Complete Series 7	15 March 2005	30 August 2005	1	Cast biographies; Trailers
Complete Series 8 & 9	30 August 2005	—N/a	2	Interviews with Geoffrey Palmer, Moira Brooker and Philip Bretherton; Cast biographies; Trailers
You Must Remember This	30 September 2003	30 August 2005	1	3 bonus episodes: Series 1, Episode 3; Series 3, Episode 2; Series 6, Episode 7; Cast biographies
The Reunion Specials	10 January 2006	—N/a	1	Oops, Sorry! – bloopers and outtakes; Making It – from the set
Complete Series 1–9	30 August 2005	31 October 2017	11	Interviews with Geoffrey Palmer, Moira Brooker and Philip Bretherton (original and re-release set); Excerpts from Judi Dench's BAFTA tribute (original set only); Cast biographies (original set only); Time to Remember – Judi Dench and Geoffrey Palmer reflect on their experience filming the show (re-release set only); Note: Set doesn’t include the Reunion Specials.
Volume One	1 November 2016	—N/a	4	Time to Remember: Part One – and interview with Dame Judi Dench and Geoffrey Palmer; Set contains Series 1–3
Volume Two	14 March 2017	—N/a	4	Time to Remember: Part Two – and interview with Dame Judi Dench and Geoffrey Palmer; Excerpts from Judi Dench's BAFTA tribute; Set contains Series 4–6
Region 2
Series 1	17 March 2003 (released as one set)	5 February 2007	3 (S1&2); 1 (S1) / 1 (S2)	None
Series 2	17 March 2003 (released as one set)	5 February 2007	3 (S1&2); 1 (S1) / 1 (S2)	None
Series 3	25 October 2004	5 February 2007	2	None
Series 4	21 February 2005	5 February 2007	2	None
Series 5	24 October 2005	—N/a	1	None
Series 6	30 January 2006	—N/a	1	None
Series 7	20 March 2006	—N/a	1	None
Series 8	22 May 2006	—N/a	1	None
Series 9	21 August 2006	—N/a	1	None
The Reunion Specials	24 October 2005	—N/a	1	None
The Complete Series 1–4	11 September 2006	—N/a	6	None
The Complete Series 5–9	2 October 2006	—N/a	5	None
Complete Series Collection Series 1–9	19 November 2007	2 November 2015 10 April 2023	11	None
Region 4
Series One & Two	5 May 2003	—N/a	2	None
Series Three & Four	10 November 2004	—N/a	3	None
Series Five & Six	7 April 2005	—N/a	3	None
Series Seven & Eight	6 October 2005	—N/a	2	None
Series Nine	5 August 2004	—N/a	1	None
Reunion Specials: Part 1	2 February 2006	—N/a	1	Bloopers
Reunion Specials: Part 2	4 May 2006	—N/a	1	Behind-the-scenes
Reunion Specials: Parts 1 & 2	30 November 2006	—N/a	2	Bloopers; Behind-the-scenes
Series One–Nine: Collector's Edition	5 October 2006	1 September 2011 1 September 2019	11	None
