= Tim Wylton =

British actor (born 1940)

- Born: Timothy Higginson; 27 February 1940 (age 86); Bangor on Dee, Wales
- Occupation: Actor
- Years active: 1964–2010
- Spouse: Ann Curthoys (m. 1963)
- Children: 2, including Huw Higginson

Tim Wylton (born Timothy Higginson; 27 February 1940) is a British actor best known for his television roles as Stanley Dawkins in My Hero, and Lol Ferris in As Time Goes By.

== Career ==
As a stage actor he appeared in Zeffirelli's noted 1961 Old Vic production of Romeo and Juliet and was a "mainstay" of the Royal Shakespeare Company between 1963 and 1977.

Wylton attended Strathallan School, Perthshire and RADA. His television appearances include The Liver Birds, The Sweeney, Maybury, The Dustbinmen, On Giant's Shoulders and Juliet Bravo. Wylton also had a role in the BBC's 1979 adaptation of Henry V, playing the rather lovable Fluellen.

During the 1980s, he acted on programmes such as Bergerac, To Serve Them All My Days, Campion, The Citadel and A Bit of a Do (as Rodney Sillitoe). In 1983, he appeared in the film Curse of the Pink Panther. During the 1990s, he had roles in All Creatures Great and Small, Agatha Christie's Poirot, Lovejoy, Rumpole of the Bailey, A Touch of Frost, The Darling Buds of May, French & Saunders, Peak Practice, Annie's Bar, Cadfael, C.A.T.S. Eyes and Wycliffe. In 1995, he appeared as Elizabeth Bennet's Uncle Gardiner in the adaptation of Pride and Prejudice.

From 1996 to 2002 he appeared in As Time Goes By as Lol Ferris. From 2000 to 2006, he appeared in My Hero as Stanley Dawkins. Since 2000, he has appeared in Absolutely Fabulous, Coronation Street, Casualty, Heartbeat and The Royal.

He is the father of actor Huw Higginson.

== Filmography ==
=== Film ===
Year	Title	Role	Notes
1971	Melody	Mr Fellows	
1971	Under Milk Wood	Mr Willy Nilly	
1974	Blue Blood	Morrell	
1983	Curse of the Pink Panther	Doctor	

=== Television ===
Year	Title	Role	Notes
1965	The Wednesday Play	Stewart in "The Navigators"	
1969–1970	The Dustbinmen	Eric	
1972	His and Hers	Car salesman	Episode: "Driving"
1979	Play for Today	Malcolm	Episode: "Instant Enlightenment Including VAT"
1982	The Bell	Father Bob Joyce	
1983	Rumpole of the Bailey	Dr. Overton	Episode: "Rumpole and the Sporting Life"
1984	Cockles	George	
1984	Strangers and Brothers	Percy Hall	2 episodes
1989	A Bit of a Do	Rodney Sillitoe	
1991	Agatha Christie's Poirot	Henry Delafontaine	Episode: "How Does Your Garden Grow?"
1994–1998	Wycliffe	Franks	
1995	Pride and Prejudice	Mr Gardiner	
1996–2002	As Time Goes By	Lol Ferris	
2001	A Small Summer Party	Nev	
2000–2006	My Hero	Stanley Dawkins	
2010	Midsomer Murders	Jim Hanley	Episode: "The Great and the Good"
