= Steven Canny =

British television producer

Steven Canny is an Executive Producer for BBC Studios Comedy and has written a number of plays.

== Education ==
Canny attended Filton High School, Bristol, before going to St. Brendan's Sixth Form College, Bristol, and the University of Surrey.

== Career ==
Canny moved into his career as a theatre director and writer after several years working at London's National Theatre. He was associate director for theatre company Complicité from 1999 to 2004 where productions included Mnemonic, The Noise of Time, The Elephant Vanishes, Light and he was also associate director on Al Pacino's The Resistible Rise of Arturo Ui. He was the dramaturg on Complicité's production of Measure for Measure at the National Theatre.

In 2009 he won the Sony Gold Drama Award with Mr Larkin's Awkward Day, a comedy radio play by Chris Harrald, broadcast on BBC Radio 4 on Tuesday, 29 April 2008 as the Afternoon Play. The Sony Gold citation said: "Assured direction, excellent performances and concise, skilfully-researched writing all made this deceptively straightforward story a masterpiece. Funny and touching by turns, a single, seemingly insignificant incident in the life of Philip Larkin brought out the humanity and humour of a poet whose personal life is not commonly associated with either."

In 2010 he won the Sony Gold Drama Award with People Snogging in Public Places by Jack Thorne. It was broadcast on Radio 3's The Wire. The Sony Gold citation said: "The judges described this as a wonderfully written and performed, highly original piece of radio drama in which the production perfectly mirrored the subject. Painful and funny, it was a bold exciting listen." The production was also shortlisted for the 2010 Prix Italia and the Tinniswood Award.

Canny was listed as the Executive Producer of the winners of the Gold, Silver and Bronze Sony Awards for Best Comedy in 2011. He was Executive Producer of the pan-BBC initiative for the Edinburgh Festival in 2011.

Canny was Executive Producer of more than 300 hours of comedy on Radio 4 including: News Quiz, Tom Basden's Party, Rudy's Rare Records, Radio 4's Advent Calendar and The Show What You Wrote.

Plays written include: A Dulditch Angel, Spyski (revived as The Importance of Being Honest), Origins, No Wise Men, The Hound of the Baskervilles The Arthur Conan Doyle Appreciation Society, and The Time Machine; A Comedy (nominated for an Olivier Award 2024).

By Spring 2023 The Hound of the Baskervilles has had more than 200 theatrical productions worldwide with the majority being in the US.

In September 2013, the BBC announced that they had appointed Canny as Executive Producer, BBC Comedy Scotland. There he has been the Executive Producer of Mammoth, Miller's Mountain (winner Scottish BAFTA Best Comedy 2014), Bob Servant (winner Best Comedy RTS Scotland Award), Don't Drop the Baton, Comedy Playhouse: Where it All Began, What's Funny about the Indyref, Still Game Live, Radges, Sketchland, Two Doors Down (winner Best Comedy RTS Scotland Award), Mrs Brown's Boys (winner of BAFTA, Scottish BAFTA, IFTA, RTS and National Television Award), Gary: Tank Commander Election Special, Stop/Start, Porridge, Pumped, British Sitcom: 60 Years of Laughing at Ourselves, A Christmas Carol Goes Wrong, Lost Sitcoms and Still Game series 7, 8 & 9.

== Personal life ==
Canny is married to theatre director Orla O'Loughlin, currently the Vice Principal and Director of Drama at the Guildhall School of Music and Drama in London.
