= Mr Larkin's Awkward Day =

Comedy radio play by Chris Harrald

Mr Larkin's Awkward Day is a comedy radio play by Chris Harrald, broadcast on BBC Radio 4 on Tuesday, 29 April 2008 as the Afternoon Play, repeated on 25 January 2010. The producer was Steven Canny. It won the Gold Award for Drama at the Sony Radio Academy Awards in 2009.

In 1957 Philip Larkin's friend Robert Conquest, of the group known as The Movement, played a practical joke on him. Mr Larkin's Awkward Day tells the true story of the joke, one that had Larkin fearing he might be sent to prison.

The Sony Gold citation said: "Assured direction, excellent performances and concise, skilfully-researched writing all made this deceptively straightforward story a masterpiece. Funny and touching by turns, a single, seemingly insignificant incident in the life of Philip Larkin brought out the humanity and humour of a poet whose personal life is not commonly associated with either."

== The plot ==
In September 1957, a pre-fame Larkin prepares for another ordinary day and picks up his post. But one letter stands out: an official-looking envelope embossed with the words Scotland Yard. At work, and at his desk, he opens the letter -it reveals that there is an ongoing investigation into a man who is dealing in pornographic literature - and that Larkin is on the man's mailing list. Further, that investigations may be made into the names on the mailing list under the 'Pornographic Materials Act of 1921'. These investigations may be followed by charges. Larkin begins to fret about what to do. His assistant advises him that an Inspector Clough has turned up and Larkin freezes when the policeman says that he is very interested in his literary tastes. Larkin begins to defend himself until it transpires that the men have crossed wires—one fears he is being quizzed about purchasing dubious magazines, the other thinks he is having a friendly chat about literature. Finally, Larkin prises himself free from the Inspector to dash off to a meeting with his solicitors, who ask him what journals he has been buying. After he returns to his lodgings his landlady knocks on Larkin's door—someone wants him on the 'phone. It's Larkin's historian friend, Bob Conquest, and he is laughing. He asks Larkin about the silly joke he played on him, the embossed envelope and so on. When it becomes clear that Larkin was completely taken in, Conquest offers to pay his solicitors' costs.
