= Fairly Secret Army =

British TV sitcom (1984–1986)

- Genre: Sitcom
- Directed by: Roy Ward Baker
- Starring: Geoffrey Palmer; Michael Robbins; Liz Fraser; Jeremy Child; Diane Fletcher
- Country of origin: United Kingdom
- Original language: English
- No. of series: 2
- No. of episodes: 13

Production
- Running time: 30 minutes
- Production company: Video Arts

Original release
- Network: Channel 4
- Release: 22 October 1984 – 13 October 1986

Fairly Secret Army is a British sitcom which ran to thirteen episodes over two series between 1984 and 1986. It reunited scriptwriter David Nobbs and lead actor Geoffrey Palmer, who had previously worked together on the BBC sitcom The Fall and Rise of Reginald Perrin. The title references the 1970s BBC drama series Secret Army.

Although not an official spin-off from the Perrin series, there is a clear link to the scene where Palmer's character, Jimmy Anderson, tells Reggie of a plan for a secret army, very similar to the one seen in this series. This scene is repeated, near verbatim, in episode 2 of Fairly Secret Army. As the BBC held the TV rights to the Perrin characters, it was not possible for Channel 4 to produce an official spin off, and so all references to the Perrin characters and stories were removed.

Harry Kitchener Wellington Truscott (ex Queen's Own West Mercian Lowlanders) is an inept and slightly barmy ex-army man intent on training a group of highly unlikely people into a secret paramilitary organisation. This idea first emerged in an episode of Perrin when Jimmy confided the plan to Reggie (who rubbished it) and was based on persistent rumours in the 1970s press that several generals were secretly planning a coup to "rescue" Britain from trade union militancy. The character's name was changed because Fairly Secret Army was broadcast on Channel 4, and the television rights to The Fall and Rise of Reginald Perrin and its characters were held by the BBC.

The first series was script edited by John Cleese, whose training films company was responsible for the series. The series did not have a laughter track. Nobbs only started work on the show when he turned down an offer to write a spin-off sitcom for Manuel of Fawlty Towers.

== Cast ==
- Geoffrey Palmer as Major Harry Truscott
- Michael Robbins as Sgt. Major Throttle
- Liz Fraser as Doris Entwisle
- Jeremy Child as Beamish
- Diane Fletcher as Nancy
- Richard Ridings as Ron Boat
- Ray Winstone as Stubby (Series 1)
- John Nettleton as Smith (Series 2)
- Gareth Forwood as Professional Man

== See also ==
A Very British Coup
