= David Michaels (actor) =

English stage and screen actor

David Michaels (born 15 June 1964) is an English stage and screen actor.

== Career ==
=== Screen ===
In 1984–5, Michaels played Alexander Holroyd in the fifth series of ITV educational drama How We Used to Live. He played hairdresser Jon Welch in Coronation Street between 1994 and 1996. He played Dr. Neil Bolton in the TV series Heartbeat (1998-1999). He also appeared in the series As Time Goes By as Harry the policeman (1998-2002). In 1991, he appeared in "Misterioso", an episode of the BBC series Play on One. In 1993, he appeared as Mister Burger in "Money for Nothing", an episode in the fifth series of the BBC anthology series Screen One. In 2001, he appeared in the film Nowhere in Africa, which won the Academy Award for Best Foreign Language Film. In 2011, he appeared as Brian Worsley in the BBC crime drama Hidden. In 2019 he played CS Kier Pritchard in the ITV drama A Confession. In 2014 he played Colin Bond; Headteacher of Havelock High 2 episodes of the tenth series of the BBC drama Waterloo Road.

=== Stage ===
In 1988, Michaels played Peter in Academy Award-winner Richard Rodgers' musical, Babes in Arms, in a production by the New Shakespeare Company. In 2010, he played Saddo in Herding Cats at the Ustinov Studio at the Theatre Royal, Bath.
