= Geoffrey Palmer (actor) =

British actor (1927–2020)

Geoffrey Palmer OBE
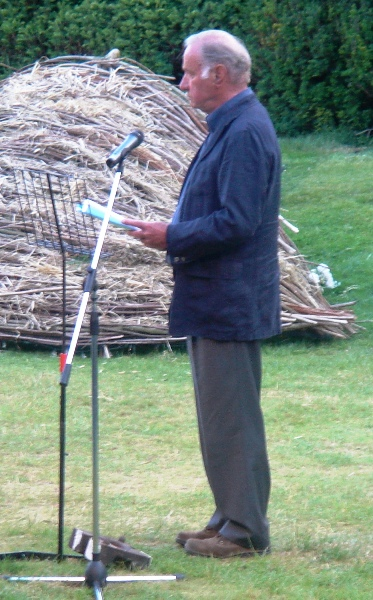
- Palmer in 2008
- Born: Geoffrey Dyson Palmer; 4 June 1927; North Finchley, Middlesex, England
- Died: 5 November 2020 (aged 93); Berkhamsted, Hertfordshire, England
- Occupation: Actor
- Years active: 1955–2020
- Spouse: Sally Green (m. 1963)
- Children: 2, including Charles Palmer

Geoffrey Dyson Palmer (4 June 1927 – 5 November 2020) was an English actor. His roles in British television sitcoms include Jimmy Anderson in The Fall and Rise of Reginald Perrin (1976–79), Ben Parkinson in Butterflies (1978–1983) and Lionel Hardcastle in As Time Goes By (1992–2005).

His film appearances include A Fish Called Wanda (1988), The Madness of King George (1994), Mrs Brown (1997), Tomorrow Never Dies (1997) and Paddington (2014). He also made guest appearances in television series such as The Avengers, Doctor Who, Fawlty Towers, Bergerac and Blackadder.

== Early life and education ==
Geoffrey Dyson Palmer was born on 4 June 1927 in North Finchley, Middlesex. He was the son of Frederick Charles Palmer, who was a chartered surveyor, and Norah Gwendolen (née Robins). He attended Highgate School from September 1939 to December 1945. He served as a corporal instructor in small arms and field training in the Royal Marines during his national service from 1946 to 1948, following which he briefly worked as an unpaid trainee assistant stage manager.

== Career ==
Palmer's early television appearances included multiple roles in episodes of The Army Game (Granada Television), two episodes of The Baron and as a property agent in Cathy Come Home (1966). After a major break in John Osborne's West of Suez at the Royal Court with Ralph Richardson, he acted in major productions at the Royal Court and for the National Theatre Company and was directed by Laurence Olivier in J. B. Priestley's Eden End. Palmer found the play so dull, however, that he was deterred from a stage career.

Two BBC sitcom roles brought him attention in the 1970s: the hapless brother-in-law of Reggie Perrin in The Fall and Rise of Reginald Perrin (1976–79), and the phlegmatic dentist Ben Parkinson in Butterflies (1978–1983).

In 1978, Palmer appeared as organized crimelord Simon Sinclair in London Weekend Television's hard-hitting police drama The Professionals, the episode entitled "Where the Jungle Ends".

Palmer played Doctor Price in the Fawlty Towers episode "The Kipper and the Corpse" (1979), determined to have breakfast amidst the confusion caused by the death of a guest and Fawlty's inept way of handling the emergency. In 1986, Palmer appeared as Donald Fairchild in the first series of an ITV sitcom, Executive Stress, alongside Penelope Keith. He later left, and was replaced by Peter Bowles.

Palmer later starred opposite Judi Dench for over a decade in another BBC sitcom, As Time Goes By (1992–2005). In 1997, he also appeared with Dench in the James Bond film Tomorrow Never Dies, in which he portrayed Admiral Roebuck to Dench's M, and Mrs Brown, playing Sir Henry Ponsonby to Dench's Queen Victoria.

Palmer's voice-over skills led to frequent work in commercials. Campaigns he was involved with include the 'Slam in the Lamb' ads for the Meat & Livestock Commission and the Audi commercials in which he was heard using the phrase "Vorsprung durch Technik". As a narrator, he worked on the BBC series' Grumpy Old Men and Grumpy Old Holidays, with Prunella Scales on Looking for Victoria in 2003, as well as narrating the audiobook version of Dickens' A Christmas Carol, released in 2005 as a podcast by Penguin Books. He narrated the documentary series Little England, and he continued to appear in productions written by Reggie Perrin creator David Nobbs, the last of these being the radio comedy The Maltby Collection broadcast from 2007. He starred in the final two episodes of the Radio 4 comedy series Two Pipe Problems, replacing the late Richard Briers.

In the 2006 DVD series The Compleat Angler, Palmer partnered Rae Borras in a series of episodes based on Izaak Walton's 1653 The Compleat Angler. In 2007, he recorded The Diary of a Nobody by George Grossmith and Weedon Grossmith as an online audiobook. In December 2007, Palmer appeared in the role of the Captain in "Voyage of the Damned", the Christmas special episode of the BBC science-fiction series Doctor Who; Palmer previously appeared in the classic era of the show in the Third Doctor serials Doctor Who and the Silurians (1970) (as Masters) and The Mutants (1972) (as the Administrator). In March 2009, he joined in a sketch with the two double acts Armstrong and Miller and Mitchell and Webb for Comic Relief. In 2011, he played the reactionary father-in-law of the eponymous clergyman of Rev. in its Christmas episode.

== Personal life and death ==
Palmer married Sally Green in 1963. They had a daughter, Harriet, and a son, Charles, a television director. Palmer was a longtime resident of Lee Common in the Chiltern Hills, Buckinghamshire, and enjoyed fly fishing in his spare time. At the time of his death, he resided in Berkhamsted, Hertfordshire.

Palmer died peacefully at his home on 5 November 2020, aged 93.

== Awards and recognition ==
In the New Year's Honours List published 31 December 2004 he was appointed an Officer of the Order of the British Empire (OBE) for services to drama. A drawing of Palmer by Stuart Pearson Wright is in the collection of the National Portrait Gallery, London.

== Appearances ==
=== Stage ===
| Year | Title | Role | Notes |
|---|---|---|---|
| 1952 | It Won’t Be a Stylish Marriage | Tim Barton | Grand Theatre, Croydon |
| 1954 | Meet Mr Callaghan | Det-Insp Grindall CID | Marlowe Theatre, Canterbury |
| 1954 | The Seven Year Itch | Richard Sherman | Royal Lyceum Theatre, Edinburgh |
| 1955 | Sabrina Fair | David Larrabee | King's Theatre, Edinburgh, Grand Theatre, Blackpool, and other locations |
| 1956 | Albertine by Moonlight | Chauffeur | Prince of Wales Theatre, Cardiff, Cambridge Arts Theatre, and other locations |
| 1963–1965 | Difference of Opinion | Executive - Christopher Pollard (Chief Surveyor) | Garrick Theatre, London, Wimbledon Theatre, and other locations |
| 1968 | Let’s Get a Divorce | Henri des Prunelles | Theatre Royal, Windsor |
| 1971–1972 | West of Suez | Edward | Royal Court Theatre, London, Cambridge Theatre, London, and other locations |
| 1972–1974 | Private Lives | Victor | Queen's Theatre and Globe Theatre |
| 1974 | Eden End | Geoffrey Farrant | London and Richmond Theatre, London |
| 1975–1976 | On Approval | Richard Halton (Replacement) | Theatre Royal, Haymarket, Forum Theatre, Billingham, and other locations |
| 1976–1977 | Saint Joan | Earl of Warwick | The Old Vic and Theatre Royal, Bath |
| 1977 | The Case of the Oily Levantine | | Yvonne Arnaud Theatre, Guildford |
| 1977–1978 | Saint Joan | | Bristol Hippodrome |
| 1979–1980 | Tishoo | Layborne | Wyndham's Theatre and Richmond Theatre |
| 1984 | A Friend Indeed | Sir John Holt | Theatre Royal, Windsor and Shaftesbury Theatre, |
| 1986–1987 | Kafka's Dick | | Royal Court Theatre |
| 1990 | Piano | Porfiry | Cottesloe Theatre, National Theatre, London |

=== Radio ===
| Year | Title | Role |
|---|---|---|
| 2001–2002 | At Home with the Snails | |
| 2002 | Les Misérables | Inspector Javert |
| 2005 | The Man Who Was Thursday | |
| 2005–2006 | High Table, Lower Orders | |
| 2007–2009 | The Maltby Collection | |
| 2009 | A Murder of Quality | |
| 2009 | The Screwtape Letters | C. S. Lewis |
| 2011–2012 | North by Northamptonshire | |
| 2011 | Two Pipe Problems: The Case of the Missing Meerschaum | Mortimer Tregennis |

=== Television ===
| Year | Title | Role | Notes |
|---|---|---|---|
| 1959–1960 | The Army Game | Various | 20 episodes |
| 1959–1961 | Probation Officer | Various | 4 episodes |
| 1959–1962 | Garry Halliday | Various | |
| 1960 | Arthur's Treasured Volumes | Detective Inspector | Episode: "A Blow in Anger" |
| 1960 | The Strange World of Gurney Slade | Television Studio Floor Manager | Pilot |
| 1960 | Interpol Calling | Colonel (uncredited) | Episode: "Desert Hijack" |
| 1960 | St. Ives | Gautier | 2 episodes |
| 1960 | Police Surgeon | Peter Hughes | Episode: "Smash But No Grab" |
| 1960 | The Odd Man trilogy | Constable Swift | 4 episodes |
| 1960–1963 | Bootsie and Snudge | Various | 13 episodes |
| 1961 | ITV Play of the Week | Peter | Episode: "Mrs. Skeffington" |
| 1962–1965 | The Avengers | Various | 4 episodes, including "Propellant 23" and "Man with Two Shadows" |
| 1962 | Top Secret | Captain Felipe | Episode: "The Eagle of San Gualo" |
| 1962 | No Hiding Place | DS Walsh | Episode: "Epitah for Johnnie" |
| 1962 | BBC Sunday-Night Play | Dr. Morgan | Episode: "What's in It for Walter" |
| 1962 | Harpers West One | Harry Adams | 1 episode |
| 1963 | The Edgar Wallace Mystery Theater | Dr. Tanfield | Episode: "Incident at Midnight" |
| 1963 | The Human Jungle | Williams | Episode: "The Vacant Chair" |
| 1963 | Suspense | Newspaper Reporter | Episode: "The Edge of Discovery" |
| 1963 | Drama 61-67 | Basil Mallard | Episode: "Drama '63: A Well Dressed Man" |
| 1963 | Thirty-Minute Theatre | Mr. Mott | Episode: "The Simple Truth" |
| 1963 | The Saint | Pete Ferguson | Episode: "The Rough Diamonds" |
| 1965 | Gideon's Way | Jeff Grant | Episode: "The Alibi Man" |
| 1965 | Out of the Unknown | Chief Officer | Episode: "No Place Like Earth" |
| 1965–1966 | Pardon the Expression | Hotel Manager/Mr. Bentley | 2 episodes |
| 1965–1966 | Public Eye | Donald Halston/Dr. Pringle | 2 episodes |
| 1965–1971 | Out of the Unknown | Various | 3 episodes |
| 1966 | Armchair Theatre | Rankin | Episode: "The Battersea Miracle" |
| 1966 | The Baron | Anstruther | 2 episodes |
| 1966 | The Man in Room 17 | Ian McWatt | Episode: "Under Influence" |
| 1966 | Sergeant Cork | James Meredith | Episode: "The Case of a Lady's Good Name" |
| 1966 | Mystery and Imagination | Turner | Episode: "The Beckoning Shadow" |
| 1966 | The Wednesday Play | Property Agent | Episode: Cathy Come Home |
| 1966 | The Rat Catchers | Various | 3 episodes |
| 1966 | ITV Sunday Night Theatre | Coroticus | Episode: "For Triumphant: St. Patrick" |
| 1966–1969 | Love Story | The Doctor/Oliver | 2 episodes |
| 1967 | Emergency Ward 10 | Gilbert Rockyer | Episode: "By the Mark Twelve" |
| 1967 | Mrs Thursday | Henry Baxter | Episode: "The Old School Tie Up" |
| 1967 | The Further Adventures of the Musketeers | Oliver Cromwell | 2 episodes |
| 1967 | The Revenue Men | Bill Mitchell | Episode: "The Present" |
| 1967–1968 | The Troubleshooters | Jeremy Martin | 2 episodes |
| 1967–1968 | City '68 | Robins | 3 episodes |
| 1967–1982 | ITV Playhouse | Various | 6 episodes |
| 1968 | Beggar My Neighbour | PC Stunt | Episode: "Let Sleeping Dogs Lie" |
| 1968 | Coronation Street | Superintendent Registrar | 1 episode |
| 1968 | Best of Enemies | Johnson | Pilot |
| 1968 | George and the Dragon | PC Footer | Episode: "The Football Match" |
| 1969 | Z-Cars | Barney French | Episode: "Special Duty: Part 2" |
| 1969 | Detective | Chief Superintendent Smeed | Episode: "Hunt the Peacock" |
| 1969 | Paul Temple | DI Dean | Episode: "There Must Be a Mr. X" |
| 1969–1971 | The Expert | Carter/Assistant Chief Constable Rogers | 3 episodes |
| 1969–1971 | Me Mammy | Mr. Cleaver/Mr. Purdy | 2 episodes |
| 1970, 1972, 2007 | Doctor Who | Various | Serials: "Doctor Who and the Silurians", "The Mutants" and "Voyage of the Damned" |
| 1970 | The Worker | Professor Robinson | Episode: "Now is the Time for All Left Legs" |
| 1970 | NBC Experiment in Television | Police Driver | Episode: "The Engagement" |
| 1970 | Ben Travers' Farces | Hugh Stafford/Sgt. Smithers | 2 episodes |
| 1970 | Softly, Softly: Task Force | Professor Brett | Episode: "The Lie Direct" |
| 1970–1972 | Doomwatch | Major Simms/Chief Superintendent Mallory | 2 episodes |
| 1970–1976 | BBC Play of the Month | Monteith/Graviter | 2 episodes |
| 1971 | ITV Saturday Night Theatre | Mac | Episode: "The Shopper" |
| 1971 | Now Take My Wife | Don Maxwell | Episode: "The Singing Garbo" |
| 1971–1976 | Play for Today | Various | 4 episodes |
| 1972 | The Shadow of the Tower | John Mayne | 2 episodes |
| 1972–1973 | Colditz | Doc | 2 episodes |
| 1973 | Six Days of Justice | Mr. Nicholas | Episode: "A Question of Discipline" |
| 1974 | The Liver Birds | Doctor | Episode: "Follow That Ring" |
| 1974 | The Prince of Denmark | Martin | 1 episode |
| 1975 | Churchill's People | Samuel Partridge | Episode: "The Liberty Tree" |
| 1975 | Comedy Playhouse | Ralph | Episode: "Going, Going, Gone...Free?" |
| 1975 | Whodunnit? | Major Culbertson | Episode: "Fly Me, I'm Dead" |
| 1975–1976 | Angels | Lawrence Rutherford | 3 episodes |
| 1976–1978 | Happy Ever After | Bob Holsgrove/Mr. Critchley | 2 episodes |
| 1976–1979 | The Fall and Rise of Reginald Perrin | Jimmy Anderson | |
| 1976 | Bill Brand | Malcolm Frear | 4 episodes |
| 1977 | Van der Valk | Head of Faculty | Episode: "The Professor" |
| 1978 | Scorpion Tales | Arnold Sparrow | Episode: "The Ghost in the Pale Blue Dress" |
| 1978 | The Sweeney | Commander Watson | Episode: "Feet of Clay" |
| 1978 | Crown Court | Kenneth Eden | Serial: "A Man with Everything" |
| 1978–1983 | Butterflies | Ben Parkinson | |
| 1978–1983 | The Professionals | Sinclair/Avery | 2 episodes |
| 1979 | Fawlty Towers | Dr. Price | Episode: "The Kipper and the Corpse" |
| 1979 | Bless Me, Father | Freddie Williams | Episode: "All at Sea" |
| 1980 | The Goodies | School Headmaster | Episode: "War Babies" |
| 1981 | Jackanory Playhouse | King | Episode: "The Toy Princess" |
| 1981 | BBC Television Shakespeare | Peter Quince | Episode: A Midsummer Night's Dream |
| 1981–1983 | The Last Song | Leo Bannister | |
| 1982 | Whoops Apocalypse | Foreign Secretary | 4 episodes |
| 1982–1983 | The Kenny Everett Television Show | Various | 2 episodes |
| 1983 | Death of an Expert Witness | Dr. Edwin Lorrimer | Miniseries |
| 1983 | Waters of the Moon | Robert Lancaster | |
| 1984–1986 | Fairly Secret Army | Major Harry Kitchener Wellington Truscott | |
| 1985 | Absurd Person Singular | Ronald | TV film |
| 1986 | Executive Stress | Donald Fairchild | Season one |
| 1986 | Season's Greetings | Bernard | TV film |
| 1986 | Screen Two | The Angry Doctor | Episode: "The Insurance Man" |
| 1986–1989 | Hot Metal | Harold Stringer | 7 episodes |
| 1988 | Christabel | Mr. Burton | Miniseries |
| 1989 | Blackadder Goes Forth | Field Marshal Douglas Haig | Episode: "Goodbyeee" |
| 1990 | Inspector Morse | Matthew Copley-Barnes | Episode: "The Infernal Serpent" |
| 1990 | Bergerac | Nigel Carter | Episode: "Roots of Evil" |
| 1991 | Screen One | Donleavy | Episode: "A Question of Attribution" |
| 1992–2005 | As Time Goes By | Lionel Hardcastle | |
| 1994 | The Inspector Alleyn Mysteries | Harold Cartell | Episode: "Hand in Glove" |
| 1995–1998 | Mr. Men and Little Miss | Narrator and Santa Claus | |
| 1996 | The Legacy of Reginald Perrin | Jimmy Anderson | TV film |
| 1998 | Alice through the Looking Glass | White King | TV film |
| 2001 | The Savages | Donald | |
| 2001 | The 1940s House | Narrator | |
| 2002 | Stig of the Dump | Robert | |
| 2003 | Absolute Power | Lord Harcourt | Episode: "Country Life" |
| 2003 | Looking for Victoria | Narrator | TV film |
| 2003–2004, 2006 | Grumpy Old Men | Narrator | |
| 2004 | He Knew He Was Right | Sir Marmaduke Rowley | TV film |
| 2008 | Ashes to Ashes | Lord Scarman | Episode 8 |
| 2008 | The Long Walk to Finchley | John Crowder | TV film |
| 2010 | Grandpa in My Pocket | Grandad Gillbert | Episode: "Captain Dumbletwit's Toughest Mission Yet!" |
| 2011 | Agatha Christie's Poirot | Vice Admiral Hamling | Episode: "The Clocks" |
| 2011 | Rev. | Martin | Christmas Special |
| 2012 | The Hollow Crown | Lord Chief Justice | Episode: Henry IV, Part II |
| 2014 | Royal Variety Performance | Announcer | |

=== Film ===
| Year | Title | Role | Notes |
|---|---|---|---|
| 1962 | A Prize of Arms | Cpl. Myers | |
| 1963 | Incident at Midnight | Dr. Tanfield | |
| 1964 | Ring of Spies | Police Officer | Uncredited |
| 1966 | Cast a Giant Shadow | David | Uncredited |
| 1973 | O Lucky Man! | Examinator Doctor/Basil Keyes | |
| 1976 | The Battle of Billy's Pond | First Policeman | |
| 1980 | The Outsider | Colonel Wyndham | |
| 1982 | Mr. Kershaw's Dream System | Psychiatrist | |
| 1983 | The Honorary Consul | Belfrage: British Ambassador | |
| 1985 | A Zed & Two Noughts | Fallast | |
| 1986 | Clockwise | Headmaster | |
| 1988 | A Fish Called Wanda | Judge | |
| 1988 | Hawks | SAAB Salesman | |
| 1994 | The Madness of King George | Warren | |
| 1997 | Mrs. Brown | Henry Ponsonby | |
| 1997 | Tomorrow Never Dies | Admiral Roebuck | |
| 1998 | Stiff Upper Lips | His Butler's Voice | |
| 1999 | Anna and the King | Lord John Bradley | |
| 1999 | The Comedy Trail: A Shaggy Dog Story | Lionel Hardcastle | TV special |
| 2000 | Rat | The Doctor | |
| 2003 | Peter Pan | Sir Edward Quiller Couch | |
| 2004 | Piccadilly Jim | Bayliss | |
| 2009 | The Pink Panther 2 | Joubert | |
| 2011 | W.E. | Stanley Baldwin | |
| 2011 | Lost Christmas | Dr. Clarence | |
| 2012 | Run for Your Wife | Man on Bus | |
| 2012 | Bert and Dickie | Charles Burnell | |
| 2014 | The Last Sparks of Sundown | Sir Buster Sparks | Voice |
| 2014 | Paddington | The Boss Geographer | |
| 2021 | To Olivia | Geoffrey Fisher | |

=== Recordings (spoken word) ===
| Year | Title |
|---|---|
| 1985 | Welcome to the Pleasuredome (Fruitness Mix) |
| 1989 | The BFG |
| 1990 | Esio Trot |
| 2005 | A Christmas Carol |
| 2007 | The Diary of a Nobody |
