= British sitcom =

British television situation comedy

A British sitcom (sometimes called a Britcom) is a situational comedy programme produced for British television.

British sitcoms have predominantly been recorded on studio sets, while some include an element of location filming. Live audiences and multi-cameras were first used in the US by Desi Arnaz and Lucille Ball for their American show I Love Lucy in 1951 and the system was adopted in the UK. Several are made almost entirely on location (for example, Last of the Summer Wine) and shown to a studio audience prior to final post-production to record genuine laughter. In contrast to the American team writing system, Ray Galton and Alan Simpson's huge successes were of such quality that they became the paradigm for British sitcom writing.

By the time the television set had become a common part of home furnishing, sitcoms were significant expressions of everyday life and were often a window on the times of enormous social changes in the British class system and its conflicts and prejudices. The period from 1970 to 1979 in particular is often considered the 'Golden Age' of British sitcom, with Fawlty Towers (1975 and 1979) being "the British sitcom by which all other British sitcoms must be judged".

A subset of British comedy consciously avoids traditional situation comedy themes, storylines, and home settings to focus on more unusual topics or narrative methods. Blackadder (1983–1989) and Yes Minister (1980–1988, 2013) moved what is often a domestic or workplace genre into the corridors of power. A later development was the mockumentary genre exemplified by series such as The Office (2001–2003).

The Office heralded the modern trend of the single-camera sitcom dispensing with live audiences. Since the turn of the century, many sitcoms had been filmed on a single-camera set-up or entirely on location, with no studio screening or laugh track, such as The Royle Family (1998–2000, 2006–2012), and PhoneShop (2009–2013). Later sitcoms such as 2009's Miranda used a traditional sitcom format featuring a live audience and multiple cameras.

A 2004 poll by the BBC, ITV, and Channel 4 in the 12-episode documentary series Britain's Best Sitcom, produced a list topped by traditional sitcoms with Only Fools and Horses holding the first place, and included favourites such as David Croft's Dad's Army, Are You Being Served?, and Hi-de-Hi!. It was not until The Royle Family (1998–2000) in place 19 that a show without a live studio audience was featured.

British Christmas TV programming has a long-standing tradition of heavily featuring comedy and sitcoms in the schedules, often with episodes that capture holiday spirit, and sometimes emotional moments. Christmas specials have allowed sitcoms such as The Royle Family and Only Fools and Horses which finished regular series programming to continue for over a decade.

From the late 1950s to the late 1980s situation comedy proved to be one of the richest sources of public discourse on class in British life. During the 30 years from the end of the 1950s to the late 1980s sitcom provided one of the best windows on the British class system.

Writing for the British Film Institute in 2003, Phil Wickham, film and TV critic and author of several books about British TV, concludes:

Sitcoms have had an important influence on British life in the last 40 years. They have made us think about ourselves by making us laugh at our own absurdity. Good sitcoms are a kind of virtual reality - they reflect the rhythms of everyday life, the pain of the human condition and, of course, the joy of laughter.

== Early years ==
=== Beginnings ===
The origins of British TV sitcoms trace back to radio comedies of the 1940s and 1950s like Hancock's Half Hour, which aired on BBC Radio in 1954, British TV sitcoms were initially inspired by American comedy formats, but they quickly developed their own style that highlighted dry wit, social satire, and the nuances of British life. Early shows of the 1950s often featured archetypal British characters such as the staff and pupils in Whack-O! and the various facets portrayed in Hancock's Half Hour, and set the stage for what would become the British TV sitcom genre. They were set in post World War II working-class or domestic environments, highlighting issues of class, family dynamics, and British culture, while The Army Game, ITV's first sitcom, parodied the life of army conscripts during the last years of the National Service which ended in 1963.

=== Pinwright's Progress ===
Written by Rodney Hobson, Pinwright's Progress (1946–1947) was the world's first regular half-hour televised sitcom. Broadcast live in black and white by the BBC from Alexandra Palace, it was about J. Pinwright, the proprietor of a small shop. Storylines involved his hated rival and his staff, who only added to his problems by attempting to be helpful. The series featured an ensemble cast including James Hayter as J. Pinwright, Clarence Wright as Aubrey, Daphne Maddox as Miss Peasbody, Doris Palmer as Mrs Sigsbee, and Leonard Sharp as Ralph. Further roles included Benita Lydal as Mrs Rackstraw, Charles Irwin as a salesman, and Jill Christie as Pinwright's daughter. and produced and directed by John Glyn-Jones. The script editor was Ted Kavanagh, who during the World War II years also wrote the BBC Radio comedy series It's That Man Again (ITMA ), which according to Foster and Furst was "entirely new, breaking away from the conventions of both radio and music hall comedy".

=== Hancock's Half Hour ===
Transferred to television in 1956 after 48 episodes on BBC radio which began in 1954, Hancock's Half Hour (1956–1961) by Galton and Simpson was the first modern TV sitcom. Whilst moving away from audio variety towards character development, the radio series had been influential in the development of TV situation comedy. The radio series continued to be produced alongside the TV version. Tony Hancock played a fictionalised version of himself, a loser whose plans and aspirations are continually ruined by bad luck. Its only other regular cast member was the more worldly sidekick played by Sid James, later of Carry On fame and Bless This House . Other occasional participants included John Le Mesurier (Dad's Army), Kenneth Williams, and Patricia Hayes. Hancock's biographer John Fisher dates the first use of the term 'situation comedy' in British broadcasting to a BBC memo dated 31 March 1953 from radio comedy producer Peter Eton, suggesting the format as the ideal vehicle for Hancock's comedic style. According to Phil Wickham, writing for the Britiah Film Institute, "Hancock's persona of the pompous loser out of his depth in an uncomprehending society still informs many programmes today". The final BBC series of this show was broadcast under the shorter title Hancock. In 1963, Hancock changed his writers and moved to ITV for a further 13-episode series also named Hancock. The series, though relatively well received, has been described as "clearly not up to the standard of [Hancock's] BBC work".

=== Whack-O! ===
Stars Jimmy Edwards in the lead role as Professor James Edwards, Whack-O! and was written by Frank Muir and Denis Norden. The series is about the drunken, gambling, devious, cane-swishing headmaster who tyrannised staff and children at the fictitious Chiselbury public school "for the sons of Gentlefolk". From 1956 to 1960 and 1971–1972, it ran for 60 episodes over 8 series. The first six episodes were subtitled "Six of the Best", alluding to the frequent and traditional punishment of disobedient pupils in the UK by caning which was the butt of many jokes. The BBC sums up this aspect of Whack-O! with: "Watching the series now is a little painful in one respect – we're too sensitive to find canings amusing – but it's right on the money in other ways, mainly because finding over-privileged kids vile hasn't gone out of fashion."

Only six of the original black-and-white episodes are known to exist. The series was revived in colour with updated scripts in 1971–72, slightly retitled Whacko! and with less emphasis on the caning. Other members of the cast included Arthur Howard (series 1–7),

Julian Orchard (series 8), Kenneth Cope, Norman Bird, John Stirling, Peter Glaze, Edwin Apps (series 1–7), Peter Greene (series 8), David Langford, Keith Smith, Brian Rawlinson, Gordon Phillot, Harold Bennett (Are You Being Served?), (series 8), Frank Raymond, Gary Warren (series 8), and Greg Smith (series 8). A feature film, Bottoms Up, was made in 1960.

=== The Army Game ===
Peter Eton's series of The Army Game (1957–1961) was probably British television's most successful sitcom of this period and ran for 154 episodes. Many of its stars went on to become household names. The original cast consisted of William Hartnell, Michael Medwin, Geoffrey Sumner, Alfie Bass, Charles Hawtrey, Bernard Bresslaw and Norman Rossington. The cast of The Army Game would change over the years with actors such as Geoffrey Palmer, Bill Fraser, Ted Lune, Frank Williams, Harry Fowler and Dick Emery appearing in subsequent series. The Army Game follows the exploits of Hut 29, a fictional dysfunctional group of conscripted National Service soldiers during the post-war years. Writers included creator Sid Colin, Larry Stephens, Maurice Wiltshire, Lew Schwarz, John Jowett, John Antrobus, John Foley, Marty Feldman, Barry Took, David Climie, David Cumming, Derek Collyer, Brad Ashton, John Junkin, Talbot Rothwell, Sidney Nelson, Stan Mars, Bob Perkins and Alan MacKinnon. At least three episodes are uncredited. In June 1959, a short The Army Game scene was performed by Michael Medwin, Alfie Bass, Norman Rossington, Bill Fraser and Ted Lune at the Royal Variety Performance in front of Queen Elizabeth The Queen Mother. This was the last Royal Variety Performance that was not televised. This successful series inspired a film spin-off, I Only Arsked! (1958), and in 1958, just a year after the series debuted, the first Carry On film, the very similar Carry On Sergeant, was released, also featuring Hawtrey, Rossington and Hartnell.

== The 1960s ==
=== Two channel TV ===
ITV sitcoms began with the channel's launch in 1957 and throughout the 1960s helped shape British comedy with varied and often experimental styles. In the 1960s, the BBC produced a then-rare workplace comedy with The Rag Trade (1961–1963; later revived by ITV, 1977–1978) written by Ronald Wolfe and Ronald Chesney. The success of the series was due partly to the strength of the female ensemble playing the workforce, who included Sheila Hancock, Barbara Windsor and Esma Cannon. It also made the earliest of Richard Waring's domestic comedies, Marriage Lines (1961–1966), starring Richard Briers (later to star in The Good Life) and Prunella Scales (who went on to star in Fawlty Towers), and Not in Front of the Children (1967–70), starring Wendy Craig. Women were usually only cast in secondary roles in this period, though several series with Craig in the lead were an exception. Sitcoms developed by Carla Lane, the first successful female writer in the form, began with The Liver Birds (1969–1979, 1996), initially in collaboration with others.

Another change, with Steptoe and Son (1962–65, 1970–74) and The Likely Lads (1964–1966), producers began to cast actors, rather than the comedians around whom earlier series like Whack-O!, with Jimmy Edwards, or Hancock's Half Hour, had been built.

=== Bootsie and Snudge ===
As a spin-off sequel to The Army Game and also starring Bill Fraser and Alfie Bass, Bootsie and Snudge, (1960–1963, 1974) was written by a large team over its 104 episodes. Writers for the 1960–63 episodes included Marty Feldman, Barry Took, John Antrobus, Ray Rigby, David Cumming, Derek Collyer, James Kelly, Peter Lambda, Tom Espie, Jack Rosenthal, Harry Driver, and Doug Eden. The 1974 series was written by David Climie, Ronnie Cass and Lew Schwarz. The series established the reputation of actor Clive Dunn, leading to his role as Corporal Jones in Dad's Army.

=== Marriage Lines ===
Running for 43 episodes over 5 series (1963–1966), first titled The Marriage Lines, Marriage Lines was written by Richard Waring and directed and produced by Robin Nash and Graeme Muir. The traditional domestic comedy about a young couple learning to cope with married life reflected social attitudes of the times, and provided its lead stars Richard Briers (The Good Life, Ever Decreasing Circles) and Prunella Scales (Fawlty Towers) with a significant boost to their careers. The supporting cast included Edward de Souza, Ronald Hines and Christine Finn.

=== Steptoe and Son ===
With its cast of only two regular characters played by Harry H. Corbett and Wilfrid Brambell, airing 1962–65 and 1970–74, Steptoe and Son was a Galton and Simpson creation and ran for 57 episodes over 8 series. Producers included Duncan Wood, John Howard Davies, Graeme Muir, and Douglas Argent. In 2000, the show was ranked number 44 on the 100 Greatest British Television Programmes compiled by the British Film Institute. In a 2001 Channel 4 poll Albert was ranked 39th on their list of the 100 Greatest TV Characters, The series was derived from a one-off Galton and Simpson comic play, "The Offer", shown on their BBC series Comedy Playhouse in 1962. It is regularly repeated and gave rise to four feature films.

=== Till Death Us Do Part ===
Written by Johnny Speight and broadcast 1965–1968 and 1972–1975 by the BBC for 54 episodes, Till Death Us Do Part featured Warren Mitchell as Alf Garnett and was an instant hit. Created by Johnny Speight, Till Death Us Do Part centred on the East End Garnett family, led by patriarch Alf Garnett (Warren Mitchell), a reactionary white working-class man who holds racist and anti-socialist views. His long-suffering wife Else was played by Dandy Nichols, and his daughter Rita (Una Stubbs) and her husband Mike Rawlins (Anthony Booth) is a socialist 'layabout' from Liverpool who frequently locks horns with Garnett. The show captured a key feature of Britain in the 1960s — the public perception that the generation gap was widening and addressed racial and political issues that had been becoming increasingly prevalent in British society. It became an instant hit because, although a comedy, it dealt with aspects of working-class life comparatively realistically and in the context of its time. It was criticised for its bad language by Mary Whitehouse a campaigner against social liberalism and the mainstream British media. Controversially, the show was one of the earliest mainstream programmes to feature the expletive "bloody" and was one of many perceived by Whitehouse as an example of the BBC's "moral laxity". Although in 2000, the show was ranked number 88 on the 100 Greatest British Television Programmes list compiled by the British Film Institute, due to changing attitudes in political correctness, it is seldom repeated.

=== Dad's Army ===
Based on a World War II theme, Dad's Army (1968–1977) in 80 episodes by Jimmy Perry and David Croft, was a gentle mockery of Britain's 'finest hour' and the Home Guard. One of the most enduring British sitcoms, its ensemble cast starred Arthur Lowe and John Le Mesurier, together with Clive Dunn, John Laurie, Ian Lavender, Arnold Ridley, Bill Pertwee, and James Beck (until his death). The interaction between Lowe's character Captain Mainwaring and Le Mesurier's Sgt Wilson was described by The Times as "a memorable part of one of television's most popular shows", During its original television run on BBC1, the show was nominated for multiple British Academy Television Awards, including "Best Situation Comedy" in 1973, 1974 and 1975, although only won "Best Light Entertainment Production Team" in 1971. In 2000, the show was voted 13th in a British Film Institute poll of industry professionals of the 100 Greatest British Television Programmes. In 2004, championed by Phill Jupitus, it came fourth in the BBC poll to find Britain's Best Sitcom. As of 2022 it is one of British television's most regularly repeated sitcoms.

=== All Gas and Gaiters ===
Bringing the first light-hearted satirical look at the church, during 1966–1971 All Gas and Gaiters paved the way for Bless Me, Father (1978–1981) with Arthur Lowe, and farcical ecclesiastical comedies such as Father Ted and The Vicar of Dibley in the 1990s. Starring Derek Nimmo with Robertson Hare, William Mervyn, John Barron, Joan Sanderson (Please Sir!, Fawlty Towers), and Ernest Clark, it was written by husband-and-wife team Pauline Devaney and Edwin Apps and directed by John Howard Davies and Stuart Allen. The successful series, which after an initial controversy became a favourite of Britain's clergy, was followed by two spin-offs also starring Nimmo: Oh, Brother! (1968–1970), 19 episodes written by David Climie and Austin Steele, with supporting roles by Sir Felix Aylmer, Patrick McAlinney and Derek Francis, and its sequel Oh, Father! (1973) with Felix Aylmer, Laurence Naismith, Pearl Hackney and David Kelly, also written by Climie and Steele. All Gas and Gaiters was produced by Stuart Allen, John Howard Davies, and Robin Nash, and the music was provided by Stanley Myers.

=== Me Mammy ===
With Milo O'Shea, and Yootha Joyce (Man About the House, George and Mildred) in the lead roles, Me Mammy was written by Hugh Leonard, produced by James Gilbert and Sydney Lotterby for the BBC and aired 1968–1971 for 21 episodes over 3 series. Bunjy Kennefick, played by O'Shea, is an Irish mother's boy living in London. He is a top executive of a company and lives a bachelor lifestyle. However, his old-fashioned Catholic mother often puts a stop to his plans, many of them involving his girlfriend Miss Argyll, played by Joyce.

=== Please Sir! ===
Created by John Esmonde and Bob Larbey Please Sir! features actors John Alderton (No, Honestly and Bless This House), Deryck Guyler, Penny Spencer, Joan Sanderson (Fawlty Towers), Noel Howlett, Erik Chitty and Richard Davies. Produced by London Weekend Television for ITV, the series based on a secondary school class of 16 year old pupils and their teacher, ran for 55 episodes between 1968 and 1972.As with many situation comedies of this era, a film version was developed and released in 1971. This was set in an outdoor pursuit centre, but starred most of the TV cast.

== The 1970s ==
=== The Golden Era ===
The 1970s is often regarded as the golden era of British sitcom. Following the Galton and Alan Simpson traditional sitcom format of an ensemble or a central character with a small supporting regular cast, the characters are constantly trapped in work or domestic situations from which there is no way out. Well-remembered series include John Cleese and Connie Booth's farcical Fawlty Towers (1975, 1979) often cited as the greatest sitcom of all time. John Esmonde and Bob Larbey's self-sufficiency comedy The Good Life (1975–78) and To the Manor Born by Peter Spence and Christopher Bond were also highly successful. Whatever Happened to the Likely Lads? (1973–74), a sequel to The Likely Lads set five years later, won a BAFTA Television Award for Best Situation Comedy. while its writers, Dick Clement and Ian La Frenais, provided Ronnie Barker with his most significant sitcom vehicle, Porridge (1974–77). Barker also starred (along with David Jason) in Open All Hours (1973, 1976–85), written by Roy Clarke, whose Last of the Summer Wine began in 1973 and ended in 2010, becoming the world's longest running sitcom. The decade also saw the broadcast of It Ain't Half Hot Mum (1974–81), which has been criticised for the "stereotypes of its handful of Indian supporting characters as alternately servile, foolish, lazy or devious".

The commercial station ITV had successes with Rising Damp (1974–78, sometimes called the best of all ITV sitcoms), Man About the House (1973–76) and George and Mildred (1976–79). Rising Damp star Leonard Rossiter also played the lead role in the BBC's The Fall and Rise of Reginald Perrin (1976–79). The decline in cinema attendance meant that many of these series were turned into cinema films; the first film version of On the Buses (1969–73) was the biggest hit at the British box office in 1971. According to Jeff Evans, On the Buses was a "cheerfully vulgar comedy" in which "leering and innuendo dominate[d]." Some of the network's other ratings successes from this era included Love Thy Neighbour (1972–76) and Mind Your Language (1977–79, 1986), which attempted to find humour in racial or ethnic conflict and misunderstandings, but were increasingly criticised over time for "obvious racial name-calling... recurring with distressing regularity" and "offer[ing] only the crudest caricatures".

Increasing relaxation in regard to the discussion of sex allowed farce and camp humour to become a familiar form in the 1970s and were used in series like Are You Being Served?, and comedian Frankie Howerd's Up Pompeii!, which ran for 16 episodes (1969–70, 1975, 1991) and starred several female stalwarts from the Carry On film series, including Barbara Windsor, Wendy Richard and Valerie Leon. A feature of the show which inspired three films was Howerd's frequent breaking of the fourth wall.

Other controversial topics for comedy included series written by Richard Waring. ...And Mother Makes Three (1971–73), and its sequel ...And Mother Makes Five (1974–76), starred Craig (who also co-wrote) as a widowed mother who eventually remarries a divorced single father. My Wife Next Door (1972), created by Brian Clemens, concerned a divorced couple who accidentally moved next door to each other, Miss Jones and Son (1977–78) was about a single mother, and Rings on Their Fingers (1978–80) was about a young, unmarried couple.

=== On the Buses ===
Ensemble cast of On the Buses

Another creation by Ronald Chesney and Ronald Wolfe is On the Buses, starring Reg Varney and Bob Grant in an ensemble cast with Anna Karen, Doris Hare, and Stephen Lewis (Oh, Doctor Beeching!, Last of the Summer Wine). Running 1969–1973 for 74 episodes over 7 series, it was initially rejected by the BBC, who did not see much comedy potential in a bus depot as a setting. It was then commissioned by Frank Muir, then at London Weekend Television who said it was "rather at the baked beans end of my menu". Despite poor critical reception, it gained an audience of up to 20 million. It has been described as cliche-ridden, stereotypical, occasionally racist and totally sexist by today's standards, with Varney's and Grant's characters both lecherous womanisers and ethnic minorities used inappropriately for humour. As David Stubbs wrote for The Guardian in 2008, Grant and Varney were playing "two conspicuously middle-aged men" (Varney was in his 50s when the series began) pursuing "an endless array of improbably available 'dolly birds' ". The series was made into three films, On the Buses (1971), Mutiny on the Buses (1972), and Holiday on the Buses (1973).

=== Bless This House ===
Starring Sid James of Carry On and Hancock's Half Hour fame as the father, with Diana Coupland as the mother, and Sally Geeson (also several Carry On films), and Robin Stewart as their teenage children, Bless This House is about a fairly typical, but somewhat slightly dysfunctional middle-class 1970s nuclear family. The comedy was created by Vince Powell and Harry Driver as a vehicle for James, but mainly written by others including Dave Freeman and Carla Lane. Running on ITV from 1971 to 1976 in 65 half-hour episodes over 10 series, it marked a departure from James' characteristic bawdy slapstick and famous 'dirty laugh'. The series ended abruptly in 1976, when, just four days after the broadcast of the final episode, James died after collapsing on stage. Ironically, James had told Coupland, "It's such fun and so successful, we'll still be working on Bless This House till one of us kicks the bucket." Bless This House came in 67th place in the BBC's 2004 100 Best British Sitcoms poll.

=== Clochemerle ===
In 1972 the lavish French farce in English based on the 1934 novel of the same name by Gabriel Chevallier, Clochemerle was adapted into 9 episodes by Galton and Simpson for the BBC. It was a stark contrast to the dark comedy of their Steptoe and Son and Hancock's Half Hour. Filmed on location in Colombier-le-Vieux, in the department of Ardèche, it starred Roy Dotrice, Wendy Hiller, Cyril Cusack, Kenneth Griffith, Cyd Hayman, Bernard Bresslaw, Hugh Griffith, Micheline Presle, Madeline Smith, Christian Roberts, Nigel Green, Wolfe Morris and Gordon Rollings, with narration by Peter Ustinov. The show was produced by Michael Mills as a co-production between the BBC and West Germany's Bavaria Film. Incidental music was arranged by Alan Roper and played by L'Harmonie Du Rhone Orchestra, Lyon, under the musical direction of Raymond Jarniat.

=== My Wife Next Door ===
Created by Brian Clemens and written by Richard Waring, My Wife Next Door was shown on BBC1 in 1972 and ran for 13 episodes. The series concerns George Basset, played by John Alderton, and Suzie Basset, played by Hannah Gordon, who each try to start afresh after their divorce by moving to the country, only to find that they have moved into adjoining cottages. The music was by Dennis Wilson. In 1973, one episode won a British Academy Television Award for Best Situation Comedy. During a repeat run in January 1980, one episode gained 19.3 million viewers and was the second most-watched programme that week.

=== Are You Being Served? ===
Cast of Are You Being Served?

Set in a fictional, traditional London department store, the show follows the antics of the staff of the retail ladies' and gentlemen's clothing departments . Known for its innuendo-laden humor, quirky characters, and catchphrases Are You Being Served? (1972–85) was one of the longest-running sitcoms of the era. It was created and written for the BBC by Jeremy Lloyd and David Croft and stars Frank Thornton (Last of the Summer Wine), Mollie Sugden, Wendy Richard, Nicholas Smith, and John Inman, who of the original cast were to appear in all 69 episodes and the same five later featured in the sequel spin-off Grace & Favourwhich aired in 1991–1992. Inman's camp characterisation of Mr. Humphries contributed greatly to the series' success. In 2004, it ranked 20th in Britain's Best Sitcom. The series proved to be highly exportable, and is regularly repeated on BBC Two, Drama and Gold in the UK, PBS and BBC America in the United States, and BBC UKTV, Fox Classics and 9Gem in Australia, and Jones! in New Zealand; as of 2024 it is also streamed on Britbox, Apple TV, and in the US on BritBox Amazon Channel. The series was nominated for the 1977 Best Situation Comedy BAFTA TV Award but the 1977 Are You Being Served? feature film starring the main cast was not well received. A one-off episode with a new cast was broadcast in 2016.

=== Man About the House ===
Considered daring at the time because it featured a man sharing a flat with two single women, the flat-share comedy Man About the House was created by Brian Cooke and Johnnie Mortimer. It starred Richard O'Sullivan, Paula Wilcox and Sally Thomsett, with Brian Murphy (Last of the Summer Wine) and Yootha Joyce as their landlord and landlady. 40 episodes were broadcast over six series on ITV, and ran from 1973 to 1976. The series is regularly repeated on ITV3. After the series ended in 1976, two successful spin-off series followed: George and Mildred, in which the Ropers move to the suburbs, and Robin's Nest, in which Robin gets married and opens a bistro. The 1977 Man About the House spin-off film which included guest stars Arthur Lowe, Bill Pertwee, Aimi MacDonald, and Spike Milligan (as himself), "acquits itself better than most movie spin-offs from TV series." Man About the House placed 69th out of 100 in a 2003 BBC poll to find Britain's Best Sitcom.

=== Some Mothers Do 'Ave 'Em ===
Broadcast on BBC One, created and written by Raymond Allen and starring Michael Crawford and Michele Dotrice, a total of 23 episodes of Some Mothers Do 'Ave 'Em were filmed which ran for two series in 1973, returning for a third series in 1978. Christmas specials were made in 1974 and 1975 and one-off special aired in a 2016. The series regularly garnered 25 million viewers and was broadcast in 60 countries. The episodes follow the hapless and maladroit Frank Spencer through his various attempts to get and keep a job, which frequently end in disaster, physical comedy, and complex and often dangerous stunts. Noted especially for its stunt work, performed by Crawford himself, it featured several well-known and much-lampooned catchphrases that have become part of British popular culture. In the 2004 series Britain's Best Sitcom, Some Mothers Do 'Ave 'Em placed 22nd in the list of all British sitcoms. The music was provided by composer Ronnie Hazlehurst.

=== Porridge ===
Based on life in a UK prison, the Porridge sitcom by writers Dick Clement and Ian La Frenais provided Ronnie Barker (Open All Hours), in the role of a prison inmate, with his most significant sitcom vehicle, supported by Richard Beckinsale (Rising Damp 1974-1978). It ran from 1974 to 1977 on BBC1 for 22 episodes over three series. The series features two major supporting characters, both prison officers: Mr Mackay, played by Fulton Mackay, and Mr Barrowclough, played by Brian Wilde. The sitcom focused on two prison inmates, Norman Fletcher, played by Barker, and Lennie Godber, played by Beckinsale, who are serving time in a fictional British prison. Porridge was critically acclaimed and was ranked No. 35 on the 100 Greatest British Television Programmes compiled by the British Film Institute in 2000. In 2004, Porridge placed seventh in Britain's Best Sitcom. Porridge was appreciated by British prisoners. Erwin James, an ex-prisoner who wrote a column for The Guardian, stated: "What fans could never know, however, unless they had been subjected to a stint of Her Majesty's Pleasure, was that the conflict between Fletcher and Officer Mackay was about the most authentic depiction ever of the true relationship that exists between prisoners and prison officers in British jails up and down the country. I'm not sure how, but writers Dick Clement and Ian La Frenais grasped the notion that it is the minor victories against the naturally oppressive prison system that makes prison life bearable."

=== Rising Damp ===
The ITV production of 28 episodes (1974–78) of Rising Damp written by Eric Chappell, is sometimes called the best of all ITV sitcoms. It starred Leonard Rossiter (The Fall and Rise of Reginald Perrin 1976) as Rigsby, a miserly, seedy, and ludicrously self-regarding landlord of a run-down Victorian townhouse who rents out his shabby bedsits to a variety of tenants: Ruth Jones, an unmarried woman approaching middle age, played by Frances de la Tour; Alan Moore, a medical student played by Richard Beckinsale (Porridge); and Philip Smith, a cultured sales representative supposedly descended from African royalty, played by Don Warrington. Chappell defended Rigsby by saying "[he]was not a racist or a bigot, but he was prejudiced and suspicious of strangers. But he accepted Philip and his only concern afterwards was that he didn't get a leg over Miss Jones." Warrington who was born in Trinidad, stated: "There were certain aspects of it that were politically incorrect. On the other, you can see how it held up a mirror to the way we were living." The series won the 1978 BAFTA for Best Situation Comedy and was the highest-ranking ITV sitcom in the BBC's Britain's Best Sitcom, coming in 27th overall. Frances de la Tour received an Evening Standard British Film Award in the category of "Best Actress" for her performance as Ruth Jones.

=== Happy Ever After ===
Broadcast 1974–1979 on BBC1 for 41 episodes over 5 series, starring Terry Scott and June Whitfield (Absolutely Fabulous and Last of the Summer Wine), with Beryl Cooke, Happy Ever After was written by John T. Chapman, Eric Merriman, Christopher Bond, John Kane and Jon Watkins. It was based on a Comedy Playhouse pilot called "Happy Ever After" which aired on 7 May 1974. Scott and Whitfield play the archetypal suburban sitcom marriage of a middle-class couple who find themselves alone when their grown-up daughters leave home. However, they are not alone for long as Aunt Lucy comes to live with them, along with her talking mynah bird. The show was followed with Terry and June (1979-1987), with Scott and Whitfield reprising their roles for a further 65 episodes in 9 series.

=== The Good Life ===
The Good Life (1975–1978), written by Bob Larbey and John Esmonde, aired on BBC1 for 30 episodes over four series and two specials. The final episode was recorded in the presence of Queen Elizabeth II to mark her Silver Jubilee; it was reputedly one of her favourite shows. Felicity Kendal and Richard Briers starred as Barbara and Tom Goode – a middle-class suburban couple who decide to quit the rat race and become self-sufficient, much to the consternation of their snooty but well-meaning neighbour Margo, played by Penelope Keith (To the Manor Born), and her down-to-earth husband Jerry, played by Paul Eddington (Yes Minister). The opening theme was composed by Burt Rhodes. In 2004, The Good Life came 9th in Britain's Best Sitcom. After its success, the four main cast members were given their own "vehicles" commissioned by the then Head of Comedy and producer of The Good Life, John Howard Davies. The series provided Felicity Kendal with her big break on television and significantly boosted her career on stage.

=== Fawlty Towers ===
Described in the BBC's profile of the show as "the British sitcom by which all other British sitcoms must be judged", Fawlty Towers (1975 and 1979) is eminently quotable; the repetition in the episode known as The Germans of 'don't mention the war' has become a catch phrase." In two series, only 12 half-hour episodes were made, because the writers, John Cleese and his then wife Connie Booth, felt that they could not continue to write comedy of the same quality. The series starred Cleese as Basil Fawlty, Prunella Scales as Sybil Fawlty, Connie Booth as Polly Sherman, and Andrew Sachs as Manuel. Supporting roles included Major Gowen, played by Ballard Berkeley, Chef Terry, played by Brian Hall, and Miss Gatsby and Miss Tibbs, played by Renee Roberts and Gilly Flower. Other well known guests from stage and screen, usually two or three for each episode, were featured in various episodes and among many others included Yvonne Gilan, Conrad Phillips, Bernard Cribbins, James Cossins, Allan Cuthbertson, Ann Way, Brenda Cowling, Joan Sanderson, Elspet Gray, Geoffrey Palmer, Derek Royle, Richard Davies, Ken Campbell, Una Stubbs, and John Quarmby. The show was produced by John Howard Davies and Douglas Argent, directed by Davies and Bob Spiers and the music was by Dennis Wilson. The show was ranked first on a list of the 100 Greatest British Television Programmes drawn up by the British Film Institute in 2000, and in 2019 it was named the greatest ever British TV sitcom by a panel of comedy experts compiled by the Radio Times. Basil Fawlty has been listed by Channel 4 as the second greatest television character.

=== George and Mildred ===
The spin-off from Man About the House, starring Yootha Joyce and Brian Murphy, with Norman Eshley, Sheila Fearn, and child star Nicholas Bond-Owen, a domestic sitcom George and Mildred is focused on a clash of social class. Written by Brian Cooke and Johnnie Mortimer, it ran for 38 episodes and is regularly repeated on ITV3. Yootha Joyce died suddenly in August 1980, just before production of a sixth and final series.

=== Open All Hours ===
Created and written by Roy Clarke for the BBC, Open All Hours ran for 26 episodes in four series (1976, 1981, 1982 and 1985) and starred Ronnie Barker (Porridge) and David Jason (Only Fools and Horses), with a regular supporting cast including Lynda Baron, Stephanie Cole (Waiting for God 1990), Barbara Flynn, Maggie Ollerenshaw, and Kathy Staff. The programme, produced and directed by Sydney Lotterby and developed from a television pilot broadcast in Barker's comedy anthology series Seven of One (1973), centred around the antics of the eccentric and miserly owner of a traditional English corner shop. Barker took his idea for Arkwright's famous stutter from the 1950s writer and performer Glenn Melvyn. Open All Hours came 8th in the 2004 Britain's Best Sitcom poll. Although it ended in 1985, Open All Hours had been repeated over 3,000 times by 2021. The theme tune was composed by Joseph Ascher (1829–1869), arranged for a brass band and performed by Max Harris, who also wrote the incidental music. A sequel, Still Open All Hours, with David Jason and many members of the original cast, began airing nearly 30 years later in 2013 and ran until 2019 for 41 episodes.

=== Miss Jones and Son ===
First broadcast on ITV in 1977 and running for 12 episodes, Miss Jones and Son (1977–78) was written by Richard Waring and produced and directed by Peter Frazer-Jones. It starred Paula Wilcox (Man About the House), Christopher Beeny, Charlotte Mitchell and Norman Bird. The series depicted the life of Elizabeth Jones, played by Wilcox, a young woman coming to terms with the responsibility of looking after her baby alone. Emotional support came in the form of next-door-neighbour and friend Geoffrey, played by Beeny. Difficulties included the reproaches of her parents, played by Mitchell and Bird, a difficult social life, and a reduced income. The theme song, "Bright Idea", was written by Roger Webb.

=== Rings on Their Fingers ===
Also written by Richard Waring, Rings on Their Fingers (1978–80) ran from 1978 to 1980 for 20 episodes in 3 series and was and produced by Harold Snoad for the BBC. It concerns a young unmarried couple, Sandy Bennett, played by Diane Keen, and Oliver Pryde, played by Martin Jarvis. The cast also included Tim Barrett, Barbara Lott, Anna Dawson, John Kane and Royce Mills. Sandy wishes to marry whereas Oliver is happy to remain unmarried. During the first series they do marry and in the second series they adjust to married life. A proposed fourth series would have concerned Sandy becoming pregnant unexpectedly, and Sandy and Oliver adapting to parenthood, but the series was not re-commissioned.

=== To the Manor Born ===
Co-starring Penelope Keith (The Good Life 1975) as Audrey fforbes-Hamilton and Peter Bowles (Only When I Laugh 1979) as Richard DeVere, To the Manor Born (1979–1981, 2007) was a 'feel-good' series of 20 episodes in three series plus two Christmas specials. The series follows the leading characters' 'will-they-won't they' love story written by Peter Spence and Christopher Bond and produced and directed by Gareth Gwenlan, The sitcom had one of the largest audience ratings of the period. The final episode of series 1, which aired on 11 November 1979, was the most watched British television programme (excluding live events) of the 1970s, drawing 23.95 million viewers. The final episode in 1981 received 17.80 million viewers. A second Christmas special aired at 9.30 pm on BBC1 on Christmas Day, 25 December 2007 and is themed around Audrey's and Peter's silver wedding anniversary (25 years). The series has been repeated over 1,000 times. Major supporting roles were played by Angela Thorne as Audrey's friend Marjory and Daphne Heard as Mrs Polouvicka, Richard's mother. Other members of the cast included Alan David, John Rudling, Michael Bilton, Gerald Sim, Michael Cochrane, and Georgie Glen. In 2004, it came ninth in Britain's Best Sitcom. The music was written by Ronnie Hazlehurst.

=== Terry and June ===
Spun off from Happy Ever After after it ended, Terry Scott and June Whitfield returned to star in the 65 episodes in the nine series of Terry and June (1979–1987). It was mostly written by John Kane. Chapman, one of the original writers, said that the original programme had run out of ideas and had to end. BBC Comedy, however, were unwilling to end a successful 'cozy' show, and so brought in fresh new writers; for legal reasons the programme title had to be changed, and, on 24 October 1979, Terry and June was born. It was similar to Happy Ever After without Aunt Lucy, but Terry and June's surname changed from Fletcher to Medford and the characters moved to Purley in London. Despite being seen as "cosy" and somewhat "dated" even upon its original broadcast, and lampooned by contemporaneous alternative comedy programmes, the show nevertheless attracted large viewing figures. The BBC became "slightly embarrassed of their 'safe and cosy' sitcom but one which still commanded strong audience figures" and allowed the show to peter out. In 2004, it came 73rd in Britain's Best Sitcom, jointly with Happy Ever After.

=== Butterflies ===
Written by Carla Lane who had previously created the successful The Liver Birds sitcom, the Butterflies series which ran on BBC2 for 27 episodes plus 2 specials in from November 1978 to October 1983, is about the day-to-day life of a comfortable middle-class family treated in a bittersweet style. The show stars Wendy Craig (Not in Front of the Children (1967–1970), ...And Mother Makes Three (1971–1973), and ...And Mother Makes Five from 1974 to 1976), as Rita, a non-working wife in a mid-life crisis, with Geoffrey Palmer (The Fall and Rise of Reginald Perrin and As Time Goes By) as her dentist and amateur lepidopterist husband. The main theme is Rita's friendship with her secret confidant Leonard, a divorced businessman who wants an affair with her, played by Bruce Montague, and the coming of age of her two teenage sons, Adam played by Nicholas Lyndhurst (co-star of the BBC sitcom Only Fools and Horses), and Russell played by Andrew Hall. The show received a BAFTA nomination for Best Television Comedy Series in 1981.

=== The Fall and Rise of Reginald Perrin ===
The classic BBC black comedy The Fall and Rise of Reginald Perrin (1976 to 1979) of 22 episodes in three series based on novels by David Nobbs stars Leonard Rossiter of Rising Damp fame (1974-1978), supported by a cast comprising Pauline Yates (Keep It in the Family, 1980) as Elizabeth Perrin), John Barron as C.J., Sue Nicholls as Joan Greengross), John Horsley as Doc Morrissey, Trevor Adams as Tony Webster, Bruce Bould as David Harris-Jones, and Geoffrey Palmer (Butterflies (1978-1983), As Time Goes By (1992-2005), and Fawlty Towers) as Jimmy. Nobbs adapted the screenplay for the first series from the first novel. The story concerns a middle-aged middle manager, Reginald "Reggie" Perrin who suffers a midlife crisis, tries to escape the pointlessness of his job and is driven to bizarre behaviour. The sitcom was a departure from the many middle-class suburban family life sitcoms of the era. The music was provided by Ronnie Hazlehurst, prolific composer of sitcom theme tunes. Despite being hugely popular it was only nominated for two BAFTA awards and won none, but received glowing reviews even decades later. Its popularity is evidenced by the follow-ons and the 2-series remake 30 years later. Simon Heffer writing in The Daily Telegraph in 2016 explains why: "It [the BBC] took a problem common to the silent majority and explored it sensitively, but with brilliant humour. That was why Perrin was so popular in its day, and why if one watches the box set now, 40 years later, it transmits through wit something timelessly relevant". A fourth series also by Nobbs, The Legacy of Reginald_Perrin, made more than a decade after Leonard Rossiter's death, comprised all the central characters of the earlier series, but without Rossiter and Adams shows Reggie's legacy – a fortune left to friends and family, but with strange conditions. Running for two series through 2009 and 2010, a modern remake of the series titled simply Reggie Perrin was written by David Nobbs and Simon Nye starring Martin Clunes (Doc Martin) in the BBC revival with Wendy Craig (Butterflies 1978–1983), Fay Ripley, Geoffrey Whitehead, Neil Stuke, and Lucy Liemann in supporting roles.

=== Come Back Mrs. Noah ===
The sci-fi sitcom Come Back Mrs. Noah, set in space in 2050, was broadcast on BBC1 from 17 July to 14 August 1978, with a pilot being aired on 13 December 1977, but it was not a success and ran for only six episodes. Although written by Jeremy Lloyd and David Croft, and featuring an all-star sitcom cast including Mollie Sugden (Are You Being Served?), Ian Lavender (Dad's Army), Gorden Kaye ('Allo 'Allo!), Donald Hewlett (It Ain't Half Hot Mum and You Rang, M'Lord?) and Michael Knowles (It Ain't Half Hot Mum and You Rang, M'Lord?), along with Vicki Michelle ('Allo 'Allo!) and Harold Bennett (Dad's Army and Are You Being Served?), some regarded it as one of the worst British sitcoms ever made. It has never been repeated. Writing in The British Comedy Guide on 27 June 2021, in his article "Stranger Things: When sitcoms strain to be different", citing in detail three examples including Come Back Mrs. Noah, Graham McCann explains how a sitcom, even when written, produced and acted by a highly successful team, can go horribly wrong.

== The 1980s ==
=== The alternatives' incursion ===
In the 1980s, the emerging alternative comedians began to develop sitcoms, partly as a response to series such as Terry and June (1979–87), with their "complacent gentility, outmoded social attitudes and bourgeois sensibilities". With 'alternative' comedy now almost the mainstream, suburban family sitcoms were increasingly unfashionable by the end of the 1980s. The alternatives' incursion began with The Young Ones (1982–84), written by Rik Mayall, Ben Elton and others. To help make it stand out, the group opted to combine traditional sitcom style with violent slapstick, non-sequitur plot turns, and surrealism. These older styles were mixed with the working and lower-middle class attitudes of the growing 1980s alternative comedy boom. Mayall was also the star of The New Statesman (1987–92), a series created by Maurice Gran and Laurence Marks, whose biggest success, Birds of a Feather (1989–98, 2014–20), also deviated from British practice in being scripted by a team of writers. The alternative comedy genre continued with Blackadder (1983–89), mainly written by Ben Elton and Richard Curtis and starring Rowan Atkinson, Tony Robinson, Tim McInnerny, Miranda Richardson, Stephen Fry and Hugh Laurie. Atkinson's Edmund Blackadder came at number three in the Channel 4 list of 100 greatest television characters. Other high-ratings mainstream, slice-of-life shows of the decade included Bread (1986–1991) written by Carla Lane, about a close-knit, working-class family in Liverpool. Running for 74 episodes, at its peak it attracted 21 million viewers. Another notable series was the science fiction comedy Red Dwarf (1988–), while 'Allo 'Allo! another Croft and Lloyd creation is set in German occupied France during World War II.

=== Yes Minister ===
Starring Paul Eddington, with Nigel Hawthorne and Derek Fowlds in the supporting roles, Yes Minister which ran for 21 episodes on BBC2 (1980–1984), and its sequel Yes, Prime Minister (1986–88), which ran for 16 episodes, were political satires. Established Shakespearean actor Hawthorne picked up four BAFTA TV Awards for Best Light Entertainment Performance for his role. Created by Antony Jay and Jonathan Lynn, the series received several BAFTAs and in 2004 was voted sixth in the Britain's Best Sitcom poll. Writer Michael Dobbs said Jay and Lynn "really got to the heart of so much of what goes on in Whitehall and Westminster". As the series revolved around the inner workings of central government, most of the scenes take place privately in offices and exclusive members' clubs. Lynn said that "there was not a single scene set in the House of Commons because government does not take place in the House of Commons. Some politics and much theatre takes place there. Government happens in private. As in all public performances, the real work is done in rehearsal, behind closed doors. Then the public and the House are shown what the government wishes them to see." Lynn and Jay explained: "After we wrote the episode, we would show it to some secret sources, always including somebody who was an expert on the subject in question. They would usually give us extra information which, because it was true, was usually funnier than anything we might have thought up." In a 2004 BBC programme paying tribute to the series, it was revealed that Jay and Lynn had drawn on information provided by two insiders from the governments of Harold Wilson and James Callaghan, namely Marcia Falkender and Bernard Donoughue. The series was the favourite television programme of the then Prime Minister, Margaret Thatcher. In 2012, Prime Minister David Cameron admitted that "I can tell you, as prime minister, it is true to life."

=== Hi-de-Hi! ===
Set in 1959–60 in a fictional holiday camp, Hi-de-Hi! was filmed on location at the real Warner's Holiday Centre at Dovercourt Bay. It ran for 58 episodes in 9 series (1980–1988) on the BBC and is often repeated. It was co-written by Jimmy Perry, based on his experience as a Butlin's Redcoat, and director-producer David Croft. With its ensemble cast comprising Paul Shane, Simon Cadell, Ruth Madoc, Jeffrey Holland, Su Pollard, and David Griffin, the series gained large audiences and won a BAFTA for Best Comedy Series in 1984. In a 2008 poll on Channel 4, "Hi-de-Hi!" was voted the 35th most popular comedy catchphrase. According to comedy researcher Mark Lewisohn, "Plots became somewhat outlandish during the latter episodes and by the time the BBC called it a day in 1988, it is arguable that the show had already outstayed its welcome by a good couple of years. All in all, though, this was a good British sitcom."

=== Only Fools and Horses ===
One of the most successful British sitcoms of all time, Only Fools and Horses (1981–2003) starred David Jason as Derek "Del Boy" Trotter and Nicholas Lyndhurst as his younger brother Rodney. It began in 1981 and ran for 64 episodes, with specials, until 2003. It was the most durable of several series written by John Sullivan. The 1996 episode "Time on Our Hands" (originally billed as the last episode) holds the record for the highest UK audience for a sitcom episode, attracting 24.3 million viewers. A ratings success with viewers, the series received numerous awards, including recognition from BAFTA, the National Television Awards and the Royal Television Society, as well as winning individual accolades for Sullivan and Jason. It was voted Britain's Best Sitcom in a 2004 BBC poll. In a 2001 Channel 4 poll Del Boy was ranked fourth on their list of the 100 Greatest TV Characters. The series influenced British culture, contributing several words and phrases to the English language. It was named one of the top 20 cult television programmes of all time by TV critic Jeff Evans. Evans spoke of: "[shows] such as Only Fools and Horses, which gets tremendous viewing figures but does inspire conventions of fans who meet in pubs called the Nag's Head and wander round dressed as their favourite characters." The theme music was by Ronnie Hazlehurst (1981) and John Sullivan (1982–2003). Only Fools and Horses came top in a research and analysis by a team of scientists led by Dr Helen Pilcher, a molecular neurobiologist and stand-up comedian with a speciality in scientific humour.

=== Last of the Summer Wine ===
Running on the BBC for 295 episodes over 31 series and four decades, Last of the Summer Wine (1973–2010) was entirely written by Roy Clarke (Keeping Up Appearances, Open All Hours and Still Open All Hours) and produced by Alan J. W. Bell, with music by Ronnie Hazelhurst. It is the longest-running comedy programme in Britain and the longest-running sitcom in the world. The family-friendly show was about the antics of a group of male pensioners looking for adventure, "portraying the elderly in a positive and non-stereotypical light." The show was filmed largely in the small town of Holmfirth in Yorkshire, a location recommended by Barry Took, and surrounding countryside. and features Bill Owen, 186 episodes, Peter Sallis, 295 episodes, and Kathy Staff, 245 episodes, along with Thora Hird, 152 episodes (Bootsie and Snudge), Stephen Lewis, 135 episodes, (On the Buses), Frank Thornton, 135 episodes (Are You Being Served?), Brian Murphy, 73 episodes, (Man About the House, George and Mildred), Josephine Tewson, 62 episodes, (Keeping Up Appearances), Dora Bryan, 50 episodes, (Happily Ever After), June Whitfield, 44 episodes, (Absolutely Fabulous, Father, Dear Father, Terry and June), Trevor Bannister, 25 episodes, (Are You Being Served?), and over the years included many other actors for a total cast of 459.

It later became the first comedy series to completely do away with studio sets and a live audience, moving all filming to Holmfirth. The episodes were then shown to preview audiences, whose laughter was recorded for a laugh track to avoid the use of canned laughter. Last of the Summer Wine was nominated numerous times for British television industry awards; it was proposed five times between 1973 and 1985 for the British Academy Film Awards, twice for the Best Situation Comedy Series award (in 1973 and 1979) and three times for the Best Comedy Series award (in 1982, 1983, and 1985). The show was also considered for the National Television Awards four times since 1999 (in 1999, 2000, 2003, and 2004), each time in the Most Popular Comedy Programme category. In 1999 the show won the National Television Award for Most Popular Comedy Programme. Repeated over 17,000 times, it is regularly broadcast on Gold, Yesterday, and Drama. It is also seen in more than 25 countries.

=== Ever Decreasing Circles ===
On BBC1 for four series and one feature-length special, Ever Decreasing Circles (1984–1989) was made in a total of 27 episodes. It was written by John Esmonde and Bob Larbey, and it reunited them with Richard Briers, of their previous hit show The Good Life. Sydney Lotterby directed 13 episodes and 14 episodes were produced by Harold Snoad. The show also featured guest appearances by Peter Blake, Ronnie Stevens, Victoria Burgoyne and Ray Winstone. Centred around Martin Bryce, the eccentric mover and shaker of his local community who feels threatened by the verve and aplomb of a new arrival in the village, played by Peter Egan. Its handling was much less brash than most sitcoms, and The Guardian described it as having "a quiet, unacknowledged and deep-running despair to it that in retrospect seems quite daring". Reappraising the series, Andy Dawson observed that "Ever Decreasing Circles strayed far from the well-worn path that other Britcoms trudged along in the 70s and 80s. There was a very real darkness at the heart of it, with Martin existing in what was almost certainly a state of permanent mental anguish." The show was voted number 52 in the BBC's Britain's Best Sitcom poll in 2003. At its peak, it attracted television audiences of around 12 million.

=== 'Allo 'Allo! ===
Reminiscent of their 1970s sitcoms such as Are You Being Served?, It Ain't Half Hot Mum, and Dad's Army, 'Allo 'Allo! was another creation of the writer/producer team of David Croft and Jeremy Lloyd. Set in Nazi-occupied France and starring Gorden Kaye as René, a café owner, 85 episodes aired on BBC1 in nine series. Croft and Lloyd, who wrote the first six series (the rest were scripted by Lloyd and Paul Adam) devised the concept as a farcical parody of wartime dramas Secret Army (BBC, 1977-1979) and Enemy at the Door (ITV, 1978-80), from which many elements were directly taken including actors Richard Marner, Guy Siner, John D. Collins and Hilary Minster. Although it did not have the success of Dad's Army, despite its sometimes tasteless gags and innuendo it gained respectable ratings, and was adapted to a long-running stage play and is frequently repeated. The series was successfully sold to Germany, possibly because its Nazis were depicted 'as harmlessly pervy and bumbling'. A special entitled The Return of 'Allo 'Allo! aired in 2007, featuring cast members reprising their original roles in a special story, with a documentary including highlights of episodes and interviews with the cast, production team and fans.

=== The Mistress ===
Starring Felicity Kendal (The Good Life) and Jane Asher, The Mistress (1985–1987) aired on BBC2 for 12 episodes and was written by Carla Lane. Kendal played Maxine, a young florist having an affair with a married man, whose wife was played by Asher. The series was produced and directed by Gareth Gwenlan. Series 2 attempted to broaden its scope, serving as a more general comedy while still retaining the thread of the affair.

=== Chelmsford 123 ===
Running for only 13 episodes, Chelmsford 123 (1988–1990), was a short-lived series set in Roman Britain about a young Roman general punished by the Emperor by being sent to govern cold, miserable Britannia, populated by hordes of drunken hooligans. Created and written by Jimmy Mulville and Rory McGrath, and starring themselves with Philip Pope and Neil Pearson, it has fallen into relative obscurity. Both series are nevertheless available on All 4.

== The 1990s ==
The new Channel 4 began to have successful long-running situation comedies. Desmond's (1989–94) was the first British sitcom with a black cast set in the workplace, and Drop the Dead Donkey (1990–98) brought topicality to the form as it was recorded close to transmission. Oh, Doctor Beeching (1995–1997) was the last of many sitcoms by producer David Croft.

Some of the biggest hits of the 1990s were Men Behaving Badly, Game On, 2point4 Children, I'm Alan Partridge, Goodnight Sweetheart, Bottom, The Brittas Empire, The Thin Blue Line, Mr. Bean and One Foot in the Grave.

=== Jeeves and Wooster ===
The "Jeeves" stories by novelist P. G. Wodehouse were made into Jeeves and Wooster (1990–1993), a comedy-drama series in sitcom style. Twenty-three episodes in 4 series were adapted by Clive Exton for ITV, starring Stephen Fry and Hugh Laurie, already well known writers and double act stars of their own sketch comedy television series A Bit of Fry & Laurie. The productions were well received. The third series won a British Academy Television Award for Best Design for Eileen Diss. The final series won a British Academy Television Award for Best Graphics for the Art Deco animated title by Derek W. Hayes and was nominated for a British Academy Television Award for Best Drama Series; it also earned a British Academy Television Award for Best Original Television Music for Anne Dudley's jazz-swing compositions accompanying the title sequence and the incidental music, and a British Academy Television Award for Best Costume Design for Dany Everett. In retrospect, Michael Brooke of BFI Screenonline called screenwriter Exton "the series' real star", saying his "adaptations come surprisingly close to capturing the flavour of the originals" by "retaining many of Wodehouse's most inspired literary similes." Writing in Art of the Title, Lola Landekic commends Hayes' Art Deco opening, saying "[it] provided a modern and elegant cornerstone, easing audiences into the rhythm and tone of the show."

=== Waiting for God ===
Written by Michael Aitkens, produced by Gareth Gwenlan, and directed by Gwenlan and Sue Bysh, Waiting for God (1990–1994) ran on BBC1 for 47 episodes over 5 series and was a major success. It starred Stephanie Cole as Diana Trent and Graham Crowden as Tom Ballard, two elderly but spirited residents of Bournemouth's fictional Bayview Retirement Home, who are determined not to grow old gracefully, and spend their time running rings around the home's oppressive management and their own families. With Janine Duvitski in the main supporting role and a regular cast including Andrew Tourell, Sandra Payne, Michael Bilton and Paddy Ward, much of the humour was derived from flying in the face of expectations about how the elderly ought to behave. The show became very successful, and came 37th in the 2004 poll to find Britain's Best Sitcom. It is frequently repeated on the Drama and Gold channels.

=== Keeping Up Appearances ===
The frequently repeated and highly successful series Keeping Up Appearances (1990–1995, 1997, 2008), was written by Roy Clarke. The show, which comprised five series and 44 episodes, including four Christmas specials, starred Patricia Routledge as the snobbish Hyacinth 'Bouquet' Bucket, Clive Swift, playing her husband, and Josephine Tewson, playing her neighbour, with Judy Cornwell, Mary Millar and Geoffrey Hughes as her working class relatives. The theme music was composed by Nick Ingman. It is the BBC's most exported television programme, having been sold nearly 1,000 times to overseas broadcasters. As of 2016 Keeping Up Appearances is the most-bought BBC and has outsold every other show to international broadcasters in the past 40 years. According to Roy Clarke : "...the secret to her wide fan base is that everyone knows a Hyacinth" In a 2004 BBC poll it placed 12th in Britain's Best Sitcom and in a 2001 Channel 4 poll, Hyacinth Bucket was ranked 52nd on their list of the 100 Greatest TV Characters. Production ended after Routledge decided to move on to other projects.

=== Absolutely Fabulous ===
Written by Jennifer Saunders and starring herself and Joanna Lumley, with Julia Sawalha and June Whitfield in supporting roles, Absolutely Fabulous (1992–2012) was based on the French and Saunders sketch "Modern Mother and Daughter". It ran for 39 episodes with the first three series airing on BBC, followed a two-part special finale entitled The Last Shout in 1996. Saunders played Edina Monsoon, a heavy-drinking, drug-abusing PR agent who spends her time in a desperate attempt to stay young and "hip", and Lumley played fashion magazine director Patsy Stone, whose drug abuse and alcohol consumption far eclipsed Edina's. It returned for two more series and two one-hour specials from 2001 to 2004. In 1997, the pilot episode, "Fashion", was ranked #47 on TV Guide's "100 Greatest Episodes of All-Time" list. A scene from the show was included in the TV's 100 Greatest Moments programme broadcast by Channel 4 in 1999. In 2000, the show was ranked 17th in the greatest British television show of all time by the BFI. In 2004 and 2007, the show was ranked 24th and 29th on TV Guide's "Top Cult Shows Ever" list. In 2019, the series ranked 9th in Radio Times' top 20 British sitcoms. The series has a 96% rating on Rotten Tomatoes, and Absolutely Fabulous: The Movie, was released in 2016.

=== If You See God, Tell Him ===
The BBC1 mini-series of If You See God, Tell Him (1993), broadcast in four 45-minute episodes written by Andrew Marshall and David Renwick, stars Richard Briers (The Good Life), Adrian Edmondson, Imelda Staunton and Martin Clunes. The humour concerns a man who bumps his head and starts believing he must do everything adverts tell him, with catastrophic results. The Independent wrote: "It's not really a disaster but there's something decidedly uneven underfoot here, a feeling that this is the working model for a new type of comedy rather than the finished product. [...] while it's sustained with considerable energy by the actors and direction you have to doubt whether it really stands up for one episode, let alone four." Conversely, a retrospective review in The Guardian highlighted the series as "a gem from an era when the BBC took its black comedy seriously", praising both its dark content and humour, "a Richard Briers sitcom that's the opposite of The Good Life." The series was only broadcast once and never repeated; according to The Guardian, this was "possibly because it was too much of a leap for fans of The Good Life, but it has grown in cult status over the years."

=== The Vicar of Dibley ===
In terms of ratings, The Vicar of Dibley (1994–2007) starring Dawn French, is among the most successful British programmes of the digital era. The main character, Geraldine Granger, was invented by Richard Curtis, but he and French extensively consulted Joy Carroll, one of the first female Anglican priests. The series exploited the 1992 changes in the Church of England that permitted the ordination of women. The show included cameos from many actors and celebrities, many appearing as themselves, and including Sarah, Duchess of York, Hugh Bonneville, Mel Giedroyc, Richard Griffiths, Miranda Hart, Alistair McGowan, Geraldine McNulty, Philip Whitchurch, Nicholas Le Prevost, Brian Perkins and Roger Sloman, Pam Rhodes, Kylie Minogue, Rachel Hunter, Terry Wogan, Jeremy Paxman, Martyn Lewis, Darcey Bussell, Sean Bean, Richard Ayoade, Orla Brady, Fiona Bruce, Annette Crosbie, Johnny Depp, Ruth Jones, Hilary Kay, Damian Lewis, Maureen Lipman, Jennifer Saunders, Sting and his wife Trudie Styler, Stephen Tompkinson, Dervla Kirwan, and Emma Watson. Dibley received multiple British Comedy Awards, two International Emmys, and was a multiple British Academy Television Awards nominee. In 2004, it was placed third in a BBC poll to find Britain's Best Sitcom. In addition to the twenty main episodes between 1994 and 2007, the series included numerous shorter charity specials, as well as 'lockdown' episodes produced during the 2020-2021 COVID-19 pandemic. The theme music was a setting of Psalm 23 composed by Howard Goodall as a serious piece of church choral music, and performed by the choir of Christ Church Cathedral, Oxford, with George Humphreys singing the solo. The conductor was Stephen Darlington.

=== Hamish Macbeth ===
The 20 episode comedy drama series Hamish Macbeth (1995–1997), by Scottish screenwriter Daniel Boyle, was filmed mainly on location in the Scottish Highlands, in a departure from the convention that sitcoms are filmed in studio and accompanied by a laugh track. It was loosely adapted from the mystery novels by M. C. Beaton (Marion Chesney) by Daniel Boyle and starred Robert Carlyle as a police officer.

=== Father Ted ===
The highly successful Father Ted (1995–1998) series created by Irish writers Graham Linehan and Arthur Mathews, produced by British Hat Trick Productions for Channel 4 aired over three series, including a Christmas special, for 25 episodes. Set on the fictional Craggy Island, off Ireland's west coast, it starred Dermot Morgan as Father Ted Crilly, Ardal O'Hanlon as Father Dougal McGuire and Frank Kelly as Father Jack Hackett. Exiled to the island by Bishop Leonard Brennan, played by Jim Norton, the priests live together in the parochial house with their housekeeper Mrs Doyle, played by Pauline McLynn. The show subverts parodies of low-brow humour as it portrays nuanced themes of loneliness, agnosticism, existentialism and purgatory experienced by its title character; this deeper meaning of the show has been much acclaimed. The series won several BAFTA awards, twice winning for Best Comedy Series. In a 2001 poll by Channel 4, Father Dougal was ranked fifth on a list of the 100 Greatest TV Characters. In 2019, Father Ted was named the second-greatest British sitcom (after Fawlty Towers) by a panel of comedy experts for the Radio Times.

=== dinnerladies ===
A winner of many awards, including "Best New TV Comedy" at the 1999 British Comedy Awards, and "Best TV Comedy" in 2000. Created, written and co-produced by Victoria Wood, who also starred as the main character, Brenda Furlong, dinnerladies is based on the lives and interactions of the employees of a works canteen and ran for a total of 16 episodes during 1998 and 2000. The permanent cast occasionally featured guest actors, including Joanne Froggatt, Tina Malone, Dora Bryan OBE, Lynda Baron, Elspet Gray, Janette Tough, Simon Williams, Kenny Doughty and Eric Sykes CBE, and Dame Thora Hird DBE. Involving only one set throughout its run (with the exception of quiz show and hospital sets which are both seen on a television screen in the last two episodes), dinnerladies was entirely filmed at the London BBC Television Centre in front of a live studio audience employing a multiple-camera setup. The theme music was composed by Victoria Wood.

== 2000–2010 ==
At the turn of the Millennium, examples of the hyperreal approach pioneered by Galton and Simpson in some of their Hancock scripts was evident in Steve Coogan's 12-episode sitcom I'm Alan Partridge (1997–2002). Galton and Simpson's influence also found its way into The Office, a mockumentary, Early Doors, Gavin & Stacey and many British dramedies. The BBC began using their digital channels BBC Three and BBC Four to build a following for off-beat series including The Thick of It (2005–2012). Channel 4 had successes with Spaced (1999–2001), Black Books (2000–2004), Phoenix Nights (2001–2002), Peep Show (2003–2015), Green Wing (2004–2006), The IT Crowd (2006–2013) and The Inbetweeners (2008–2010). The late 2000s and early 2010s also saw a major resurgence in traditional-style sitcoms filmed in front of a studio audience and featuring a laughter track, such as Not Going Out (2006–), written by Lee Mack, Miranda (2009–2015), Reggie Perrin (2009–2010), a remake of the 1970s series The Fall and Rise of Reginald Perrin and Irish sitcom Mrs Brown's Boys (2011–). The most successful BBC sitcom of the time was My Family (2000–2011), which came 24th in the Britain's Best Sitcom poll in 2004 and was the most watched sitcom in the United Kingdom in 2008.

Other notable sitcoms in the new millennium included Outnumbered (2007–2016), Two Pints of Lager and a Packet of Crisps (2001–2011), about a group of young people living in Runcorn, and The IT Crowd (2006–2013), about IT colleagues.

=== The Royle Family ===
Caroline Aherne and Craig Cash wrote the 25 episodes of The Royle Family (1998–2012) for the BBC. It centred on the lives of a television-fixated working-class family, the Royles, a stereotype of family life at the turn of the century, sharing elements of kitchen sink drama. The Royle Family was placed 31st in the BFI's 2000 list of the 100 greatest British television programmes. In a 2001 Channel 4 poll, Jim Royle, the misanthropic head of the household, was ranked 11th on their list of the 100 Greatest TV Characters. In a 2004 BBC poll to find Britain's Best Sitcom, The Royle Family was placed 19th. The series also won several BAFTA awards.

=== The Office ===
The Office is a workplace mockumentary with 12 episodes plus a two-part Christmas special. Broadcast in two seasons from 2001 to 2003, it was created, written and directed by Ricky Gervais and Stephen Merchant. The series follows the day-to-day lives of office employees in the Slough branch of fictional Wernham Hogg paper company, centering on themes of social clumsiness, the trivialities of human behaviour, self-importance and conceit, frustration, desperation and fame. Gervais also starred in the series as the central character, David Brent. After a slow start it has since become one of the most successful of all British comedy exports. It has been sold to broadcasters in over 80 countries, including ABC1 in Australia, The Comedy Network in Canada, TVNZ in New Zealand, and the pan-Asian satellite channel Star World, based in Hong Kong. It was shown in the United States on BBC America from 2001 to 2016, and later on Cartoon Network's late night programming block Adult Swim from 2009 to 2011. In a 2021 BBC poll The Office came 9th out of 100 of the best shows of the 21st century.

=== Doc Martin ===
Like Hamish Macbeth in the 1990s, Doc Martin (2004–2022), is a dramedy series of 79 episodes through its 10 years. It stars Martin Clunes as Dr. Martin Ellingham, the general practitioner of a Cornish village, and Caroline Catz supported by a regular cast and many guests including Stephanie Cole (Waiting for God, Open All Hours), and Eileen Atkins. Created by Dominic Minghella and written and produced by Philippa Braithwaite, it was filmed on location in the village of Port Isaac, with most interior scenes shot in a converted local barn. In 2004, Doc Martin won the British Comedy Award for "Best TV Comedy Drama", having also been nominated as "Best New TV Comedy". The tenth (and final) series aired from 7 September 2022 to 26 October 2022; one last installment, a Christmas special that aired on 25 December 2022, was the programme's final episode.

=== The Green Green Grass ===
Running for 32 episodes over four series and three Christmas specials The Green Green Grass (2005 and 2009) was a spin-off from Only Fools and Horses, produced for the BBC and created and initially written by John Sullivan, who also wrote the theme music. It starred John Challis, Sue Holderness and Jack Doolan from Only Fools and Horses. It also featured several guest stars including Paula Wilcox (Man About the House), American actor George Wendt and Dame June Whitfield (Happy Ever After, Absolutely Fabulous, Last of the Summer Wine).

=== Gavin & Stacey ===
James Corden and Ruth Jones wrote the 20 episodes of Gavin & Stacey produced by Baby Cow Productions (2007–2010) for BBC Cymru Wales over three series which were directed by Christine Gernonmover. It centres on two families, one in Billericay, Essex, and the other in Barry, South Wales. Mathew Horne and Joanna Page played Gavin and Stacey, and the writers played their best friends, Smithy and Nessa. Alison Steadman and Larry Lamb played Gavin's parents, Pam and Mick, Melanie Walters played Stacey's mother, Gwen, and Rob Brydon played her uncle, Bryn. Broadcast on Christmas Day 2009 and New Year's Day 2010, Christmas Day 2019, and Christmas Day 2024, episodes of the final series formed a significant part of the prime-time BBC seasonal programming. Acclaimed as both a hit and a breakthrough show for the BBC, it was the most nominated show in the 2007 British Comedy Awards. It won several awards, including the BAFTAs Audience Award, and the British Comedy Awards Best TV Comedy Award, both in 2008. In 2019, Gavin & Stacey was named the 17th-greatest British sitcom in a poll by Radio Times. 18.49 million people watched the Christmas Day 2019 special, the most-viewed non-sporting event in a decade and the most-watched comedy episode for 17 years, and the 2024 finale with 12.3 million TV viewers was the most watched show on Christmas Day since 2008. After one week's consolidated viewing the finale episode had become the UK's most-watched scripted show since modern records began with 19.3 million viewers.

=== Benidorm ===
Written and created by Derren Litten and produced by Tiger Aspect for ITV, Benidorm (2007–2018) aired for 74 episodes over ten series. The series featured an ensemble cast of holidaymakers and staff at the Solana all-inclusive hotel in Benidorm, Spain over the course of a week each year. The series had a large ensemble cast, which changed throughout its ten seasons and included Abigail Cruttenden, Adam Gillen, Alan David, Asa Elliott, Bel Powley, Bobby Knutt, Charlotte Eaton, Crissy Rock, Danny Walters, Elsie Kelly, Geoffrey Hutchings, Hannah Hobley, Hannah Waddingham, Honor Kneafsey, Hugh Sachs, Jake Canuso, Janine Duvitski, John Challis, Johnny Vegas, Josh Bolt, Julie Graham, Kate Fitzgerald, Kathryn Drysdale, Kenny Ireland, Michelle Butterly, Nathan Bryon, Nicholas Burns, Oliver Stokes, Paul Bazely, Perry Benson, Selina Griffiths, Sheila Reid, Shelley Longworth, Sheridan Smith, Sherrie Hewson, Simon Greenall, Siobhan Finneran, Steve Edge, Steve Pemberton, Tim Healy, Tony Maudsley and many guest stars. The first series proved to be a hit for ITV, with critics describing it as "beautifully written and performed" and "a gem of wry observation in withering bad taste".

== Since 2010 ==
The censoring of repeats, especially where the watershed, the time after which adult programming is allowed to be broadcast, is being eroded by on demand viewing and OTT technology. The standard solution is to provide a warning to viewers of real-time transmissions that the programme contains language which some viewers may find offensive. 'Characters who are complicated, multi-dimensional and not always easy to like are now the norm and not the exception' Other recent British sitcoms include Brassic (2019–present), Chewing Gum (2015–2017), Friday Night Dinner (2011–2020), Bad Education (2012–2014, 2022-2024), Cuckoo (2012–2019), Fleabag (2016–2019) which 'challenged audience expectations of characters', and Peter Kay's Car Share (2015–2018).

=== Still Open All Hours ===
The sequel to Open All Hours, Still Open All Hours (2013–2019), was created and written by Roy Clarke for the BBC. Starring David Jason (Open All Hours, Only Fools and Horses), its 41 episodes retain the 20th century sitcom traditions of its predecessor. The show is supported by James Baxter and a regular supporting cast of Lynda Baron, Stephanie Cole, Maggie Ollerenshaw, Brigit Forsyth, Johnny Vegas, Kulvinder Ghir, Geoffrey Whitehead, Sally Lindsay, Tim Healy, Sue Holderness, Dean Smith, Archie Panjabi and Nina Wadia, with Baron, Cole, and Ollerenshaw reprising their original characters from Open All Hours. Directed by Dewi Humphreys, and produced by Jason, Alex Walsh-Taylor Sarah Hitchcock, and Gareth Edwards, the series continued the theme of Open All Hours while focusing on the life of a much older Granville - still played by Jason - running his late uncle Arkwright's traditional English corner shop with his son's help.

=== Breeders ===
The British-American parental black comedy television series Breeders ran from 2020 to 2023 for 40 episodes over 4 seasons. The show was created by Martin Freeman, Chris Addison and Simon Blackwell. The series follows two parents who struggle with parenthood and is partially based on Freeman's own experiences. Freeman also plays the lead role. The series premiered on 2 March 2020, on the American cable network FX, and on the British network Sky One on 12 March 2020. In July 2022, the series was renewed for a fourth and final season, which premiered on July 31, 2023.

== Writers, directors and producers ==
=== Barry Took ===
Barry Took came to TV comedy following his hugely successful half-hour radio sketch comedies such as Beyond Our Ken (1958 - 1964) and its successor Round the Horne 1965 - 1968 and paved the way for the format of many television sitcoms. Took, with writing partner Marty Feldman with whom he collaborated for over ten years in radio and television, created the early sitcoms The Army Game in 1958 starring Alfie Bass (Till Death Us Do Part and Are You Being Served?) and Bill Fraser ( Hancock's Half Hour) and later wrote its sequel Bootsie and Snudge (1960) of which 100 episodes were made, pioneering TV comedy with one of its most enduring features, 'the ill-sorted pair'. The team's first BBC series was The Walrus and the Carpenter (1965), starring Warren Mitchell and Ronnie Barker. He became Head of Light Entertainment for London Weekend Television and he launched several shows, including the successful On the Buses, and was instrumental in launching the team that became Monty Python's Flying Circus.

=== Roy Clarke ===
Royston Clarke (born 28 January 1930), usually known as Roy Clarke, began his career In the late 1960s writing thrillers for BBC Radio. Clarke is a prolific television drama creator who wrote sixteen of Britain's best known sitcoms. In 2002, he received an OBE for his contribution to British comedy. He was awarded the lifetime achievement award at the 2010 British Comedy Awards. He is also the 1996 winner of the BAFTA Dennis Potter Award, the 2010 British Comedy Awards winner, and the 1971 Writers' Guild of Great Britain Best Writer award. Clarke was the sole writer of Last of the Summer Wine, which at its peak had an audience of over 18 million viewers and is the longest-running comedy programme in Britain and the longest-running sitcom in the world. Among his well known works are Keeping Up Appearances, Open All Hours and its sequel series, Still Open All Hours.

=== David Croft ===
David Croft (1922–2011) was a screenwriter, producer and director. He produced and wrote a string of BBC sitcoms with partners Jimmy Perry and Jeremy Lloyd, including Dad's Army, It Ain't Half Hot Mum and Hi-de-Hi!. Like Perry, he served in tropical Asia during the Second World War. While Dad's Army was still running, Croft began to co-write Are You Being Served? with Jeremy Lloyd. He continued both writing partnerships for the rest of his career in other series including You Rang, M'Lord with Perry and 'Allo 'Allo! with Lloyd. His last full series, Oh, Doctor Beeching! (1995–1997), was co-written with Richard Spendlove. He created a television pilot in 2007, entitled Here Comes The Queen, with Jeremy Lloyd, but the show was not continued as a series. Together with Perry, Croft was presented with a British Comedy Award in 2003 for lifetime achievement, and in 1978 OBE for services to television. He also received the 1981 Desmond Davies Award from the British Academy of Film and Television Arts, for his contributions to the industry.

=== Jimmy Perry ===
Jimmy Perry (1923–2016) created Dad's Army with David Croft. The song he wrote for the series, Who Do You Think You Are Kidding, Mr Hitler?, won him an Ivor Novello Award. Croft and Perry wrote together for over 30 years. Along with Frank Muir and Denis Norden, and Galton and Simpson, they were among the dominant writing teams of the period. Perry could send himself up as well as others. His autobiography was to be called A Boy's Own Story, but it came out in 2002 under the title A Stupid Boy. In Dad's Army, he drew on his experience as a young member of the Home Guard, on his service in India and Burma during the war for It Ain't Half Hot Mum, and his time as a Butlin's holiday camp Redcoat for Hi-de-Hi, for which he wrote the song "Holiday Rock". When he said he wanted to be a film star or a comedian, his father responded: "You stupid boy!" Perry used the phrase in Dad's Army and it became a catch phrase. Perry effectively retired after You Rang, M'Lord? finished. He was awarded an OBE in 1978. He won Lifetime Achievement Awards from the Writer's Guild (1995) and at the British Comedy Awards (2003).

=== Galton and Simpson ===
Ray Galton and Alan Simpson (1930–2018 and 1929–2017) wrote together for over 50 years The standard of their scripts became a touchstone for sitcom style, helping to steer Britain down a different path from the American team writing system in. Their most famous series were Hancock's Half Hour and Steptoe and Son. Some of their scripts for Hancock almost repudiated a narrative structure altogether and attempted to reproduce an everyday environment with the intention of also reproducing its comedy. Both the character played by Tony Hancock in Hancock's Half Hour, and Harold Steptoe, played by Harry H. Corbett, were pretentious would-be intellectuals who found themselves trapped by the squalor of their lives. The Galton and Simpson comedies were often characterised by a bleak and somewhat fatalistic tone. Steptoe and Son in particular was at times an example of black comedy, and close in tone to Social realism drama.

=== Chesney and Wolfe ===
Chesney and Wolfe was a prolific comedy scriptwriting team of Ronald Chesney and Ronald Wolfe whose partnership contributed significantly to the genre of British sitcoms. Spanning the years from the mid-1950s to 1989, among their best shows are The Rag Trade starring Dame Barbara Windsor (Carry On films) with Dame Penelope Keith (The Good Life and To the Manor Born), who also starred again together in Wild, Wild Women with an all-star cast and Anna Karen who later starred in Chesney and Wolfe's On the Buses. These were workplace shows with sexist and humorously indecent comedy that obtained very high viewer ratings but were not well received by TV critics. Their other credits include Meet the Wife, an episode of 'Allo 'Allo! (1989), and Watch This Space in 1980 which was less of a success. Their shows featured many of the regular actors from award-winning comedy shows and films and including among many others, DameThora Hird - a household name and a British institution, Ian Lavender (Dad's Army), Reg Varney (On the Buses), Sheila Hancock (Mr Digby Darling), Prunella Scales (Fawlty Towers), Peter Jones (actor), Their 1971 spin-off film, On the Buses, the first of the three based on the TV series, was the highest British box-office earner of that year.

=== Jeremy Lloyd ===
Jeremy Lloyd (1930–2014) co-wrote Are You Being Served? and 'Allo 'Allo!; his sitcoms have been called "the essence of Britishness". Are You Being Served? was based partly on his own experiences of working in a London department store as a suit salesman. Its success gave rise a spin-off, Grace and Favour, which was a collaboration with David Croft. During 1970 Lloyd was briefly married to actress, presenter and producer Joanna Lumley (Absolutely Fabulous) with whom he starred in the sitcom It's Awfully Bad for Your Eyes, Darling. Lloyd was appointed an OBE in 2013.

=== John Howard Davies ===
John Howard Davies (1939–2011) joined the BBC as a production assistant in 1966, and became a television director and producer specializing in comedy. In 1978 he became the head of comedy, and in 1982 the head of light entertainment. For four decades, he was a major influence as commissioning producer on shows such as Fawlty Towers by John Cleese and Connie Booth, Galton and Simpson's Steptoe and Son, All Gas and Gaiters, The Goodies, and The Fall and Rise of Reginald Perrin. Davies was also the producer of all four seasons of The Good Life. When asked what the best formula for a sitcom is, he replied "All the best sitcom characters are relentlessly horrible."

=== Cooke and Mortimer ===
Brian Cooke and Johnnie Mortimer were a comedy writing duo whose career began in radio with the critically acclaimed Round the Horne of 1968, and its sequel Stop Messing About created as a vehicle for Kenneth Williams of Carry On fame. Together they penned many of the 1970s popular TV sitcoms often featuring well known comedy actors such as Paul Eddington of The Good Life and Yes Minister, Patrick Cargill (Father, Dear Father); Richard O'Sullivan, Yootha Joyce, and Brian Murphy of Man About the House ; Peter Butterworth (Carry On), Peter Jones, Beryl Reid, Roy Kinnear, Joan Sanderson. Independently, Cooke created Tripper's Day featuring Leonard Rossiter of The Fall and Rise of Reginald Perrin and Eric Chappell's highly successful Rising Damp. On his own, Mortimer wrote Never the Twain starring Donald Sinden (Two's Company) and Windsor Davies (It Ain't Half Hot Mum).

== Composers ==
=== Burt Rhodes (1923–2003) ===
Rhodes wrote the title music for The Good Life. He was a successful light entertainment composer and musical director including his arrangements for comedienne Beryl Reid's 1968-67 Beryl Reid Says Good Evening. He collaborated with many stars including Judy Garland, Pearl Bailey, Sammy Davis Jr., Vic Damone and Bruce Forsyth. Rhodes was often referred to as "the musicians' musician", counting musicians such as Ronnie Hazlehurst, Monty Norman and Phil Phillips among his friends. In 1958 he scored the theme for Dr No, the first James Bond film.

=== Ronnie Hazlehurst (1928–2007) ===
A prolific composer for sitcoms, comedy productions, game shows and other programmes, Hazlehurst joined the BBC in 1961, and became a staff arranger; his early works included the incidental music for The Likely Lads and The Liver Birds. In 1968 he became the Light Entertainment Musical Director and composed the theme tunes of many sitcoms, including Are You Being Served?, Some Mothers Do 'Ave 'Em, Last of the Summer Wine (where he also wrote all the instrumental music for the show), I Didn't Know You Cared, The Fall and Rise of Reginald Perrin, To the Manor Born, Yes Minister and Yes, Prime Minister, Just Good Friends and Three Up, Two Down. He also arranged the themes for Butterflies, Sorry! and the first series of Only Fools and Horses. His theme tunes often included elements designed to fit the programmes, such as a cash till in Are You Being Served?, rises and falls in The Fall and Rise of Reginald Perrin and the Big Ben chimes for Yes Minister. For Some Mothers Do 'Ave 'Em, Hazlehurst used Morse code to spell out the programme's title. During his career he composed the music for the opening of the BBC's coverage of the 1976 Olympics. Jon Plowman, Head of BBC Comedy, said, "He was the composer of many of the best-loved signature tunes of the last 40 years of television - and some of his work is still heard today. He's associated with some of the best-loved shows of our lives."

=== Tony Russell (1929–1970) ===
Russell wrote the music for On the Buses and the children's programme The Herbs. He studied composition with Richard Rodney Bennett and Bill Russo. He was in Russo's London Jazz Orchestra and took over running this when Russo returned to the United States in 1965. He later became a busy composer and wrote the score of the musical The Matchgirls.

=== Nick Ingman (born 1948) ===
The title music for Keeping Up Appearances was written by Nick Ingman, a visiting professor at the London College of Music. His collaborators include Paul McCartney, Mick Jagger, Björk, and The X Factor. His arrangements have accounted for fourteen No. 1 singles and five double platinum albums in the UK and he has been nominated for a Grammy three times.

=== Simon Brint (1950–2011) ===
Brint was closely associated with the Alternative Comedy movement and contributed music to several associated projects including the sitcoms Absolutely Fabulous and 2point4 Children.

=== Anne Dudley (born 1956) ===
Dudley composed the jazz-swing title and incidental music for all episodes of Jeeves and Wooster. She is a composer, keyboardist, conductor and pop musician, winning many awards including an Oscar for Best Original Musical or Comedy Score for the comedy film The Full Monty. Dudley was the first BBC Concert Orchestra's Composer in Association in 2001, and has composed the scores for over twenty other films.

=== Peter Brewis ===
Brewis has music credits for several comedy programmes including the sitcoms The Young Ones and Filthy, Rich and Catflap.

=== Howard Goodall (born 1958) ===
The title themes for The Vicar of Dibley, Blackadder, Red Dwarf and Mr. Bean are among Howard Goodall's most memorable melodies. He also presents music-based programmes on television and radio, for which he has won many awards. In 2008, he was named as a presenter and Composer-in-Residence at the British radio station Classic FM. In 2009, he was named "Composer of the Year" at the Classic Brit Awards.

=== Jonathan Whitehead (1960–2020) ===
A composer for many sitcoms and other comedies, Whitehead's sitcom credits include Black Books, Green Wing, Campus, Nathan Barley and Rev. His music for Green Wing was nominated for a BAFTA and won the RTS Award for Best Original Music. He occasionally wrote under the name "Trellis".

== Film spin-offs ==
By 2020, at least 45 British sitcoms had been adapted into over 50 feature films; the first of the three On the Buses films was the biggest hit at the British box office in 1971. However, they were not always critical successes. In a review of Are You Being Served?, Michael Stailey of DVD Verdict regarded the 1977 film as "guilty of violating almost every law of comedy and film." John Pym of The Monthly Film Bulletin also gave the film a negative review, stating that "The humour consists mainly of a withering selection of patent British puns; an inflatable brassiere, some let's-insult-the-Germans jokes and a rickety thunder-box which bolts from the outside are thrown in for good measure." The film holds a 58% positive rating on Rotten Tomatoes; the cutoff for a positive rating is 59%. Moreover, as with the series they were based on, some films have been criticised for not meeting contemporary levels of political correctness.

Other sitcom adaptions from the era included Bottoms Up (1960), based on Whack-O!, Till Death Us Do Part (1968) and its sequel The Alf Garnett Saga (1972), Dad's Army (1971), On the Buses (1971) and its sequels, Please Sir! (1971), Bless This House (1972), Steptoe and Son (1972) and its sequel, Nearest and Dearest (1972), Father, Dear Father (1973), Love Thy Neighbour (1973), Man About the House (1974), The Likely Lads (1976), Porridge (1979), and George and Mildred (1980).

== Criticism and social issues ==
British sitcoms reflect changes in public opinion and culture through the times. They began at a time in which, for example, "class and ethnic prejudices were challenged and mocked". They heavily featured slapstick humour and offensive slurs. Series such as Love Thy Neighbour (1972–76), and Mind Your Language (1977–79, 1986), which attempted to find humour in racial or ethnic conflict and misunderstandings, have been increasingly criticised over time. Johnny Speight, the creator of In Sickness and In Health, defended its depiction of the central character Alf Garnett, saying: "If you do the character correctly, he just typifies what you hear - not only in pubs but in golf clubs around the country. To make him truthful he's got to say those things, and they are nasty things. But I feel as a writer that they should be out in the open so we can see how daft these comparisons are."

The contemporary It Ain't Half Hot Mum has also been criticised for racism, homophobia, and whitewashing its cast. The writer, Jimmy Perry, defended it saying those elements were true to life. Meanwhile, Whack-O!, a 1960s series set in a private school, has been described as "a little painful" to watch today for its depictions of caning. Even Fawlty Towers, considered one of the best sitcoms of all time, has been criticised for its cruelty.

== Research ==
In 2005, a group of scientists led by Dr. Helen Pilcher was commissioned by the satellite channel UKTV Gold to study 20 years of British sitcoms. Using the medical drama Casualty as a control, the team came up with a formula for measuring the success or failure of sitcoms. This formula assessed the recognisability of the main character and their delusions of grandeur, the wittiness of the script, the physical injuries the cast suffer and their differences in social statues, and the success of any plans. There was a maximum score of 1120, and Casualty scored 5.5. The top shows and their scores were Only Fools and Horses (which scored 696), The Office (678), Father Ted (564), Fawlty Towers (557), and Blackadder (374.5).

The very worst sitcoms of the 20 year period were:

- Eyes Down (2003–2004), starring Paul O'Grady and Sheridan Smith, which scored 96.
- According to Bex (2005), with Jessica Stevenson, and written by Katie Douglas, Julia Barron and Fred Barron. Critical reception to this show was negative, with The Stage calling it "the biggest sitcom disaster of the year" and the British Comedy Guide describing it as "dull and predictable". Despite reports that a second series had been planned, the show was cancelled after the first series due to low ratings. Stevenson considered the series so bad that she quit her agent. It scored 67.
- Sam's Game (2001), starring TV presenter Davina McCall and comedian Ed Byrne. Written by Byrne and uncredited contributors, it ran for only six episodes. It scored 22.
- Babes in the Wood (1998–1999), a flat-share comedy created and written by Geoff Deane. The Times called it "very shoddy". The Rough Guide to British Cult Comedy called it "hackneyed". The Daily Mirror was highly critical of Claire King's guest appearance. In an overview of ITV programmes, columnist Stuart Heritage of The Guardian named Babes in the Wood as one of the worst shows in the network's history. He described Babes in the Wood as "a show where some babes live in St John's Wood and literally nothing else happens". It scored 8.
- 'Orrible (2001), written by and starring Johnny Vaughan, and lasting only for 8 episodes, came last with a score of 6.5.

== British sitcoms overseas ==
=== United States ===
British sitcoms are often seen on the Public Broadcasting Service (PBS), usually thanks to the effort of WGBH, and increasingly on cable television, including BBC America and Comedy Central. Are You Being Served?, Keeping Up Appearances and As Time Goes By became sleeper hits when they aired on PBS, while Absolutely Fabulous enjoyed a significant following when it aired on Comedy Central and The Office won a Golden Globe award in 2004 for "Best Television Series—Musical or Comedy", surpassing American series such as Sex and the City and Will & Grace.

Several British sitcoms have been successfully remade for the American market. Notable examples include Steptoe and Son which became Sanford and Son, Till Death Us Do Part, which became All in the Family, and The Office which was remade into an American series of the same name. Three's Company, a remake of Man About the House, had its own spinoffs: The Ropers, based on George and Mildred, and Three's a Crowd, based on Robin's Nest. Other American remakes of British sitcoms include What a Country!, based on Mind Your Language. More recently, shows such as The Inbetweeners was adapted into an American version, as was The Thick of It as Veep. A large number of US adaptations end up being cancelled early or are not commissioned after their pilots are created. Another notable difference, which can be both positive or negative depending upon the skill of the cast and writers, is the American media culture of 20 or more episodes in a season, as opposed to the British tendency to have fewer than 10 episodes per series.

=== Australia and New Zealand ===
In Australia, many British comedy series are aired on the ABC, which is the Australian equivalent of the BBC. British shows are also sometimes shown on the three commercial television networks in Australia, especially Seven Network during the 1970s. In New Zealand, state-run TVNZ also broadcasts many British series. The majority of British comedies now air in both countries on the subscription channels The Comedy Channel and UKTV.

Australian commercial television channels made their own versions of British comedies during the 1970s, often using members of the original casts. These included: Are You Being Served?, Father, Dear Father, Doctor Down Under, Love Thy Neighbour in Australia. In both countries, locally produced sitcoms have historically been heavily influenced by the structure of British sitcoms, such as in the New Zealand sitcom Gliding On.

=== India ===
In the 1980s, India's national broadcaster Doordarshan showed Fawlty Towers, Yes Minister and Mind Your Language.

== See also ==
- Black comedy
- British humour
- List of BBC sitcoms
- List of American television series based on British television series
- Sitcom
- Lists of films based on British TV comedies
