= Foreign Affairs (1964 TV series) =

1964 British TV sitcom

- Genre: Sitcom
- Starring: Alfie Bass; Bill Fraser; Nicholas Phipps; Arthur Barrett
- Country of origin: United Kingdom
- No. of series: 1
- No. of episodes: 8

Production
- Producers: Peter Eton; Derek Granger
- Running time: 30 minutes
- Production company: Granada Television

Original release
- Network: ITV
- Release: 2 January – 20 February 1964

Related
- Bootsie and Snudge; The Army Game

Foreign Affairs is a British sitcom that aired on ITV in 1964. It is a spin-off of Bootsie and Snudge, itself a spin-off of The Army Game and starred Alfie Bass and Bill Fraser as the main characters. The entire series was wiped and is no longer thought to exist.

== Background ==
Seven months after the end of the third series of Bootsie and Snudge, where the title characters worked in a gentleman's club in central London, Alfie Bass and Bill Fraser reprised the roles they first played in The Army Game. Bootsie and Snudge went on to be revived for a fourth series in 1974. Foreign Affairs was written by Barry Took, Peter Jones (who was also the script editor), Richard Harris and Dennis Spooner.

== Cast ==
- Alfie Bass – Montague 'Bootsie' Bisley
- Bill Fraser – Claude Snudge
- Nicholas Phipps – Ambassador
- Arthur Barrett – Third Secretary

== Plot ==
Bootsie and Snudge are now employed by the diplomatic service and work at the British Embassy in the fictional Bosnik, somewhere in Europe. Snudge believes he is ambassador material whilst Bootsie is the security officer.

== Episodes ==
Foreign Affairs aired on Thursdays at 7.30pm. Due to the archival policies of the time, all eight episodes were subsequently wiped and no longer exist.

#	Episode Title	Original Broadcast Date
1	Episode One	2 January 1964
2	Episode Two	9 January 1964
3	Episode Three	16 January 1964
4	Episode Four	23 January 1964
5	Episode Five	30 January 1964
6	Episode Six	6 February 1964
7	Episode Seven	13 February 1964
8	Episode Eight	20 February 1964
