= Robert Desmond =

British actor (1922–2002)

- Born: 16 December 1922; London, England
- Died: 2002 (aged 79–80); London, England

Robert Desmond (16 December 1922 – 2002) was a British film and television actor of the 1950s and 1960s.

He started out in juvenile roles, making his film debut in 1948's The Guinea Pig opposite Richard Attenborough. He appeared in a number of early television films such Boys in Brown, recreating the role of Spud Parker in the theatrical film version of 1949, again with Attenborough. He would appear opposite Attenborough one more time in The Great Escape (1963), as Griffith the Tailor. Other films include The Cockleshell Heroes (1955), Indiscreet (1958), The Ugly Duckling (1959), Sink the Bismarck! (1960), The Bulldog Breed (1960) and The Best of Enemies (1961).

On television he appeared in the UK's first daily soap opera Sixpenny Corner as Stan Norton and later starred in the popular sixties soap Compact as Adrian Coombs. In 1967 he played Tod Miller in another soap opera Crossroads. In 1960 he starred as Private Billy "Noddy" Baker in the third series of popular sitcom The Army Game.

Other television appearances include The Adventures of Robin Hood, Dial 999, ITV Play of the Week and The Avengers.

== Filmography ==
Year	Title	Role	Notes
1948	The Guinea Pig		Uncredited
1949	Don't Ever Leave Me	Mechanic	Uncredited
1949	Boys in Brown	Spud Parker	
1955	The Cockleshell Heroes	Marine Todd	
1957	These Dangerous Years	Cream O'Casey	
1958	Indiscreet	Young Man	Uncredited
1959	The Lady Is a Square		Uncredited
1959	The Ugly Duckling	Dizzy	
1960	Sink the Bismarck!	Dexter	Uncredited
1960	Too Young to Love	1st Sailor	Uncredited
1960	The Bulldog Breed	Sailor on Bridge of Warship	Uncredited
1961	Nearly a Nasty Accident	2nd Service Policeman	Uncredited
1961	The Best of Enemies	Pvt. Singer	
1962	Gaolbreak	Page	
1963	The Great Escape	Griffith 'Tailor'	
1967	Calamity the Cow	Auctioneer	Uncredited
