= Alfie Bass =

English actor (1916–1987)

- Born: Abraham Basalinsky; 10 April 1916; Bethnal Green, London, England
- Died: 16 July 1987 (aged 71); Barnet, London, England
- Years active: 1943–1982
- Spouse: Beryl Bryson (m. 1946)
- Children: 2

Alfie Bass (born Abraham Basalinsky, 10 April 1916 – 16 July 1987) was an English actor. He was born in Bethnal Green, London, the youngest in a Jewish family with ten children; his parents had left Russia many years before he was born. He appeared in a variety of stage, film, television and radio productions throughout his career.

== Personal life ==
Alfie Bass was born Abraham Basalinsky in Bethnal Green in London's East End. He was the youngest of ten children of Jacob Basalinsky, who had fled Jewish persecution in Russia, and his wife, Ada Miller. After leaving school, he worked in his father's trade as a cabinet-maker. During this time, he took part in amateur dramatics at a local boys' club. He was active in the labour movement and often attended union meetings. In 1936, he took part in the Battle of Cable Street, in which activists attempted to prevent a march through the East End by the British Union of Fascists.

At the outbreak of World War II, he was rejected by the RAF, and went to work in an engineering factory. He was later called up into the Middlesex Regiment as a despatch rider. He maintained his interest in acting by appearing in concert parties and in Army Film Unit documentaries.

In 1946, he married Beryl Bryson, a dressmaker, in Liverpool. They had a son and a daughter.

== Stage career ==
Bass's acting career began at London's Unity Theatre in the late 1930s, appearing in Plant in the Sun alongside Paul Robeson, and as the pantomime King in Babes In the Wood.

His stage career included plays by Shakespeare and Shaw. During the 1950s, he continued to direct shows at Unity, and on one occasion appeared in court (along with Vida Hope), charged with putting on a play without a licence. His stage work also included an adaptation of Gogol's short story The Bespoke Overcoat, transposed to the East End of London, which was filmed by Jack Clayton in 1956, and won the Oscar for Best Short. In addition, Bass took over from Chaim Topol in the role of Tevye in Fiddler on the Roof on the West End stage.

== Film career ==
Bass first appeared on film in wartime documentaries. He also appeared in a number of feature films including The Lavender Hill Mob (1951), Hell Drivers (1957), A Tale of Two Cities (1958) and Alfie (1966) starring Michael Caine and Shelley Winters. In the latter he played Harry Clamacraft, a man Alfie meets and befriends in a sanatorium.

He starred in Roman Polanski's vampire film The Fearless Vampire Killers (1967) (British title The Dance of the Vampires) as innkeeper Yoine Shagal with his daughter Sarah played by Sharon Tate. In the course of the film, he and his daughter become vampires. When a maid tries to scare him off with a crucifix, he responds with "Oy, have you got the wrong vampire!".

Bass also appeared in the "Pride" segment of The Magnificent Seven Deadly Sins (1971) and had a leading role in the 1977 sex comedy Come Play with Me. He has had many cameo roles, such as the Indian restaurant doorman in the Beatles' film Help! (1965), as Clouseau's seafaring informant in Revenge of the Pink Panther (1978), and in Moonraker (1979), in which he was cast as a heavy smoking hard drinker. Bass had a small part in I Was Monty's Double as a non-speaking passenger on a train.

In his book British Film Character Actors (1982), Terence Pettigrew remembers, "there was a time when no British film seemed complete without Alfie Bass popping up in some guise or other. Basically playing the same character, he has hopped chirpily from drama to comedy and into costume pieces and back like an energised sparrow. To all of these, he has added an engaging warmth and sanguinity".

== Television and radio ==
Bass appeared as a poacher rescued by Robin Hood in the first episode of The Adventures of Robin Hood starring Richard Greene, in episode 2 "The Moneylender", as well as in episode 10 of the first series which was titled "The Ordeal". He also appeared in two later episodes during season two titled "The Goldmaker" (episode 5) and "The Goldmaker's Return" (episode 22) as Lepidus, the roguish alchemist, rescued from the Sheriff by Little John (Archie Duncan). He appeared in The Army Game (1957–1961), a British TV comedy series, as Private Montague 'Excused Boots' Bisley, and its sequel Bootsie and Snudge from 1960 to 1963 (there was also a one series revival in colour in 1974), working at a Gentlemen's club with Bill Fraser as 'Claude Snudge' and Clive Dunn as 'Henry Beerbohm Johnson'. Bass additionally played the character in another spin-off, Foreign Affairs, in 1964. Bass also played Lemuel "Lemmy" Barnet in the third and fourth series of the landmark 1950s science fiction BBC Radio series Journey into Space.

He was a subject of the television programme This Is Your Life in March 1970, when he was surprised by Eamonn Andrews.

He continued working throughout the 1970s and 80s, particularly in the TV series' Till Death Us Do Part and Are You Being Served?, the latter as Mr. Goldberg, the second in a series of replacements for Arthur Brough's Mr. Grainger character (the first being James Hayter's Mr. Tebbs). As in the Mr. Goldberg role, he often emphasised his Jewish background in his on-screen characterisations. He left the show after one series.

Bass appeared in a 1979 episode of the ITV drama series Danger UXB: Just Like a Woman, as a family man with an unexploded bomb in his back garden.

Bass played a memorable Silas Wegg in the BBC's 1976 adaptation of Dickens's Our Mutual Friend. He also played Isaac Rag in a notable recurring character role in the 1979–1980 Dick Turpin series, and Morrie Levin, a shrewd accountant, in the Minder episode The Son Also Rises (1982).

He also guest starred in two episodes of the British comedy television The Goodies, in which he appeared as the "Town Planner" in Camelot, and as the "Giant" in The Goodies and the Beanstalk.

== Recording career ==
In 1955, Bass recorded the novelty song "Pity the Downtrodden Landlord". It was issued by the folk music label Topic Records on a 78rpm single, backed with "Housing Repairs And Rents Act", written by Fred Dallas; on both sides, Bass was accompanied by "The Four Bailiffs".

With his fellow cast members from The Army Game, Bernard Bresslaw and Michael Medwin, and guesting opera singer Leslie Fyson, Bass was part of a vocal quartet who scored a number 5 hit in the UK Singles Chart in 1958 with "The Signature Tune Of The Army Game". It was backed with the same actors singing "What Do We Do In The Army". In 1960, Pye Records issued two solo recordings by Bass on a single, "Villikens And His Dinah" and "Rat Catcher's Daughter".

== Death ==
Bass died on 16 July 1987 in Barnet General Hospital, north London, following a heart attack. He was survived by his wife and their son and daughter. His last home was in Well End, a suburb of Borehamwood, Hertfordshire.

== Selected filmography ==
- The Bells Go Down (1943) – (uncredited)
- Johnny Frenchman (1945) – Corporal
- Brief Encounter (1945) – Waiter at the Royal (uncredited)
- Holiday Camp (1947) – Redcoat
- Jassy (1947) – Witness (uncredited)
- It Always Rains on Sunday (1947) – Dicey
- Vice Versa (1948) – 1st Urchin
- The Monkey's Paw (1948) – Speedway Track Manager
- Man on the Run (1949) – Bert the Barge Mate
- The Hasty Heart (1949) – Orderly
- Boys in Brown (1949) – 'Basher' Walker
- Stage Fright (1950) – Stage Hand With Microphone (uncredited)
- Pool of London (1951) – Alf, a henchman
- Talk of a Million (1951) – Lorcan
- The Galloping Major (1951) – Charlie – the newsboy
- The Lavender Hill Mob (1951) – Shorty
- High Treason (1951) – Albert Brewer (uncredited)
- Brandy for the Parson (1952) – Dallyn
- Treasure Hunt (1952) – Tipster (uncredited)
- Derby Day (1952) – Spider Wilkes
- The Planter's Wife (1952) – Soldier (uncredited)
- Made in Heaven (1952) – Bert Jenkins
- Top of the Form (1953) – Artie Jones
- The Square Ring (1953) – Frank Forbes
- Murder by Proxy (1954) – Ernie
- Time Is My Enemy (1954) – Ernie Gordon
- The Angel Who Pawned Her Harp (1954) – Lennox
- The Passing Stranger (1954) – Harry
- To Dorothy a Son (1954) – Cab Driver
- Svengali (1954) – Carrell
- The Night My Number Came Up (1955) – The Soldier
- The Ship That Died of Shame (1955) – Sailor on 1087 (uncredited)
- A Kid for Two Farthings (1955) – Alf the Bird Man (uncredited)
- Make Me an Offer (1955) – Fred Frames
- King's Rhapsody (1955) – Man in Crowd (uncredited)
- Jumping for Joy (1956) – Blagg
- Behind the Headlines (1956) – Sammy
- Child in the House (1956) – Ticket Collector
- Sailor Beware! (1956) – Organist (uncredited)
- A Touch of the Sun (1956) – May
- The Bespoke Overcoat (1956) - Fender
- No Road Back (1957) – Rudge Harvey
- Carry On Admiral (1957) – Orderly (uncredited)
- Hell Drivers (1957) – Tinker
- A Tale of Two Cities (1958) – Jerry Cruncher
- I Was Monty's Double (1958) – The Small Man
- I Only Arsked! (1958) – Excused Boots Bisley
- The Millionairess (1960) – Fish Curer
- Help! (1965) – Doorman
- Bindle (One of Them Days) (1966) – Joseph Bindle
- Doctor in Clover (1966) – Fleming
- Alfie (1966) – Harry
- The Sandwich Man (1966) – Yachtsman
- A Funny Thing Happened on the Way to the Forum (1966) – Gatekeeper
- A Challenge for Robin Hood (1967) – Pie Merchant
- The Fearless Vampire Killers (1967) – Shagal, the Inn-Keeper
- Up the Junction (1968) – Charlie
- The Fixer (1968) – Potseikin (uncredited)
- The Magnificent Seven Deadly Sins (1971) – Mr. Spencer (segment "Pride")
- Come Play with Me (1977) – Kelly / Luigi
- Revenge of the Pink Panther (1978) – Fernet
- Moonraker (1979) – consumptive Italian
- High Rise Donkey (1980) – Donkey Derby photographer
