= The Best of Enemies (1961 film) =

1961 film

- Directed by: Guy Hamilton; Alessandro Blasetti
- Screenplay by: Jack Pulman
- Story by: Luciano Vincenzoni
- Starring: David Niven; Alberto Sordi; Michael Wilding; Amedeo Nazzari; Harry Andrews; David Opatoshu
- Cinematography: Giuseppe Rotunno
- Edited by: Tatiana Morigi
- Music by: Nino Rota
- Production company: Dino De Laurentiis Cinematografica
- Distributed by: De Laurentiis
- Release date: 26 October 1961 (Italy)
- Running time: 104 minutes
- Country: Italy
- Box office: £1.088 million

The Best of Enemies (I due nemici) is a 1961 Italian film directed by Guy Hamilton and Alessandro Blasetti set during the World War II East African Campaign, but filmed in Israel. It stars David Niven, Alberto Sordi and Michael Wilding. It was nominated for four Golden Globe awards in 1963, winning the Samuel Goldwyn International Award.

== Plot ==
In 1941 Abyssinia (Ethiopia) in Italian East Africa during the Second World War, British Army Major Richardson is taken prisoner by an Italian detachment on the march in the desert when Burke, the pilot of his reconnaissance airplane, manages to crash. He is questioned by Captain Blasi, but gives only his name, rank and serial number. A British night attack is repulsed, but Italian Major Fornari is killed, leaving Blasi in charge. As time goes on, Blasi and Richardson come to irritate each other.

Blasi decides to let the two escape to tell their superiors how ineffectual his force actually is, in the hope that the British will not think them worth bothering about. However, Richardson is ordered to take his motorized squadron and round up Blasi's unit. Blasi and his men reach a fort, where supposedly the rest of their forces are rallying, but they find only abandoned equipment. Minutes later, Richardson's armored cars show up. Blasi, under the prodding of his friend Bernasconi, reluctantly agrees to surrender, though he is angry at what he considers his betrayal at Richardson's hands. He balks at Richardson's terms and has his Italian infantrymen sneak out the back, ordering most of his African soldiers to remain behind and surrender in an hour given as a deadline.

Furious at being made a fool of, Richardson chases them into hilly terrain, against Captain Rootes' advice. After Blasi dismisses four African tribal warriors for misbehaving, they sneak behind the British and set a fire in the forest which destroys their armored cars and supplies. Both sides flee to an island in a nearby lake.

After the fire dies down, they start marching across the desert, the outnumbered Italians as prisoners of war. When they reach a native village, the headman states he supports the Allied side and asks for the Italians' weapons and the Italians themselves, but Richardson refuses to part with either. They stop in an abandoned village because a British officer is too sick to be moved, only to find themselves surrounded by many hostile natives, led by the headman Richardson dealt with before. While they wait, Richardson and Blasi become acquainted. Richardson makes the decision to arm the Italians, but then discovers they left the Italian ammunition behind. He decides to have everyone sneak away, six at a time, down a gully, but that just makes it easier for the natives to capture them. After their weapons and boots are stolen, they are allowed to leave and take their war away with them.

They reach a road. Blasi is delighted to find a road sign that indicates they are 150 miles behind Italian lines. He and his men march away. Shortly afterward, however, Richardson encounters a British convoy on its way to a victory celebration; the Italians have been defeated. Blasi and his men are recaptured. The two units meet again at a railway station. Richardson has his men present arms to show his new-found respect.

== Cast ==
- David Niven as Major Richardson
- Alberto Sordi as Captain Blasi
- Amedeo Nazzari as Major Fornari
- Michael Wilding as Burke
- Harry Andrews as Captain Rootes
- Noel Harrison as Lieutenant Hilary
- David Opatoshu as Bernasconi
- Aldo Giuffrè as Sergeant Todini
- Tiberio Mitri as Private Moccia
- Alessandro Ninchi as Second Lieutenant Del Pra
- Pietro Marascalchi as Corporal Bortolini
- Bruno Cattaneo as Private Mattone
- Giuseppe Fazio as Sergeant Spadoni
- Ignazio Dolce as Sentinel
- Ronald Fraser as Perfect
- Duncan Macrae as Sergeant Trevethan
- Bernard Cribbins as a soldier
- Michael Trubshawe as Colonel Brownhow
- Robert Desmond as Private Singer
- Kenneth Fortescue as Lieutenant Dicky Thomlinson

== Release ==
The Best of Enemies was distributed theatrically in Italy by De Laurentiis on 26 October 1961. It grossed a total of 1,088,040,000 lire domestically. It was released in the United States on 6 August 1962.

At the 15th British Academy Film Awards, the film was nominated for the United Nations award, as well Best Foreign Actor for Alberto Sordi.
