= Bernard Bresslaw =

English actor and comedian (1934–1993)

- Born: 25 February 1934; Stepney, London, England
- Died: 11 June 1993 (aged 59); Regent's Park, London, England
- Occupations: Actor; comedian
- Years active: 1954–1993
- Height: 6 ft 7 in (201 cm)
- Spouse: Betty Wright (m. 1959)
- Children: 3
- Awards: Most Promising Newcomer Variety Club of Great Britain

Bernard Bresslaw (25 February 1934 – 11 June 1993) was an English actor and comedian. He was best known as a member of the Carry On film franchise. Bresslaw also worked on television and stage, performed recordings, and wrote a volume of poetry.

== Early life ==
Bernard Bresslaw was born the youngest of three boys to second-generation Polish Jewish immigrants in Stepney, London, on 25 February 1934. His father was a tailor's cutter. He attended the Coopers' Company's School in Tredegar Square, Bow, London, and became interested in acting after visits to the Hackney Empire. At the start of World War II, Bresslaw and his older brothers, Arnold Sidney and Stanley, were evacuated to Swindon, where they lived with railway worker Wallace Findlay and his family.

London County Council awarded him a scholarship to train at the Royal Academy of Dramatic Art, where at 17 he won the Emile Littler Award as the most promising actor.

== Career ==
After appearing in Educating Archie on radio and The Army Game on television, more television, film and Shakespearean theatre roles followed. His first Carry On film was Carry On Cowboy in 1965.

Bresslaw's catchphrase, in his strong Cockney accent, was "I only arsked" (sic), first used in The Army Game, and later revived in Carry On Camping (1969).

At 6 ft 7 in (2.01 m), he was the tallest of the Carry On cast, head and shoulders over fellow Carry On regular Barbara Windsor, who was 4 ft 10 in (1.47 m). Because of his height, he was briefly considered for the part of the Creature in Hammer's Curse of Frankenstein (1957), which ultimately went instead to 6 ft 5 in (1.96 m) Christopher Lee. Bresslaw later made a comedy version of Dr. Jekyll and Mr. Hyde for Hammer titled The Ugly Duckling (1959). He made great efforts to prepare for roles, for example learning Fanagalo phrases for Carry On Up the Jungle (1970).

Bresslaw played Varga, the lead villain in the 1967 Doctor Who story The Ice Warriors. He played the genie on the Sooty Show and voiced Gorilla in Yorkshire TV's animated series The Giddy Game Show (1985–1987).

== Other works ==
=== UK chart singles ===
- "Mad Passionate Love/You Need Feet" (1958) (UK No. 6)
- Michael Medwin, Bernard Bresslaw, Alfie Bass, and Leslie Fyson: "The Army Game/What Do We Do in the Army?" (1958) (UK No. 5)
- "Charlie Brown/The Teenager's Lament" (1959)
- "Ivy Will Cling/I Found a Hole" (1959)

=== Stage actor ===
Bresslaw performed with The English Stage Company, the Royal Shakespeare Company, the Young Vic and the Chichester Festival Theatre. One of his last stage performances was as Malvolio in Twelfth Night at the Open Air Theatre, Regent's Park (1990).

Bresslaw's other roles included playing Mephistopheles, alongside James Warwick in the title role, in an Oxford Stage Company regional touring production of Doctor Faustus in 1987, and the genie in the lamp in Aladdin at the Theatre Royal, Newcastle, in the 1990s.

=== Song ===
Bresslaw's song "You Need Feet" (a parody of "You Need Hands" by Max Bygraves) was used in the Rutles' TV special, accompanying the Yoko Ono film parody "A Thousand Feet of Film". This was cut from the syndicated version and the original DVD release, but was restored (along with other cut footage) in later DVD releases.

=== BT adverts ===
Bresslaw, together with Miriam Margolyes, appeared with English comedienne Maureen Lipman in a series of British Telecom advertisements in the late 1980s. Bresslaw and Margolyes played Gerald and Dolly, a nervous couple who drop in unannounced on Lipman's character Beatrice "Beattie" Bellman and her husband Harry.

=== Poetry ===
Bresslaw was the author of a privately published volume of poetry, Ode to the Dead Sea Scrolls.

== Personal life ==
Bresslaw was married to the dancer Betty Wright from 1959 until his death in 1993. They had three sons.

Bresslaw was a member of the Grand Order of Water Rats, a British entertainment fraternity and in 1988 he was elected "King Rat" of the order.

== Death ==
Bresslaw died of a sudden heart attack on 11 June 1993. He had collapsed in the green room at the Open Air Theatre in Regent's Park, London, where he was to play Grumio in the New Shakespeare Company's production of Taming of the Shrew. His body was cremated at Golders Green Crematorium, north London, where his ashes were buried on 17 June 1993.

== Filmography ==
=== Films ===
- The Men of Sherwood Forest (1954) as Garth (uncredited)
- The Glass Cage (1955) as Ivan the Terrible, Cossack Dancer (uncredited)
- Satellite in the Sky (1956) as Technician (uncredited)
- Up in the World (1956) as Williams (uncredited)
- High Tide at Noon (1957) as Tom Robey (uncredited)
- Blood of the Vampire (1958) as Tall Sneak Thief
- I Only Arsked! (1958) as Popeye Popplewell
- Too Many Crooks (1959) as Snowdrop
- The Ugly Duckling (1959) as Henry Jekyll
- It's All Happening (1962) as Parsons
- Z Cars Cage Until Tame (1964) as Arthur 'Arty' Timmins
- Carry On Cowboy (1965) as Little Heap
- Morgan: A Suitable Case for Treatment (1966) as Policeman
- Carry On Screaming! (1966) as Sockett
- Follow That Camel (1967) as Sheikh Abdul Abulbul
- Carry On Doctor (1967) as Ken Biddle
- Carry On Up the Khyber (1968) as Bungdit Din
- Carry On Camping (1969) as Bernie Lugg
- Moon Zero Two (1969) as Harry
- Spring and Port Wine (1970) as Lorry Driver
- Carry On Up the Jungle (1970) as Upsidasi
- Carry On Loving (1970) as Gripper Burke
- Up Pompeii (1971) as Gorgo
- The Magnificent Seven Deadly Sins (1971) as Mr Violet (segment "Avarice")
- Carry On at Your Convenience (1971) as Bernie Hulke
- Blinker's Spy-Spotter (1972) as South
- Carry On Matron (1972) as Ernie Bragg
- Carry On Abroad (1972) as Brother Bernard
- Carry On Girls (1973) as Peter Potter
- Carry On Dick (1974) as Sir Roger Daley
- Vampira (1974) as Pottinger
- One of Our Dinosaurs Is Missing (1975) as Fan Choy
- Carry On Behind (1975) as Arthur Upmore
- In the Movies it Doesn't Hurt (1975) as several
- Joseph Andrews (1977) as Parson Trulliber (uncredited)
- Jabberwocky (1977) as The Landlord
- The Fifth Musketeer (1979) as Bernard
- Hawk the Slayer (1980) as Gort
- Krull (1983) as Rell the Cyclops
- Asterix and the Big Fight (1989) as Obelix (English version, voice)
- Leon the Pig Farmer (1992) as Rabbi Hartmann
- Bernard Bresslaw: A Story About Bernard Bresslaw (2009)

=== Television series ===
- Nom-de-Plume: "The Man from the Sea" (1956) as Dominic
- The Adventures of Robin Hood The Black Patch as Sir Dunstan's Captain
- The Army Game (1957–1958) 7 episodes as Pvt. 'Popeye' Popplewell
- Our House (1961–1962) 22 episodes as William Singer
- Carry On Christmas Specials and Carry On Laughing
- Danger Man: The Outcast, as Leo (1964)
- Emergency - Ward 10 (1966) Series 2, Episode 3 as Alf Beaumont
- Doctor Who serial The Ice Warriors (1967) as Varga, an Ice Warrior
- Doctor in the House (13 September 1969) Series 1, Episode 10 (The Rocky Mountain Spotted Fever Casino) as Malcolm
- The Goodies Series 2 (1 October 1971) episode Scotland as the zookeeper.
- Men of Affairs (1974) 1 episode as Hall Porter
- Sykes (7 November 1974) Series 3 Episode 4 (The Band) as Johnny Brunswick
- Sherlock Holmes and Doctor Watson (1979–1980) 2 episodes as Smythe
- Terry and June (16 November 1982) Series 5 Episode 5 (Playing pool) as Morris
- Mann's Best Friends (1984) 6 episodes as Duncan
- The Giddy Game Show (1985–1987) 52 episodes as 'Gorilla' (voice only)
- T-Bag (1987) Series 3 (in one episode) as Omar
- The Book Tower (1987–1988) as presenter
- The Young Indiana Jones Chronicles (1993) Series 2, Episode 20 as Very Big Man
