= Bootsie and Snudge =

British TV sitcom (1960–1974)

- DVD cover: series 2
- Also known as: Bootsie and Snudge in Civvy Life (series 1)
- Genre: Sitcom
- Created by: Marty Feldman; Barry Took
- Starring: Alfie Bass; Bill Fraser; Clive Dunn; Robert Dorning
- Country of origin: United Kingdom
- Original language: English
- No. of series: 4
- No. of episodes: 104

Production
- Running time: 30 minutes
- Production company: Granada Television

Original release
- Network: ITV
- Release: 23 September 1960 – 30 May 1963
- Release: 16 October – 20 November 1974

Related
- The Army Game; Foreign Affairs

Bootsie and Snudge is a British sitcom that aired on ITV for three series from 1960 to 1963, with a fourth in 1974. The show is a spin-off of The Army Game, a sitcom about soldiers undertaking national service, and follows two of the main characters (played by Alfie Bass and Bill Fraser) after they returned to civilian life. The first series is titled Bootsie and Snudge in Civvy Life. Between the 1963 and 1974 series, a spin-off called Foreign Affairs was broadcast.

== Background ==
Bass and Fraser acted together in minor roles in the 1956 comedy film Jumping for Joy starring Frankie Howerd and possibly developed a friendship from that point.

Private Montague 'Bootsie' Bisley and Sergeant-Major Claude Snudge are two of the main characters in the successful sitcom The Army Game that aired from 1957 to 1961. Snudge enjoys his position of superiority over Bootsie, whilst Bootsie feels comfortable in his position as it allows him to mock and hate Snudge (and attack authority in general). Clive Dunn plays 83-year-old Henry, despite being only 38 at the time. Dunn is introduced as "Meadows" then seconds later screen time, he is called "Johnson". In 1961 a comic strip was published in TV Comic telling the story of how Bootsie and Snudge began.

A large team of writers wrote for the series over its 104 episodes. Those that wrote for the 1960–63 episodes were Marty Feldman, Barry Took, John Antrobus, Ray Rigby, David Cumming, Derek Collyer, Peter Miller, James Kelly, Peter Lambda, Stanley Myers, Tom Espie, Jack Rosenthal, Harry Driver, Patrick Ryan, John Smith and Doug Eden. The 1974 series was written by David Climie, Ronnie Cass and Lew Schwarz.

The series established the reputation of actor Clive Dunn as a player of old men in comedies, leading to his more famous role as Corporal Jones in Dad's Army, along with release of a hit single, "Grandad" in 1971.

== Cast ==
- Alfie Bass – Montague 'Bootsie' Bisley
- Bill Fraser – Claude Snudge
- Clive Dunn – Henry Beerbohm Johnson (series 1 – 3)
- Robert Dorning – Hesketh Pendleton (series 1 – 3)

== Plot ==
=== Series 1 to 3 ===
Bootsie and Snudge are de-mobbed from their national service and are employed as handyman and hall porter respectively at the Imperial, a Pall Mall gentleman's club run by hot-headed secretary Hesketh Pendleton. One of their colleagues, the bumbling Henry Beerbohm Johnson, has worked at the Imperial for 40 years and to begin with believes Snudge is Lord Kitchener. Storylines revolve around the club's members and guests and the relationships between the four members of staff. Hesketh Pendleton has no time for anyone who disagrees with him, and will drown out their attempts to talk by saying "Tup! Tup!" louder and louder until they give up. Bootsie naturally refers to him as "Ol' Tup-tup".

=== Series 4 ===
Ten years later, and the positions have reversed as Bootsie wins £1 million on the Football pools and Snudge – an employee of Permapools – becomes his self-appointed financial adviser.

== Episodes ==
A total of four series of Bootsie and Snudge were made, the first three in black-and-white and the final series in colour. The first series of 40 episodes aired from 23 September 1960 to 23 June 1961 on Fridays at 8.55 pm. The second series, consisting of 29 episodes, was shown from 27 October 1961 to 10 May 1962 – originally on Fridays at 8.55 pm then Thursdays at 8.30pm. The third series, also of 29 episodes, broadcast from 8 November 1962 to 30 May 1963 on Thursdays at 7.30 pm. The final series, of just six episodes, went out over a decade later from 16 October 1974 to 20 November 1974, on Wednesdays at 8.30 pm.

Not all 104 episodes of Bootsie and Snudge have survived. Four episodes are missing from the archives, episode 40 from series 1 and three episodes from the third series ("The Rescue", "Soul Mates" and "Carnet de Balham").

== DVD releases ==
The surviving 39 episodes of series one were released by the Network imprint on 13 August 2012. The complete second series was released on 22 July 2013. Previously a single episode of Bootsie and Snudge had been released on The Army Game – Volume 2 DVD on 14 August 2006.

== Media spin-offs ==
The sitcom was adapted into a comic strip by Bill Titcombe.

== See also ==
- British sitcom
