= The Army Game =

British TV sitcom (1957–1961)

- Imagery from the board game
- Genre: Sitcom
- Created by: Sid Colin
- Starring: William Hartnell; Michael Medwin; Geoffrey Sumner; Alfie Bass; Charles Hawtrey; Bernard Bresslaw; Norman Rossington; Bill Fraser; Ted Lune; Frank Williams; Harry Towb; Mario Fabrizi; Robert Desmond; Dick Emery
- Country of origin: United Kingdom
- Original language: English
- No. of series: 4
- No. of episodes: 156

Production
- Running time: 30 minutes
- Production company: Granada Television

Original release
- Network: ITV
- Release: 19 June 1957 – 20 June 1961

The Army Game is a British television sitcom that aired on ITV from 19 June 1957 to 20 June 1961. It was the first ITV sitcom and was made by Granada, and created by Sid Colin. It follows the exploits of Hut 29, a dysfunctional group of soldiers and their National Service conscription into the British Army during the post war years.

The original cast consisted of William Hartnell, Michael Medwin, Geoffrey Sumner, Alfie Bass, Charles Hawtrey, Bernard Bresslaw and Norman Rossington. The cast would change over the years with actors such as Bill Fraser, Ted Lune, Frank Williams, Harry Fowler and Dick Emery appearing in subsequent series.

The popularity of the series inspired a film spin-off, I Only Arsked! (1958), and a top ten hit. It also produced the successful sitcom Bootsie and Snudge starring the popular characters played by Bass and Fraser.

== Background ==
The creator, Sid Colin, was inspired by a 1956 film, Private's Progress, that starred Ian Carmichael, Richard Attenborough and Terry-Thomas. William Hartnell had a supporting role similar to that of Sergeant-Major Bullimore in The Army Game.

Writers included Sid Colin, Larry Stephens, Maurice Wiltshire, Lew Schwarz, John Jowett, John Antrobus, John Foley, Marty Feldman, Barry Took, David Climie, David Cumming, Derek Collyer, Brad Ashton, John Junkin, Talbot Rothwell, Sidney Nelson, Stan Mars, Bob Perkins and Alan MacKinnon. At least three episodes are uncredited.

== Cast ==
Character	Series 1	Series 2	Series 3	Series 4
Maj. Upshot-Bagley	Geoffrey Sumner			Geoffrey Sumner
Sgt. Maj. Percy Bullimore	William Hartnell			William Hartnell
Cpl. Springer	Michael Medwin	Michael Medwin		
Pte. Montague "Excused Boots" Bisley	Alfie Bass	Alfie Bass	Alfie Bass	
Pte. "Cupcake" Cook	Norman Rossington; Keith Banks (some episodes)			
Pte. "Professor" Hatchett	Charles Hawtrey; Keith Smith (some episodes)			
Pte. "Popeye" Popplewell	Bernard Bresslaw			
Sgt. Maj. Claude Snudge	Bill Fraser	Bill Fraser	Bill Fraser	
Capt. Pilsworthy	Bernard Hunter			
Maj. "Fishy" Upshot-Bagley	Jack Allen			
Pte. Leonard Bone		Ted Lune	Ted Lune	Ted Lune
Cpl. "Flogger" Hoskins		Harry Fowler	Harry Fowler	Harry Fowler
Capt. T. R. Pocket		Frank Williams	Frank Williams	Frank Williams
Maj. Geoffrey Gervais Duckworth		C.B. Poultney		
L/Cpl. Ernest "Moosh" Merryweather			Mario Fabrizi	Mario Fabrizi
Pte. Dooley			Harry Towb	
Pte. Billy "Noddy" Baker			Robert Desmond	
Pte. "Chubby" Catchpole				Dick Emery

== Plot and characters ==
The show centres on a group of conscripts assigned to the Surplus Ordnance Department at Nether Hopping, Staffordshire. Billeted in Hut 29, the men are determined to work little and have fun.

Geoffrey Sumner played Major 'Piggy' Upshot-Bagley, the commanding officer, with William Hartnell as Company Sergeant Major (CSM) Percy Bullimore, the bane of Hut 29's army life. Michael Medwin was the spiv-like Corporal Springer in charge of Hut 29, with the original conscripts consisting of Bernard Bresslaw's IQ deficient Private (Pre) Popplewell, Alfie Bass's Pte 'Excused Boots' Bisley, Charles Hawtrey's Pte 'Professor' Hatchett and Norman Rossington's Pte 'Cupcake' Cook.

Later series saw Frank Williams as Captain T. R. Pockett take over the running of the camp, with Bill Fraser's Sgt Claude Snudge replacing Bullimore; although Sumner and Hartnell would return for the final series. Other popular characters included Harry Fowler's Cpl 'Flogger' Hoskins (a replacement for Medwin's Springer) and Ted Lune's Pte Leonard Bone, a sort of northern England variation on Bresslaw's Popplewell.

Arguably the break-out character of the series was Bresslaw's Popplewell who would go on to be the lead of the film version, I Only Arsked! (1958), which used his catch-phrase as its title. On the back of the series Bresslaw became a star of the late fifties and would also use the Popplewell characteristics for other roles of the period, such as the 1959 films Too Many Crooks and The Ugly Duckling. After Bresslaw left, Bass and Fraser's Bootsie and Snudge would become the most popular characters, and would get their own spin-off series, Bootsie and Snudge, which aired in September 1960, whilst the final series of The Army Game started.

== Episodes ==
=== Series One (1957–1958) ===
1. "The Missing Pig" (19 June 1957)
2. "The Misguided Missiles" (3 July 1957)
3. "The Convicts Return" (17 July 1957)
4. "Open Day" (31 July 1957)
5. Episode 5 (14 August 1957)
6. "The New Man" (28 August 1957)
7. "The Mad Bull" (11 September 1957)
8. "The Still" (25 September 1957)
9. "The Volunteers" (9 October 1957)
10. "The Civilian Clerk" (23 October 1957)
11. "Security" (6 November 1957)
12. "The Rise And Fall of Private Popplewell" (20 November 1957)
13. "The Chit" (27 November 1957)
14. "The New Officer" (4 December 1957)
15. "The Thing From Outer Space" (20 December 1957)
16. "W.R.A.A.C.S." (27 December 1957)
17. "Getting Shot of Upshot-Bagley" (3 January 1958)
18. "The Quarrel" (10 January 1958)
19. "Any Complaints" (17 January 1958)
20. "To A Haggis" (24 January 1958)
21. "The Marshall's Baton" (31 January 1958)
22. "Brothers in Law" 8 (7 February 1958)
23. "That's The Ticket" (14 February 1958)
24. "The Kindest Man in Britain" (21 February 1958)
25. "Brother Officers" (28 February 1958)
26. "The Recruits" (7 March 1958)
27. Episode 26 (14 March 1958)
28. Episode 27 (21 March 1958)
29. "Bring on the Dancing Girls" (28 March 1958)
30. "The Quiz Kids" (4 April 1958)
31. "Guinea Pigs" (11 April 1958)
32. "The Investigator" (18 April 1958)
33. "The NATO Visitor" (25 April 1958)
34. "Money To Burn" (2 May 1958)
35. "The Initiative Test" (9 May 1958)
36. "A Piece of Cake" (16 May 1958)
37. "Treasure Trove" (23 May 1958)
38. "Derby Day" (30 May 1958)
39. "Poetry Prize" (6 June 1958)
40. "Insurance" (13 June 1958)

=== Series Two (1958–1959) ===
1. "The Special Investigator" (19 September 1958)
2. "A Soldier's Farewell" (26 September 1958)
3. "The Invisible Soldier" (3 October 1958)
4. "The Garden Fete" (10 October 1958)
5. "Fit as a Fiddle" (17 October 1958)
6. "The Bogus Sergeant Major" (24 October 1958)
7. "Happy Birthday Major Duckworth" (31 October 1958)
8. "The Phantom Strikes Again" (7 November 1958)
9. "The Flying Visitors" (14 November 1958)
10. "Dodging the Draft" (21 November 1958)
11. "Amateur Talent" (28 November 1958)
12. "Dinner is Served" (5 December 1958)
13. "X Marks the Spot" (12 December 1958)
14. "The Happy Couple" (19 December 1958)
15. "Ebeneezer Scrooge" (26 December 1958)
16. "The Desperate Hours" (2 January 1959)
17. "Officer Material" (9 January 1959)
18. "Grand Hotel" (16 January 1959)
19. "Bootsie's Butler" (23 January 1959)
20. "The C.O.'s Aunt" (30 January 1959)
21. Episode 21 (6 February 1959)
22. "St Valentine's Day" (13 February 1959)
23. "That's the Ticket" (20 February 1959)
24. "The Folk Singers" (27 February 1959)
25. "The Initiative Test" (6 March 1959)
26. "Friday the Thirteenth" (13 March 1959)
27. "The Old Car" (20 March 1959)
28. "The Separation" (27 March 1959)
29. "I Was Snudge's Double" (3 April 1959)
30. "The Military Mission" (10 April 1959)
31. "All Quiet on the Western Front" (17 April 1959)
32. "The System" (24 April 1959)
33. "The Eating Contest" (1 May 1959)
34. "The Siege" (8 May 1959)
35. "The Soldier's Chorus" (15 May 1959)
36. "The Fiddler's Return" (22 May 1959)
37. "Bang You're Dead" (29 May 1959)
38. "The Trouble with Bootsie" (5 June 1959)
39. "Strength Through Day" (12 June 1959)

=== Series Three (1959–1960) ===
1. "Snudge and Jimmy O'Goblin" (9 October 1959)
2. "The Take-Over Bid" (16 October 1959)
3. "Enter a Dark Stranger" (23 October 1959)
4. "Snudge's Budgie" (30 October 1959)
5. "Where There's Smoke" (30 October 1959)
6. "The Camera Never Lies" (6 November 1959)
7. "When the Poppies Bloom Again" (13 November 1959)
8. "Miracle in Hut 29" (20 November 1959)
9. "Night Train to Itchwick" (27 November 1959)
10. "Officers and Gentlemen" (27 November 1959)
11. "Tiger Bisley" (4 December 1959)
12. "The Bisley Court Martial" (11 December 1959)
13. "The Long Walk" (18 December 1959)
14. "Happy New Year" (1 January 1960)
15. "The Invisible Man" (8 January 1960)
16. "The Bowler Hatting of Pocket" (15 January 1960)
17. "The Soft Life" (22 January 1960)
18. "Son of Snudge" (29 January 1960)
19. "A Rocket Called FRED" (5 February 1960)
20. "Don't Send My Boy to Prison" (12 February 1960)
21. "A Piece of Cake" (19 February 1960)
22. "Never Volunteer" (26 February 1960)
23. "A Marriage has been Arranged" (4 March 1960)
24. "The Good Old Days" (11 March 1960)
25. "A Question in the House" (18 March 1960)
26. "The Claude Snudge Story" (25 March 1960)
27. "April Fool" (1 April 1960)
28. "Goodnight Ladies" (8 April 1960)
29. "One of the Lads" (15 April 1960)
30. "Holding the Baby" (22 April 1960)
31. "Pen Pals Anonymous" (29 April 1960)
32. "Are You Receiving Me" (6 May 1960)
33. "The Efficiency Expert" (13 May 1960)
34. "Bull by the Horn" (20 May 1960)
35. "A Touch of the Other" (27 May 1960)
36. "The Feud" (3 June 1960)
37. "Out of this World" (10 June 1960)
38. "Emergency Hut 29" (17 June 1960)

=== Series Four (1960–1961) ===
1. "The Return of the Pig" (27 September 1960)
2. "The Informer" (4 October 1960)
3. "The Do-Gooders" (11 October 1960)
4. "The Marshal's Baton" (18 October 1960)
5. "Insurance" (25 October 1960)
6. "It's in the Book" (1 November 1960)
7. "Waltzing Matilda" (8 November 1960)
8. "The Kindest Man in Britain" (15 November 1960)
9. "Say It With Flowers" (22 November 1960)
10. "Music Hath Charms" (29 November 1960)
11. "Suddenly This Write" (6 December 1960)
12. "Quiz Kids" (13 December 1960)
13. "The Artist" (20 December 1960)
14. "Private Cinders" (27 December 1960)
15. "Tunes of Glory" (3 January 1961)
16. "Now It Can Be Told" (10 January 1961)
17. "Keep It Out of the Draught" (17 January 1961)
18. "Outward Bound" (24 January 1961)
19. "All at Sea" (31 January 1961)
20. "Decline And Fall" (7 February 1961)
21. "My Funny Valentine" (14 February 1961)
22. "Any Complaints?" (21 February 1961)
23. Episode 23 (28 February 1961)
24. "The Beast of Nether Hopping" (7 March 1961)
25. "The Green Fingers" (14 March 1961)
26. "Cold Cure" (21 March 1961)
27. "The Man Who Never Was" (28 March 1961)
28. "Poison Pen" (4 April 1961)
29. "Into The Breach" (11 April 1961)
30. Episode 30 (18 April 1961)
31. "Vice Versa" (25 April 1961)
32. "The Body in the Bath" (2 May 1961)
33. Episode 33 (9 May 1961)
34. "Fun And Adventure" (16 May 1961)
35. "A Certain Thing" (23 May 1961)
36. "Tea And Sympathy" (30 May 1961)
37. "The D-Day Dodger" (6 June 1961)
38. The Importance of Being Eric (13 June 1961)
39. Episode 39 (20 June 1961)

== Other media ==
A film based on the series, I Only Arsked!, appeared in 1958, made by Hammer Film Productions. The plot concentrated on Bernard Bresslaw's character and included Michael Medwin, Alfie Bass, Geoffrey Sumner, Charles Hawtrey and Norman Rossington playing their characters. "I Only Arsked" became Bresslaw's catchphrase.

A record was released sung by Michael Medwin, Bernard Bresslaw, Alfie Bass and Leslie Fyson. In June 1958, it reached number five in the UK Singles Chart. Bresslaw's song "Mad Passionate Love", sung in the style of Private Popplewell, also did well in the charts.

A paperback was produced, and Granada brought out a board game in 1959.

Alfie Bass and Bill Fraser's characters turned up in a spin-off, Bootsie and Snudge, between 1960 and 1963 and in 1974. Bootsie and Snudge also appeared in the 1964 sitcom Foreign Affairs.

A year after the series debuted saw the first Carry On film, the very similar Carry On Sergeant (1958), which also featured Hartnell, Hawtrey and Rossington.

== Royal Variety Performance ==
In June 1959, Michael Medwin, Alfie Bass, Norman Rossington, Bill Fraser and Ted Lune performed a short The Army Game scene at the Royal Variety Performance in front of Queen Elizabeth the Queen Mother. This was the last Royal Variety Performance not to be televised, although highlights were broadcast on BBC radio on 29 June 1959.

== DVD releases ==
Of the 156 episodes made, 50 are thought to survive. On 6 June 2005, Network released the first 26 episodes from series 3 on DVD under the title The Army Game – Volume 1. On 14 August 2006, the remaining twenty-four episodes (including three surviving episodes from the first series) were released under the title The Army Game – Volume 2. An episode of Bootsie and Snudge was included. The Army Game Collection, containing every surviving episode, was released on 13 August 2008.

== See also ==
- British sitcom

== Bibliography ==
- Mark Lewisohn, Radio Times Guide to TV Comedy, BBC Worldwide Ltd, 2003
