= Boys in Brown =

1949 British film by Montgomery Tully

- Directed by: Montgomery Tully
- Written by: Montgomery Tully
- Based on: play Boys in Brown by Reginald Beckwith
- Produced by: Antony Darnborough
- Starring: Jack Warner; Richard Attenborough; Dirk Bogarde
- Cinematography: Cyril Bristow; Gordon Lang
- Edited by: James Needs
- Music by: Doreen Carwithen
- Production company: Gainsborough Pictures
- Distributed by: General Film Distributors
- Release date: December 1949
- Running time: 85 minutes
- Country: United Kingdom
- Language: English
- Box office: £94,000 (by 1953)

Boys in Brown is a 1949 black and white British drama film directed by Montgomery Tully and starring Jack Warner, Richard Attenborough, Dirk Bogarde and Jimmy Hanley. It was written by Tully based on the 1940 play Boys in Brown by the actor Reginald Beckwith.

The film depicts life in a borstal for young offenders. The title comes from the borstal uniform: brown shirt and shorts and a short brown tie.

== Plot ==
Teenager Jackie Knowles drives a getaway car in a robbery. He is captured and sentenced to serve three years in a borstal institution run by a sympathetic governor. He befriends Alfie and Bill.

During an in-house concert party Jackie sneaks into one of the staff rooms. He removes the light bulbs when a man enters he is unseen. But he is spotted and a fight ensues in which Jackie knocks the man out with a lamp. He thinks he has killed him. He escapes with half a dozen others including Alfie.

When caught the injured man awaits a critical operation in hospital and there may still be a murder charge. Alfie decides to confess to the crime not realising he might hang.

Jackie eventually confesses. His girl says she is happy to wait three years for him.

== Cast ==
- Jack Warner as Governor
- Richard Attenborough as Jackie Knowles
- Dirk Bogarde as Alfie Rawlins
- Jimmy Hanley as Bill Foster
- Barbara Murray as Kitty Hurst, Jackie's girlfriend
- Patrick Holt as Tigson
- Andrew Crawford as Casey
- Thora Hird as Mrs. Knowles, Jackie's mum
- Graham Payn as Plato Cartwright
- Michael Medwin as Alf 'Sparrow' Thompson
- John Blythe as 'Bossy' Phillips
- Alfie Bass as 'Basher' Walker
- Stanley Escane as Bert
- Martin Tiffen as Dusty
- Philip Stainton as Principal prison officer
- Ben Williams as Borstal Master
- Cyril Chamberlain as Mr. Johnson
- Tony Quinn as Mr. Knight
- Elspeth March as Mrs. Smith
- Frederick Leister as the Judge

== Production ==
The film was shot at Pinewood. Associate producer Alfred Roome called it a "near disaster".

== Critical reception ==
The Monthly Film Bulletin wrote: "the film creditably abstains from exploiting its serious subject in a sensational way," and from the "excellent cast" the critic singled out "Richard Attenborough and Thora Hird, a compelling appearance by Jack Warner as the Governor marred only by a tendency to hang out flags when he is about to deliver a message; and the "boys" (surely a little old for Borstal?) include Jimmy Hanley, Dirk Bogarde and Michael Medwin."

Picturegoer wrote: "Dirk Bogarde, who, as Alfie, gives a tremendous performance as a subtly persuasive evil influence. A warmly human story surrounds Kitty (Barbara Murray), the girl Jackie left behind him. Another strongly sympathetic influence is portrayed to perfection by Jimmy Hanley, who becomes an 'Old Borstalian,' and poignantly becomes a 'new boy' once more."

Picture Show wrote: "Well acted, sincere and authentic in atmosphere, this drama has a Borstal setting and sets out to show the difficulty in making a juvenile delinquent into a solid citizen, and points out, too, that it is much easier to make a weak but basically honest citizen into a confirmed delinquent. It suffers from slowness and the Borstal 'boys' are too mature to be convincing youths, but it states the problem clearly, although offering no solution whatever."

Time Out wrote: "The fairly outspoken (for 1949) script criticises a system portrayed as suffering from cash starvation (echoed by the film's own rock-bottom budget) yet required to cope with hordes of incorrigibles: a recidivism rate of 75 per cent is indicated. It's a blend of cosy stereotypes, reforming zeal and post-war disillusion amounting to a gloomy admonition not to expect very much from life. A British noir, in that sense."
