= Geoffrey Sumner =

British actor (1908–1989)

- Geoffrey Sumner
- Born: 20 November 1908; Ilfracombe, England
- Died: 29 September 1989 (aged 80); Alderney, Channel Islands
- Occupation: Actor

Geoffrey Sumner (20 November 1908 – 29 September 1989) was a British actor. As well as appearing in a number of films, he was also a commentator for British Movietone News.

His parents were Edmund and Kathleen Marion (Brook). He married Gwen Williams Roberts in 1967 after the death of his first wife, Mary Richards with whom he had three daughters.

In 1957 he played Major Upshot-Bagley in the first series of The Army Game, broadcast by ITV Granada. He reprised the role in the 1958 film I Only Arsked!, based on the TV series.

A sample of "Train Sequence" ("This is a journey into sound") from the 1958 LP A Journey Into Stereo Sound was used by different artists like Eric B. & Rakim in their track "Paid in Full", Bomb the Bass ("Beat Dis"), Public Enemy ("Welcome to the Terrordome"), Anthrax ("Potters Field"), Handsome Boy Modeling School ("Holy Calamity (Bear Witness II)"), Luke Vibert ("Ambalek"), Gotye ("A Distinctive Sound") and Jauz x Marshmello ("Magic").

In September 1968 Sumner played Sir Lancelot Spratt in the BBC radio series of Doctor in the House, alongside Richard Briers.

== Partial filmography ==
- Hold My Hand (1938) − Solicitor's Clerk (uncredited)
- Too Many Husbands (1938) − Captain Corrie
- Premiere (1938) − Captain Curry
- The Gang's All Here (1939) − Flats' Superintendent (uncredited)
- Lucky to Me (1939) − Fanshaw
- "Nasti" News From Lord Haw-Haw (1939−1940) − Lord Haw Haw
- Yes, Madam? (1939) − Scoffin (uncredited)
- She Couldn't Say No (1940) − Announcer
- Law and Disorder (1940)
- Old Mother Riley in Society (1940) − George (Party Guest) (uncredited)
- General Election (1945) − narrator
- While the Sun Shines (1947) − A Peer
- Mine Own Executioner (1947) − Parkinson (uncredited)
- Easy Money (1948) − Nightclub Patron (segment The Night Club Story) (uncredited)
- The Perfect Woman (1949) − Well Dressed Man On Underground (uncredited)
- Helter Skelter (1949) − Humphrey Beagle
- Dark Secret (1949) − Jack Farrell
- Traveller's Joy (1950) − Lord Tilbrook
- The Dark Man (1951) − Major
- A Tale of Five Cities (1951) − Wingco
- Appointment with Venus (1951) − Major − Vet. Corps
- The Happy Family (1952) − Sir Charles Spanniell
- Top Secret (1952) − Pike
- Those People Next Door (1953) − F / Lt. Claude Kimberley
- Always a Bride (1953) − Teddy
- The Dog and the Diamonds (1953) − Mr. Gayford
- Don't Blame the Stork (1954) − BBC Reporter at Baby Show (uncredited)
- Doctor in the House (1954) − Forensic Lecturer (uncredited)
- Five Days (1954) − Chapter (uncredited)
- The Flying Eye (1955) − Colonel Audacious
- The Silken Affair (1956) − Minor Role (uncredited)
- I Only Arsked! (1958) − Major Upshott−Bagley
- Band of Thieves (1962) − The Governor
- Cul−de−sac (1966) − Christopher's Father
- That's Your Funeral (1972) − Lord Lieutenant
- Side by Side (1975) − Magistrate
- There Goes the Bride (1980) − Gerald Drimond (final film role)
