= I Only Arsked! =

1958 British film by Montgomery Tully

- British quad poster
- Directed by: Montgomery Tully
- Screenplay by: Sid Colin; Jack Davies
- Produced by: Anthony Hinds
- Starring: Bernard Bresslaw; Michael Medwin; Alfie Bass
- Cinematography: Lionel Banes
- Edited by: James Needs; Alfred Cox
- Music by: Benjamin Frankel
- Production companies: Granada Productions; Hammer Film Productions
- Distributed by: Columbia Pictures Corporation (UK)
- Release dates: 11 November 1958 (London, UK)
- Running time: 82 minutes
- Country: United Kingdom
- Language: English

I Only Arsked! is a 1958 British comedy film directed by Montgomery Tully and starring Bernard Bresslaw, Michael Medwin and Alfie Bass. The screenplay was by Sid Colin and Jack Davies based on the television series The Army Game (1957–1961). It was made by Hammer Films.

== Plot ==
Slapstick ensues when inept army recruits are transferred to a post in the Middle East.

== Cast ==
- Bernard Bresslaw as Private "Popeye" Popplewell
- Michael Medwin as Corporal Springer
- Alfie Bass as Private "Excused Boots" Bisley
- Geoffrey Sumner as Major Upshott-Bagley
- Charles Hawtrey as Private "Professor" Hatchett
- Norman Rossington as Private "Cupcake" Cook
- David Lodge as Sergeant "Potty" Chambers
- Arthur Howard as Sir Redvers
- Marne Maitland as King Fazim
- Michael Bentine as Fred
- Francis Matthews as Mahmoud
- Michael Ripper as Azim
- Wolfe Morris as Salaman
- Ewan MacDuff as Ferrers
- Basil Dignam as General Bender
- Martin Boddey as Colonel Danvers
- Claire Gordon as harem girl
- Marie Devereux as harem girl

== Reception ==
=== Box office ===
According to Kinematograph Weekly the film performed "better than average" at the British box office in 1959. Variety also said the film was one of the most popular of the year in Britain.

=== Critical ===
The Monthly Film Bulletin wrote: "Two acid take-offs of memorable scenes in Bridge on the River Kwai and a few moments of communal insanity from the five practised actors who take the brunt of the action are the highlights of this modest and relaxed army lark. There is no departure here from the tradition of service farces, except that some, at least, of its humour is composed of private jokes inherited from the TV programme from which the idea was taken."

Allmovie wrote, "The level of humour in I Only Arsked! will perhaps best be appreciated by fans of the original series."

TV Guide noted "An enjoyable British slapstick comedy."

In British Sound Films: The Studio Years 1928–1959 David Quinlan rated the film as "average", writing: "Hit TV series goes east to mix satire with slapstick."
