= Ted Lune =

British actor (1920–1968)

Ted Lune (born Harold Garnett; 18 August 1920 – 7 January 1968) was a British actor, best known for portraying Private Len Bone in the TV series The Army Game. He also worked in radio comedy and appeared in a couple of films.

He was born in Ainsworth, Lancashire. After leaving school at 15 and serving an engineering apprenticeship, he began entertaining people by, for example, reciting Stanley Holloway monologues, and he became well known in the Bolton area. He married Florence Baker in 1943, and they had two daughters, Lynne and Anne. He turned professional in 1947, taking his stage name from the River Lune that flows through Lancashire, and his older brother's name. Harold and Florence later divorced and in 1953 he married an entertainer, Valerie J. Tanner, known professionally as Valerie Joy.

In 1954, his career had stalled so he and Valerie Joy left the variety circuit and took a pub, the Raglan, in Hulme, just a short step from Hulme Hippodrome. The following year, he was called out of retirement as an emergency replacement for Frank Randle who had been taken seriously ill. Ted, not too reluctantly, left the pub to take over Randle's pantomime commitment, and later, his Blackpool season. That gave his career the boost it needed, leading to his role of Private Bone in The Army Game.

In the summer of 1965, Lune performed at Gwrych Castle where he would perform on the weekdays along with the organist Alex King in 'The Castle Show' and 'The Castle Party Night'.

He died in Selsey, Sussex, aged 47, after a long illness.

== Filmography And Discography ==
Filmography

Year	Title	Role	Notes
1959	The Lady Is a Square	Harry Shuttleworth	
1967	Berserk!	Skeleton Man	
1968	Turn-up for Tony	Tramp	(final film role)

Discography

Singles
Year	A-Side	B-Side
1960	Mr. Custer	Time Machine
