= Leslie Fyson =

English singer (1923–1996)

- Born: 13 July 1923; Lambeth, London
- Died: 26 October 1996 (aged 73) Hounslow, London
- Genre: Opera
- Occupation: Singer
- Years active: 1940s-80s

Leslie James Fyson (13 July 1923 – 26 October 1996) was an opera singer who was credited on a top 5 hit in the UK singles chart in 1958.

== Career ==
=== Opera ===
He studied music at King's College, Cambridge, although his studies were cut short by the Second World War. In 1942 he enlisted in the Queen's Royal West Surrey Regiment and transferred to the Royal Artillery in July 1943.

On demob he took up studies once more at the Guildhall School of Music, and his tenor style attracted him to Jani Strasser, the chief vocal coach of the Glyndebourne Operatic Company, resulting in small roles at the Glyndebourne Festival Opera for several years; he made his debut as a servant in Un ballo in maschera by Giuseppe Verdi in 1949.

He was also a member of the Ambrosian Singers and the Cliff Adams Singers, appearing on Sing Something Simple for over 30 years, and chorus master at the English National Opera in the early 1980s. His last known broadcast was appearing in the Gilbert and Sullivan opera Patience; or, Bunthorne's Bride on BBC Radio 2 in October 1989.

=== Chart success ===
Fyson's one chart success was as one of the quartet singing the theme tune to The Army Game, although he did not appear in the series; he opened the recording with an impression of a stereotypical sergeant-major, and was given a credit. The recording reached number 9 in the Disc and number 10 in the Melody Maker singles charts in June 1958, and number 5 in the New Musical Express and Record Mirror charts the following month.

He appeared on another charting disc, providing vocals to the track "I Like You" on the Donovan album Cosmic Wheels, in 1973.

== Personal life ==
Fyson was married to Isobel Wright in Newcastle-upon-Tyne in October 1949; she died in 1994. Fyson died in the West Middlesex Hospital on 26 October 1996.
