= Barry Took =

English comedian (1928–2002)

- Born: 19 June 1928; Wood Green, London, England
- Died: 31 March 2002 (aged 73); Enfield, London, England
- Resting place: New Southgate Cemetery and Crematorium, London, England
- Writing career
- Period: 1957–1999
- Genres: Radio, television
- Notable works: The Army Game (1957–1961); Bootsie and Snudge (1960–64, 1974); Round the Horne (1965–68); One-Upmanship (1976–78)

Barry Took (19 June 1928 – 31 March 2002) was an English writer, television presenter and comedian. His decade-and-a-half writing partnership with Marty Feldman led to the television series Bootsie and Snudge, the radio comedy Round the Horne and other projects.

He is also remembered in the UK for presenting Points of View, a BBC Television programme featuring viewers' letters on the BBC's output, and the BBC Radio 4 programme The News Quiz.

Took was known as the "Father of Monty Python", for bringing together the comedy performers who would establish Monty Python's Flying Circus.

== Early life and education ==
The son of a manager at the Danish Bacon Company, Took was born in Victoria Road, Muswell Hill, north London, and lived in Winton Avenue, Bounds Green. When evacuated to Wisbech in Cambridgeshire during the Second World War, he ran away from his assigned home there, cycling 20 miles to Peterborough in order to get a train back to London. He attended Stationers School but left at the age of 15. His elder brother Philip would eventually work for the US Space Program before dying as a young man.

== Career ==
With his limited education, Took found work as an office boy for a publisher and a cinema projectionist. During his period of National Service in the Royal Air Force, in which he played the trumpet, he began performing and later worked as a stand-up comedian, eventually becoming a West End revue performer, working on For Amusement Only and For Adults Only.

Took's best comedy writing was done in collaboration with Marty Feldman, whom he first met in 1954. The two men wrote for several television shows in the 1950s and 1960s, including The Army Game and its spin-off Bootsie and Snudge. He co-wrote Beyond Our Ken for two series (1958–59) with Eric Merriman for BBC Radio before leaving after a disagreement with his fellow writer. With Marty Feldman he wrote most episodes of Round the Horne; the intermittent partnership between them continued until 1974.

In the late 1960s, Took became comedy advisor to the BBC, and was responsible for bringing together the performers who formed Monty Python's Flying Circus before he moved to the US to work briefly on Rowan and Martin's Laugh In. He returned to the UK in early 1970 and was involved in setting up the BBC series The Goodies, although he had returned to take up the position of Head of Light Entertainment at London Weekend Television. He resigned from this position when Stella Richman, his superior and the Director of Programming, was dismissed. On the Move (1975–76), a programme linked to a national campaign to promote adult literacy, was written by Took and featured Bob Hoskins and Donald Gee. He was involved in two further television series in support of this initiative, Your Move and Write Away.

In 1977, Took hosted his own comedy sketch show, Took and Co. Also featuring Robin Bailey, Chris Emmett, Andrew Sachs and Gwen Taylor, the series ran for seven episodes late at night on ITV.

In 1979, he became chairman of The News Quiz on BBC Radio 4, a role he filled until 1981 and again from 1986 to 1995. In the same year he became a presenter of Points of View, staying with the programme for over seven years.

In 1983 he became known to a younger TV audience when he presented the quiz What's It? on the BBC1 Saturday-morning show Saturday Superstore, in its first series.

Took also hosted the BBC Radio 2 comedy panel game The Impressionists, which included Peter Goodwright, Roger Kitter, David Jason and Dave Evans and, in 1998, the single-series revival of Twenty Questions, Guess What?.

He had seven books published, including his autobiography and several histories of comedy. He also wrote Kenneth Williams's life story for the Oxford Dictionary of National Biography in 1996.

== Personal life and final years ==
During his time with the Royal Air Force Took met his first wife, Dorothy "Dot" Bird, who was serving in the Women's Royal Air Force. They married in 1950 and had three children (Barry, Susan and David), but divorced. In 1964, he married Lynden "Lyn" Leonard, this second marriage resulting in a daughter named Elinor. The couple separated in 1999, and eventually divorced. Took also spoke publicly about his experiences with depression and of undergoing extensive psychotherapy for several years.

After suffering from bladder cancer during the 1970s, he was diagnosed with cancer of the oesophagus in 1999, and suffered a stroke four weeks after undergoing major surgery. He died on 31 March 2002, aged 73.

== Autobiography ==
- A Point of View (1990)
