= Cosmetic =

Cosmetic may refer to:

- Cosmetics, or make-up, substances to enhance the beauty of the human body, apart from simple cleaning
- Cosmetic, an adjective describing beauty, aesthetics, or appearance, especially concerning the human body
- Cosmetic, a topical product that is not a drug
- In-game cosmetics, video game virtual goods that generally offer no competitive advantage
  - Skin (video games), an appearance option for characters, equipment, and others
- "Cosmetics" (To the Manor Born), a 1981 television episode

== See also ==
- Cosmetic surgery
- Cosmetic packaging
- Conservation and restoration of vehicles (disambiguation), restoration work on a vehicle that improves its appearance rather than its functionality or structure
- Cosmeceutical
