= List of To the Manor Born episodes =

The following is a list of episodes for the British sitcom To the Manor Born, that first aired on BBC1 from 30 September 1979 to 29 November 1981, and for a one-off special on 25 December 2007.

Each episode from the original series is thirty minutes long. The episodes were not originally broadcast with episode titles, although many have unofficial working titles. The first series aired for seven episodes on Sundays at 8.45pm, the second series for six episodes on Sundays at 8.35pm and the seven-episode Series Three on Sundays at 7.15pm. The Christmas special aired at 8.00pm. All episodes aired on BBC1. In 2007, a one-hour Christmas Day special, featuring Penelope Keith, Peter Bowles, Angela Thorne and Gerald Sim reprising their original roles, aired at 9.30pm on BBC One.

Several episodes received high audience figures. In 1979, the last episode of the first series received 23.95 million viewers, the fourth-highest figures for any programme in the UK in the 1970s and the highest for a non-live event. The following year, 21.55 million people watched the series two finale, the fifth-highest viewing figure for the 1980s. The 1981 finale, when Audrey and Richard marry, received 17.80 million viewers. The 2007 Christmas Special was watched by 10.25 million viewers, and was the sixth most watched programme for that week.

== Series overview ==
Series
Series	Episodes	Originally released	
Series	Episodes	First released	Last released
1	7	30 September 1979	11 November 1979
Special		25 December 1979	
2	6	5 October 1980	9 November 1980
3	7	18 October 1981	29 November 1981
Special		25 December 2007	

== Episodes ==
=== Series 1 (1979) ===
No. overall	No. in series	Title	Directed by	Written by	Original release date
1	1	"Grantleigh"	Gareth Gwenlan	Peter Spence	30 September 1979
Richard DeVere, the millionaire founder of "Cavendish Foods", visits Grantleigh to be shown round Grantleigh Manor Lodge by estate agent J.J. Anderson. Richard is disappointed with it, and instead insists on being shown round the manor house, while the Lady of the Manor Audrey fforbes-Hamilton is at her husband Marton's funeral. Audrey is less than devastated by Marton's death, as she can now run the estate; however, her solicitor Arnold Plunkett tells her during the reception that the Manor will have to be sold to pay off the mounting debts. She fails to buy it back at the auction when Richard outbids her at £876,000.
2	2	"All New Together"	Gareth Gwenlan	Peter Spence	7 October 1979
Marjory helps Audrey to pack before leaving the Manor, while Richard and his mother, who complains about moving house again, drive to Grantleigh. Audrey moves into the Old Lodge at the end of the drive. Later that day, on the pretence of needing sugar, Richard's mother visits the Lodge and has tea with Audrey. She tells Audrey that Richard was born Bedřich Polouvicka and came over from Czechoslovakia in 1939. Back at the Manor, Richard tells Mrs. Poo that he needs a social secretary and she suggests Audrey, not knowing she used to occupy the Manor. When Audrey and Richard next meet, they bet each other £50 on whether Richard will convince the woman from the Old Lodge to become his secretary. When Richard later visits the Old Lodge, he discovers that it is Audrey who lives there.
3	3	"Rhythms Of The Earth" "Going To Church"	Gareth Gwenlan	Peter Spence	14 October 1979
On his first Sunday at Grantleigh, Richard fails to turn up at church, to Audrey's annoyance. She goes to lecture him on his duties and responsibilities as Lord of the manor. Later, Mrs. Poo insists that Richard invite Audrey for dinner and she accepts on the condition he will accompany her to church the following day, Sunday. He agrees; however, the following morning Audrey turns up at church as the service is ending, having forgotten to put her antique Webster tall case clock, recently mended by Old Ned, one hour forward.
4	4	"Nation's Heritage"	Gareth Gwenlan	Peter Spence	21 October 1979
When Audrey sees Richard throw out an Adam fireplace from the old study, she goes to the Manor and lectures him about preserving the nation's heritage. She also mentions how her own mantelpiece is very small. When Audrey returns from the Manor, Marjory and Brabinger have discovered a beautiful old Portland stone hearth Inglenook fireplace, which was revealed while Brabinger was installing a servant bell. The servant bells aren't working at the Manor. The following day, Audrey spends the day with Richard, first helping him choose a hunter and then dining out with him. When they get back, Richard shows her that while they were out he has had installed in her drawing room, as a thank you, the Adam fireplace he threw out, covering the Inglenook hearth discovered the day before.
5	5	"The Summer Hunt Ball"	Gareth Gwenlan	Peter Spence	28 October 1979
At Mrs. Patterson's shop, Audrey talks to the Brigadier about the Summer Hunt Ball, which is always held at the Manor. Audrey refuses to organise it as she normally does, although she has sent out the invitations. She wants Richard to come to her on "bended knee"; however, he instead asks Marjory. A furious Audrey takes over, which was Richard's intention, but Marjory continues to organise it as well. On the day, Audrey and Marjory argue about a footbridge on the estate, which Audrey told Ned not to fix, contrary to Marjory's orders. When Audrey finds out that Marjory is going to the Ball as Richard's partner, she refuses to go and plays Scrabble with Brabinger instead. Richard visits her later on to apologise, but when he leaves Audrey directs him to the damaged footbridge.
6	6	"The Grape Vine" "A Holiday at Home"	Gareth Gwenlan	Peter Spence	4 November 1979
When Mrs. Poo complains of being bored, Richard agrees to holding a party. At the party, rumours spread that Richard has suspicious business dealings. Meanwhile, everyone tells Audrey that she should take a holiday. Shortly after, Audrey pretends to go on holiday to Málaga, with only Brabinger knowing she is really hiding at the Lodge. While she is 'on holiday', rumours spread when Marjory and Richard are seen going behind her house each evening, but they are actually watching badgers. When she 'returns' from holiday, Audrey gives a party and on the terrace Richard tells her he saw her in the Lodge while she was meant to be in Málaga. He agrees to keep quiet if she stops spreading the rumours about his suspicious business dealings.
7	7	"A Touch Of Class"	Gareth Gwenlan	Peter Spence	11 November 1979
Audrey is having money problems, and on her first ever visit to a supermarket, a "Cavendish Foods" store, she gives Polly, the cashier, a cheque she knows will bounce. In an attempt to appear more English, Richard is starring in an advert for "Fauntleroy's Old English Tonic" being filmed at the Manor. Audrey is curious to know what is going on and sends Brabinger over to find out; he is then asked to play the butler in the advert. Later, the director Bob Roberts (Blain Fairman) goes to the Lodge to ask to use Audrey's Rolls-Royce. She then tells him that the Manor is not Richard's ancestral home, but hers, which makes him worried about what the sponsors will say. A few days later, Audrey arrives at the Manor to take Richard to the Lord Lieutenant's charity gala, and the advert appears on the television, with Audrey not Richard. Guest starring Celia Imrie.

=== Christmas Special (1979) ===
No. overall	No. in series	Title	Directed by	Written by	Original release date
8	S	"The First Noel"	Gareth Gwenlan	Peter Spence	25 December 1979
With the fforbes-Hamiltons always providing the church's crib, Audrey, Marjory and Old Ned, who is acting as Audrey's butler while Brabinger is visiting his granddaughter, make a crib. However, when they go to place it in the church, Richard, having been asked by the Rector, has installed a brand new crib. After an initial argument, both favour the other's crib, but the Rector decides upon Richard's. On Christmas Day, Audrey and Marjory are both bored at the Lodge, having declined invitations to the Manor. Later in the day, an equally bored Richard and Mrs. Poo arrive at the Lodge, whereupon Audrey suggests they play Sardines.

=== Series 2 (1980) ===
No. overall	No. in series	Title	Directed by	Written by	Original release date
9	1	"The Farm Manager"	Gareth Gwenlan	Peter Spence	5 October 1980
Richard wants to make the Estate more efficient and more profitable, so employs a new Farm Manager, Mr. Spalding. Brabinger is away due to illness, so Ned takes his place temporarily while Richard renovates his tied cottage. Audrey suspects Richard wants to get rid of Ned by pawning him off on her, so she hosts a dinner party to prove how awful his cooking is.
10	2	"The Spare Room"	Gareth Gwenlan	Peter Spence	12 October 1980
Audrey and Marjory's old school friend, Diana ("Podge Hodge"), comes to stay after her divorce. Formerly quite large, the ladies believe it will be safe to have her stay at Richard's, due to Audrey's leaky roof. It turns out she's now quite lovely, and she and Richard enjoy riding together.
11	3	"Never Be Alone"	Gareth Gwenlan	Peter Spence	19 October 1980
Marjory goes away on residential course to produce Antony and Cleopatra, leaving Audrey so bored and lonely she invites tradesmen round to give her free estimates. Richard has bought a £40,000 Egyptian vase from Christie's, and it goes missing the day after he gets it home. The local police suggest he keep his eyes open for someone with unexpected money to spend, so Audrey becomes a suspect in the theft. Guest starring Roger Brierley.
12	4	"Tramps and Poachers"	Gareth Gwenlan	Peter Spence	26 October 1980
Arthur Smith, a tramp, makes his annual visit to the Estate, and Richard is forced to put him up while he does work on the Grantleigh Estate. Richard and the game keeper are trying to catch a poacher on the Estate. Guest starring: Bill Travers.
13	5	"The Honours List"	Gareth Gwenlan	Peter Spence	2 November 1980
As part of effort to modernise Grantleigh, Richard wants to destroy the hedgerows to enlarge the fields. Audrey leads the rest of the community to stop this, until she discovers that someone is going to receive an honour in the New Year's Honours List. Believing it's Richard, she turns on the protestors to curry favour with him.
14	6	"Vive Le Sport"	Gareth Gwenlan	Peter Spence	9 November 1980
After Audrey injures her back, her private doctor refuses to see her as she has not paid her bills, so she is forced to go to the NHS. Meanwhile, Richard is learning to ski before he goes on holiday, and he asks Audrey to go with him. Guest starring Celia Imrie.

=== Series 3 (1981) ===
No. overall	No. in series	Title	Directed by	Written by	Original release date
15	1	"Scout Hut"	Gareth Gwenlan	Peter Spence	18 October 1981
After her picnic with Marjory is disrupted by a bull, Audrey sponsors the local Boy Scouts for their raft race to raise funds for a new meeting hut and is annoyed to hear - erroneously - that Richard has refused sponsorship. Richard decides to "anonymously" donate a new scout hut, which everyone finds out thanks to the new cub leader, Mr. Spalding. Just after Audrey, as County Commissioner for the Girl Guides, leaves the scout hut with Rector the Scout leader, the building collapses. Richard and Audrey have a dreamy picnic together, which is rudely interrupted by the raft race and which lands Richard in the water.
16	2	"Station Closing"	Gareth Gwenlan	Peter Spence	25 October 1981
The local Marlbury railway station is to be closed, so Audrey launches a campaign to save it. Richard, however, secretly wants to buy it and plans to turn it into a cash and carry. It appears that fforbes-Hamilton family have a charter, that gives them rights to the land the station was built on, for 150 years. Then British Rail decide to keep the station open after all to service a new school, and Richard soon finds a new site. Guest starring Richard Thorp, Bruce Bould and William Moore. Maiden Newton station was used for the railway scenes. Other scenes were at Montacute, outside the School House.
17	3	"Horses Vs Cars"	Gareth Gwenlan	Peter Spence	1 November 1981
While Richard takes lessons in his new helicopter, Audrey cannot afford to have her Rolls-Royce mended, so while looking after the stables for Mrs. Proctor, she uses a horse instead. Hearing from his mother, that Audrey has presumably sold her Rolls-Royce, he buys her an Austin Mini Metro. Troubles arise when Mrs. Proctor breaks her arm, so the Meals on Wheels charity is in danger. Guest starring Gordon Peters. The scenes involving the parked horse getting a parking ticket were filmed in Montacute, at The Borough. The onlookers in the wide-angle shots are local villagers who came to watch the filming and found themselves included in the film. The presence of the temporary dummy parking ticket machine caused some confusion for visiting tourists.
18	4	"Birds Vs Bees"	Gareth Gwenlan	Peter Spence	8 November 1981
In an attempt to make money, Audrey starts keeping bees. Then a rare bird, a bee-eater, turns up on the Estate and it has to be guarded from twitchers. However, its rarity and its status as a protected species ensures that a lot of people come to see it walking past the Old Lodge, and Audrey's "Mrs. fforbes-Hamilton's Bee-eater Honey" suddenly starts selling remarkably well.
19	5	"Cosmetics"	Gareth Gwenlan	Peter Spence	15 November 1981
Richard is trying to get a lucrative deal with the head of a cosmetics firm, Mademoiselle Dutoit (Rula Lenska), who propositions him, so he invents a wife to get him out of the situation. Audrey agrees to act the part when Mademoiselle Dutoit comes to stay for the weekend, while Marjory pretends to be "Mrs. fforbes-Hamilton". Audrey is quick to use the masquerade to have a few alterations made to the estate as the rightful lady of the manor.
20	6	"Business Troubles" "Connections in High places"	Gareth Gwenlan	Peter Spence	22 November 1981
Richard's board of directors, seeing him as a foreign upstart, oppose his plans to build a refrigeration plant in Argentina and use it as an excuse to try and oust him as chairman of Cavendish Foods. Feeling sorry for him, Audrey enlists the aid of her wealthy, black-sheep uncle Greville Hartley (Ballard Berkeley), who is often seen spending time with a 'niece' at Brooks's club in St. James’s, as is Brigadier Lemington, along with Mr. Lumsden and Julian Gayforth, from Cavendish Foods. Audrey tells uncle Greville, that she is about to marry Richard and persuading the old gentleman to get his influential business friends to launch a rescue package and save Richard's job. A grateful Richard then gives Audrey a thank you present - a share in the company. Guest starring Peter Penry-Jones and John Barron.
21	7	"The Wedding" "Back to the Manor"	Gareth Gwenlan	Christopher Bond	29 November 1981
After Uncle Greville's sudden death, Richard has to sell the Manor so he can finance the refrigeration plant. In the auction, Audrey uses the money left to her in Uncle Greville's will to buy back the renovated and modernised Manor for £990,000, and then asks Richard to marry her. Written by Christopher Bond. Guest starring Peter Penry-Jones and Daniel Chatto.

=== Christmas Special (2007) ===
No. overall	Title	Directed by	Written by	Original release date	UK viewers (millions)
22	"Christmas Special"	Gareth Gwenlan	Peter Spence	25 December 2007	10.25
As Richard and Audrey prepare to celebrate their silver wedding anniversary, they both plan a surprise party for the other. However, before their anniversary, Audrey leaves Richard when he tells her that he owns "Farmer Tom", a supermarket supplier company that has put many neighbouring estates out of business. Audrey then stays with Marjory who now lives at the Lodge, while Richard goes to his mother's grave (his mother having died in 1988) to ask for help. He then arranges for a rock concert to be held on Grantleigh and a neighbouring estate owned by Archie Pennington-Booth, who has nearly gone bankrupt due to "Farmer Tom". The Manor is soon left with no staff, when Audrey gives them time off and Emmeridge (their butler) moves to the Lodge with Audrey. Richard and Archie go to the Magistrates' Court to apply for a licence for the concert. Audrey, who is strongly against holding a rock concert on the estate, is in Court and hears Richard tell the magistrate that he has changed his mind and will no longer hold the concert. However, this still does not make Audrey forgive him. The following day, their anniversary, Marjory leads Audrey to the Manor where Richard has arranged a surprise party, and she forgives him.
