= A Touch of Class =

(A) Touch of Class may refer to:

== Music ==
- A Touch of Class (band), also known as ATC, international pop group based in Germany
- A Touch of Class (album), 1978 big band jazz album by the Thad Jones/Mel Lewis Jazz Orchestra
- A Touch of Class, 1991 reggae album by Sugar Minott
- Touch of Class, a 1999 hip-hop album by Classified
- A Touch of Class, a 1999 Salsa album by Pete "El Conde" Rodríguez
- Touch of Class (band), an American R&B group active since 1975

== Film and television ==
- A Touch of Class (film), 1973 British comedy film
- "A Touch of Class" (Fawlty Towers), 1975 pilot episode of Fawlty Towers
- "A Touch of Class", 2004 season 1 episode of Hustle
- "A Touch of Class" (To the Manor Born), a 1979 television episode

== Other ==
- Touch of Class (horse), a thoroughbred mare on the 1984 US Olympic equestrian team
- A small amount of sophistication

== See also ==
- "A Touch of Glass", an episode of Only Fools and Horses
