= Rudling =

Rudling is a surname. Notable people with the surname include:

- John Rudling (1907–1983), English actor
- Per Anders Rudling (born 1974), Swedish-American historian
