= Jim'll Fix It =

British television show

- 1986 series titles
- Created by: Bill Cotton
- Starring: Jimmy Savile (1975–1994; 1995; 2007); Shane Richie (2011)
- Country of origin: United Kingdom
- Original language: English
- No. of series: 20; 1 (revival)
- No. of episodes: 286

Production
- Production location: BBC Television Centre
- Running time: 35 minutes

Original release
- Network: BBC One
- Release: 31 May 1975 – 24 July 1994
- Network: UKTV Gold
- Release: 5 April – 10 May 2007

Jim'll Fix It is a British television series broadcast by the BBC, presented by Jimmy Savile and running for almost two decades, between May 1975 and July 1994. Devised by Bill Cotton, the show encouraged children to write a letter to Savile with a "wish" that would come true at the end of each episode, upon which the child would be granted a medal. Famous people who appeared on the show included Muhammad Ali, Doctor Who stars Tom Baker and Colin Baker, Rolf Harris, Gary Glitter, Margaret Thatcher and Peter Cushing.

Jim'll Fix It was briefly revived in 2007 as Jim'll Fix It Strikes Again and a television special aired in 2011 following Savile's death. A year after Savile's death, allegations of child sex abuse against him arose relating to the television series.

== Development ==
The idea for a show based on viewers' requests came from the BBC's head of light entertainment, Bill Cotton, and the idea was originally offered to Harry Secombe, but he turned it down. The show was instead hosted by Top of the Pops presenter Jimmy Savile, who would "fix it" for the wishes of several viewers (usually children) to come true each week. The producer throughout the show's run was Roger Ordish, who later recalled that he had advised Cotton to choose a different presenter from Savile, saying "That was nothing to do with Jimmy Savile's moral behaviour, it had to do with his ability to communicate with young people. He did openly say: 'I hate children.'"

== Format ==
The standard format was that the viewer's letter, which described their wish, would be shown on the screen and read out aloud, initially by Savile, but in later series by the viewers themselves as a voice-over. Savile would then introduce the Fix, which would either have been pre-filmed on location or take place "live" in the studio. At the end, the viewer would join Savile to be congratulated and presented with a large medal with the words "Jim Fixed It For Me" engraved on it. Occasionally, other people featured in the "Fix It" (actors from well known series, for example), might also give the viewer an extra gift somehow relating to the Fix. Savile himself played no part in the filming or recording of the "fix-its", unless specifically requested as part of the letter writer's wish. Some children apparently thought that Savile's first name was "Jim'll", so some letters shown on the programme started "Dear Jim'll".

Early series saw Savile distributing medals from a "magic chair" which concealed the medals in a variety of compartments. The "magic chair" was invented by Tony Novissimo and was built for the BBC by him at his workshops in Shepherd's Bush. The chair had first appeared on Savile's earlier Saturday night TV series, Clunk, Click. The chair was later replaced by a new computer-controlled robotic "magic chair", the brainchild of Kevin Warwick, built for the BBC by his team at the University of Reading. The arm for the chair was an RTX robotic arm, designed by Roy Levell at Universal Machine Intelligence in Wandsworth around 1985.

Internally, the BBC were concerned that the show was providing excessive product placement for corporations.

== Notable "Fix-its" ==
Following Savile's death in 2011, the BBC cited famous examples of "fix-its" from the show, including the group of cub scouts who were sent to eat a packed lunch on a rollercoaster at the Blackpool Pleasure Beach, and the young viewer who played drums with Adam and the Ants for a performance of their track "Kings Of The Wild Frontier".

The Fourth Doctor, Tom Baker, appeared in the second episode, where he tore off and handed away the frayed ends of his scarf to girls visiting the studio. Ten years later, a young Doctor Who fan, Gareth Jenkins, took part in a short adventure titled A Fix with Sontarans with Colin Baker and Janet Fielding.

In 1976 Muhammad Ali appeared in a fix. Also that year, Rolf Harris, appeared on the show. Footage from this appearance was featured in the 2023 documentary Rolf Harris: Hiding In Plain Sight.

On 1 January 1977, Margaret Thatcher, then Leader of the Opposition, appeared in an episode when Savile introduced a group of children to her. In 1981, Savile asked her to appear on the show again. Thatcher, who was by this time prime minister, declined his request on that occasion.

Veteran actor Peter Cushing wrote to the show in 1986 to ask if a variety of rose could be named after his late wife; the 'Rose Helen Cushing' was the result. Also that year, a 14-year-old boy called Dom Lawson, who went on to work for Kerrang! and Metal Hammer magazines, got his wish to meet Iron Maiden and be their technician for a day. The episode was described in Iron Maiden's A Matter of Life and Death tour book, where Lawson speaks about Iron Maiden and his history with the band.

Former glam rock singer and convicted child sexual abuser Gary Glitter appeared on Jim’ll Fix It several times, including in 1991.

== 2007 revival (Jim'll Fix It Strikes Again) ==
This new series saw the return of Savile and began on 5 April 2007 on UKTV Gold, and was titled Jim'll Fix It Strikes Again. The series showed classic moments from the original shows, and attempted to 're-fix' it for some of the original participants.

== 2011 special ==
The BBC announced on 14 November 2011, following Savile's death, that the show would return for a one-time Christmas special on 26 December 2011, featuring Shane Richie as the programme's host. Only letters for 'fix-its' from children under 14 were eligible for the revived format. Lewis Hamilton guest-starred in this episode, as well as Girls Aloud member Kimberley Walsh and opera singer Alfie Boe.

== Theme song ==
The theme song was sung by voice-over artist Lynda Hayes. The closing theme was sung by the group Good Looks (featuring Lavinia & Lewis Rodgers, siblings of Clodagh Rodgers) who competed in the 1982 A Song for Europe competition. Savile "fixed it" for a young viewer to perform the song with the group on an edition of the show.

== Sexual abuse scandal ==
Allegations surfaced in 2012 that Savile sexually abused some of the children who took part in Jim'll Fix It, including suggestions that special episodes of Jim'll Fix It were devised by Savile in order to gain access to victims. Ordish said, "I didn't see anything and nothing was reported to me", but added that he knew Savile had a "predilection for younger females". Reflecting on his own time producing the show, Ordish added, "It's of no significance really compared to the terrible things that happened to the victims, but in retirement, people say: 'What did you do?'. I'd say: 'I was a BBC producer … Jim'll Fix It, I did that for 20 years', and you used to get a wonderful reaction. Now it's something I can’t mention, you’re ashamed of it."

== Transmission guide ==
=== Series ===
Series	No. of editions	Aired
1	12	31 May 1975 – 16 August 1975
2	7	21 February 1976 – 10 April 1976
3	8	1 January 1977 – 19 February 1977
4	11	7 January 1978 – 18 March 1978
5	12	30 December 1978 – 17 March 1979
6	12	29 December 1979 – 15 March 1980
7	13	26 December 1980 – 28 March 1981
8	13	2 January 1982 – 27 March 1982
9	14	25 December 1982 – 26 March 1983
10	14	25 December 1983 – 24 March 1984
11	13	29 December 1984 – 23 March 1985
12	13	11 January 1986 – 5 April 1986
13	13	3 January 1987 – 28 March 1987
14	13	2 January 1988 – 26 March 1988
15	13	7 January 1989 – 1 April 1989
16	13	6 January 1990 – 31 March 1990
17	13	19 January 1991 – 13 April 1991
18	13	4 April 1992 – 4 July 1992
19	13	10 April 1993 – 17 July 1993
20	13	2 April 1994 – 24 July 1994

Series	No. of editions	Aired
Jim'll Fix It Strikes Again	6	5 April 2007 – 10 May 2007

=== Specials ===
Title	Date
Christmas Special	24 December 1975
Bank Holiday Special	29 May 1976
Bank Holiday Special	28 August 1976
Christmas Special	24 December 1976
Bank Holiday Special	4 June 1977
Bank Holiday Special	29 August 1977
Christmas Special	26 December 1977
New Year Special	31 December 1977
Bank Holiday Special	27 May 1978
Bank Holiday Special	28 August 1978
Christmas Special	26 December 1978
Bank Holiday Special	28 May 1979
Bank Holiday Special	27 August 1979
Christmas Special	26 December 1979
Bank Holiday Special	26 May 1980
Bank Holiday Special	25 August 1980
Bank Holiday Special	25 May 1981
Bank Holiday Special	31 August 1981
Christmas Special	25 December 1981
Bank Holiday Special	31 May 1982
Bank Holiday Special	30 August 1982
Bank Holiday Special	30 May 1983
Bank Holiday Special	29 August 1983
Christmas Special	24 December 1984
10th Birthday Special	27 May 1985
Bank Holiday Special	26 August 1985
Christmas Special	24 December 1985
Bank Holiday Special	25 August 1986
Christmas Special	24 December 1986
Bank Holiday Special	25 May 1987
Bank Holiday Special	30 August 1987
Christmas Special	24 December 1987
Bank Holiday Special	28 May 1988
Christmas Special	26 December 1988
Christmas Special	26 December 1989
Sir Jim'll Fix It Special	8 July 1990
Christmas Special	26 December 1990
Christmas Special	28 December 1991
Christmas Special	28 December 1992
Christmas Special	27 December 1993
20 Years of Jim'll Fix It Special	2 January 1995
Jim'll Fix It with Shane Richie	26 December 2011

=== Compilations ===
- Series 2 Compilation: 17 April 1976
- Series 3 Compilation: 26 February 1977
- Series 4 Compilation: 25 March 1978
- Series 5 Compilation: 24 March 1979
- Series 6 Compilation: 22 March 1980
- Children in Need Compilation: 23 November 1984
- Series 13 Compilation: 27 August 1988
- Series 14 Compilation: 28 August 1989
- Series 15 Compilation: 25 August 1990
- Series 16 Compilation: 24 August 1991
- Series 17 Compilation: 29 August 1992
- Series 18 Compilation: 5 September 1993
