= World in Ferment =

British television satire series

World in Ferment is a 1969 British television satire series which parodied current affairs programs, celebrities, and broadcasters. The series was written by N. F. Simpson, produced by Ned Sherrin and directed by Roger Ordish. The series aired on BBC-2 for one season consisting of six episodes. The series starred Jack Shepherd as Doug Searchbaker, Irene Handl as Madame Astoria, Dinsdale Landen as Chris Champers, Angela Thorne as Nancy Chuff, John Bird as Gerald Pikestaff, Eleanor Bron as Hildegarde Schindelstein, and actors Doug Fisher, Queenie Watts, and Arthur Blake transforming into a variety of roles in sketch comedy fashion.

Reviews for the program were mixed. Critic Marjorie Bilbow in The Stage and Television Today wrote the following about the program's sketches, "Not every item was equally successful, but the standard was high enough to put this series into that rare class of comedy show that can be enjoyed on several levels." The review in the Television Mail was more critical, stating: "'World in Ferment' must be regarded as a failure to realize an idea — an idea which in no doubt made everyone fall about laughing when they first talked about it... It is essentially verbal fun, even literary fun, which does not translate well into visual terms."
