= Law and Disorder (1958 film) =

1958 British film by Charles Crichton

- U.S. theatrical poster
- Directed by: Charles Crichton
- Written by: T. E. B. Clarke; Patrick Campbell; Vivienne Knight
- Based on: Smugglers' Circuit by Denys Roberts
- Produced by: Paul Soskin
- Starring: Michael Redgrave; Robert Morley
- Cinematography: Ted Scaife
- Edited by: Oswald Hafenrichter
- Music by: Humphrey Searle
- Production companies: A Paul Soskin Production; British Lion Films Limited
- Distributed by: British Lion Film Corporation (UK)
- Release date: 10 June 1958 (London)
- Running time: 76 minutes
- Country: United Kingdom
- Language: English

Law and Disorder is a 1958 British crime comedy film directed by Charles Crichton and starring Michael Redgrave, Robert Morley, Joan Hickson, and Lionel Jeffries. It was based on the 1954 novel Smugglers' Circuit by Denys Roberts. The film was initially directed by Henry Cornelius, who died while making the film. He was replaced by Crichton.

== Plot ==
Percy Brand is a career criminal, a veteran of various cons and schemes, and he is regularly sent to prison by judge Sir Edward Crichton. That does not bother Percy too much, but what does concern him is that his son, Colin, should not discover what his father does. Percy tells him tales about being a missionary in China when he is released in 1938, a military chaplain in North Africa in 1941, and a freed prisoner of war in 1946 to cover his absences in gaol. While Percy is "away", Colin is cared for by Aunt Florence, who knows what Percy really does, while Percy's ill-gotten gains pay for Colin's education.

When Colin grows up, he chooses to become a barrister. By coincidence, he takes seven years to achieve his goal, the same duration as Percy's latest sentence. When Percy is freed, he arrives just after Colin is called to the bar. Colin informs him that he has secured a position as an unpaid marshal, i.e. an aide, to a judge to gain experience, and not just to any judge, but to Percy's nemesis, Edward Crichton. Percy decides to retire from his life of crime rather than risk coming into court and Colin seeing him there.

Retirement to a cottage on the south coast of England is not enough to keep Percy (and Florence) out of mischief. When he hears about the smuggling that took place before the conscientious Police Sergeant Bolton arrived, Percy gets involved in bringing in brandy from France, hidden inside sharks he "catches".

Then, an old acquaintance, Major Proudfoot, comes to see him. Proudfoot has planted a story that an explorer was murdered and robbed of £100,000-worth of emeralds he found in Brazil. Now he has a buyer lined up for the nonexistent jewels, which he wants Percy to pretend to smuggle in. Percy has a better idea, involving fake policemen and himself as a customs officer, but the plan goes awry when Judge Crichton arrives to meet his wife at Creekford Harbour, where she is arriving from abroad. Percy manages to steal a launch, but is eventually caught. To compound his misfortune, he is to be tried by Crichton, a last-minute substitute for a judge afflicted with gout.

Florence comes up with the idea to add a fake case to the court list to occupy Crichton's remaining time on that particular circuit court, with the assistance of Percy's friends and associates. Mary Cooper brings her publican husband into court over a purported slander repeatedly uttered by their pet parrot. However, the judge becomes fed up with the case and finally dismisses it, leaving Percy's trial for the next day. The gang members then try to frame Crichton by planting smuggled contraband in the car they arrange for the judge and Colin to take that night, and then making an anonymous call to tip off the police. Crichton decides to take a walk with Colin first, and they get lost. They inadvertently trigger a burglar alarm which is protecting a large house, and are taken at gunpoint to the police station by the owner of the house..

Colin later "confesses" to try to straighten things out, but he is not in time to prevent the judge and Percy from being driven in the same van to the court. Along the way, Percy confesses everything to Crichton, who says he has "a certain sympathy" for Percy. Accordingly, the judge sends Colin on an errand arranging his train journey back to London so that, when Percy is brought into the courtroom, Colin is not there. The judge then recuses himself, as he has had social contact with the defendant, leaving Colin none the wiser. Out on bail, but expecting another long prison sentence, Percy bids farewell to Colin, telling him that he has come out of retirement for one more trip.

== Trivia ==
Stanley Escane, who appeared in the 1947 Ealing Studios comedy Hue and Cry, also directed by Charles Chrichton, had one line (uncredited) as a police car driver.

The locations include the exterior of Wandsworth prison in London, Windsor & Eton railway station, and Fishguard Harbour in west Wales, which plays the part of "Creekford Harbour".

== Cast ==
- Michael Redgrave as Percy Brand
- Robert Morley as Judge Sir Edward Crichton
- Ronald Squire as Colonel Masters
- Elizabeth Sellars as Gina Laselle
- Joan Hickson as Aunt Florence
- Lionel Jeffries as Major Proudfoot
- Jeremy Burnham as Colin Brand
- Brenda Bruce as Mrs Mary Cooper
- Harold Goodwin as Blacky
- George Coulouris as Bennie [Bensuson]
- Meredith Edwards as Sergeant Bolton
- Reginald Beckwith as Vickery
- David Hutcheson as Freddie [Cooper]
- Mary Kerridge as Lady Crichton
- Michael Trubshawe as Ivan
- John Le Mesurier as Pomfret
- Irene Handl as woman in train
- Allan Cuthbertson as Police Inspector
- Sam Kydd as Shorty
- John Hewer as Foxy
- John Warwick as Police Superintendent
- Nora Nicholson as Mrs. Cartwright
- Anthony Sagar as Customs Officer
- John Paul as customs officer
- Alfred Burke as poacher
- Michael Brennan as prison warden
- Toke Townley as Rumpthorne
- Arthur Howard as Burrows
- John Rudling as man in train
- Gerald Cross as Hodgkin

== Production ==
Charles Crichton said "the producer was a clot of the first order, he didn't know what he was doing. I had to fight him all the time." Crichton says the producer cut out a sequence "without which the end of the film is pretty incomprehensible."

== Critical reception ==
A. H. Weiler wrote in The New York Times: "Robert Morley contributes an outstanding performance as the stern judge who finds himself as much outside the law as within it. Although he never cracks a smile, chances are he will force a few on the customers. As a matter of fact, they should find most of the cheerful disorders in Law and Disorder irreverently funny and diverting".

In British Sound Films: The Studio Years 1928–1959 David Quinlan rated the film as "good", writing: "An Ealing film in all but name, and not unworthy of the studio, if some way below their best."

The Radio Times Guide to Films gave the film 3/5 stars, writing: "This is a smashing little comedy from the Lavender Hill Mob [1951] pairing of director Charles Crichton and co-writer T.E.B. Clarke. Michael Redgrave is on sparkling form as a minor league crook whose detentions at Her Majesty's pleasure are explained away to his son as missionary excursions to Africa. The plot slows slightly after the son becomes judge Robert Morley's assistant and Redgrave slips into retirement."

British film critic Leslie Halliwell said: "Amusing, well-pointed caper on sub-Ealing lines."

The TV Guide review stated it had "a tight screenplay, with not a word wasted, and sharp acting by some of England's best characters. This is a good example of the 1950s Brit-coms and there is so much joy in watching Morley acting with Redgrave that it seems a shame a series of films weren't made with these two characters pitted against each other."
