= Cosmetic packaging =

Packaging for cosmetics

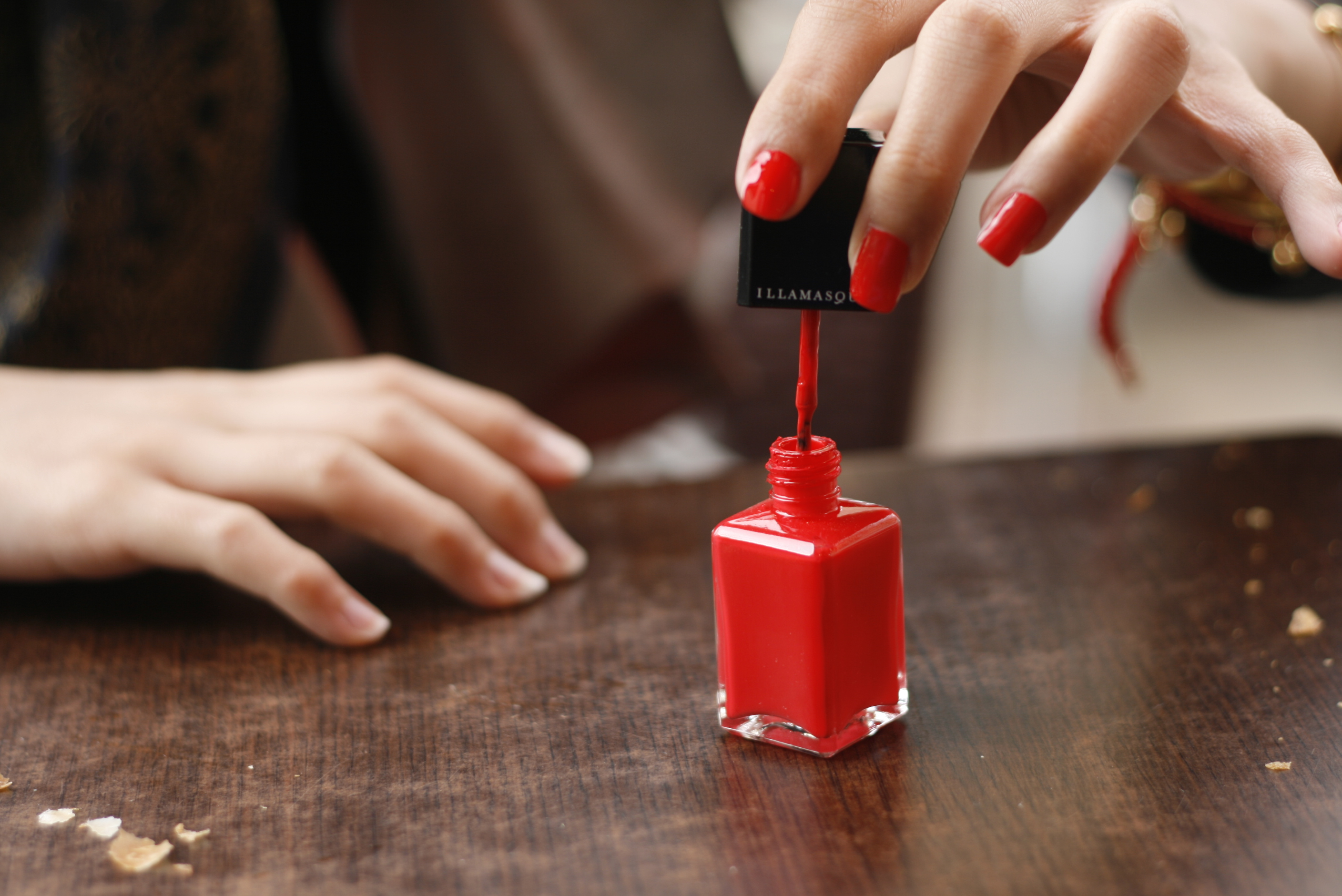
Nail polish in glass bottle with dispenser built into cap

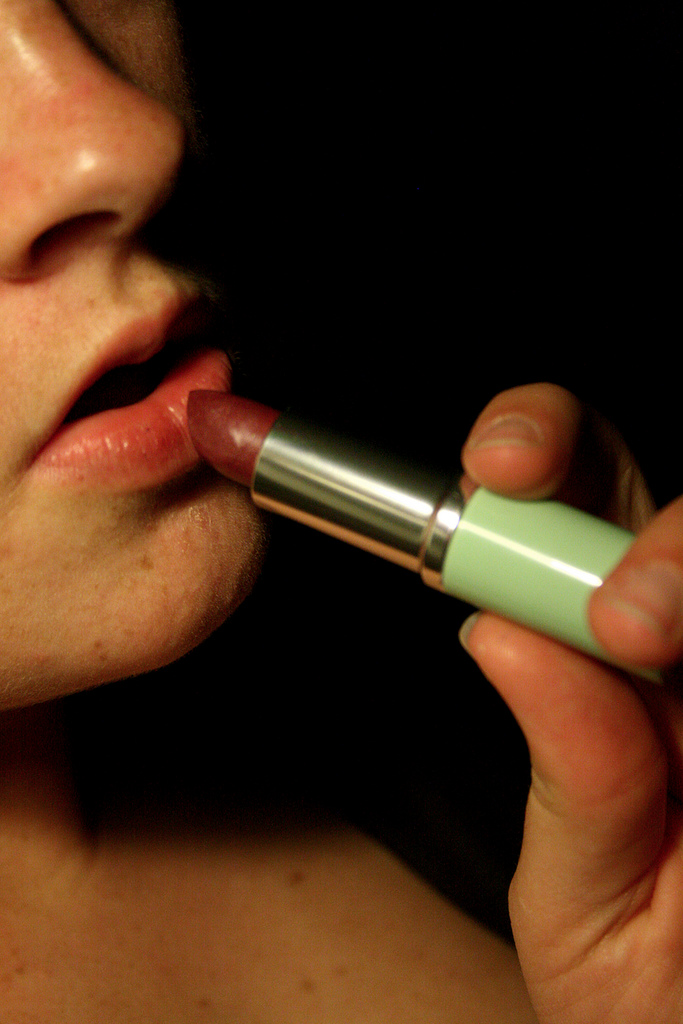
Lipstick in plastic disperser package

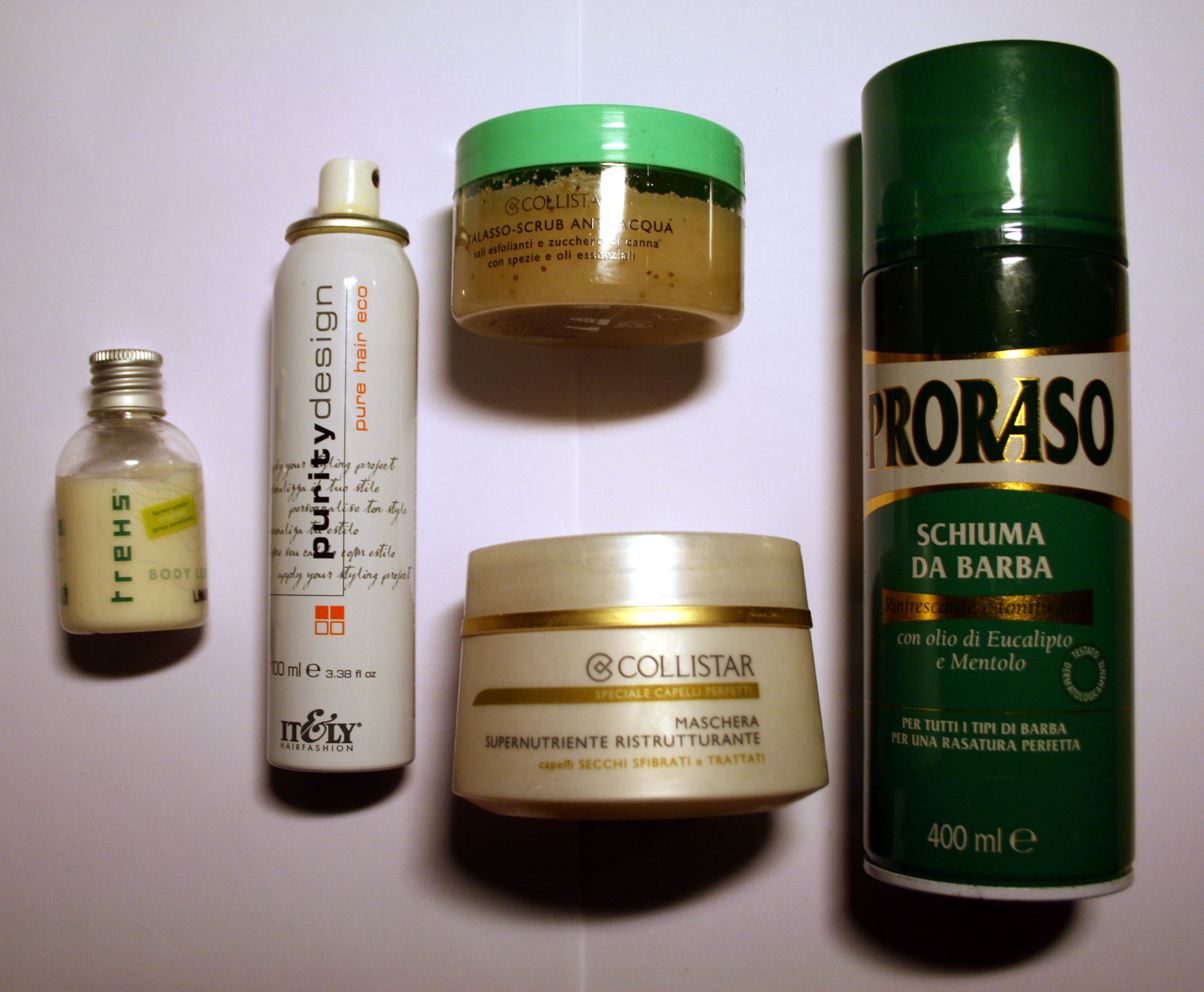
Examples from Italy

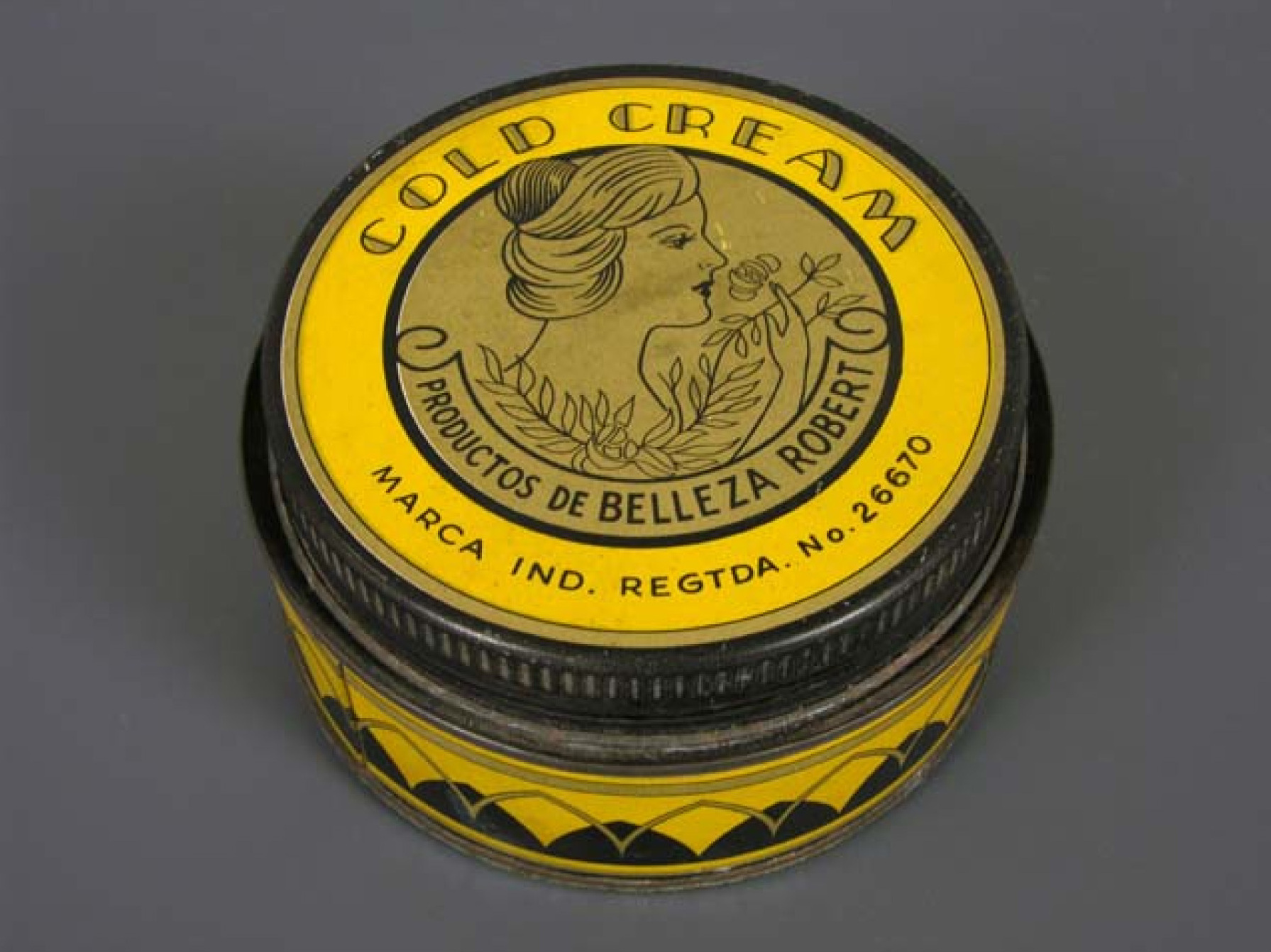
Jar for cold cream from the first half of the 20th century. From the Museo del Objeto del Objeto collection.

The term cosmetic packaging is used for containers (primary packaging) and secondary packaging of fragrances and cosmetic products. Cosmetic products are substances intended for human cleansing, beautifying and promoting an enhanced appearance without altering the body's structure or functions.

Cosmetic packaging is governed by an international norm set by the International Organization for Standardization and by national or regional regulations such as those of the EU or the FDA. Marketers and manufacturers must comply with these to distribute their products in the corresponding areas of jurisdiction.

== History ==
A cosmetic container, cosmetic box, or cosmetic vessel is found in the historical records, both as an artifact, as relief items in some cultures, and are sometimes referenced in historical or archaeological literature. They are sometimes created in specific styles, shapes, or motifs.

The named 'cosmetic vessel' in Ancient Greece is the pyxis. In Ancient Egypt artifacts of hieroglyphically inscribed kohl tubes are found; also kohl vessels, and kohl spoons, which were formed in stylized shapes relevant to Egyptian ideology, including specific hieroglyphs.

The use of the cosmetic vessel may extend to trinket items, car-keys, toiletry accessories, for example a nail clipper; as a non-toiletry storage container, it becomes an 'all-purpose' decorated, special-use vessel.

Containers are known from many societies, ancient and modern. The Native Americans of the Americas made small containers woven from basketry materials, including pine needles.

=== Ancient Egypt ===
In Ancient Egypt toiletry items began in the Predynastic Period with ivory cosmetic articles; also bone, stone, or pottery. Ivory combs, and kohl spoons were among the first, with many shapes; common themes for shapes became the ankh symbol, ducks, lotus flowers, etc. In the time of the Predynastic and Old Kingdom, bowls were also mechanically drilled, including miniature sizes, and were used in life and also included as grave goods. The bowls were either a type of unguent jar, or a toiletry "kohl cosmetic vessel". The desert sun or Nile floodwaters during inundation produced a need for facial-eye protection, using 'eyepaint' or eyeliner, when working in the flooded lands; theoretically it was also used by males. The creation of predynastic cosmetic palettes with their eyepaint 'mixing circle', may have been the start of the lineage of the kohl cosmetic artifacts. The famed Narmer Palette, which scholars believe to commemorate the unification of upper and lower Egypt, is believed to be such a cosmetic article, perhaps even for the cosmetics of the king.

== Description ==
The term cosmetic packaging includes primary and secondary packaging. Primary packaging, also called cosmetic containers, is housing the cosmetic product. It is in direct contact with the cosmetic product. Secondary packaging is the outer wrapping of one or several cosmetic containers. An important difference between primary and secondary packaging is that any information that is necessary to clarify the safety of the product must appear on the primary package. Otherwise, much of the required information can appear on just the secondary packaging. The cosmetic container shall carry the name of the distributor, the ingredients, define storage, nominal content, product identification (e.g., batch number), warning notices, and directions for use. The secondary packaging shall, in addition, carry the address of the distributor and information on the cosmetic's mode of action. The secondary packaging does not need to carry any product identification notice. In cases where the cosmetic product is only wrapped by one single container, this container needs to carry all the information.

== Purpose of cosmetic packaging ==
There are multiple reasons why care must be put into cosmetic containers. Not only must they protect the product, they need to provide conveniences for vendors and ultimately consumers.

The main purpose of a cosmetic container is to protect the product while it is in storage or being transported. The container must be a well thought out solution that protects the product from deterioration and helps preserve its quality. It must be an attractive looking container as part of the marketing of a beauty product.

The container must also contain labels that legibly display basic information about the product and the manufacturer. These labels include contact information, ingredients, expiration dates, warnings and instructions. Labels not only identify products and their origins, they help provide consumers with the facts that cannot be confusing or misleading.

Ideally, the container is made of durable material to give the product a long shelf life. It must last even longer through consumer use. The frequent opening and closing of the container can take a toll on its condition over time. Ultimately, the container must protect the product to the degree that it remains a safe product for human consumption. In other words, the container must shield the product from dirt, dust and germs.

The aesthetics of the container are considered extremely important since cosmetic products are mainly sold on brand image. Since cosmetic products are not considered medicine or survival products, the marketing of cosmetics depends heavily on associating brand awareness with emotion. The container must convey emotions about how the product will improve one's appearance and attitude. Many times cosmetics are repackaged and rebranded to help give them more market visibility.

=== Protection ===
The main purpose of a container is to store the product so that it is not degraded through storage, shipping and handling. Degradation and damage can be caused by various causes. These causes can be categorized into biological, chemical, thermal causes, damage caused by radiation and damage caused by human interaction, by electric sources or by pressure.

In addition to protecting the product, packaging also plays a big role marketing cosmetic products. While product quality is a major factor in the product's success, its packaging must be attractive since that's the essence of beauty marketing. Package design must capture the imagination and be associated with enhancing appearance. One of the keys to attractive packaging is the artistic use of colors. Most relevant for the marketer is the outer secondary packaging. However, there are cosmetics which are distributed in one single cosmetic container.

=== Creation of brand awareness ===
Cosmetic packages must not only convey beauty, they must equate to brand awareness. Since the package is what the consumer initially sees, it is very influential in shaping perceptions about the product. Part of building brand awareness for a cosmetic product is associating it with emotion. Since it is not a survival product it is marketed to appeal to the desire to enhance appearance. The packaging must stimulate this emotion.

=== Labelling ===
Labels tell consumers what they need to know about the product, as far as how to use it and where it comes from. Companies must list the ingredients and the function of the product, especially when it is unclear. The label must contain the contact information of the entity responsible for putting the product on the market. Labels also provide product tracking information.

The label must be easy to read, particularly for a customer where the product is being displayed. Certain compositions, such as perfumes, can be listed as one ingredient. Secondary packages are what the consumer sees as the outermost package. Primary packages are within the secondary package. Certain information can appear just on secondary packages. The most important information, particularly if the product is prone to misuse, must be displayed on both the primary and secondary packaging.

==== Information accuracy ====
One of the most important aspects of regulations on labeling is that the information is accurate. Although the FDA does not have the resources to inspect all cosmetic products on the market, it can issue penalties for various violations involving packaging and labeling. It is the manufacturer's responsibility to make sure that its product is safe for public consumption.

==== Avoidance of misleading information ====
None of the information, including name and address, may be misleading. Words can be abbreviated only if it is clear what they represent. All text must be printed clearly on the packaging. Smaller packages in which text is too difficult to read should include tags with legible text.

Ingredients must be listed in a certain order with priority given to ingredients that represent 1% or more of the volume. These ingredients must be listed in descending order, based on weight. This group of ingredients is then followed by those that represent 1% or less of the product and listed in any order. Colorants may also be listed in any order.

=== Packaging in multiple layers ===
Many times cosmetic products are packaged in multiple layers. Whenever it is difficult to detect for the consumer, the number of units should be listed on the outer package, which should contain details about how to use the product and warnings on what to do if it is misused. It is essential that the product is protected from environmental elements such as mould and bacteria.

The packaging must be sufficient to protect the mechanical, thermal, biological, and chemical properties of the product. It should also be strong enough to withstand human tampering and radiation damage.

== FDA and EU regulations ==
The FDA oversees cosmetic packaging but does not test products. It leaves testing for safety up to manufacturers. It still provides regulations and can issue recalls when a product is associated with safety hazards. While the FDA does not have many restrictions on ingredients for cosmetic products, it does require that certain chemicals and colorants be listed.

As far as EU regulations regarding packaging, manufacturers must be compliant with EC No. 1223/2009. One of these requirements involves the manufacturer issuing a safety report before putting the product on the market. The manufacturer must also disclose any serious undesirable effects (SUE) to the EU. Marketers are required to list nano-materials. The EU's definition of "ingredients" does not include raw or technical materials used in production that do not end up in the final product. In some cases when durability is an issue, the manufacturer must list an expiration date after the product has been opened. The words "best used before" are common for identifying the product expiration date.

== ISO-Standard ==
Standard ISO 22715 provides specifications for the packaging and labeling of all cosmetic products that are sold or distributed at no charge; i.e. free samples. National regulations dictate what products are to be regarded as cosmetics. While ISO 22715 is not legally binding, national regulations regarding cosmetic products can be even stricter than those laid out in ISO 22715. The link between standards and regulations is that a standard often represents the common denominator of national law, as the standardization committee consists of members of most countries.

== Standards and regulations ==
In addition to cosmetic containers meeting the requirements of ISO, they must also comply with regulations set by the European Union and the United States. Cosmetics products marketed in the EU must comply with the EU-Regulation (EC) No. 1223/2009 of the European Parliament and of the Council on cosmetic products. The entity that puts the product on the market, known as the "responsible person," must prepare a product safety report for the EU. Manufacturers must notify the EU Cosmetic Products Notification Portal (CPNP) when they plan on putting products on the market. Some of the main EU requirements include identifying colorants and nanomaterials and disclosing serious undesirable effects (SUE) to the EU.

The main issues to remember about labels on cosmetic containers is that they provide safety guidance, including instructions for use and proper disposal. In the United States, companies must comply with the Federal Food, Drug and Cosmetic Act. Although the FDA does exercise authority over the cosmetic industry, it does not allocate sufficient resources to constantly monitor the industry. ISO defines an ingredient as a material that makes up the final product and not necessarily raw materials used in the production of the product. While the FDA does not have strict requirements for ingredients, they must still be listed on the primary container or secondary package.

== Environmental aspects ==
The materials used for cosmetic containers are of concern for both protective and sustainable reasons. The container must protect the product from environmental elements and it must also move in the direction of eco-friendly solutions. In other words, the more the container can be recycled, the better for both the environment and cost efficiency. Some of the factors that affect container durability include how the product substance responds to usage, chemical composition and biology. It is essential that the container is able to withstand mold and mildew, as well as contaminants.

The container must be made of materials resistant to hot or cold temperatures. It must also protect the product from ultraviolet rays, which can potentially damage the product. The container also cannot absorb product substances. Traditionally, plastic material or glass have been used to house cosmetics. Aluminum has become a popular type of container due to its lightweight yet sturdy quality, flexibility, durability and recyclability. A key factor in what type of material can be used for containers is how compatible the material is with the product.

There is also a choice of eco-friendly boxes for cosmetic packaging. Companies also use custom cosmetic boxes for the packaging of their products. Plastic packaging materials are controversially discussed because of their polluting effects in particular to the marine environment. In 2014, a scientific study estimates the amount of floating plastics in the world's oceans to 5 trillion pieces with an accumulated weight of 250,000 tons.

== Examples ==
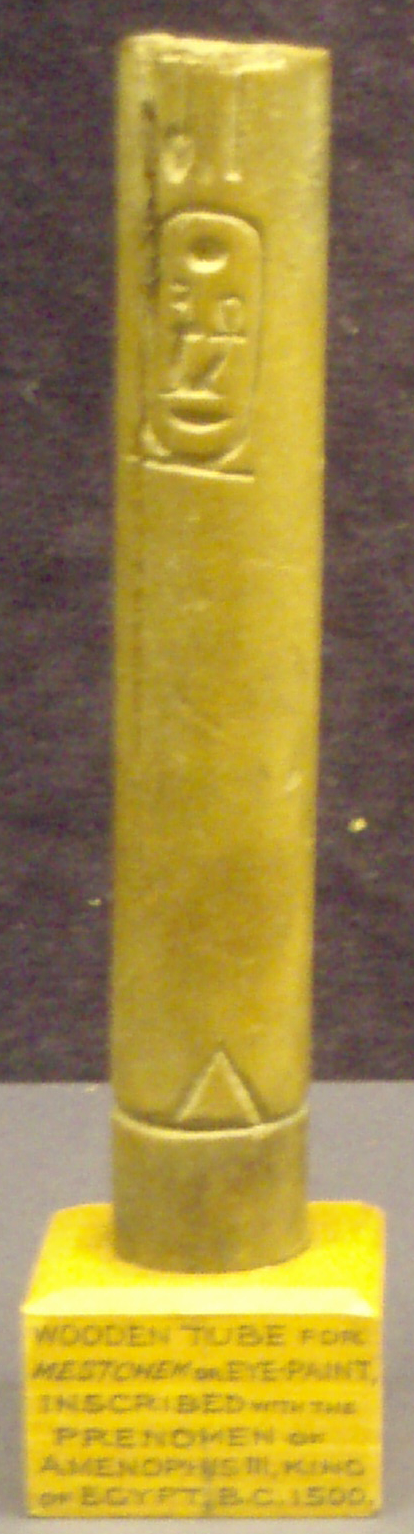
Kohl tube, Ancient Egypt with hieroglyph inscription

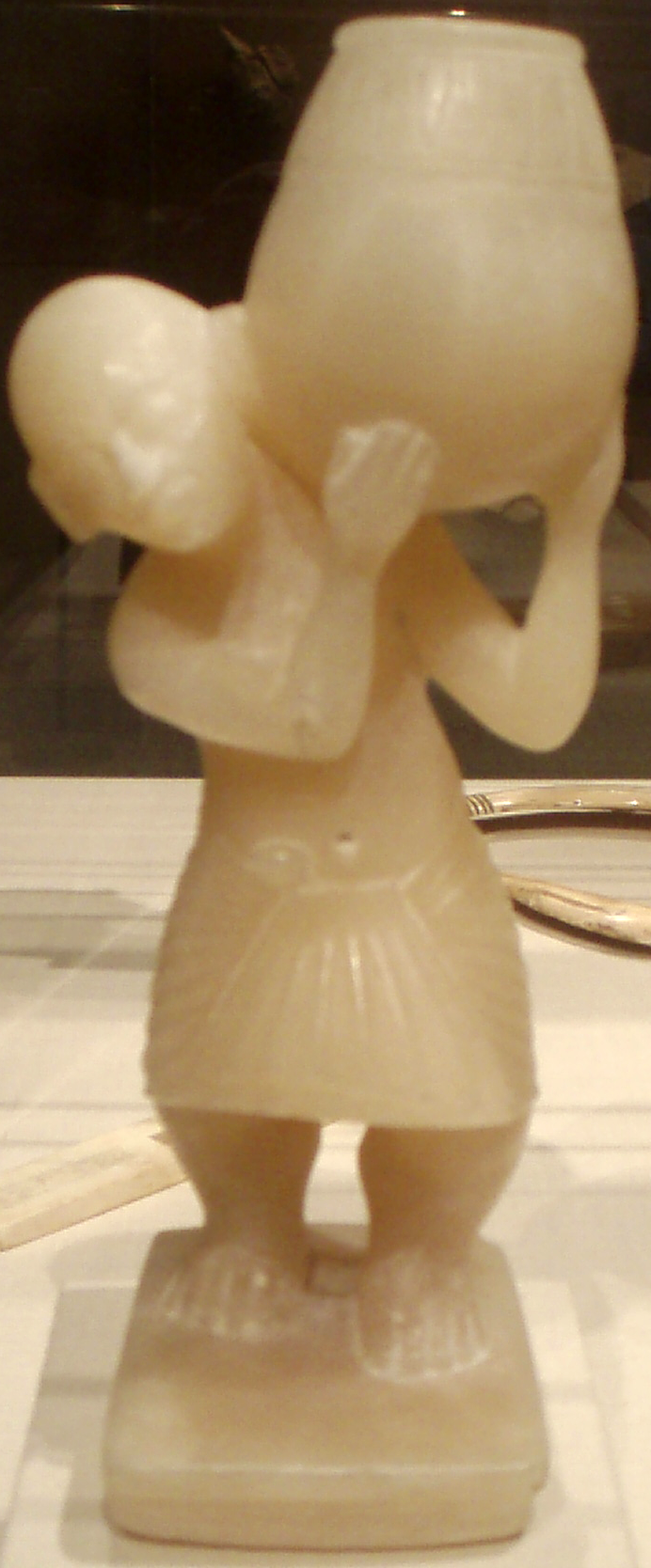
Egyptian kohl container & statuette

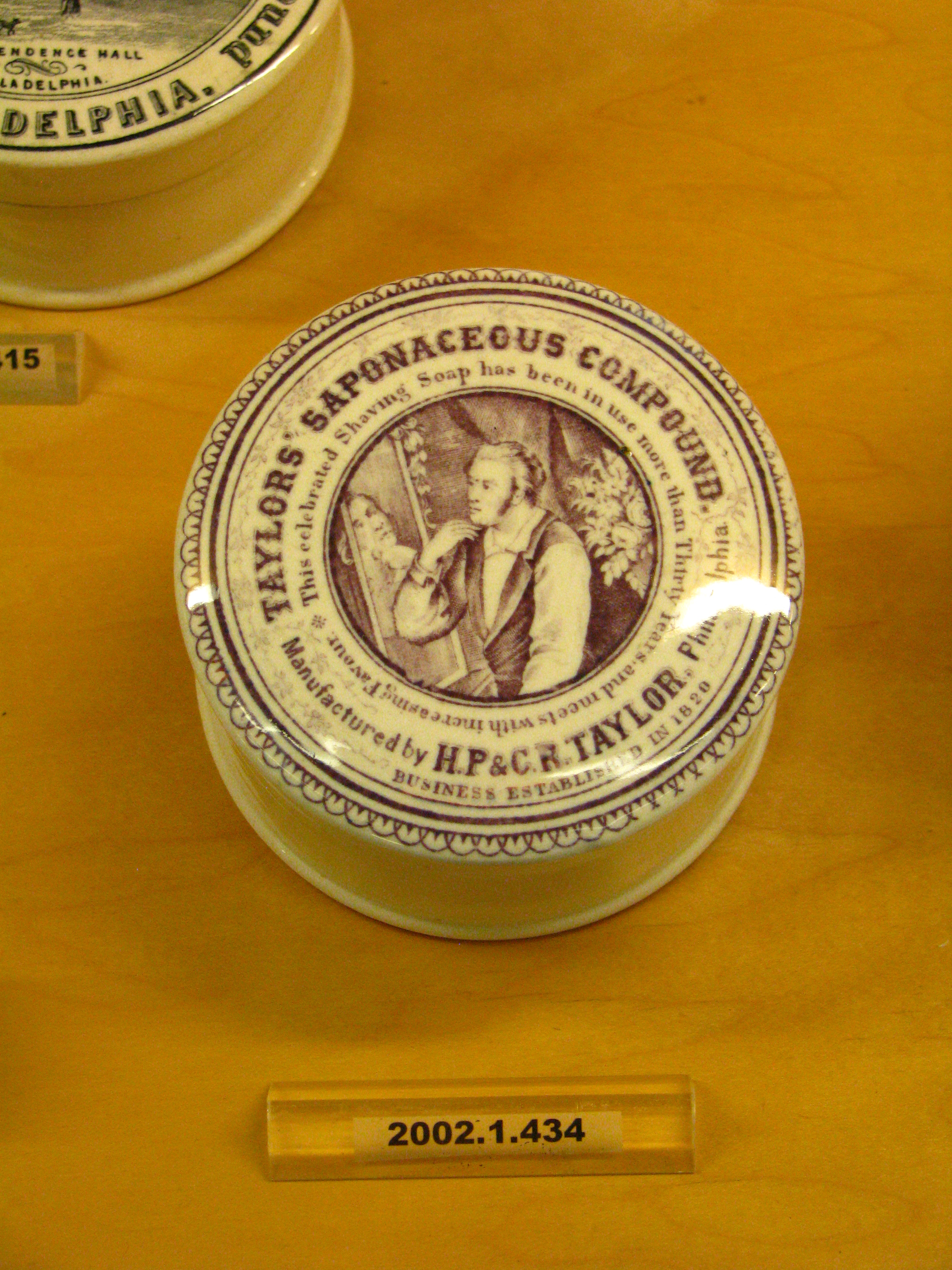
Recent historical round-type container, North America.

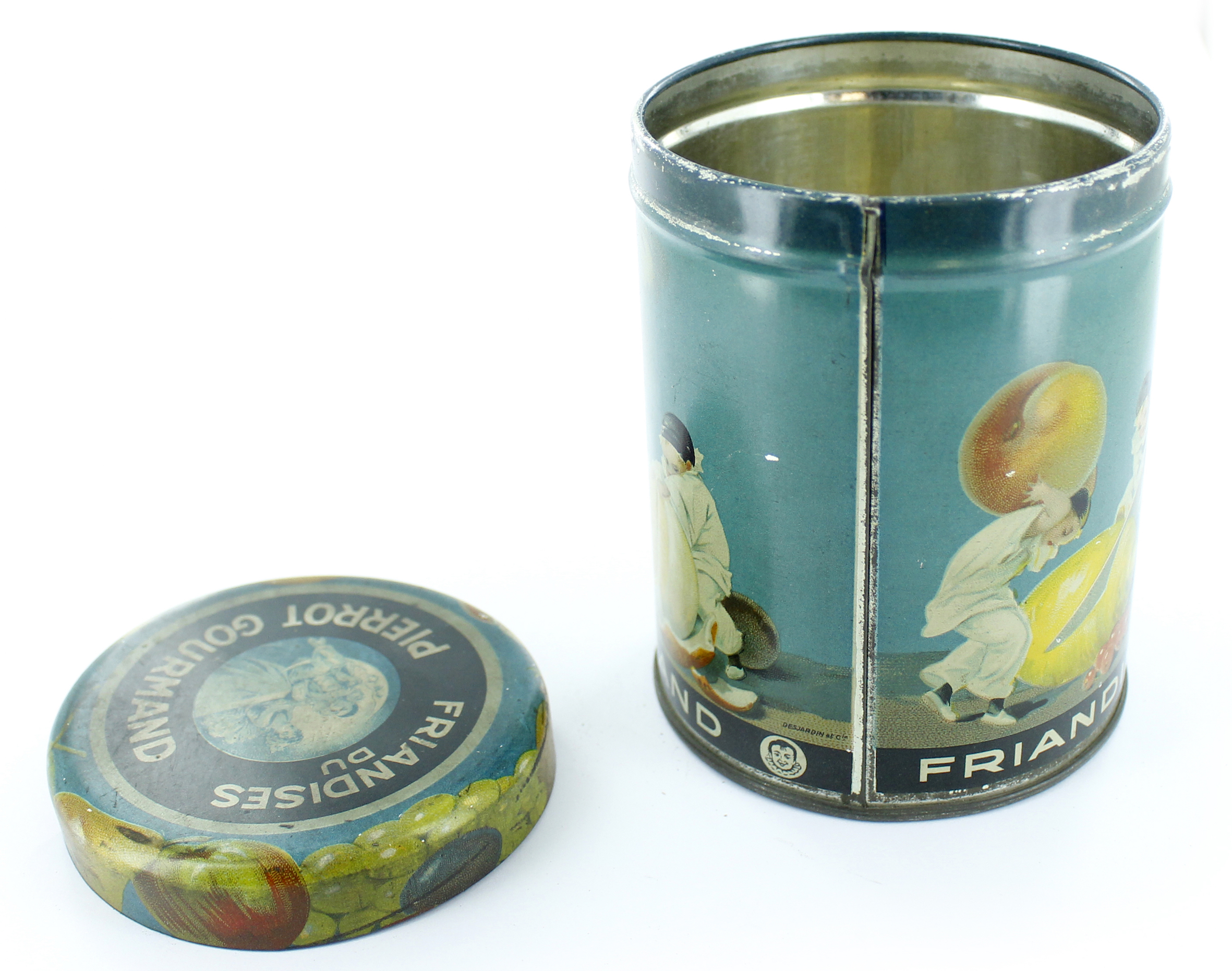
19th century tin by Desjardin Metal Packaging

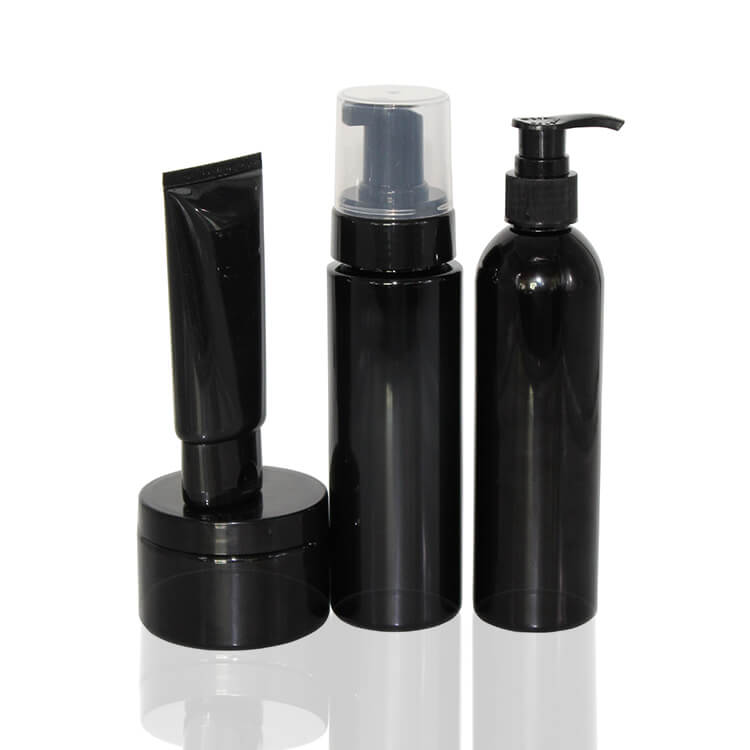
Plastic bottles and tubes
