= To the Manor Born =

British TV sitcom (1979–2007)

- Genre: Sitcom
- Created by: Peter Spence
- Directed by: Gareth Gwenlan
- Starring: Penelope Keith; Peter Bowles; Angela Thorne; John Rudling; Daphne Heard; Michael Bilton; Gerald Sim
- Theme music composer: Ronnie Hazlehurst
- Country of origin: United Kingdom
- Original language: English
- No. of series: 3
- No. of episodes: 20 + 2 specials (list of episodes)

Production
- Producers: Gareth Gwenlan; Justin Davies (2007)
- Running time: 30 minutes (1979–1981); 60 minutes (2007)

Original release
- Network: BBC1
- Release: 30 September 1979 – 25 December 2007

To the Manor Born is a BBC television sitcom that first aired on BBC1 from 1979 to 1981. A special one-off episode was produced in 2007. Starring Penelope Keith and Peter Bowles, the first 20 episodes and the 2007 special were written by Peter Spence, the creator, while the final episode in 1981 was written by script associate Christopher Bond. The title is a play on the phrase "to the manner born", from Shakespeare's Hamlet ("Though I am a native here and to the manner born, it is a custom more honoured in the breach than the observance".).

In To the Manor Born, Penelope Keith (who had previously been best known for her role as social-climber Margo Leadbetter in the suburban sitcom The Good Life), plays upper-class Audrey fforbes-Hamilton. Upon the death of her husband, Audrey is forced to sell her vast country estate, Grantleigh Manor. However, she then moves into the estate's small, modest lodge house (where she can keep an eye on the estate's new owner) and manages to keep her butler and her much loved Rolls-Royce 20/25 car. The manor is bought by Richard DeVere (played by Peter Bowles), a nouveau riche millionaire supermarket owner originally from Czechoslovakia. DeVere and fforbes-Hamilton have a love-hate relationship.

The programme proved popular and it received high audience figures for many of its episodes, especially the series 1 final episode, the most watched British television programme (excluding live events) of the 1970s. The theme tune for To the Manor Born was composed by Ronnie Hazlehurst, the BBC's Light Entertainment Music Director.

== Plot ==
=== Original series ===
To the Manor Born is set in the fictional village of Grantleigh in Somerset, near the fictional town of Marlbury. The series begins with the funeral of Marton (sic) fforbes-Hamilton, the Lord of the manor of Grantleigh. Audrey, his widow (and apparently also his cousin), is far from distraught, as she now has control of the Grantleigh Manor Estate, which her family, the fforbes-Hamiltons, have controlled for 400 years. Her joy is short-lived though, as her solicitor, Arnold Plunkett, informs her that Marton was bankrupt and that the manor will have to be sold to pay off the debts. Audrey tries to buy back the manor at auction, but is outbid at £876,000.

The new Lord of the manor is Richard DeVere, a recently widowed self-made millionaire who started his career on an East End fruit barrow and founded the Cavendish Foods supermarket chain, though Audrey calls him a costermonger and sees him simply as a grocer. DeVere brings his domineering mother, Maria Polouvicka (who is nicknamed by Audrey as 'Mrs. Poo'). She reveals to Audrey, who does not like foreigners, that she and her son came to Britain in 1939 from Czechoslovakia, and that Richard, whose real name is Bedřich Polouvicek, is half-Polish (on his late father Lazlo's side) and half-Czech. Mrs. Polouvicka tries hard to fit into British country life, but her accent often leads to many mispronunciations and she frequently comes out with sayings from her "old Czechoslovakia". From early on in the series, she encourages her son to court Audrey.

Audrey moves into the "Old Lodge", at the end of the drive, where she can see most of what goes on at the manor. Living with her is her elderly and loyal butler, Brabinger, who has worked for the fforbes-Hamiltons his whole life, and her beagle Bertie. Audrey's supportive best friend, and a frequent visitor, is the well-meaning Marjory Frobisher, who quickly develops a crush on DeVere. Marjory, who was at school with Audrey, is still a schoolgirl at heart and a committed countryside campaigner. Marjory has no organisational ability, which leads to her being nicknamed "Muddlesome Marj" by some. Despite Marjory's encouragement, Audrey refuses to get a job, saying her only job could be running the Grantleigh Estate and doing other public service, which includes her being a magistrate. This means that money is a constant problem and Audrey has to learn to live within her means and new circumstances. During the second series, Brabinger is away ill; and Ned, whose tied cottage is being renovated by Richard, takes over as Audrey's butler. Ned, a gardener and "outside man", has worked on the estate all his life and finds working indoors difficult to get used to and he tends to lack the refined characteristics that a trained butler such as Brabinger possessed. Other estate staff include the estate foreman Mr. Miller, the new estate manager Mr. Spalding and the cook Mrs. Beecham. Another character, Polly, originally works at the local "Cavendish Foods" supermarket and then at the doctors' surgery, while Linda Cartwright works in the stables and as a domestic. The postman, Mr. Purvis, appears in two episodes.

Other characters include the local rector, who is not unhappy when Audrey loses the manor, hoping that it will prevent the dominating Audrey from having a say in the running of the church and local causes. The rector favours Richard, who is frequently generous when it comes to donations to church funds. The village shop is run by Mrs. Patterson, the local gossip who also favours Richard and does not get on with Audrey. The typically English Brigadier Lemington, of the Somerset Rifles and a former Desert Rat, is another local landowner and friend of Audrey's and the Master of Foxhounds and, like Audrey and Marjory, has an interest in nature conservation and cricket. Arnold Plunkett and his wife Dorothy are friends of Audrey, while Arnold is also the family solicitor. Grantleigh's local estate agent is J.J. Anderson, of Anderson and Fish, who appears at manor parties.

During the course of the three series, Audrey and Richard grow closer. Hostile to each other at the start, they grew to understand and respect each other, as both try to adapt to each other's ways. The last two 1981 episodes show Richard having problems at his company Cavendish Foods. With his board of directors refusing to let Richard buy a refrigeration plant in Argentina, he seriously considers selling the manor to raise the money to buy the plant himself. Trying to help Richard, Audrey asks her uncle, a well-respected and connected member of the financial community, to lend Richard a hand. Thanks to him, things begin to go Richard's way. Unfortunately, Audrey's uncle dies before the deals are signed. Richard decides to sell the manor to pay for the refrigerated plant. By a twist of fate, Audrey inherits her uncle's fortune and buys the manor back with Brabinger placing the winning bid of £990,000 on her behalf. Now back home and on her own turf, Audrey asks Richard to marry her. Taken aback, Richard says yes and they are married in the final episode, broadcast on 29 November 1981.

=== 2007 Christmas special ===
As Richard and Audrey plan to celebrate their silver wedding anniversary, each planning a surprise party for the other, Richard confesses to Audrey that he owns Farmer Tom, a company that has been putting the neighbouring estates out of business. Audrey leaves him and goes to stay with Marjory, much to the latter's displeasure. Richard visits his mother's grave to develop a plan to win Audrey back. He decides to allow a rock concert to be held on the estate. When the licence application is up before the magistrates' court, Richard changes his mind. The following day, their anniversary, Marjory leads Audrey to a surprise party organised by Richard.

New characters in the 2007 Christmas special include Emmeridge, the outspoken butler replacing Brabinger; Adam fforbes-Hamilton, Marton's nephew and Audrey's godson, who has recently moved to Grantleigh to learn how to run an estate; and Archie Pennington-Booth, a neighbouring landowner driven to bankruptcy by Farmer Tom. Marjory now lives in the Old Lodge that Audrey occupied during the original series, and she and Adam develop a romantic interest in each other. A small acknowledgement of Bertie and Brabinger appears in the special, consisting of a photo of Brabinger and a small beagle statuette on a side table. Richard's mother, "Mrs. Poo", is acknowledged by a marble headstone in the church graveyard and a framed photograph on the mantel of the manor's sitting room.

== Cast ==
The cast is led by Penelope Keith as Audrey fforbes-Hamilton and Peter Bowles as Richard de Vere. The other main cast members in the original series are Angela Thorne (playing Audrey's old friend Marjory), Daphne Heard (Richard's mother, Mrs. Polouvicka), John Rudling (Brabinger the butler), Michael Bilton (Ned, the odd-job man) and Gerald Sim (the Rector). Rudling was absent in the 1979 Christmas special and for much of the second series due to his ill health; his character was temporarily replaced as butler by Ned. Rudling died in 1983. Angela Thorne had worked with Keith before when she had played Lady "George" Truscott in a 1977 episode of The Good Life.

Peter Bowles had been asked some years earlier to play Jerry Leadbetter, the husband of Keith's Margo, in The Good Life. Owing to prior commitments, Bowles turned down the role, but had he played Jerry, it is unlikely he would have been offered the part of Richard; as Bowles later said, "There's no way I could have played Penelope Keith's screen husband in two separate sitcoms." However, in 1987 Bowles replaced Geoffrey Palmer as Keith's onscreen husband in the ITV sitcom Executive Stress.

The series also features many recurring characters, who are either estate workers or members of Audrey's social circle. Celia Imrie, who makes two appearances as the receptionist in the Surgery and then a cashier Polly, later became known for her work with Victoria Wood, including the sitcom Dinnerladies, as well as roles in Kingdom and After You've Gone.

The 2007 Christmas special features four of the original cast members: Penelope Keith, Peter Bowles, Angela Thorne, and Gerald Sim as the Rector. New characters include Alexander Armstrong as Adam fforbes-Hamilton, Audrey's nephew-by-marriage and godson; Alan David as Emmeridge, Audrey and Richard's outspoken butler; and Michael Cochrane as Archie Pennington-Booth, a neighbouring landowner. While the Rector makes only a brief appearance, the other three original characters are main characters throughout and are credited in the opening credits.

Regular characters in the original series
| Actor | Character |
|---|---|
| Penelope Keith | Audrey fforbes-Hamilton |
| Peter Bowles | Bedřich "Richard DeVere" Polouvicek |
| Angela Thorne | Marjory Frobisher |
| Daphne Heard | Maria Polouvicka |
| John Rudling | Brabinger (the Butler) |
| Michael Bilton | Old Ned |
| Gerald Sim | The Rector |
| Daphne Oxenford | Mrs Patterson |

Recurring characters in the original series
| Actor | Character |
|---|---|
| Jonathan Elsom | J.J. Anderson |
| Dennis Ramsden | Arnold Plunkett |
| Betty Tucker | Mrs Beecham |
| Jayne Lester | Linda Cartwright |
| Nicholas McArdle | Miller |
| Joyce Windsor | Mrs Dorothy Plunkett |
| Anthony Sharp | Brigadier Lemington, OBE |
| John Gleeson | Mr Purvis |
| Ben Aris | Mr Spalding |

Characters in the 2007 Christmas special
| Actor | Character |
|---|---|
| Penelope Keith | Audrey DeVere |
| Peter Bowles | Bedřich "Richard DeVere" Polouvicek |
| Angela Thorne | Marjory Frobisher |
| Gerald Sim | The Rector |
| Alexander Armstrong | Adam fforbes-Hamilton |
| Alan David | Emmeridge |
| Michael Cochrane | Archie Pennington-Booth |

== Production ==
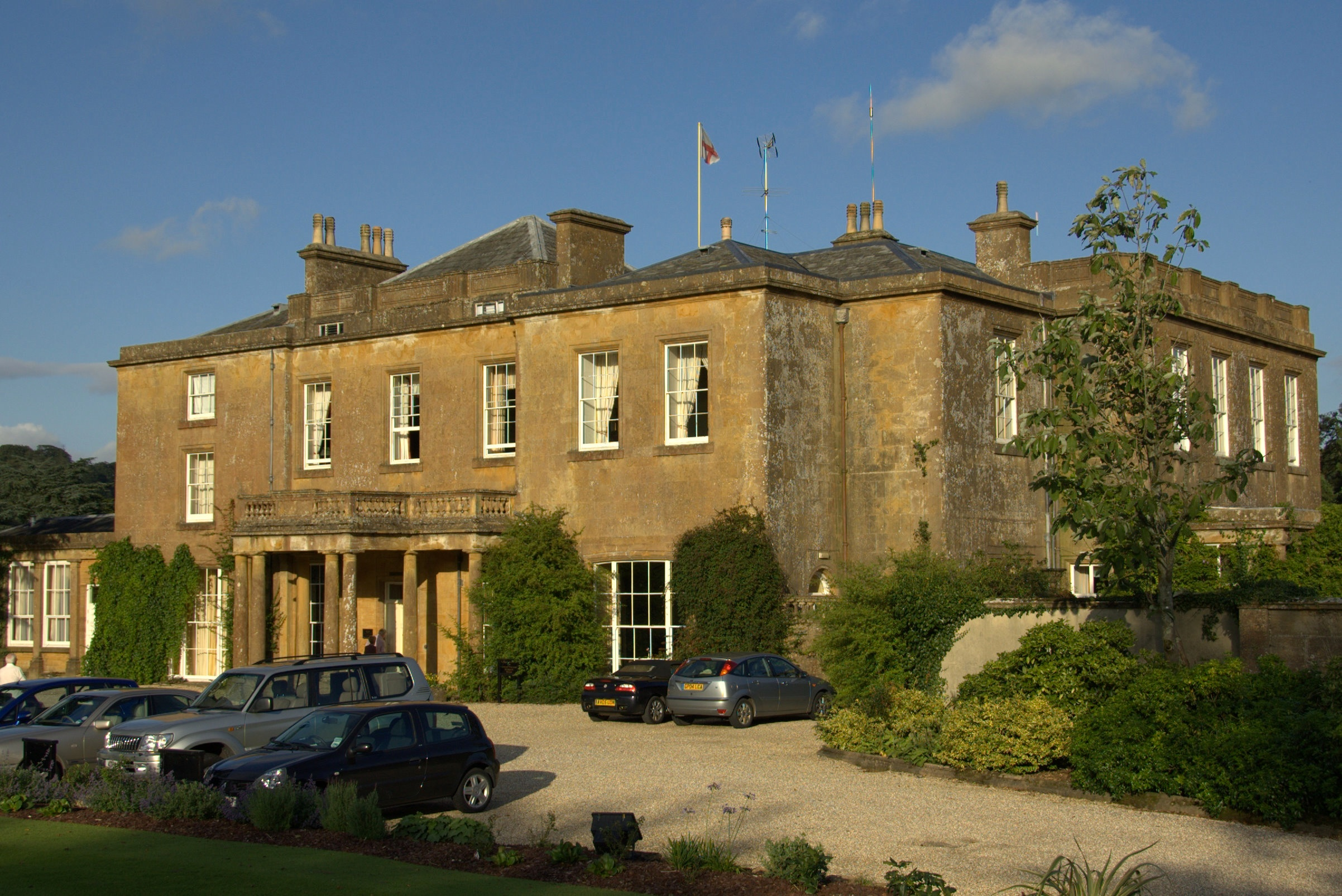
Cricket House in Cricket St Thomas, Somerset, used as the location for Grantleigh Manor

=== Development ===
Peter Spence first thought of the idea behind To the Manor Born in the early 1970s when he was working for BBC Radio as a gag writer. One of the programmes that Spence wrote for featured a Cockney comedian, who had recently bought a manor house in an English country village. When holding a housewarming party, the comedian invited the previous occupant, a widow who could not afford to keep the house up and had moved to a smaller house in the village. The comedian's account of the lady, and the conversation he had with her, Spence later described as a "perfect description" of Audrey.

A few years later, following the success of The Good Life, Spence was asked by BBC Radio to come up with an idea for a programme to feature Keith. Thinking of Keith's character in The Good Life, Spence had the idea of inverting the character of Margo Leadbetter (who was middle class but trying desperately to climb the social ladder), thus creating a character who genuinely was from an aristocratic, upper-class background, but had lost her fortune and was forced into a more humble existence and, from the account from the comedian, came up with Audrey fforbes-Hamilton. Instead of a Cockney comedian as the new owner of the manor, Spence decided on an American who sees the manor while in England looking for his roots. The American later discovers he is descended from the fforbes-Hamiltons. This was made into a radio pilot in 1976 with Bernard Braden as the American, but was never broadcast because of the interest to make it into a TV series.

When writing the TV series, Christopher Bond was brought in as the script associate and helped to adapt the series from radio to television. The American character was changed, and the idea of a character who appeared to be an English gentleman, but turns out not to be, was thought of. It was then decided that this character needed someone who could reveal his real background, and his mother was created, although it was not until Spence had nearly finished the first series that she was written in from the beginning. The characters of Brabinger and Marjory followed soon after. The first episode aired on 30 September 1979, a year after Keith had played Margo Leadbetter for the last time in The Good Life. The character of Richard de Vere, and his fictional company Cavendish Foods were reportedly a thinly veiled dig at businessman Sir James Goldsmith and his company Cavenham Foods.

=== Filming ===
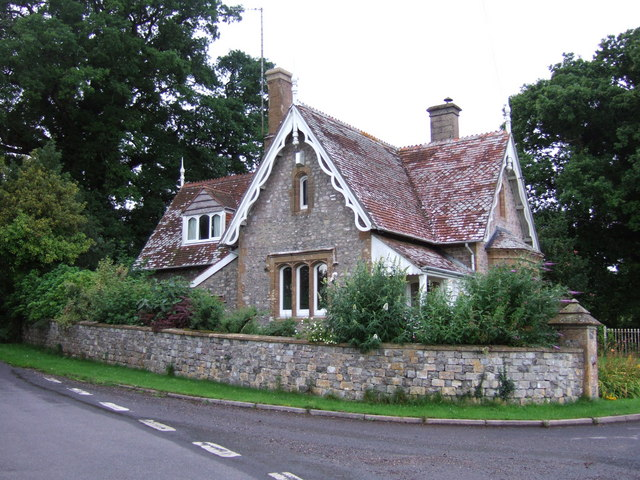
Cricket St Thomas West Lodge

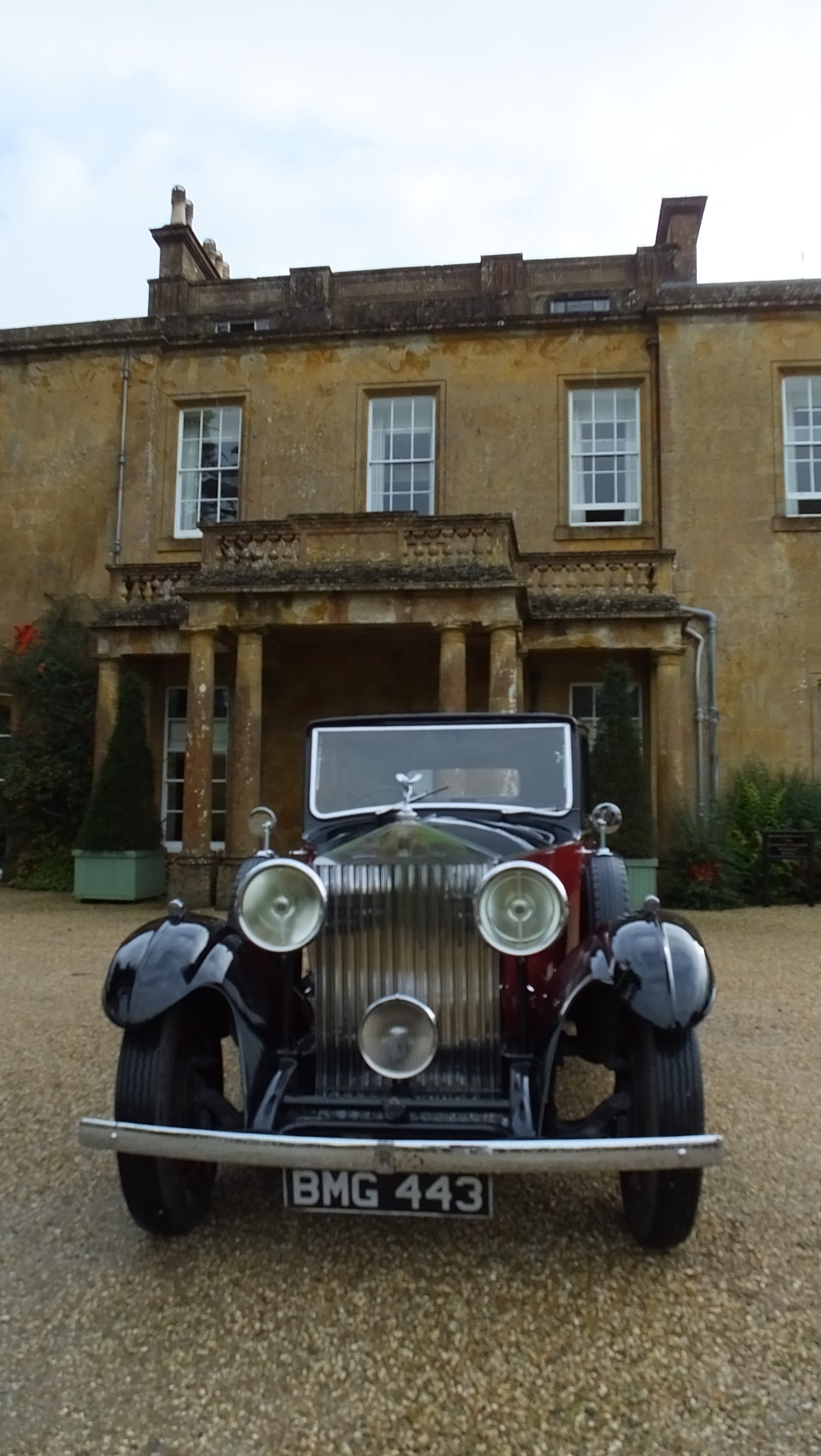
Rolls-Royce 20/25 BMG 443 featured in the series. pictured in front of Cricket House

To the Manor Born was filmed on location in Cricket St Thomas, Somerset, and in Studio TC1 at the BBC's Television Centre in Shepherd's Bush, London. The manor, Cricket House, was at the time of the original series owned by the father-in-law of Peter Spence, the show's creator and writer. Some interior scenes were also filmed inside Cricket House. The Old Lodge, which on screen was at the end of the manor's drive, is in fact about one mile away and called West Lodge. A false gatepost was installed to help the illusion that the two are close together. The 2007 special was, like the original series, filmed on location in Cricket St Thomas. This filming took place for about a week starting on 28 October 2007. The studio footage was filmed in front of a live audience at Pinewood Studios in Buckinghamshire on 25 November 2007.

All the episodes were directed by Gareth Gwenlan, who also produced the original series. The 2007 special was co-produced by Gwenlan and Justin Davies.

During the filming, many cars were used; but the BBC continued to use the same vintage Rolls-Royce through the entire series, including the opening titles for the show. The Rolls-Royce (BMG443) has also been used in other BBC programmes such as Dad's Army.

== Broadcast history ==
To the Manor Born ran for three series from 30 September 1979 to 29 November 1981. Each episode is half an hour long. The first series aired for seven episodes on Sundays at 8.45 pm, the second series for six episodes on Sundays at 8.35 pm and the seven-episode Series Three on Sundays at 7.15 pm. A Christmas special special aired at 8.00 pm. All episodes aired on BBC1. A second Christmas special, announced on 24 October 2007, aired at 9.30 pm on BBC One on Christmas Day, 25 December 2007.

== Reception ==
The programme was very popular with viewers. Several episodes received extremely high audience figures, especially the first series. This was partly due to the fact that ITV, the main rival channel to BBC1 in the United Kingdom, was in the middle of a protracted strike which started in early August 1979. This saw nearly all of the local ITV companies go off air, with no programmes being aired from the network (except Channel Television in the Channel Islands), leaving only BBC 1 and BBC 2 as the channels left for the British public to watch until Wednesday 24 October 1979, when ITV returned to air, with the strike ending in a pay agreement. However, many viewers remained with the BBC and with shows such as To the Manor Born, as ITV took some months to get going again with new programmes. For the first month after the strike had ended, ITV found it hard to win back viewers who preferred to remain with the BBC, as ITV was airing repeats and filler programmes until new content was made from November 1979. This gave To the Manor Born a huge advantage with the viewing public.

In 1979, the last episode of the first series received 23.95 million viewers, the fourth-highest figures for any programme in the UK in the 1970s, and the highest for a non-live event. The following year, 21.55 million people watched the last episode of series two, the fifth-highest viewing figure for the 1980s. The final episode in 1981 received 17.80 million viewers. The 2007 Christmas special garnered 10.25 million viewers and ranked as the 6th most watched programme in the UK for that week.

=== 2007 special ===
Writing in the Sunday Express on 30 December 2007, Marshall Julius described the 2007 Anniversary special as "so cosy and old-fashioned that I could easily have dismissed it with a cynical wave". However, he says he found himself enjoying it "about halfway through" and said "it was a real pleasure to see Peter Bowles and Penelope Keith, for both of whom I feel great affection, once again sparring on the small screen". Julius finished his review by commenting "Not that I'm saying I'd like a whole series of it but as a one-off event it was surprisingly welcome".

The British Comedy Guide was more critical saying that "whilst it gained great viewing figures it really wasn't a patch on the original episodes".

== In other media ==
=== Novelisations ===
The writer Peter Spence wrote two books that accompanied To the Manor Born. While they were based on the TV episodes, both books did differ with added conversations, changed storylines and the characters being given different personality traits. The first book, published in 1979 by Arrow Books, is entitled To the Manor Born and is based on the first series episodes 1, 2, 4, 6 and 7. In this book, Brabinger's first name, which is never mentioned in the TV series, is revealed as Bertram and Ned's surname revealed as Peaslake. The second book, titled To the Manor Born Book 2, was published by the same publisher in 1980. This is a novelisation of the 1979 Christmas special and episodes 5, 4, 3, 2 and 6 from the second series, plus an original story.

=== Film version ===
A film version was announced by the Rank Organisation at the Cannes Film Festival in 1980, but then was abandoned when Rank pulled out of filmmaking.

=== Radio version ===
In 1997, 16 years after the original series of To the Manor Born ended on television, ten 30-minute episodes were recorded for radio, the programme's original intended medium. The episodes, originally aired on Saturdays on BBC Radio 2 from 25 January to 29 March 1997, were written by Peter Spence, six adapted from TV episodes and four new episodes. Keith and Thorne returned as Audrey and Marjory, while Keith Barron replaced Bowles as Richard. Other actors, including Frank Middlemass and Nicholas McArdle, who played Miller in the TV version, replaced many of the by then deceased original television cast members. The series has subsequently been repeated on BBC 7/BBC Radio 4 Extra. All ten episodes, collected, are now available for purchase on Audible and iTunes.

==== Radio cast ====
| Actor | Character/s |
|---|---|
| Penelope Keith | Audrey fforbes-Hamilton |
| Keith Barron | Richard DeVere |
| Angela Thorne | Marjory Frobisher |
| Margery Withers | Mrs Maria Polouvicka |
| Nicholas McArdle | Brabinger |
| Frank Middlemass | Ned/Arnold Plunkett |
| Zulema Dene | Mrs Plunkett |
| Jonathan Adams | Brigadier Lemington, OBE |

==== Radio episodes ====
| No. | Title | Original release date |
|---|---|---|
| 1 | "Rhythms of the Earth" | 25 January 1997 |
Audrey is unhappy that Richard has not attended the Sunday church service, and goes to the Manor to tell him of his duties as Lord of the manor, which include reading the lesson. He promises to attend church the following Sunday and read one lesson, while she will read the other. However, she fails to turn up because the clocks have gone forward.
| 2 | "The Grapevine" | 1 February 1997 |
At a party at the Manor, Audrey tells Richard that she is going on holiday to Spain. However, she actually spends her holiday hiding at the Lodge. During her "holiday" she finds out that Richard and Marjory have been spending time in the woods behind the Lodge. Unknown to her, they are badger watching but when Audrey confronts him at a post-holiday party, he tells her he knows where she spent her holiday.
| 3 | "What's in a Name" | 8 February 1997 |
Audrey is having problems with her heating, and Old Ned is trying to fix it but keeps needing new parts. Meanwhile, Mrs. Poo is bored and enters a "Cavendish Foods" competition, and upon Richard's insistence does so under an assumed name. She wins the competition, to Audrey's good fortune. (New episode)
| 4 | "Vive Le Sport" | 15 February 1997 |
Audrey believes she is the only healthy person on the estate, but then hurts her back and gets little help from Dr. Horton (Geoffrey Whitehead). Audrey enjoys Richard coming round to see her, and pretends her back is worse than it is to ensure the visits continue. However, when he asks her to go skiing with him, she makes a quick recovery only for Richard to break his leg while practising skiing.
| 5 | "Sons of the Fathers" | 22 February 1997 |
Audrey, a local magistrate, encourages Richard to join the Marlbury bench as they are short of magistrates. Richard meanwhile tries to persuade her to go to the race course with him. However, she refuses as she wants to spend time looking for any close relatives as she is worried about being the last of the fforbes-Hamilton line. (New episode)
| 6 | "A Wife's Prerogative" | 1 March 1997 |
When Richard gets in a difficult situation with a female business associate Mlle Dutoit (Rula Lenska), he tells her he is married. However, Mlle Dutoit then arranges to visit the Manor, and Richard persuades Audrey to pretend to be his wife for the weekend. Audrey uses the situation to move a piece of modern art she dislikes. The deception goes well until Mrs. Poo returns home early from London.
| 7 | "The Spare Room" | 8 March 1997 |
An old friend of Audrey and Marjory, Podge Hodge (Zulema Dene), comes to visit, Audrey has to ask Richard to provide a bedroom as the Lodge has a leaking roof. Podge and Richard soon start getting on well, to Audrey and Marjory's horror, and when they spend the whole day together after going hunting, Audrey and Marjory ensure Podge does not spend a second night at the Manor.
| 8 | "An Englishman's Home" | 15 March 1997 |
Richard has a security system installed at the Manor and Audrey is concerned that the CCTV will allow Richard to see into her bedroom. Meanwhile, the estate workers go on strike, fearing they are being watched, and Mrs. Poo has problems with the system, causing the Police to be called to the Manor frequently. (New episode)
| 9 | "The Honours List" | 22 March 1997 |
Audrey lectures Richard for not attending Lord Allenshaw's (Frank Middlemass) lecture on nature conservation. She then attacks him for his proposed destruction of the estate's hedgerows. However, when Audrey hears that a local person is to receive an honour, she believes it will be Richard, and she changes her mind and agrees to host his New Year party. However, it is the Brigadier who gets an honour, being made an OBE.
| 10 | "Plenty More Fish" | 29 March 1997 |
Audrey and Marjory fall out when Audrey develops a close friendship with Commander Jeremy French-Liversey (Doyne Byrd) and does not help organise the county show. Richard gets jealous, and he finds out the Commander has a "roving eye" for women. Meanwhile, Mrs. Poo and Ned get stuck on a runaway traction engine. (New episode)

== Home media ==
All three series, including the 1979 and 2007 Christmas specials, of To the Manor Born have been released in the UK (Region 2). The first series and the 1979 Christmas special were released on 5 May 2003, followed by Series Two on 29 December 2003 and Series Three on 14 June 2004. The DVDs feature an interview with Peter Spence. The 2007 Christmas special was released on Region 2 DVD on 11 February 2008.

The complete original series was released in a boxset in the United States and Canada (Region 1) on 15 June 2004.

All ten of the radio shows were released in collected form via iTunes in 2020.

In Australia (Region 4), all three seasons and a complete series boxset have been released. Also the 25th Wedding Anniversary Special.

| DVD title | Region 2 | Region 4 |
|---|---|---|
| The Complete Series One | 5 May 2003 (including first special) | 3 May 2004 |
| The Complete Series Two | 29 December 2003 | 7 April 2005 |
| The Complete Series Three | 14 June 2004 | 4 May 2006 |
| The Complete Series 1–3 | | 5 October 2006 |
| 25th Wedding Anniversary Special | 11 February 2008 | 2 April 2009 |
| The Complete Collection (Series 1–3 + 25th Wedding Anniversary) | | 30 September 2014 |
