= ISO 22715 =

Standard for cosmetics

The ISO 22715 standard Cosmetics — Packaging and labelling provides guidelines for manufacturers in the best practices for cosmetic packaging and labelling of all cosmetic products. This standard applies to products that fall under the category of cosmetics that are sold or given away as free samples. ISO 22715 was initially published in April 2006.

== Description ==
The intent of Standard ISO 22715 is to specify how cosmetic products should be packaged and labeled to maintain a certain level of standards within the cosmetic industry. This standard applies to cosmetic products whether the product is sold or given away. It is one of 26 published standards that are devoted to the cosmetic industry sector.

ISO 22715 does not regulate what products are to be considered cosmetic. This determination is left to the national regulations of those countries that follow the ISO 22715 and use it as a guide to best practices for packaging and labeling cosmetic products. Often, these national regulations are stricter than those provided in the standard.

== Labeling specifications ==
ISO 22715 supports the need for consumers to know what is in the cosmetic products they purchase, how those products should be used and who has manufactured the products. To accomplish this, 22715 specifies that a product's packaging should show certain information such as the ingredients used in the product listed in descending order according to the percentage of each ingredient in the product. A list of coloring agents used in the product then follows the list of ingredients.

For safety purposes, ISO recommends including an explanation of what the product function is on the package, along with instructions for its use. Any precautionary or warning statements should also be printed on the package to caution consumers in the use of said product. Additional information that should appear on the packaging of cosmetic products includes:

- Manufacturer's name and address
- Date of manufacture or batch number that can be used to identify the product
- Product's weight or volume at the time it was packaged
- Recommendations for storage of the product
- ISO 22715 provides guidelines to be followed in how that information should appear on the packaging. If applicable, requirements are provided for primary and secondary packaging.

== Relevance of ISO standards ==
The International Organization for Standardization (ISO) was formed in 1947. It is a non-governmental organization (NGO) that is based in Geneva, Switzerland. The ISO has 162 members and the organization represents the interest of international standards of 196 countries. This represents almost 97 percent of the world's population.

The ISO's purpose is to create standards that are used to help form public policies and business objectives that benefit people throughout the world. Since May 2016, there has been over 21,500 ISO standards published. The ISO develops new standards when industry sectors and their stakeholders determine that a need exists. The standards are developed under the oversight of the ISO through cooperative efforts between other NGOs, consumer organizations, representatives from government agencies, academics and testing laboratories.

== Legal relevance of ISO 22715 ==
ISO 22715 is not legally binding, but it is the common denominator used for developing national regulations that address the labeling and packaging of cosmetic products. Regulators in individual countries often look to ISO standards as the benchmark for best practices for the different industry sectors in which they apply. Many regulators require businesses and manufacturers to comply with applicable ISO standards, in addition to local regulations.

Currently, there are 26 published ISO standards devoted to the cosmetic sector, including ISO 22715. These standards are overseen by the ISO's cosmetic product technical committee that was established in 1998. This committee is composed of standardization bodies from major markets, such as leading ASEAN countries, most European countries and the United States via ANSI. Thirty-nine countries participate in the creation of standards for cosmetic products, with 27 observing countries within the committee.

To better distribute and update standards as needed, the ISO maintains the copyright on its standards. Most standards are reviewed and updated every five to seven years to remain relevant to the latest technologies within industry sectors.

== ISO 22715 and local regulations ==
Often, local regulations may exceed the requirements specified in ISO 22715. In the United States, the Food & Drug Administration (FDA) regulates the cosmetic industry with standards that are provided by the American National Standards Institute (ANSI), in which the FDA is member.

In the European Union, cosmetic manufacturers must abide by Regulation (EC) No. 1223/2009 Article 19 for the labeling of cosmetic products.

== History ==
Year	Description
2006	ISO 22715 (1st Edition)
