= Peter Penry-Jones =

Welsh actor (1938–2009)

Peter David Penry-Jones (20 May 1938 – 11 March 2009) was a British actor. He was born in Cardiff and died in Anglesey.

== Career ==
Penry-Jones's television credits include: Colditz, The Professionals, To the Manor Born ("Connections in High Places"), Bergerac, Howards' Way, Kavanagh QC and Midsomer Murders ("The Electric Vendetta"). He worked with Laurence Olivier at the National Theatre.

== Personal life ==
The son of the Rev. David Penry-Jones, a Presbyterian minister in South Wales, in September 1967 in Westminster Penry-Jones married actress Angela Thorne, and they had two sons, actors Laurence and Rupert.

Penry-Jones died of bowel cancer in 2009, aged 70, in Anglesey.

== Filmography and television ==
- 1969 - Dance of Death - Lieutenant - Film
- 1972 - Love Story - Martin - TV Series, Episode: Third Party
- 1972-1973 - Colditz - P.O. Peter Muir - TV Series (10 episodes)
- 1973 - Hunter's Walk - Doctor - TV Series, Episode: Disturbance
- 1973 - Nobody is Norman Wisdom - Morse - TV Series
- 1974 - General Hospital - Tony Wainwright - TV Series
- 1974 - Happy Ever After - Under Manager - TV Series, Episode: The Hotel
- 1974 - Father Brown - John Godfrey - TV Series, Episode: The Curse of the Golden Cross
- 1974 - Jennie: Lady Randolph Churchill - Francis Knollys - TV Mini-Series, Episode: Jennie Jerome
- 1975 - Edward the Seventh - Augustus Paget - TV Mini Series, Episode: Alix
- 1976 - Victorian Scandals - Lord Hubert de Burgh - TV Series, Episode: Skittles
- 1977 - The Professionals - Cummings - TV Series, Episode: Private Madness, Public Danger
- 1979 - Dick Barton: Special Agent - Scientist - TV Series
- 1981 - To the Manor Born - Gayforth - TV Series, Episodes: Back to the Manor, Connections in High Places
- 1982 - Solo - Mr. Baines - TV Series
- 1983 - Live from Pebble Mill - Father - TV Series, Episode: Night Kids
- 1984 - Bergerac - Doctor - TV Series, Episode: A Cry in the Night
- 1986 - Screen Two - Anthony Evans - TV Series, Episode: The Silent Twins
- 1986 - Dramarama - Bray - TV Series, Episode: Just a Game
- 1987 - Born of Fire - The Manager
- 1986-1987 - Strike it Rich! - Mark Ashe/Dr. Hewlett - TV Series
- 1987 - Superman IV: The Quest for Peace - Episode: Tourist at Great Wall of China #2
- 1985-1987 - Howard's Way - Colin Linsdale - TV Series, 10 episodes
- 1988 - Double First - Peter - TV Series, 2 episodes
- 1988-1990 - The Ruth Rendell Mysteries - Solicitor/Mr. Browning - TV Series
- 1991 - Van der Valk - Markheim - TV Series, Episode: A Sudden Silence
- 1992 - Agatha Christie's Poirot - Superintendent Carter - TV Series, Episode: The ABC Murders
- 1992 - The Good Guys - Oliver Thornton - TV Series, Episode: Verschwinden
- 1993 - Genghis Cohn - Dr. Brauner
- 1995 - Bliss - Jeffrey Snowden - TV Movie
- 1996 - The Legacy of Reginald Perrin - Tim Ripley - TV Series
- 1996 - The Fragile Heart - Surgeon - TV Series, 3 episodes
- 2000 - Longitude - Surgeon - TV Movie
- 2001 - Kavanagh QC - Andrew Cardigan QC - TV Series, Episodes: The End of Law
- 2001 - Midsomer Murders - Peter, Marquis of Ross, TV Series, Episode: The Electric Vendetta
- 2001 - Swallow - Sir Terence - TV Series
- 2002 - A Prescription for Murder - Dr. John Rutherford - TV Movie
- 2004 - The Brief - Patrick Richards QC - TV Series, Episode: The Road to Hell
- 2004 - Julian Fellowes Investigates: A Most Mysterious Murder - Sir William Gull - TV Series, Episode: The Case of Charles Bravo
- 2005 - Ian Fleming: Bondmaker - Admiral Godfrey - TV Movie
- 2006 - Bombshell - General Kilshaw - TV Series
