= Peter Spence =

English journalist and writer (born 1944)

- Born: 24 April 1944 (age 82); England
- Education: University of Nottingham
- Occupations: Journalist; Radio writer; TV screenwriter
- Known for: Creator and writer of To the Manor Born

Peter Spence (born 24 April 1944) is an English journalist and writer. He created and wrote the British sitcom To the Manor Born.

== Early life ==
Born in 1944, Peter Spence was educated at Bromsgrove School, Worcestershire. At the age of 18, he became a reporter for the Birmingham Post and Mail. Around the same times, he joined the Territorial Army. He studied Politics and American Studies at the University of Nottingham and graduated in 1968, becoming a professional writer in the same year.

== Career ==
Spence has written for many television shows including Not the Nine O'Clock News, Crackerjack and Rosemary & Thyme. In the early-1970s, Peter married into the Taylor family who owned and ran Cricket St Thomas Wildlife Park in Somerset. This provided him with a fund of anecdotes which he compiled into a book entitled "some of our best friends are animals".

A few years later in the mid 1970s he created To the Manor Born, and after a radio pilot was made, the series aired on television from 1979 to 1981. Out of 21 episodes, he wrote 20 of them. The manor shown in the opening credits is in fact Cricket House at Cricket St Thomas – the home of his in-laws.

Spence has also written for radio, contirbuting to such shows as Week Ending, The News Huddlines, The Roy Castle Show, and Windsor Davies Presents.
