= Conservation and restoration of vehicles =

Conservation and restoration of vehicles may refer to:

- Conservation and restoration of aircraft
- Conservation and restoration of rail vehicles
- Conservation and restoration of road vehicles
- Conservation and restoration of watercraft, preservation and care of ships and boats often undertaken by historical societies and maritime museums
