= Angela Thorne =

English actress (1939–2023)

- Born: Angela Margaret Leslie Thorne; 25 January 1939; Karachi, Sind, British India (now Pakistan)
- Died: 16 June 2023 (aged 84); Battersea, London, England
- Education: Guildhall School of Music and Drama
- Occupation: Actress
- Years active: 1962–2021
- Spouse: Peter Penry-Jones (m. 1967; died 2009)
- Children: 2, including Rupert Penry-Jones

Angela Margaret Leslie Thorne (25 January 1939 – 16 June 2023) was a British actress of stage, television and film having performed roles in World in Ferment (1969), Get Some In! (1976), Midsomer Murders, Foyle's War, Heartbeat, The BFG (1989) as the voice of the Queen, Three Up, Two Down, and Lassie (2005).

However, she was probably best known for playing Marjory Frobisher in To the Manor Born (1979–2007), and for playing Margaret Thatcher in Anyone for Denis?, initially at the Whitehall Theatre in 1981 (for which she was nominated for Best Comedy Performance at the 1981 Laurence Olivier Awards) and subsequently for the video release.

== Early life ==
Thorne was born in Karachi, British India, in 1939. The daughter of an Indian Army doctor father, William Herbert Alfred Thorne, and a teacher mother, Sylvia (née Leslie), she spent the first five years of her life in India. She was later a pupil at Farlington School in Haywards Heath, West Sussex. She trained for the stage at the Guildhall School of Music and Drama.

In the BBC programme Who Do You Think You Are? featuring son Rupert, broadcast in August 2010, it was revealed that Thorne's father William had served with the Indian Medical Corps at the Battle of Monte Cassino and that his preceding ancestors had a long-standing connection with the Indian Army.

== Acting career ==
Her first professional engagement was with the Caryl Jenner Children's Theatre. After repertory seasons at York and Sheffield, she appeared in Night Must Fall at Theatre Royal, Windsor. Thorne then joined the Ralph Richardson Theatre company at the Haymarket Theatre, and played Gloria in You Never Can Tell, Portia in the Merchant of Venice and Julia in The Rivals.

Thorne's other theatre work included Little Boxes - Hampstead Theatre. She portrayed Io in Prometheus Bound at the Mermaid Theatre; Twelfth Night for the Prospect Theatre Company touring the east; Yahoo - Queen’s theatre, and many more productions around England.

Thorne received a nomination at the 1981 Laurence Olivier Awards for Best Comedy Performance for playing Margaret Thatcher in Anyone for Denis? at the Whitehall Theatre.

Thorne also appeared in television productions, including Elizabeth R as Lettice Knollys, The Liars, and The Canterville Ghost, playing the leading role opposite Bruce Forsyth as the Ghost. She played the part of Margaret Thatcher in a television version of the satirical, comic farce Anyone for Denis?, in 1982.

In 1969 she starred as Nancy Chuff in the comedy series World in Ferment. In 1984 she played the role of Susan, "The Duchess" in a West End revival of Giles Cooper's play Happy Family, opposite Ian Ogilvy and Stephanie Beacham. In 1996 she starred in Alan Ayckbourn's Communicating Doors at the Savoy Theatre, London.

Thorne appeared in two episodes of Thames Television's sitcom Get Some In! in 1976 as Mrs Fairfax, and in one episode of the BBC sitcom The Good Life in 1977 as Lady Truscott, before appearing as Marjory Frobisher in To the Manor Born from 1979 until 1981: her husband appeared in two of the later episodes. She reprised this role for both the 10-episode radio series in 1997 and the 2007 Christmas special on television. She followed this with a lead role in another sitcom, Three Up, Two Down. After To the Manor Born, she also played the eponymous character in the ITV sitcom Farrington of the F.O. written by Dick Sharples.

Thorne appeared in an episode of Midsomer Murders as well as in Foyle's War and Heartbeat. In 1989, she voiced the role of Elizabeth II in The BFG, the film adaptation of Roald Dahl's book.

In 2013 she appeared at the Vaudeville Theatre playing the role of Mrs Louisa Wilberforce in The Ladykillers. She played alongside Ralf Little, Simon Day and John Gordon Sinclair.

== Personal life and death ==
Thorne was married to fellow actor Peter Penry-Jones from 1967 until his death in 2009. They had two sons, both of whom became actors, one being Rupert Penry-Jones.

Thorne died at her Battersea home on 16 June 2023, aged 84.

== Filmography ==
Year	Title	Role	Notes
1969	Oh! What a Lovely War	Elizabeth May 'Betty' Smith	
1973	Yellow Dog	Jenny Alexander	
1975	Ballet Shoes	Sylvia Brown	Television film
1977	The Good Life	Lady Georgette 'George' Truscott	
1979	Lady Oscar	Mme Bertin, the Queen's Dressmaker	
1979	The Human Factor	Lady Mary Hargreaves	
1979–1981, 2007	To the Manor Born	Marjory Frobisher	
1980	North Sea Hijack	Woman on Train	
1982	Anyone for Denis?	Margaret Thatcher	Television film
1983	Bullshot	Hotel Manageress	
1989	The BFG	Queen Elizabeth II	Voice
1995	Cold Comfort Farm	Mrs. Hawk-Monitor	Television film
2002	Midsomer Murders	Lady Lavinia Chetwood	Episode: "Market for Murder"
2003	Bright Young Things	Kitty Blackwater	
2004	Foyle’s War	Lady Anne Messinger	
2005	Lassie	Dr Gull	
2015	Silent Hours	Mrs Garvie	
