= Desjardin =

French metal packaging manufacturer

Desjardin SAS

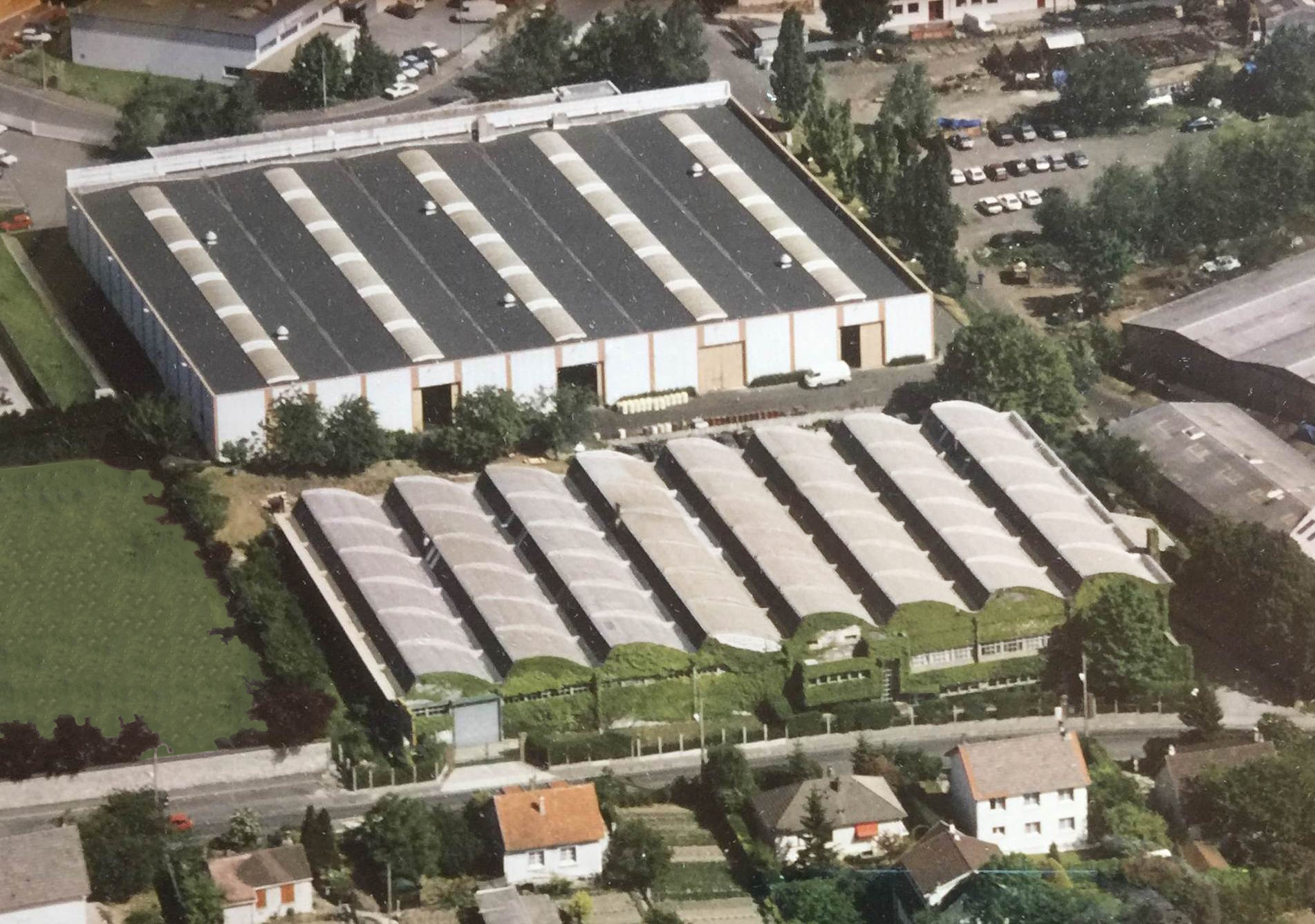
- Desjardin Metal Packaging, corporate headquarters in 2016
- Company type: Unlisted public company (société par actions simplifiée)
- Industry: Metal packaging
- Founded: 1848
- Founder: A. Desjardins
- Headquarters: Paris
- Key people: managing director: Pierre Gachot
- Products: tinplate and aluminum boxes, decorative tins, metal jars
- Website: www.desjardin.fr

Desjardin is one of the longest-running French metal packaging manufacturers, founded in 1848. The company produces and exports packaging for multiple industries, including the pharmaceutical industry, the cosmetic industry or the food industry. Desjardin places emphasis on sustainable solutions for its packaging materials and its tools.

The company specializes in customized metal manufacturing to produce cans and tins. Many of these custom products are aluminum containers .

== History ==
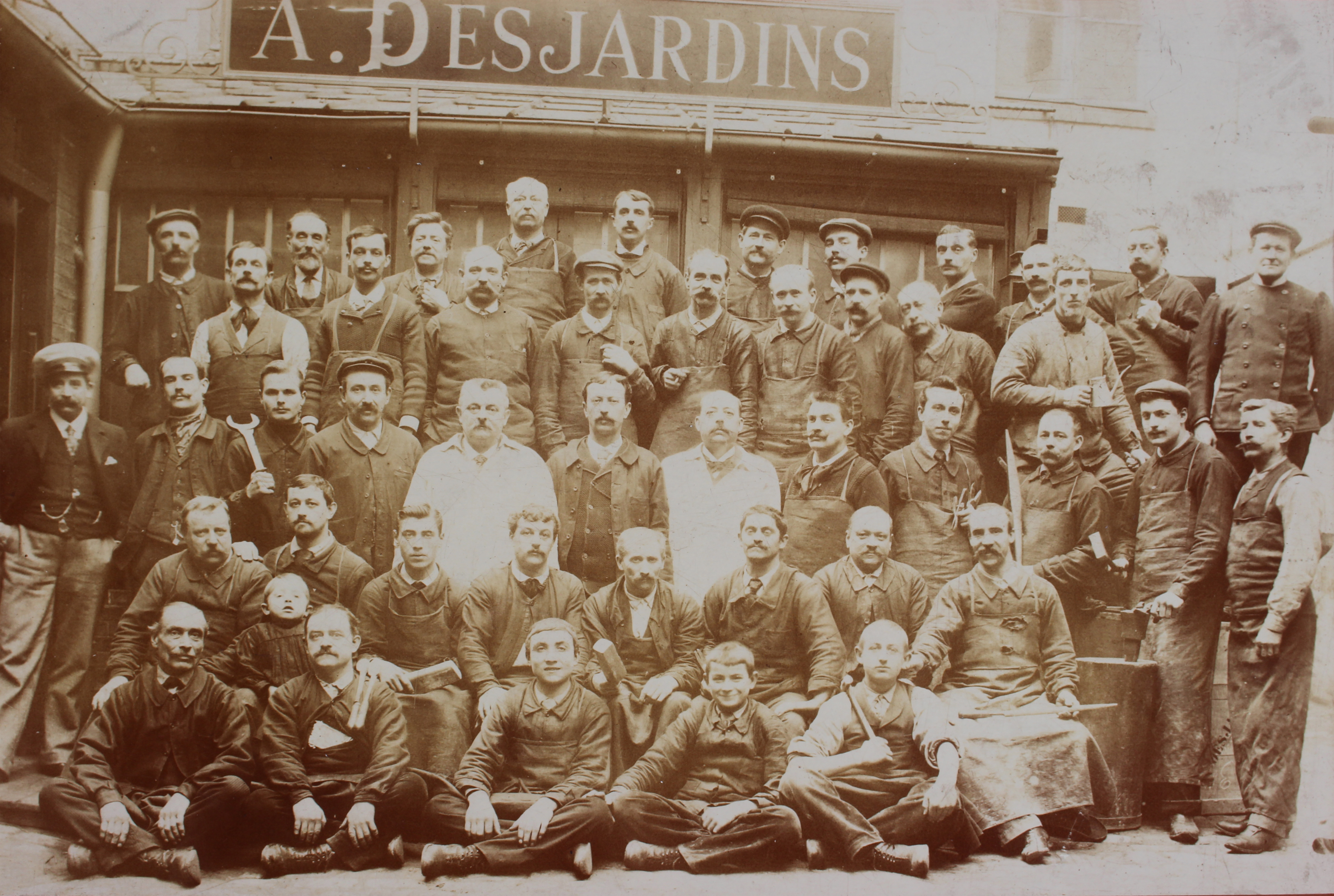
Historical photo of Desjardin S.A.S. from the 19th century, when the company was still named "A. Desjardins", after the founder.

The Paris-based company was launched by the Desjardins family in 1848, during the formation of the French Constitution and in the middle of the Industrial Revolution under the name A. Desjardins. The company later changed the firm's name to "Desjardin". The company produced packaging that served food preservation.

Desjardin used tin cans from its launch. It also manufactured tinware such as pots and pans. By the late nineteenth century, the company worked with film studios to provide metal cans designed to preserve 16mm and 35 mm films.

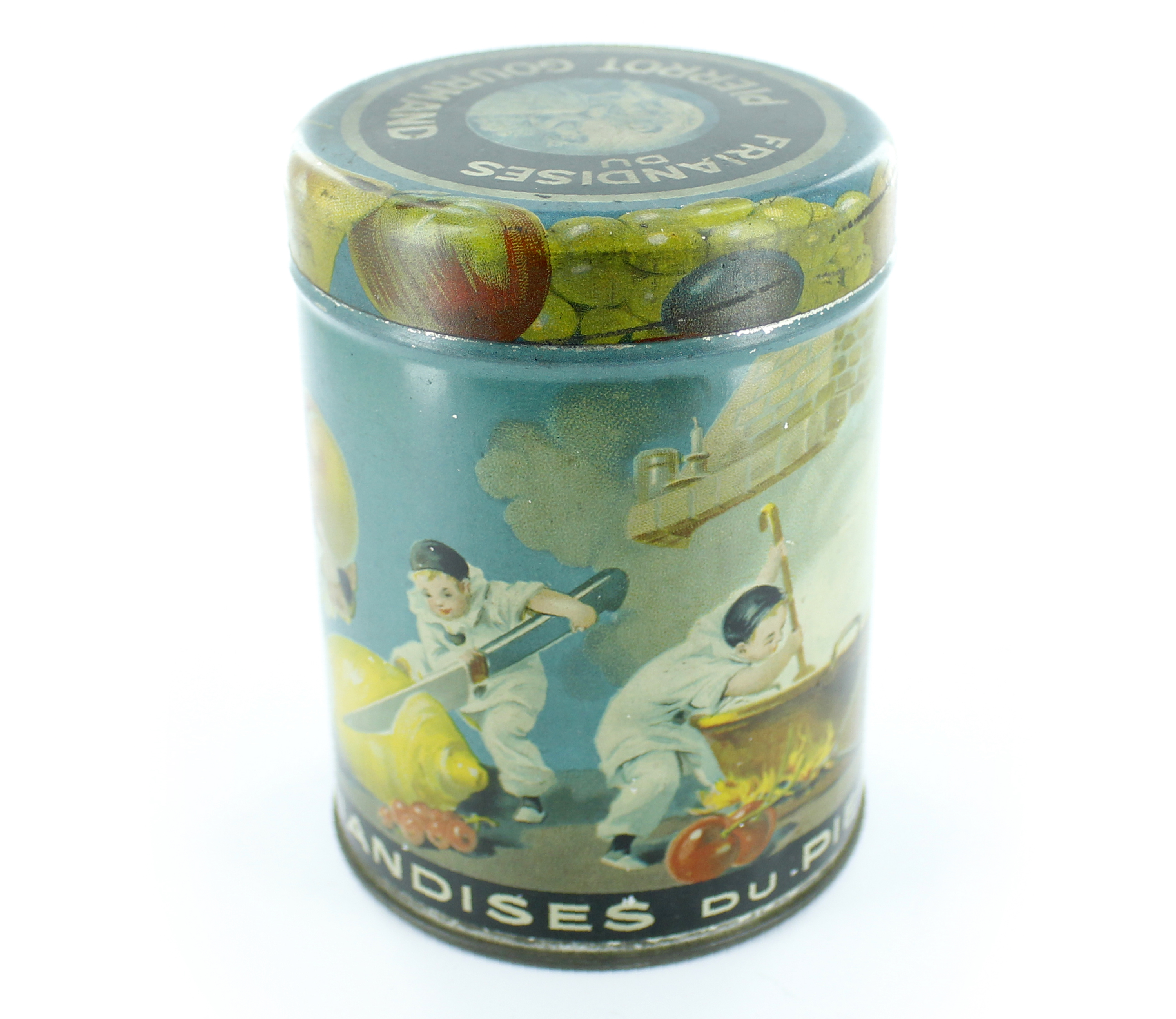
A historical metal tin for sweets or chocolate, produced by Desjardin in the 19th century.

The company established relationships with filmmakers and has played a role in protecting film throughout the twentieth century. It provided tin for Eastman Kodak and Agfa Geveart for many years. As a partner with Laboratories Éclair, LTC, Desjardin provided movie theaters with tins as well.

In the 1900s Desjardin expanded the number of industries it served to include biscuits and confectionery. After moving to the Paris suburb of Gonesse in 1963, the Desjardins family continued to run the business until 1981, when current President Pierre Gachot took over. Since then Gachot has introduced new packaging automation tools, such as the Caviar box vacuum closer in 1988.

== Desjardin after 2000 ==
Desjardin produces the majority of caviar tins and film tins worldwide. Beginning in the 2000s, Desjardin has partnered with several cosmetics brands and has shifted focus towards sustainable primary materials.

Vacuum packaging performed by its semi-automatic machine, the Vacuum Closing Machine (VCII), has allowed Desjardin to conserve offset printing inks.

As a manufacturer of packaging for the cosmetics industry, Desjardin offers containers to accommodate cream, balm, powder, oil, sprays and other cosmetics. The company commonly makes aluminum containers with screw on lids for cosmetics. Desjardin provides pharmaceutical packaging for products such as lipgloss, or gel. Typical containers are round with screw lids made of aluminum and metal tins. The company makes larger boxes for the food industry to package biscuits, confectionery and chocolates. They also make tin round containers for tea, coffee and spices.

== Sustainability and the Environment ==
Desjardin states that they mainly use Tinplate and aluminum as primary materials due to their environmentally friendly properties of easy recycling and lack of wasteful byproducts. Desjardin has been emphasizing the environmental benefits of aluminum, which include abundance, flexibility (engineering) and durability. While aluminum manufacturers must still deal with mining, chemical and landfill issues, Desjardin encourages recycling and is participates in the debate on developing more sustainable solutions. The company argues that aluminum is both lightweight and strong, making is highly efficient with minimal damage to the environment. Aluminum helps lower both shipping costs and greenhouse gas emissions.
