= John Rudling =

British actor (1907–1983)

- Rudling as Brabinger in To the Manor Born.
- Born: 18 August 1907; Maida Vale, London, England
- Died: 18 December 1983 (aged 76)
- Occupation: Actor
- Years active: 1938–1982

John Rudling (31 August 1907 – 18 December 1983) was an English actor active on both stage and screen who was known for playing the butler Brabinger in the BBC sitcom To the Manor Born.

== Biography and television roles ==
John Rudling was born in South Norwood, near Croydon, in South London, and was a qualified draughtsman before making his mark as a character actor, beginning with the RSC. He moved on to work at the Players' Theatre, London, before touring with ENSA. He worked in repertory as an accomplished actor and director until film and television work came his way. He was a member of the company at the Theatre Royal, York, for many years. He appeared in the Ealing comedy films. He appeared on television in a number of TV programmes such as The Invisible Man in 1959, Porridge in 1975, Wodehouse Playhouse, The Fall and Rise of Reginald Perrin, The Liver Birds and The Two Ronnies. One of his final TV appearances was in 1982 in Ronnie Corbett's sitcom Sorry!.

On television, Rudling is best known for playing Brabinger, the aged and dedicated butler in To the Manor Born. During the second season, he suffered a heart attack. He was absent for several episodes afterwards, but returned in the episode "The Honours List". He died in 1983 from respiratory complications.

=== Early television (1936–1939) ===
Rudling was an early player in the fledgling BBC television, which started in November 1936 until it was closed at the beginning of the War. He appeared in Pyramus and Thisbe (28 Jan 1938) and Who Killed Cock Robin? (12 Aug 1938).

== Selected filmography ==
- Night and the City (1950) – man (uncredited)
- The Man in the White Suit (1951) – Wilson
- The Titfield Thunderbolt (1953) – Clegg
- The Ladykillers (1955) – nervous man (uncredited)
- Law and Disorder (1958) – man in train
- Journey to Murder (1971) – Hodgson (The Killing Bottle)
