= Tied cottage =

Dwelling owned by an employer that is rented to an employee

In the United Kingdom, a tied cottage is typically a dwelling owned by an employer that is rented to an employee: if the employee leaves their job they may have to vacate the property; in this way the employee is tied to their employer. While the term originally applied mainly to cottages, it may be loosely applied to any tied accommodation. The concept is generally associated with agriculture, but may occur in a wide range of occupations.

The concept has been in use at least since the 18th century. There has been considerable debate, particularly in the 20th century, over whether the system is fair to occupiers, and a number of laws have been enacted or amended to improve their security of tenure. The concept still exists, though in a substantially different form from the original idea.

== History ==
Partly as a result of the Enclosure Acts of the 18th and 19th centuries, which denied free access by working-class people to common land, rural people became more dependent upon paid agricultural work. This was a key theme in Thomas Hardy's novel Tess of the d'Urbervilles. Counterintuitively, the rise of tied accommodation made rural workers less secure.

Tied accommodation became a common practice in 19th and 20th century rural England where the property owner, which might be an estate, a public or private institution or a farmer, could control who lived in the property. Rent was often minimal and considered part of the employee's remuneration or a "perk" of the job. Most large country estates had tied cottages for estate workers and parishes provided houses for incumbent clergy. Later the system extended to council workers, village police, services personnel and other occupations.

The practice benefitted the property owner by providing accommodation to workers close to their place of work, but was open to abuse by using the threat of eviction to control workers' lives or even political affiliations. The benefit to tenants was a certain level of security in the knowledge that they had a place to live as long as they continued working. The advantage remained firmly in the hands of the employer for the best part of two centuries.

== 20th century ==
Before World War I farm workers were seen by trades unions as effectively the property of the farmer, and tied cottages as a means for employers to hold down wages compared with other industries and to inhibit workers from joining unions. The issue was politicised as early as 1909. There was little change between the wars and in 1948 34% of farm workers were in tied accommodation. In 1976 this had risen to 53%. There followed a political struggle to end the system that was variously called servile, a system to maintain class power, or a relic of feudalism.

A contribution to the decline of the tied cottage system was that fewer farm and estate workers were needed as a result of the rapid increase in mechanisation. In mid-century large numbers of tied houses such as those provided to village policemen or services personnel were sold off to reduce overheads, and council tenants (who may or may not have been council employees) under the "right to buy" movement were permitted to buy their rented properties at a discount.

During a discussion on amendments to the Agriculture Bill in 1970, reference was made to the insecurity of tied tenants who, if they were no longer employed by the owner, could not expect to be automatically rehoused by the local council. The National Union of Agricultural and Allied Workers had long campaigned for the abolition of the tied cottage system, supported by the TUC. In 1963 it had been stated that a Labour government "would ensure that no occupant of a tied cottage would be evicted before alternative accommodation had been provided" but the 1970 debate made it clear that this had not happened. However, members recognised that farming practices had changed and the tied accommodation system was not suitable, and legal protection was too weak, but that a six-month pre-eviction suspension period had helped to some extent. It was observed that it would be impossible to run a farm without tied cottages, one reason being that workers looking after stock would need to live very close by their work.

In 1974 a Bill was presented to the House of Commons to abolish the system of tied cottages. The Bill was brought in by Bob Cryer MP in response to appeals from agricultural workers and other tenants of tied accommodation to "provide protection for tenants, yet preserve rights for farmers who can prove genuine need. It will ensure a cast-iron protection for those farm workers who have worked loyally in British agriculture so that they no longer need fear ill-health, injury or old age" and referred to the "evils of the tied cottage system". The Bill did not become law but prompted amendments to some existing laws in the ensuing years.

Sixteen Agricultural Dwellings Housing Advisory Committees were set up in England under the Rent Agriculture Act 1976 to advise local councils on requests to rehouse former agricultural tenants when cottages were needed for employees.

== 21st century ==
In 2001, following changes in the law in the 1970s and 1980s, protection of tenure was relatively secure for tied accommodation occupants; if they stopped working in the sector there was provision for the owner (in effect, landlord) to charge monthly rent at the market rate.

With increasing numbers of people priced out of the housing market in the 21st century, the concept showed signs of being revived.

The Agricultural Dwellings Housing Advisory Committees in England were closed in 2013. In a review of the modern state of tied accommodation, a Farmers Weekly columnist observed that, while it is complex and its appeal may have been undersold, in modern times it "generates more problems than it solves".

With increasing legal and taxation implications, the issue of tied cottages was still an area of concern in 2014 in respect of farmers creating security of tenure and thus difficulty in evicting workers no longer employed by them.

== Agricultural tie ==
Under planning regulations a property may be built on agricultural land for the purpose of housing agricultural workers. There are conditions attached which need to be fulfilled by any future purchaser of the property. The tie can be lifted if it can be established that there is no longer an agricultural need or that no one has worked in agriculture for 10 years, but breaches of conditions can attract fines. The advantage of an agricultural tie (to the purchaser) is that the property's value will be lower than the current market value.

== See also ==
- Company town
- Mill town
