= Roger Ordish =

British television producer (1939–2023)

Roger Francis Ordish (13 October 1939 – 26 August 2023) was a British television producer.

== Biography ==
Ordish was born in Yalding, Kent, and spent his childhood in a rural setting during the closing years of World War II.

Ordish attended Tonbridge School and then Trinity College Dublin, where he studied economics and political science and participated in the drama society. After a student performance drew the attention of a BBC executive, he joined BBC Radio in 1964. He worked on the magazine programme Roundabout, spent a brief period at the BBC World Service, and moved to BBC Television in 1967.

During his career, Ordish produced programmes such as Dee Time, Bruce Forsyth's Generation Game, and Call My Bluff, as well as talk shows featuring Kenneth Williams, Terry Wogan, and Michael Parkinson. In 1968, he staged a hoax at the Eurovision Song Contest that became part of BBC folklore.

After retiring, Ordish remained involved in creative work, contributing to local theatre in Lewes, East Sussex, and producing videos for institutions including Kew Gardens and Arundel Castle. He moved to Foissac, France, in 2007 before returning to Britain in 2018, settling in Richmond, North Yorkshire, where he volunteered at his local village shop. He also recorded a memoir, If I Remember Rightly, which highlighted his talent for impersonation.

He died peacefully a few days after suffering a stroke in 2023.
