= List of Bless This House episodes =

Bless This House is a British television sitcom, created by Vince Powell and Harry Driver, and produced by Thames Television for ITV. It stars Sid James, Diana Coupland, Robin Stewart, Sally Geeson, Anthony Jackson and Patsy Rowlands. The series was produced and directed by William G. Stewart for its entirety, while Powell and Driver occasionally served as writers, as did notable British screenwriters, Carla Lane and Dave Freeman.

The first seven episodes of Bless This House were shown in black and white due to the ITV Colour Strike which took place from 13 November 1970 to 8 February 1971.

The remaining 58 episodes of Bless This House were shown in colour from 23 March 1971 until the show's end on 22 April 1976, four days prior to Sid James' death.

During the course of the programme, 65 episodes of Bless This House aired over six series, between 2 February 1971 and 22 April 1976.

Four days after Bless This House ended with the 13th and final-ever episode of the sixth series, Sid James died from a heart attack after collapsing while on stage at the Sunderland Empire Theatre, aged 62.

== Series overview ==
Series	Episodes	Originally released	
Series	Episodes	First released	Last released
1	12	2 February 1971	20 April 1971
2	12	21 February 1972	15 May 1972
3	12	22 January 1973	28 May 1973
4	6	20 February 1974	10 April 1974
5	10	14 October 1974	16 December 1974
6	13	29 January 1976	22 April 1976

== Episodes ==
=== Series 1 (1971) ===
No. overall	No. in series	Title	Directed by	Written by	Original release date
1	1	"The Generation Gap"	William G. Stewart	Vince Powell and Harry Driver	2 February 1971
First ever episode. Sid tries desperately to understand his two teenage children, but the more he tries, the less he understands them. Note: This was the first episode to be shown in black and white due to the ITV Colour Strike.
2	2	"Mum's the Word"	William G. Stewart	Carla Lane and Myra Taylor	9 February 1971
Sid overhears a conversation between the doctors and, as usual, gets crossed messages.
3	3	"Father's Day"	William G. Stewart	Vince Powell and Harry Driver	16 February 1971
Sally has a date with a mystery man, and Jean has a surprise for Sid for Father's day; but Sid's suspicious mind throws a spanner in the works.
4	4	"Be It Ever So Humble"	William G. Stewart	Carla Lane and Myra Taylor	23 February 1971
Sid tells Mike to find a job, but much to Jean's dismay, Mike announces he is leaving home. Sally is so upset that she decides she is leaving too. How will Jean react to her children both leaving? And how will Sid cope with the fall out?
5	5	"Another Fine Mess"	William G. Stewart	Unknown	2 March 1971
Sid's boss asks him to look after a special gift that he has bought for his wife for a special anniversary. What could possibly go wrong?
6	6	"For Whom the Bells Toll"	William G. Stewart	Vince Powell and Harry Driver	9 March 1971
Dinner time at the Abbotts turns into a debate about the generations, and the morals of meat eating, as Sally and Sid lock horns. Sid and Jean suspect Mike is planning to elope.
7	7	"A Woman's Place"	William G. Stewart	Carla Lane and Myra Taylor	16 March 1971
After many years as a stay at home mother, Jean decides she wants to get a job. She knows the family will struggle without her though, so she hires a cleaner. Note: This was the last episode to be shown in black and white.
8	8	"The Day of Rest"	William G. Stewart	Dave Freeman	23 March 1971
It's Sunday, and Sid wants a day of rest, but with the sink blocking, and Mike creating his sculpture, a day of rest is the last thing he's going to get. Jean and Sid meet their new neighbours. Note: This was the first episode to be transmitted in colour.
9	9	"Make Love…Not War!"	William G. Stewart	Carla Lane and Myra Taylor	30 March 1971
Betty and Trev have a huge row, and Trev decides he wants to come stay at Sid and Jean's house. However, this doesn't make everyone happy, and trouble ensues. Mike meanwhile, decides he wants to be spiritual.
10	10	"Charity Begins at Home"	William G. Stewart	David Cumming and Derek Collyer	6 April 1971
Mike and his friends decide to spend the weekend living on bread and water, and give what they would have spent on food to charity. He encourages his parents to join him. They do; but Sid finds it a lot harder than he expected it to be.
11	11	"If The Dog Collar Fits…Wear It!"	William G. Stewart	Carla Lane and Myra Taylor	13 April 1971
Sally has been looking after the elderly in the area, and brings a dog home to stay, as one of the men she has been caring for has had to get rid of him. Sally, Jean, and Mike love 'Fred' the mongrel, and want him to stay, but Sid has other ideas.
12	12	"The Morning After the Night Before"	William G. Stewart	Carla Lane and Myra Taylor	20 April 1971
Sid wakes up with a hangover after a night with the guys. He has no memory of what happened the night before, and is stunned to see an array of items that don't belong to him. Meanwhile, Mike advertises his sculptures to raise some money.

=== Series 2 (1972) ===
No. overall	No. in series	Title	Directed by	Written by	Original release date
13	1	"Two Heads Are Better Than One"	William G. Stewart	Carla Lane and Myra Taylor	21 February 1972
Mike has created a sculpture which he hopes will make an impression with his peers, and win him a competition. But an incident with his sculpture means first place may be out of Mike's reach.
14	2	"Love Me, Love My Tree"	William G. Stewart	Carla Lane and Myra Taylor	28 February 1972
Sid and the family come home from a blissful family holiday, but Sid is incensed to see what neighbour Trev has done to his cherry tree. The whole situation causes major conflict.
15	3	"It's All In the Mind"	William G. Stewart	Vince Powell and Harry Driver	6 March 1972
After misunderstanding the relationship Sally has with a teacher, Sid and Jean get one particular 'fact' wrong, and it results in unpleasant consequences. Meanwhile, Mike produces an interesting painting.
16	4	"Another Lost Weekend"	William G. Stewart	Carla Lane and Myra Taylor	13 March 1972
Jean's father is coming for the weekend, and Sid is desperate to not have to tolerate a weekend with him, so he plans a weekend of fishing.
17	5	"Parents Should Be Seen and Not Heard"	William G. Stewart	Carla Lane and Myra Taylor	20 March 1972
Sid and Jean try to come to terms with their teenage daughter Sally, getting engaged to be married, to her new boyfriend Geoffrey.
18	6	"Strangers in the Night"	William G. Stewart	Vince Powell and Harry Driver	27 March 1972
When Sid and Jean, and Mike and Sally, go out for a family meal, Sid and Jean reminisce about when they first met. Back when Sid was a discharged soldier, and Jean was a WREN.
19	7	"Get Me to the Match On Time"	William G. Stewart	Carla Lane and Myra Taylor	10 April 1972
Jean wants Sid to go to a wedding with her and Sally and Mike, but Sid wants to go to the football match. He tries every trick in the book to get out of going to the wedding.
20	8	"Wives and Lovers"	William G. Stewart	Carla Lane and Myra Taylor	17 April 1972
Jean is worried Sid may take advantage of the fact he meets flirty women in his line of work. So she tries to trick him by pretending to be a woman who is interested in him. But he cottons on, and plays along, with hilarious consequences.
21	9	"Never Again on Sunday!"	William G. Stewart	Vince Powell and Harry Driver	24 April 1972
Jean convinces Sid to do something constructive one Sunday, instead of just lying in bed. So they go for a picnic; but things go awry when they get lost, and the budgie goes missing.
22	10	"People in Glass Houses"	William G. Stewart	Carla Lane	1 May 1972
Sid and Jean want to buy Mike a nice gift for his 20th birthday, but Mike wants a party at their house. Unfortunately for Sid and Jean, they aren't invited. So they decide to spend the night in the greenhouse so they can spy on the party.
23	11	"A Rolls By Another Name"	William G. Stewart	Vince Powell and Harry Driver	8 May 1972
Sid is enlisted by his boss to deliver the Chief Executive's Rolls Royce, but thanks to Mike and Sally's campaigning about how cars ruin the environment, things don't go to plan. The Rolls-Royce seen here is chassis number SRH2971, as known as the most filmed individual ROLLS-ROYCE motor car, ever, in films and TV series
24	12	"A Touch of the Unknown"	William G. Stewart	Dave Freeman	15 May 1972
Sid hurts his foot after tripping over Mike's friend's statue. Meanwhile Sally takes an interest in the unknown; so Jean, Sally, and Betty decide to do a séance. They all come to regret it though, when the house appears to be haunted.

=== Series 3 (1973) ===
No. overall	No. in series	Title	Directed by	Written by	Original release date
25	1	"It Comes to Us All in the End"	William G. Stewart	Vince Powell and Harry Driver	22 January 1973
Sid brings another feathered friend along to keep their budgie company, but they very quickly regret their decision. Meanwhile, Mike tries to avoid getting a parking ticket, and Sally has a mishap when trying to move Sid's car.
26	2	"Tea for Two and Four for Tea"	William G. Stewart	Carla Lane and Myra Taylor	5 February 1973
The family are curious about the lady Mike is dating, and are keen to meet her, but when Sally blurts out the lady's age, they are astounded. However, they accept her into their home politely. Is this REALLY Mike's new girlfriend though?
27	3	"To Tell or Not to Tell"	William G. Stewart	Carla Lane	12 February 1973
Jean is having a bad week, and is rather disenchanted with her life as a housewife. She is stunned, and a little bit envious, when she sees what appears to be her neighbour Betty having a fling with another man.
28	4	"Blood is Thicker Than Water"	William G. Stewart	Dave Freeman	19 February 1973
The whole family is stunned, when a long lost cousin of Sid's turns up unexpected, and uninvited, from America. What does he want, and how on earth can they get rid of him?
29	5	"One Good Turn Deserves a Bother"	William G. Stewart	Carla Lane and Myra Taylor	26 February 1973
Sid's boss asks him to look after his 250 year old Georgian tea set. Sid not only does his best to protect the valuable antique tea set, he ends up treating it like a new born baby.
30	6	"The Loneliness of the Ling Distance Walker"	William G. Stewart	Carla Lane	5 March 1973
Much to Sid's surprise, Mike has taken up running, and is planning a run to raise money for the hospital. Sid knows this is out of character; what is Mike up to?
31	7	"Watch the Birdie"	William G. Stewart	Dave Freeman	12 March 1973
Mike wants to start a career as a photographer, but much to Sid's dismay, he wants to use the garage as his studio. However, things don't go quite as smoothly as Mike expects them to.
32	8	"Aitishoo! Aitishoo! We All Fall Down"	William G. Stewart	Carla Lane	30 April 1973
There is total mayhem in the Abbott household when Jean and Sally and Mike come down with flu, and Sid struggles to cope. A woman's work is never done.
33	9	"Entente Not So Cordiale"	William G. Stewart	Vince Powell and Harry Driver	7 April 1973
Sid receives a letter from Henri and Odette who he met in France during the war. He reminisces about his time with them, and then decides to visit them, and take Jean along with him.
34	10	"Will the Real Sid Abbott Stand Up Please"	William G. Stewart	Vince Powell and Harry Driver	14 May 1973
Much confusion ensues when a doppelganger of Sid's is on the prowl; especially as he is something of a womaniser. Thanks to him, Sid has a lot of explaining to do.
35	11	"I'm Not Jealous, I'll Kill Him"	William G. Stewart	Carla Lane and Myra Taylor	21 May 1973
Jean is surprised when an old flame from her youth comes back into her life, and asks her to go for dinner with him. Sid is absolutely fine with this. Or is he?
36	12	"A Girl's Worst Friend Is Her Father"	William G. Stewart	Vince Powell and Harry Driver	28 May 1973
Sally is enraged when her father decides to intrude on her interview for a job. Although Sid meant well, he soon comes to regret his meddlesome actions.

=== Series 4 (1974) ===
No. overall	No. in series	Title	Directed by	Written by	Original release date
37	1	"Money Is The Root Of..."	William G. Stewart	Carla Lane	20 February 1974
Jean buys a new coat, but Sid says she must return it as they have a load of bills to pay. However, the family's financial situation may be about to change, but unfortunately, there is a catch.
38	2	"And They Will Come Home..."	William G. Stewart	Carla Lane	27 February 1974
Jean is upset when Mike and Sally announce they are leaving home, but cheers up when she discovers they haven't gone far. Then Sid thinks 'if you can't beat 'em, join 'em,' and decides to say he is leaving home too. Will he leave though?
39	3	"Who's Minding the Baby?"	William G. Stewart	Carla Lane	20 March 1974
Betty comes around to borrow something, yet again, and Jean and Sid somehow get roped into looking after Betty and Trev's baby for two days. They agree, but it's not long before they regret it. Was it this hard with their two children?
40	4	"A Beef in His Bonnet"	William G. Stewart	Dave Freeman	27 March 1974
Sid is selling his old car and is hoping to get the best price he can. Meanwhile Mike and Sally come home with Sid's car with a big dent in it, after a huge crate of corned beef fell onto the car. Will he be able to sell the car now?
41	5	"The Bells Are Ringing"	William G. Stewart	Vince Powell and Harry Driver	3 April 1974
At long last Mike seems to have found his true love, and he announces that he is getting married. To Sid and Jean's dismay, it's not long before Sally announces she has fallen for Mike's girlfriend's father. Can either relationship last?
42	6	"The First 25 Years Are the Worst"	William G. Stewart	Dave Freeman, Vince Powell (uncredited) and Harry Driver (uncredited)	10 April 1974
Sid and Jean plan a party for their 25th wedding anniversary, and Mike gets his friend to make up some invitation cards. Unfortunately, the invitation has the wrong date on it. Meanwhile Sally and Mike have an idea for a new career.

=== Series 5 (1974) ===
No. overall	No. in series	Title	Directed by	Written by	Original release date
43	1	"They Don’t Write Songs Like That Anymore"	William G. Stewart	Bernie Sharp	14 October 1974
Sid decides to write a song to win a cash prize in a competition. The problem is, despite what he thinks, he is not exactly in the same league as John Lennon and Paul McCartney; especially when he is inebriated.
44	2	"The Gypsy's Warning"	William G. Stewart	Jon Watkins	21 October 1974
After being warned by a gypsy that someone she loves will be involved in an accident involving water, Jean tries to prevent Sid from going fishing. But is this the accident that the gypsy was talking about?
45	3	"The Biggest Woodworm in the World"	William G. Stewart	Dave Freeman	28 October 1974
Sid brings a new chair home, but Sally and Jean are worried it has woodworm. Meanwhile Mike offers his friend a place to stay at the Abbott household. However, she has a guest with her that Sid and Jean don't know about.
46	4	"Home Tweet Home"	William G. Stewart	Brian Platt	4 November 1974
Sally and Mike are trying to raise money for a holiday, and come up with a plan to raise the money. However, they soon realise that they've bit off more than they can chew. Sid sails in to save the day though.
47	5	"You're Never Too Old to Be Young"	William G. Stewart	Carla Lane	11 November 1974
Jean feels like a frumpy boring housewife, and as much as she loves Sid, she feels that their marriage has gone stale. She has a plan to spruce it up; Sid is far from keen on the idea though.
48	6	"The Policeman, the Paint and the Pirates"	William G. Stewart	Dave Freeman	18 November 1974
Sid's boss wants Jean to star in his production of Pirates of Penzance. Sid is OK with this, but then he discovers his boss wants him in the show, too. Meanwhile Sally starts chatting to a policeman and Trev brings some paint home for Sid.
49	7	"Happy Birthday Sid"	William G. Stewart	Lawrie Wyman and George Evans	25 November 1974
It's Sid's birthday, and his whole family are being secretive about this great gift they plan to get him. Sid is excited, but will he like his birthday gift?
50	8	"Freedom Is"	William G. Stewart	Carla Lane	2 December 1974
Mike and Sally have a new friend; a tramp called Wally. Not content with giving him the family's food and Sid's new clothes, they invite him to stay at the Abbott household. This does not go down well with Sid.
51	9	"Mr. Chairman......"	William G. Stewart	Adele Rose	9 December 1974
Sid reluctantly attends the Residents Association Meeting. He complains about a lot of things, and inadvertently gets nominated as the New Chairman. He tries to take control of the issues everyone is concerned about, but fails dismally.
52	10	"....And Afterwards At...."	William G. Stewart	Mark Sharland and B.C. Cummins	16 December 1974
Sid is asked by Jean's cousin, to organise a wedding for her daughter, and her daughter's husband-to-be. He refuses, until he realises that there may be something in it for him.

=== Series 6 (1976) ===
No. overall	No. in series	Title	Directed by	Written by	Original release date
53	1	"The Frozen Limit"	William G. Stewart	Dave Freeman	29 January 1976
Sid and Jean acquire a new chest freezer, which sounds like a handy thing to have in the house. What could possibly go wrong?
54	2	"Beautiful Dreamer"	William G. Stewart	Jon Watkins	5 February 1976
Sid has been having dreams about strange things. Could there be a way of using the information in the dreams to win some money? Or is it all nonsense?
55	3	"Fish with Everything"	William G. Stewart	Jon Watkins	12 February 1976
Sid acquires some new tropical fish, and it's not long before he becomes obsessed with their welfare; much to the exasperation of his family. He becomes especially obsessed with caring for them, when he discovers one is 'with child'.
56	4	"The Naked Paperhanger"	William G. Stewart	Dave Freeman	19 February 1976
There are fun and games, and much confusion in the Abbott household, due to the word 'stripper' having different meanings. In addition, Sid does his best to make Mike move back home, when he finds Auntie Alice is coming to stay.
57	5	"Remember Me?"	William G. Stewart	Jon Watkins	26 February 1976
Sid loses his memory, when a shelf in the garage falls off the wall and hits him on the head. His family and friends do their best to try to help him regain his memory, but to no avail.
58	6	"Something of Value"	William G. Stewart	Bernie Sharp	4 March 1976
Sid hears from a solicitor, that he has inherited something from his old uncle Percy. The problem is; he needs to find an old photo of his uncle first. Will he find it, and what on earth will the inheritance be?
59	7	"Men of Consequence"	William G. Stewart	Carla Lane	11 March 1976
Much to the dismay of the Abbott family, they find a very unwanted guest in their kitchen. He is far from friendly, and does not take too kindly to being expected to leave.
60	8	"Skin Deep"	William G. Stewart	Jon Watkins	18 March 1976
Sid gets a new secretary, and much to Jean's annoyance he keeps coming in late. Also, he is off with his secretary to Birmingham for something work-related. It's OK though, because she is frumpy, and the size of a Green Line bus. Or is she?
61	9	"Friends and Neighbours"	William G. Stewart	Jon Watkins	25 March 1976
The Abbott family's neighbours, Trevor and Betty, ask Sid to keep an eye on their house while they're away. However, Sid doesn't do a very good job, and when they return, they are horrified when they discover what's in their house.
62	10	"Well, Well, Well..."	William G. Stewart	Bernie Sharp	1 April 1976
After three days of constant rain, the Abbott family's home springs a leak. They assume it's from a split water main or something of a similar nature, but the source of the leak comes from something none of them could ever have imagined.
63	11	"The Phantom Pools Winner"	William G. Stewart	Dave Freeman	8 April 1976
Sid lands a large export order at work. Mike plans to have it put in the local paper, so takes Sid's photo filling in his pools coupon but the newspaper gets the headline wrong and chaos comes knocking on the door.
64	12	"A Matter of Principle"	William G. Stewart	Jon Watkins	15 April 1976
Sid discovers where the money for his birthday party has come from, and he doesn't like it!
65	13	"Some Enchanted Evening"	William G. Stewart	Jon Watkins	22 April 1976
Last ever episode. When Sid discovers why Jean is sulking and Sally and Mike won't talk to him, he goes to the pub. Note: The final episode of Bless This House was broadcast four days before Sid James collapsed on stage at the Sunderland Empire Theatre and died from a heart attack on the way to the hospital.
