= Joyce Windsor =

English actress

- Born: 21 January 1932; London, England
- Died: 15 October 2008 (age 76); United Kingdom
- Occupation: Actress

Joyce Windsor (21 January 1932 – 15 October 2008) was an English actress perhaps best remembered for her portrayal of the cleaner Ruby in the BBC1 Comedy Butterflies by Carla Lane. She trained at RADA before working in Rep, then taking time away from the stage to have her children. She returned to acting in the late sixties with small parts in Dixon of Dock Green, Z-Cars, Doctor Who and guesting in The Two Ronnies, playing Ronnie Barker's double and appearing in sketches including the Short and Fat Minstrel Show.

== Roles – 1970s ==
In the seventies Windsor appeared in Steptoe and Son, The Fall and Rise of Reginald Perrin, The Good Life as Madam Chairwoman in the episode I talk to the Trees, and To the Manor Born as Dorothy Plunkett.

== Roles – 1980s ==
In the eighties, she continued with Bread, Terry and June, Sorry!, Last of the Summer Wine and Sharon and Elsie. In later years, Windsor played the Cook in Five Children and It and Connie Davis in Doctors, as well as having a stint in Emmerdale as a senile pensioner. Her last TV role was that of Lady Philpotts in the children's TV show ChuckleVision.

== Theatre ==
On the stage, she enjoyed several summer seasons at Gawsworth Hall with one year, as Miss Marple in Murder at the Vicarage. Other stage credits including Emma Hornet in a national tour of Sailor Beware, Muriel Wicksteed in Habeas Corpus, Mrs Kay in Our Day Out at the Key Theatre, Peterborough and Norma in Not with a Bang at the Palace Theatre, Westcliff.

Windsor ran a theatre workshop for many years in Stamford, Lincolnshire as part of the team at Tolethorpe Youth Drama at Tolethorpe Hall.

== Death ==
Windsor died on 15 October 2008, aged 76, from cancer.

== Filmography ==
Year	Title	Role	Notes
1971	She'll Follow You Anywhere	Cleaner	
1972	Hide and Seek	Mrs. Barker	
1978	Jubilee	Bingo Lady	
