= The Liver Birds =

British TV sitcom (1969–1996)

- Polly James (left) and Nerys Hughes
- Genre: Sitcom
- Created by: Carla Lane; Myra Taylor
- Written by: Carla Lane; Myra Taylor; Lew Schwarz; Jack Seddon; David Pursall
- Starring: Polly James (1969–1974, 1996); Pauline Collins (1969); Nerys Hughes (1971–1979, 1996); Elizabeth Estensen (1975–1979)
- Country of origin: United Kingdom
- Original language: English
- No. of series: 10 (+ pilot)
- No. of episodes: 86 (4 + pilot missing)

Production
- Running time: 24 minutes

Original release
- Network: BBC1
- Release: 14 April 1969 – 5 January 1979
- Release: 6 May – 24 June 1996

The Liver Birds is a British sitcom, set in Liverpool, North West England, which aired on BBC1 from April 1969 to January 1979, and again in 1996. The show was created by Carla Lane and Myra Taylor. The two Liverpudlian housewives had met at a local writers club and decided to pool their talents. They were invited to London by Michael Mills, the BBC's then Head of Comedy, and asked to write about two women sharing a flat; Mills brought in sitcom expert Sydney Lotterby to work with the writing team.

Lotterby had previously worked with Eric Sykes and Sheila Hancock, and on The Likely Lads. For The Liver Birds, Lane wrote most of the episodes, Taylor co-writing only the first two series. The pilot was shown on 14 April 1969 as an episode of Comedy Playhouse, the BBC's breeding ground for sitcoms at the time.

== Premise ==
The series charted the ups and downs of two "dolly birds" sharing a flat on Liverpool's Huskisson Street, concentrating on the two young single women's dealings with boyfriends, work, parents and each other. Dressed in the best 1970s fashions, they looked for romance in a loose female equivalent of The Likely Lads.

== History ==
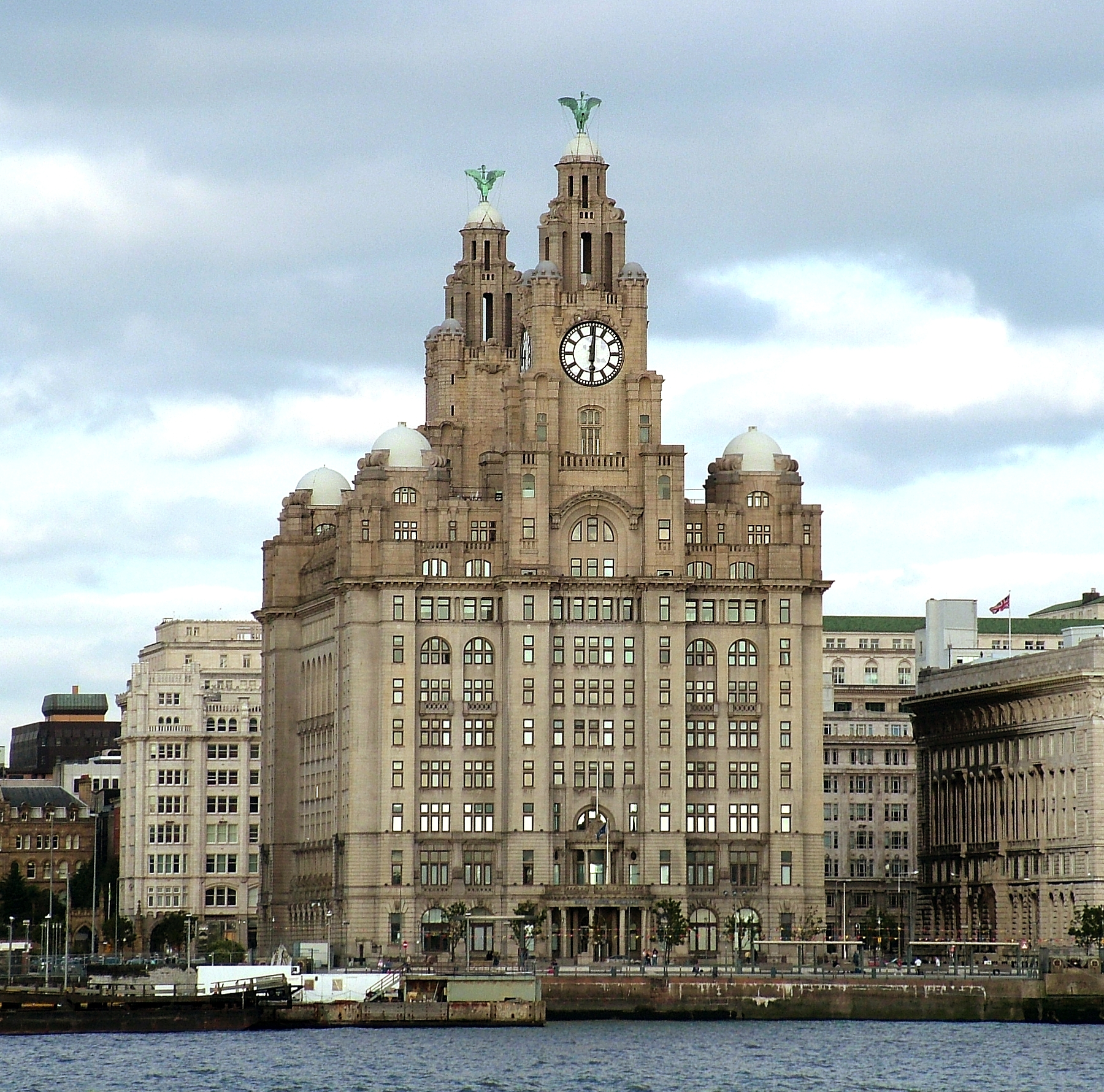
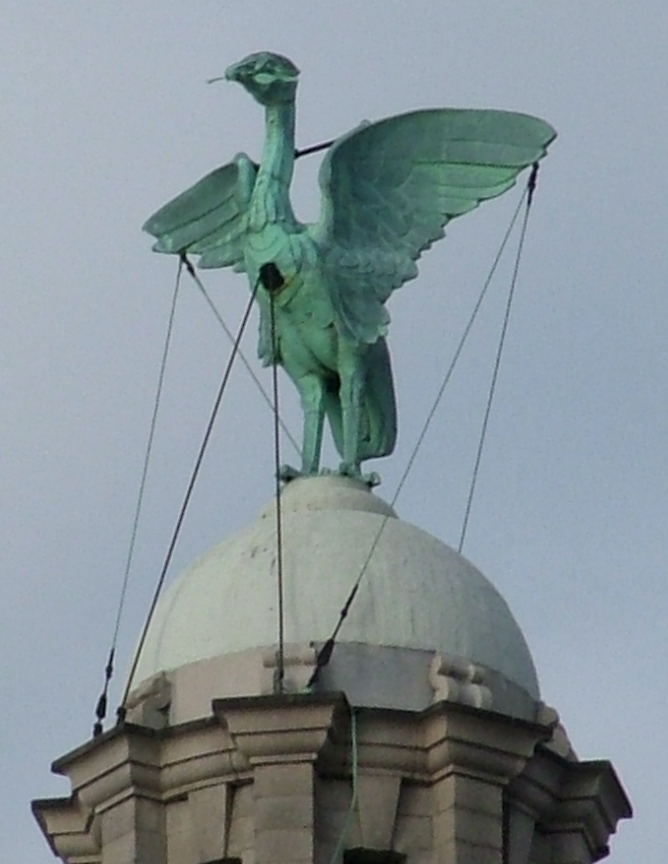
The Royal Liver Building, with a closeup of one of the liver bird statues

The pilot and Series 1 starred Pauline Collins as Dawn and Polly James as Beryl Hennessey. In Series 2, Nerys Hughes debuted as Sandra Hutchinson, replacing Dawn for the rest of the programme's run. Beryl was the more 'common' one, while Sandra was soft-spoken and more refined, due to the influence of her snobbish, overbearing mother (Mollie Sugden).

Carla Lane drew on her own mother for the character – "Mrs Hutchinson, I think she was my mother. I'm sure she was my mother". Beryl's 'common' mother (the Hennesseys live in Bootle, a working class town north of the city) was played by Sheila Fay. Future Emmerdale actor Elizabeth Estensen as Carol Boswell replaced Beryl from Series 5 onwards.

The title comes from the liver bird that is a symbol of Liverpool; two sculpted birds appear on top of the Royal Liver Building at Pier Head in the city. Michael Mills, who commissioned the series, came up with the title, although it was initially disliked by Carla Lane. The Scaffold – a pop group whose line-up comprised John Gorman, later of Tiswas fame, poet Roger McGough, and Mike McCartney – sang the title song.

Both the pilot and all four episodes from series 1 (originally aired in 1969) are missing, presumed wiped in their entirety, however, the opening titles (including some footage from one of the missing episodes) still exist.

The first series was stopped after four episodes because Polly James' hectic schedule—working every evening on Anne of Green Gables in the West End, then rehearsing all day for the TV show—was proving too much. By the time James was available again, Pauline Collins had moved to LWT's Upstairs, Downstairs. The producer Sydney Lotterby remembered having worked with Nerys Hughes on The Likely Lads and, wrongly believing the Welsh actress was from Liverpool, asked her to read for a part in The Liver Birds. (Neither actress really had a Liverpool accent: James was from Oswaldtwistle, near Blackburn, and Hughes was from Rhyl.) Impressed with Hughes' reading, he offered her the part of Sandra, and the new series, in colour, began. The first episode of the second series aired on 7 January 1971. The actresses got on well together. "The rapport between Polly and myself was fairly instant. It was excellent. It happened in a twinkling really." said Hughes later, and James added, "We just fitted together. We learned our lines sipping Pernod milkshakes."

Following the second series, Myra Taylor, who missed her family, stopped writing for the show. With 13 episodes commissioned for the third series, Michael Mills felt that the writing duties would be too much for Lane to handle alone, so he handed six episodes to the writing duo of Jack Seddon and David Pursall. This writing arrangement finished at the end of the third series.

Carla Lane became sole writer for the fourth series. She felt it was now time for The Liver Birds to start thinking about longer-term relationships with men. John Nettles played Paul, Sandra's (frustrated) boyfriend, and Jonathan Lynn played Robert, Beryl's boyfriend. "I always wanted The Liver Birds not to be too keen about marriage — not to down it — but not to be out to get a boyfriend to marry," Lane explained. Beryl's mother (Sheila Fay) voiced the critical view: "Man is the dog, and woman is the bone. He eats the best of you, and buries the rest of you, and when his dish is empty — he'll dig you up again." This would be the last series with Beryl; as Polly James explained: "The reason I left the programme in the end was that I felt I was in danger of caricaturing what was already a pretty outrageous character."

Producer Sydney Lotterby had to find a new leading actress to keep the series going after Polly James' departure. In 1971 he'd replaced Pauline Collins with Nerys Hughes, and Hughes herself spotted her potential new flatmate: 'I went to see a musical in town--Willy Russell's, John, Paul, George, Ringo..and Bert, and saw Elizabeth Estensen.' Lotterby saw the performance at Hughes' suggestion, and asked Estensen to audition for the part. 'She was loud, and abrasive, and exactly what I wanted,' said Lotterby. So Beryl, the bouncy blonde, was replaced by feisty, flame-haired Carol. Now into the fifth series, Carla Lane expanded her range from single life to family life and introduced Carol's relatives: the Boswells. "They were a close family—they were a dysfunctional family" said Estensen, and they included Carol's brother Lucien, played by native-Liverpudlian Michael Angelis; her father Mr. Boswell played by Ray Dunbobbin; and her mother Mrs. Boswell played initially by Eileen Kennally and later Carmel McSharry. Carla Lane's later series Bread revolved around the Boswell family and, in interviews, Lane agreed that the two families were probably related.

In 1996, 17 years after the final episode of the classic original series was broadcast, the BBC revived the series, reuniting Beryl and Sandra as they coped with the aftermath of their respective failed marriages. The revival was intended to feature Sandra and Carol and was written for the two characters. Very late in the day, Elisabeth Estensen had to drop out of the production, with Polly James stepping in just before recording began. As such, some liberties were taken with continuity: Carmel McSharry, who had played Carol's mother in series 8-9 returned, but had to be transformed into Beryl's mother, and Carol's rabbit-obsessed brother Lucien Boswell, played by Michael Angelis, became Beryl's brother Lucien Hennessey. Beryl's own back story was ignored and her marriage to Robert was not referred to, whereas a divorce from a different husband was often mentioned. The revival was not a ratings success and only lasted one series.

== Cast and characters ==
=== Main ===
- Pauline Collins as Dawn (Pilot & Series 1)
- Polly James as Beryl Hennessey (Pilot & Series 1–4,10)
- Nerys Hughes as Sandra Hutchinson (Series 2–10)
- Elizabeth Estensen as Carol Boswell (Series 5–9)

=== Recurring ===
- Mollie Sugden as Mrs. Hutchinson (Series 2–10)
- Sheila Fay as Mrs. Hennessey (Series 2–4)
  - Carmel McSharry as Mrs. Hennessey (Series 10)
- Ivan Beavis as Mr. Hutchinson (Series 2–5)
  - William Moore as Mr. Hutchinson (Series 8)
- Cyril Shaps as Mr. Hennessey (Series 2–3)
  - John Mckelvey as Mr. Hennessey (guest Series 5)
  - Bill Dean as Mr. Hennessey (Series 10)
- Paula Wilcox as Gloria Hennessey Titlark (Series 2–3)
- John Nettles as Paul (Series 3–7)
- Jonathan Lynn as Robert Fenning (Series 5)
- Patrick McAlinney as Father O'Leary (Series 4–8)
- Eileen Kennally as Mrs. Boswell (Series 5–7)
  - Carmel McSharry as Mrs. Boswell (Series 8–9)
- Ray Dunbobbin as Mr. Boswell (Series 4–9)
- Michael Angelis as Lucien Boswell (Series 5–9)
- Michael Angelis as Lucien Hennessey (Series 10)
- Jack Le White as Grandad (Series 5–6, 8–9)
- Jackie Fishel as Barbara (Series 5–6, 8–9)
- Tom Chadbon as Derek Paynton (Series 8–9)
- Lee Oakes as Gwyn (Series 10)
- Geoffrey Leesley as Rex (Series 10)

== Episodes ==
Series
Series	Episodes	Originally released	
Series	Episodes	First released	Last released
Pilot		14 April 1969	
1	4	25 July 1969	15 August 1969
2	12	7 January 1971	25 March 1971
3	13	11 February 1972	5 May 1972
4	13	2 January 1974	3 April 1974
5	7	5 September 1975	17 October 1975
5	Special	23 December 1975	
6	5	13 February 1976	12 March 1976
7	8	17 October 1976	5 December 1976
7	Special	22 December 1976	
8	7	23 September 1977	4 November 1977
8	Special	23 December 1977	
9	6	24 November 1978	5 January 1979
10	7	6 May 1996	24 June 1996

=== Pilot (1969) ===
No. overall	Title	Directed by	Written by	Archival Status	Original release date
1	"Comedy Playhouse: The Liver Birds"	Bernard Thompson	Carla Lane, Myra Taylor, and Lew Schwarz	Missing	14 April 1969
The first episode of the eighth series of Comedy Playhouse.

=== Series 1 (1969) ===
No. overall	No. in series	Title	Directed by	Written by	Archival Status	Original release date
2	1	"Potent Perfume aka An Interesting Condition"	Bernard Thompson	Carla Lane, Myra Taylor, and Lew Schwarz	Missing	25 July 1969
3	2	"The Photographer"	Bernard Thompson	Carla Lane, Myra Taylor, and Lew Schwarz	Missing	1 August 1969
4	3	"Aristocracy And Crime"	Bernard Thompson	Carla Lane, Myra Taylor, and Lew Schwarz	Missing	8 August 1969
5	4	"Torremolinos, Costa Del Sol Or Southport?"	Bernard Thompson	Carla Lane, Myra Taylor, and Lew Schwarz	Missing	15 August 1969

=== Series 2 (1971) ===
No. overall	No. in series	Title (Note: There are two different episode listings for Series 2. Sources that list the series always do so in air date order, though the two contradictory listings are both still used. This alternative listing is as follows: 1. The New Flat; 2. The Good Samaritans; 3. The Holiday Fund aka Housekeeping; 4. Look Before You Leap; 5. The Wedding; 6. Three's a Crowd; 7. The Proposal aka The Engagement; 8. The Man Downstairs aka The New Neighbour; 9. The Dog; 10. Grandad; 11. Mother's Day; 12. Promotion)	Directed by	Written by	Original release date
6	1	"The Wedding"	Unknown	Carla Lane and Myra Taylor	7 January 1971
Beryl's sister Gloria (Paula Wilcox) is having second thoughts about marrying Ernie Titlark (Barrie Rutter); "It didn't work for you, why should it work for me?" she asks her mother. "Because I married a slob." "How do you know Ernie isn't a slob?" asks her father (Cyril Shaps). "Well, they're all slobs—but you've got to marry them to find out," her mother replies. Carla Lane said she "always liked writing weddings because they're really funny, aren't they?--and ridiculous, let's face it." In the BBC programme Comedy Connections producer Sydney Lotterby had said, "we weren't even allowed to talk about the pill—which is quite ridiculous, I mean, it was happening, but there we are." In fact, it's mentioned in this episode: Sandra says 'Remember your mum when Gloria got engaged, "Oh, my daughter! my innocent little daughter!"' Beryl: 'Yeah, and there was our Gloria scoffin' her pill with her elevenses.'
7	2	"Look Before You Leap"	Unknown	Carla Lane and Myra Taylor	14 January 1971
Sandra is depressed over a misunderstanding with boyfriend Peter (Derek Fowlds) and Beryl, worried that she might do something stupid, tries to help.
8	3	"The Holiday Fund aka Housekeeping"	Sydney Lotterby	Carla Lane, Myra Taylor, and Lew Schwarz	21 January 1971
Finding their 'Holiday Fund' short of the money they will need to get to Spain for '10 days in torrid Torremolinos, 10 nights of madness in the Mediterranean,' the girls consider selling Beryl's antique night commode. Ken Jones appears. (In this episode Polly James fell victim to Carla Lane's eccentric choice of set décor: "We had in our flat, we had a commode. Things would go wrong and we were not allowed to stop." Nerys Hughes: "She was meant to have sat down on the commode and I'd forgotten to put the lid down." Polly James: "And I sat down and went right down into it." Hughes momentarily cracks up, but they carry on with the scene.)
9	4	"The Proposal aka The Engagement"	Sydney Lotterby	Carla Lane and Myra Taylor	28 January 1971
Sandra thinks she's in love with Danny (Tim Wylton) and wants Beryl to be out of the way when he's around. Beryl tries going to the cinema, then decides to take pity on fellow tenant Gerry ('All he ever does is go to the laundrette, or talk to his cat') and visits him, which makes Gerry think she fancies him. Meanwhile, Danny seems interested in just one thing ('I'd like to think that you weren't just physical—but, well, mental').
10	5	"The Good Samaritans"	Sydney Lotterby	Carla Lane and Myra Taylor	4 February 1971
Sandra and Beryl agree to look after another tenant's cat while he visits his parents for the weekend. Also: Sandra reads Bertrand Russell's Sceptical Essays and vows to be 'considerate and understanding and ready to serve humanity', but the effort to be Good Samaritans makes life awkward.
11	6	"Three's a Crowd"	Sydney Lotterby	Carla Lane and Myra Taylor	11 February 1971
Sandra's actress friend Victoria visits. She likes their 'so beautifully tatty' place, but her demands get on Beryl's nerves. Christopher Timothy and Joe Gladwin appear in this episode.
12	7	"The New Neighbour aka The Man Downstairs"	Sydney Lotterby	Carla Lane and Myra Taylor	18 February 1971
Suave Derek (Ronald Allen) moves into the house and excites Beryl's and Sandra's interest. They waste no time introducing themselves and when they learn that he spends his weekends in Llandudno, at his parents' guest house, they separately decide to follow him there. Carol Cleveland appears. (In this episode Sandra says to Beryl at one point: "I'm the handle-with-care sort, and you're the smash-and-grab sort." According to Carla Lane this reflected the Lane/Taylor writing team. "We knew we had to have one, one way, and one the other, and you had it on a plate. Myra/Carla. Polly was Myra, full of the devil, said what she thought. I was from a nice family and a little bit sort of Oh no you can't do that. I became Sandra. We used each other as characters.")
12	8	"The New Flat"	Sydney Lotterby	Carla Lane, Myra Taylor, and Lew Schwarz	25 February 1971
The women find themselves arguing, blame their cramped conditions, and try moving to a bigger property in Allerton. But when they find they need a third flatmate to make the rent, they end up back in Huskisson Street. Ken Platt, Nicholas Smith, Patricia Shakesby and Veronica Doran all appear in this episode.
14	9	"The Dog"	Sydney Lotterby	Carla Lane and Myra Taylor	4 March 1971
Just as Sandra brings home a stray dog, Mr Barrett (John Sharp) tells Beryl that the landlord (Aubrey Morris) is about to make an inspection—and animals are against the rules.
15	10	"Grandad"	Sydney Lotterby	Carla Lane and Myra Taylor	11 March 1971
Beryl and Sandra are looking forward to a free Saturday when Mrs Hutchinson telephones, asking Sandra to look after her grandad (Jack Woolgar) in their house in Hunts Cross while Mr and Mrs Hutchinson go to visit Aunt Dorothy. Damaris Hayman appears in this episode.
16	11	"Mother's Day"	Sydney Lotterby	Carla Lane and Myra Taylor	18 March 1971
Beryl and Sandra have both invited their mothers over for Mothering Sunday, but will they get on? And will they like their presents—plastic flowers and a lorgnette? (The episode opens with Beryl singing Burt Bacharach and Hal David's Anyone Who Had A Heart, a hit for Liverpool-born singer Cilla Black.)
17	12	"Promition"	Sydney Lotterby	Carla Lane and Myra Taylor	25 March 1971
Sandra gets promoted, becoming Beryl's supervisor. Beryl receives elocution lessons from Mrs. Duval (Fabia Drake), but this gets her into trouble when a posh customer (Diana King) believes she's making fun of her. Robert Raglan appears in this episode. (Fabia Drake had, at the age of 16, been sent to an expensive French finishing school Meudon-val-Fleury, where she learned the science and craft of superb enunciation from Georges le Roy, a life member of the great Comédie-Française. "I began to acquire an instrument that gave me the ability to speak very fast indeed while retaining complete clarity.")

=== Series 3 (1972) ===
No. overall	No. in series	Title	Directed by	Written by	Original release date
18	1	"One's a Crowd"	Douglas Argent	Carla Lane	11 February 1972
Beryl and Sandra leave their 'grotty bedsit' and move to Beech View, "a highly desirable residence". They go to 'O'Connor's Tavern' to hear poets reading their poetry—including Roger McGough (reading from his collection After the Merrymaking), and Sandra's favourite, Neville Kane (Neville Aurelius). Back at their flat, neighbour Mrs. Knowsley (Joyce Grant) asks Sandra to sign a petition to evict an "undesirable character". Beryl doesn't approve: "I'm surprised at you signing it Sand, you're usually so kind and considerate...we've signed a petition to get a fella we don't even know out of his flat"--and Sandra is dismayed when the target of the petition turns out to be Neville Kane. (Horace James, John Lyons, Frederick Bennett, Patti Brooks, Patrick Durkin and Maxine Casson appear in this episode).
19	2	"Birds on the Dole"	Sydney Lotterby	Jack Seddon and David Pursall	18 February 1972
Beryl and Sandra are out of work—on the dole. The landlord's agent, Mr. Hockle (Artro Morris), is checking the inventory, and their month in advance is due a week Saturday. The girls need money and get down to the Labour Exchange to sign on. Sandra thinks this is begging, and tries to go incognito, but the sanguine Beryl meets her Uncle Dermot (Ken Jones), Cousin Hughey (Brian Pettifer) and Uncle Jack (Bill Dean). The Hennesseys' loud behaviour leads to a scuffle in the queue. (At one point when Beryl and Sandra are standing in the street, Liverpool Cathedral rises up in the background while they are speaking next to a red telephone box. Both the cathedral and the iconic red phone box were designs of Sir Giles Gilbert Scott.) John Ringham and Norman Shelley also appear in this episode, which was one of the six Seddon/Pursall-written episodes of Series 3.
20	3	"Good Little Girls Should Be in Bed"	Douglas Argent	Carla Lane	25 February 1972
Beryl is with new boyfriend Robert (Colin Bell) in Sefton Park. He asks her to spend the night with him before he has to return to London in the morning. Beryl seeks Sandra's advice, telling her he's cultured--'likes books and paintings and old buildings.' Sandra tells her to go--'After all, you've got nothing to lose.' 'Cheeky cow,' says Beryl, but she decides to spend the night with Robert—but things go wrong when Robert disappears to buy some alcohol. (Susan Littler, Ann Michelle, Anthony Verner, Constance Reason and Julia Breck appear in this episode).
21	4	"Birds on Strike"	Sydney Lotterby	Jack Seddon and David Pursall	3 March 1972
Beryl shows Sandra slides of her days with a boyfriend, Roy, before he left again to sea—Beryl and Roy outside Lewis's, Beryl and Roy by the Mersey Funnel, Beryl and Roy on the New Brighton ferry—and the final one: Beryl at the dock gates with Frank, a man she'd met right after waving goodbye to Roy and with whom she has arranged a meeting for the next Sunday! Back at work at Blandings Cosmetics, Jim Royle (Clive Swift), a shop steward, knowing the Hennessey family's strong Labour tradition, asks Beryl to speak at a mass meeting calling for strike action—on that same Sunday. (John Junkin appears in this episode).
22	5	"Fell-A-Day Girl"	Sydney Lotterby	Carla Lane	10 March 1972
Beryl declares that she's a "fella-a-day" girl; meanwhile, Sandra's smitten with a new guy, Paul, until he doesn't ring her as he had promised. Robert phones Beryl—up from London he wants them to rendezvous in David's flat (David's in Mallorca). When a very pregnant, depressed Gloria turns up, Beryl puts her with Sandra so they can cheer each other up. But still unable to leave the flat, Beryl invites Robert over. Then her mother arrives.
23	6	"Birds and Bottom Drawers"	Douglas Argent	Jack Seddon and David Pursall	17 March 1972
Sandra eagerly reads her horoscope in her weekly magazine Young and Lovely, as soon as it's delivered by the paperboy (actor Brian Sweeney, also of Z Cars), who seems to have taken a shine to her. When her horoscope tells her green will be her lucky colour, she'll be caught by a handsome stranger, and a marriage proposal may be in the air, Sandra heads out to the shops all dressed in green. After unsuccessfully making eyes at several men on the streets of Liverpool, all she manages to buy is a 'hope chest'--a large bottom-drawer-style chest in which to store her future household linens. Later she deliberately gets caught shoplifting just to meet the good-looking store detective—and receives a shy proposal from her young paperboy as he delivers her next issue of 'Young and Lovely'.
24	7	"The Christening"	Sydney Lotterby	Carla Lane	24 March 1972
Beryl's sister Gloria (Paula Wilcox) calls round to invite Beryl and Sandra to be godmothers to her new baby girl. But Beryl threatens to not even attend the service because it will be at an Anglican church and "the Hennesseys have always driven on the Catholic side of the road." Later, the girls are looking after the baby when the Anglican vicar (John Quayle) calls round and seems to take a fancy to Sandra, much to Beryl's amusement. Indecision as to the baby's name right up to the moment of christening brings a timid Beryl into the church after all to declare that the baby should be named 'Beryl' after her.
25	8	"Birds on Horseback"	Douglas Argent	Jack Seddon and David Pursall	31 March 1972
The morning after a party at their flat, the girls need to redecorate their bedroom. Beryl invites round a former schoolmate who is now a decorator, and he does the job for free in the misguided anticipation of romance once the work is over. Meanwhile, Sandra's posh new man is involved in the local hunt and the girls go riding to try to impress him, but Sandra's horse leads her right into a large pond! This happens to be the last straw for the stable owner, who decides to sell the unpredictable horse to the catfood factory. Concerned, Beryl and Sandra buy the horse themselves and end up selling him to a farmer for a profit, some of which they spend cooking a luxurious meal for Beryl's decorator friend to thank him for his time and work.
26	9	"St Valentine's Day"	Sydney Lotterby	Carla Lane	7 April 1972
Beryl is depressed because she's feeling old and none of her romances seem to last longer than a week, so she visits the doctor's surgery and is given some tranquilisers. With St Valentine's Day approaching, Sandra and her workmates hatch a plan to make Beryl feel better by sending her many Valentine's cards. The next morning, Beryl also receives in the post a single red rose with an anonymous invitation to the local Italian restaurant that evening. Sandra has to convince Beryl to go, but later finds out it was actually a joke played on Beryl by one of the factory workers. However, at the restaurant Beryl does meet a good-looking man; unfortunately all the tranquilisers she's been taking interfere with their date. Keith Chegwin makes a 10-second appearance as a schoolboy in the doctor's waiting room.
27	10	"Birds in the Club"	Douglas Argent	Jack Seddon and David Pursall	14 April 1972
Beryl and Sandra are at Hunts Cross Rugby Club: Sandra's there because of Rupert. Beryl's not too impressed--"the fellas are more interested in beer and rugby than girls" and thinks footballers would be a better bet. Sandra gets picked to represent the rugby club in the Miss Hot Pants 1972 Competition. (Beryl, a Catholic, identifies as an Everton supporter in this episode and it is sometimes supposed that there is a religious root to the Liverpool--Everton rivalry, with Everton usually thought of as the Catholic team. In fact, both teams can trace their roots to St. Domingo Methodist Chapel.) Snatches of "Beg, Steal, or Borrow" (The New Seekers) and "Save It" (Gilbert O'Sullivan) can be heard in this episode.
28	11	"The Driving Test"	Sydney Lotterby	Carla Lane	28 April 1972
Spending an evening with the boss's son Aubrey (Clive Francis), Sandra's worried about Beryl; it's nearly midnight and she's not back from a tandem bicycle-ride with her boyfriend Johnny (Jonathan Lynn). When Beryl finally arrives, worn out from a trip to Rhyl and back, she decides she wants them to buy the second-hand car they've been talking about and Aubrey says he'll teach them to drive.
29	12	"Liverpool Or Everton"	Douglas Argent	Jack Seddon and David Pursall	5 May 1972
Sandra is with Joe (Bill Kenwright) when Beryl returns from an Everton match with her Uncle Dermot and a couple of other Everton fans and they argue with Liverpool-fan Joe, who is also captain of the works team at Blandings Cosmetics. The girls go to watch a match—in which Joe scores an own-goal and his team loses 7–0. Angered at Beryl's mockery of his performance, he challenges her to do better as captain of an all-woman team from the packing department. Beryl accepts the challenge and the team is trained by Uncle Dermot (Ken Jones). Bill Kenwright, a lifelong supporter and future chairman of Everton F.C., played a Liverpool F.C. supporter in this episode.
30	13	"The Parrot"	Sydney Lotterby	Carla Lane	12 May 1972
Just as Sandra goes vegetarian and starts collecting for the RSPCA, her mother asks her to look after the family's pet parrot, Napoleon, 'just for a couple of days', but Beryl isn't happy—she doesn't want psittacosis. When the phone rings, it's a wrong-number call: a suicidal man (Christopher Sandford) trying to reach the Samaritans; but Beryl, who answered, is concerned and invites him round for a chat. Felix Bowness appears.

=== Series 4 (1974) ===
No. overall	No. in series	Title	Directed by	Written by	Original release date
31	1	"Anybody Here Seen Thingy?"	Sydney Lotterby	Carla Lane	2 January 1974
Beryl receives a pet hamster, Thingy, for her birthday. When the pregnant Thingy goes missing, the girls hunt for her, even chasing after the dustbin-men on their weekly rounds in the streets outside the flat. Thingy eventually turns up as Beryl's surprise birthday party begins—she has made a nest for herself and her newborn litter in the hat that is Beryl's birthday gift from Sandra's mother (Mollie Sugden).
32	2	"Friends at First Sight"	Sydney Lotterby	Carla Lane	9 January 1974
Sandra's brother Derek (Lewis Fiander) arrives from Australia. He's a keep-fit fanatic and soon takes Beryl out for a morning jog around the local park, where talk turns to love as the pair share their latest relationship woes. Meanwhile Sandra and her parents become concerned when they find Derek's Australian marriage certificate and attempt to warn Beryl not to become too involved with him. In the end, Derek receives a cable from his wife telling him she does love him, and Beryl receives a phone call from her boyfriend Robert in London.
33	3	"Life is Just a Bowl of Sugar"	Ray Butt	Carla Lane	16 January 1974
Sandra has bought a cut-glass sugar bowl with money given to her by Paul. When Beryl points out "we dip our spoons straight in the bag", Sandra tells her she hopes the bowl will become part of a home she'll share with Paul and wonders about taking him to Hunts Cross to visit her parents, "a happily-married couple"--would he find the idea of marriage more attractive then? But just then the "happily-married couple" in question show up at the flat—talking about getting a divorce. What's the problem? 'I'm married to it,' says Mrs Hutchinson. ('It' is played by Ivan Beavis.)
34	4	"Where's Beryl"	Sydney Lotterby	Carla Lane	23 January 1974
Sandra wants to go to London for the weekend, and convinces Beryl to go too—after all, their boyfriends Robert and Paul (John Nettles) are there. When they arrive, Sandra gets a bright spacious room opposite Paul but Beryl gets a poky room at the top of the hotel. 'By the time I leave here I'll be on nodding terms with B.E.A.', she tells Sandra. She can't make contact with Robert, and Paul disapproves of the amount of cleavage Sandra has on show—so it's not the girls' dream weekend. the girls were hoping for. (Avril Angers and Fidelis Morgan appear in this episode.)
35	5	"Girl Saturday"	Ray Butt	Carla Lane	6 February 1974
Beryl discovers that she needs glasses and the receptionist (Jeanne Mockford) tells her they'll be ready on Saturday—the day Robert will arrive for a week in Liverpool after several weeks away. Beryl worries that he won't like her in glasses; besides, her face can't be covered with things--'it's too small.' (John Dunbar and John Rudling appear in this episode.)
36	6	"Pack Up Your Troubles"	Ray Butt	Carla Lane	13 February 1974
The girls are planning a holiday—Beryl wants Blackpool, Sandra fancies pony-trekking in the Pennines. Meanwhile, Sandra's parents have temporarily separated, and when the girls pop round to Sandra's late one evening, Mum (Mollie Sugden) has a gentleman caller, bearing flowers! But the new man in her life turns out to be a thief, the ice melts between Sandra's parents when they encounter each other at the girls' flat and the girls decide on Blackpool for themselves and give their Pennines holiday to Sandra's parents as a second honeymoon.
37	7	"Have Hen Will Travel"	Ray Butt	Carla Lane	20 February 1974
Beryl's persistent oversleeping leads to the girls getting sacked from their hand-cream-factory jobs. After looking for new jobs, the pair decide to take "a holiday with pay" working as labourers on a small farm in Caerphilly, Wales. Unsurprisingly this work isn't ideal for the girls, as they struggle to milk Myfanwy the Cow on their first day. The last straw comes when the farmer (Jack Walters) asks them to kill Henrietta the Hen for their evening meal. Managing to fool him with some frozen chicken from the local shop, the girls pack their bags and head for home, with two new feathered pets in tow – Henrietta and her sister Gwynneth.
38	8	"Love Is..."	Douglas Argent	Carla Lane	27 February 1974
Life is looking up for Sandra as she gets a new job as a kennelmaid ("£15 a week!") and a marriage proposal from boyfriend Paul (John Nettles). Beryl however is feeling down on her luck ("No job, no boyfriend, no fixed abode...") as everything she touches seems to go wrong and she realises her flat-sharing days with single girl Sandra may be numbered. A visit to Beryl's mum puts doubts in Sandra's mind as to the realities of married life ("Man is the dog, Woman is the bone—he eats the best and buries the rest...") and that night she phones Paul to say she's not ready for marriage just yet. Seconds later however Beryl's boyfriend Robert rings up with a surprise...
39	9	"Anyone for Freedom?"	Douglas Argent	Carla Lane	6 March 1974
Robert must come up from London to propose to Beryl in person. Excitedly they set the venue as the local Apollo Greek restaurant that night. For the rest of the day Sandra helps Beryl look at engagement rings and choose a new dress. She even offers marital advice ("Life is like a pack of cards, sex is the ace..", "More like the joker!" Beryl retorts). Sandra's boyfriend Paul (John Nettles) attempts a proposal of his own again, but Sandra chooses to wear the ring on her right hand as a "friendship ring". Meanwhile, disaster strikes in the restaurant toilets when both Beryl's new dress and her old clothes are stolen while she is changing. Robert gets drunker and drunker as he awaits her arrival; finally she appears in a spare Greek waiter's costume. When they finally meet, Robert proposes and Beryl accepts. But when the Greek singer gives the bride-to-be a congratulatory kiss, Robert starts a fight and ends the night in a police cell while the girls compare their new rings back at their flat.
40	10	"Follow That Ring"	Ray Butt	Carla Lane	13 March 1974
The girls have been seeing their respective boyfriends for the weekend. Beryl is slowly getting used to her "unlucky" red engagement ring, but then loses it while making Sandra a trifle. There follows a mad rush to the local hospital—involving Sandra's parents, Sandra's boyfriend, and Beryl's mum—as Sandra has swallowed the ring in a mouthful of trifle. They all wait together at the hospital while the doctor (Geoffrey Palmer) removes the ring from Sandra's oesophagus. The episode ends with Beryl heading for London on the train so boyfriend Robert can put the ring on her finger again—and mistakenly ending up on the train to Glasgow.
41	11	"The Bride That Went Away"	Douglas Argent	Carla Lane	20 March 1974
Beryl and Robert's wedding is a week away and the girls and their mums are talking of wedding plans when Robert phones with more good news: he's been promoted to area manager at work and will be moving back to Liverpool to live. But that night, after Sandra describes Robert as "Ugly Handsome," Beryl dreams of a wedding where Robert puts handcuffs on her at the altar instead of a ring; she wakes up with cold feet about the marriage and goes AWOL. When Paul (John Nettles) hears that Sandra's alone in the flat, he immediately rushes round to move his belongings in! Sandra tries to dissuade him and coaxes him to help her scour the streets of Liverpool searching for Beryl. While they're out, Robert arrives on the London train with a bad back; he's resting back at the girls' flat when a rainswept Beryl eventually arrives home again...but in what state of mind?
42	12	"Let Sleeping Dogs Lie"	Ray Butt	Carla Lane	27 March 1974
Robert is sleeping on Beryl and Sandra's settee for the week before his wedding, now that he has found a job in Liverpool. This is fine until Sandra agrees to do a favour for Mrs. Sayers (Edna Doré) and offers a home for the weekend to Skip, a large St. Bernard, who takes up residence on the settee. So Robert gets to share Beryl's room. 'I know how we'll calm you down. We'll give you a sleeping pill', says Sandra. But Mrs Hutchinson and Beryl's mother hear about Robert's whereabouts and show up with Father O'Leary (Patrick McAlinney).
43	13	"And Then There Was One"	Sydney Lotterby	Carla Lane	3 April 1974
Not everything is running smoothly in the build-up to Beryl's wedding to Robert (Jonathan Lynn): the carnations have turned up a day early; there's a stork on the wedding cake; the dog's run off with the ham; and the only presents she's received so far are a sexy pink nightie from Sandra and 6 steam irons. Then there's the mystery woman who keeps ringing up for Robert—and has written him an important-looking letter. When the girls visit this woman, they notice that she is pregnant! There's a poignant moment as Beryl says goodbye to the girls' flat for the last-ever time, as she is staying at her mum's house on the night before the wedding. Next morning, true to the theme of the wedding so far, kids let down the tyres of the wedding limousines so the girls and their parents have to resort to using a double-decker bus and a removal van to get to the church in time. At the altar Robert finally opens the mystery letter and reveals to an excited Beryl that it contains honeymoon tickets for two to Mallorca.

=== Series 5 (1975) ===
No. overall	No. in series	Title	Directed by	Written by	Original release date
44	1	"It Takes All Kinds"	Ray Butt	Carla Lane	5 September 1975
Sandra only has one serious flatmate applicant: the brash, common Carol (Elizabeth Estensen), who Sandra doesn't really take to—until her mum (Mollie Sugden) phones after another row with Sandra's dad and announces she plans to move in with Sandra herself! Suddenly Carol looks a lot better...
45	2	"Look After the Children"	Ray Butt	Carla Lane	12 September 1975
Carol meets Sandra's mum who tells her about her latest marital problems and the nice new man she has recently met at a local hotel. That night the girls head to the hotel to stop Sandra's mum doing anything she may regret later. They finally succeed in disrupting the whole evening—only to discover that the "mystery man" was Sandra's dad.
46	3	"You've Got To Laugh"	Ray Butt	Carla Lane	19 September 1975
The girls are fed up of having to visit the launderette each week because they have no washing machine. Carol's brother Lucien (Michael Angelis) calls round to announce that their Uncle Billy has died and Carol may be due some money in the will. Sandra is excited when a new washing machine is delivered to the house whilst she is spending some time there with boyfriend Paul (John Nettles)--but Carol has only inherited £2, so they have to sell the washing machine to Carol's mother, who got the lion's share of the will...
47	4	"Love is a Many stupid Thing"	Ray Butt	Carla Lane	26 September 1975
Sandra becomes a vegetarian and joins an animal-rights march through the streets of Liverpool. She meets a good-looking man there called Bill and stays out with him until the small hours of the night, to the annoyance of her boyfriend Paul who was waiting in his car outside her flat to see what time she finally got home. The snag: Bill is a former boyfriend of Carol's and when he calls round to the flat Sandra realises her and Carol both fancy the same man...
48	5	"Dinner for Three"	Ray Butt	Carla Lane	3 October 1975
When Sandra realizes that Carol is hurt by Sandra seeing Bill, she decides to break it off. But Carol later has a change of heart and sets the pair up on a blind date at the local bistro. Unfortunately, Bill reveals he was only pretending to be vegetarian; he actually has a job driving cattle to the slaughterhouse. When Sandra, hurt, rushes home, she discovers that Carol has lined up a date with Sandra's own previous boyfriend (John Nettles).
49	6	"The Lily and the Dandelion"	Sydney Lotterby	Carla Lane	10 October 1975
Sandra has taken to feeding the local pigeons while out sunbathing, to the annoyance of the flats' residents. They finally call the council in to place cages on the roof to trap and remove the 'vermin'. Sandra, upset, sets some of them free, keeping one poorly specimen in a parrot cage in her flat until it gets better. Carol isn't happy, rows with her ("The Lily and the Dandelion never grow on the same patch..."), and temporarily goes back to her parents. Sandra ends up trapped on the roof when someone takes her ladder away; she has to be rescued by the local police, who warn her not to interfere with the pigeons anymore.
50	7	"Everybody is Beautiful"	Ray Butt	Carla Lane	17 October 1975
Carol would like some money to go to London to search for the father she hasn't seen in 5 years. Suddenly the £50 prize money for a beauty contest held at the biscuit factory where she works seems irresistible. With Sandra's help and her boyfriend Paul's (John Nettles) encouragement, she tries a series of increasingly unsuccessful beauty treatments before deciding not to enter the contest after all—and gets a beautiful surprise.
Special
51	S	"In Every Street"	Unknown	Carla Lane	23 December 1975
The First Christmas-themed episode

=== Series 6 (1976) ===
No. overall	No. in series	Title	Directed by	Written by	Original release date
52	1	"Facing Up to Life"	Unknown	Carla Lane	13 February 1976
Sandra and Carol take tranquillisers to cope with "Nervous exhaustion".
53	2	"Maypole"	Unknown	Carla Lane	20 February 1976
54	3	"Honey"	Unknown	Carla Lane	27 February 1976
55	4	"The Never-Ending End"	Unknown	Carla Lane	5 March 1976
56	5	"Badgers and Otters"	Unknown	Carla Lane	12 March 1976

=== Series 7 (1976) ===
No. overall	No. in series	Title	Directed by	Written by	Original release date
57	1	"Friends and Lovers"	Unknown	Carla Lane	17 October 1976
58	2	"She Dreams A Lot"	Unknown	Carla Lane	24 October 1976
Sandra has a premonition that death is imminent.
59	3	"A Mark on the World"	Unknown	Carla Lane	31 October 1976
When a mugger gives her a stolen handbag, Sandra is thrust into the limelight when onlookers think that she wrestled it from him.
60	4	"Love 'Em – And Almost Leave 'Em"	Unknown	Carla Lane	7 November 1976
In this episode, The girls receive a visit from Carol's pregnant cousin Aveline (Judith Lloyd), Which brings up the issues of men, babies...and marriage.
61	5	"Oh' The Shame of It"	Unknown	Carla Lane	14 November 1976
Carol has a new boyfriend but neither Sandra or Carol's family think much of him.
62	6	"Cry Please"	Douglas Argent	Carla Lane	21 November 1976
Carol is too much in love to notice that her new man might be trying to change her.
63	7	"The 'Nearly' Hat"	Unknown	Carla Lane	28 November 1976
Sandra and Carol decide to try their hand at market trading in order to buy something for their mothers.
64	8	"Yellow and Green Make Blue"	Unknown	Carla Lane	5 December 1976
The girls decide to decorate the flat, but their furniture is stolen from the hallway.
Special
65	S	"It Insists on Coming Once a Year"	Unknown	Carla Lane	22 December 1976
The Second Christmas-themed episode

=== Series 8 (1977) ===
No. overall	No. in series	Title	Directed by	Written by	Original release date
66	1	"Something Beginning"	Unknown	Carla Lane	23 September 1977
67	2	"The Flower Picker"	Unknown	Carla Lane	30 September 1977
68	3	"You've No Idea What I've Been Through"	Unknown	Carla Lane	7 October 1977
69	4	"God Bless Us and Save Us"	Unknown	Carla Lane	14 October 1977
70	5	"They Decide Up There What Goes on Down Here"	Unknown	Carla Lane	21 October 1977
71	6	"The Edge"	Unknown	Carla Lane	28 October 1977
72	7	"The Struggle"	Unknown	Carla Lane	4 November 1977
Special
73	S	"Open Your Eyes – And It Still Hasn't Gone"	Unknown	Carla Lane	23 December 1977
The third and final Christmas-themed special

=== Series 9 (1978) ===
No. overall	No. in series	Title	Directed by	Written by	Original release date
74	1	"There's No Place Like Away From Home"	Unknown	Carla Lane	24 November 1978
75	2	"The Sixth Day"	Unknown	Carla Lane	1 December 1978
76	3	"Various Kinds of Old"	Unknown	Carla Lane	8 December 1978
77	4	"Weeds"	Unknown	Carla Lane	15 December 1978
78	5	"Somewhere To Live ... Somewhere To Love"	Unknown	Carla Lane	29 December 1978
79	6	"The Best Things in Life Are Not Free"	Unknown	Carla Lane	5 January 1979

=== Series 10 (1996) ===
No. overall	No. in series	Title	Directed by	Written by	Original release date
80	1	"Hello Again"	Angela de Chastelai Smith	Carla Lane	6 May 1996
Beryl and Sandra are back together, bruised by what life has offered them and refusing to admit to middle age.
81	2	"Mrs. Boswell Comes to Call"	Angela de Chastelai Smith	Carla Lane	13 May 1996
Secrets rise to the surface when Beryl and Sandra settle down with a bottle of wine.
82	3	"Spare the Tree!"	Angela de Chastelai Smith	Carla Lane	20 May 1996
Beryl and Sandra join a demonstration to save a tree, but Beryl is taken aback when Sandra assumes the role of revolutionary leader and sends the peaceful demonstrators into battle.
83	4	"On the Town"	Angela de Chastelai Smith	Carla Lane	26 May 1996
In an effort to cheer themselves up, Sandra and Beryl go out on the town.
84	5	"Going into Hospital"	Angela de Chastelai Smith	Carla Lane	3 June 1996
Beryl urges Sandra to spend a week with Rex while her mother is in hospital. Meanwhile, Gwyn goes on the run.
85	6	"Out of Hospital"	Angela de Chastelai Smith	Carla Lane	17 June 1996
When Sandra's mother went into hospital Sandra had passionate nights with Rex in her home, but now Mrs Hutchinson is back, Sandra's life quickly reverts to normal. For Beryl there is some comfort when she gets a call from Gwyn, her runaway son; and Mrs Hennesey turns to God for her lottery numbers.
86	7	"Moving Out?"	Angela de Chastelai Smith	Carla Lane	24 June 1996
The recently reunited friends have a furious row about their mothers after Beryl's noise disturbs Sandra's fantasy about her beloved Rex. Beryl decides to move out of Sandra's house. Is this the end of the two women's friendship?

== Broadcast ==
Broadcast schedule
Series	Episodes	Timeslot
Pilot		Monday 7.30 pm
1	4	Fridays 8.20 pm
2	12	Thursdays 7.45 pm
3	13	Fridays 7.40 pm • 7.45 pm (episode 5) • 7.30 pm (episode 8)
4	13	Wednesdays 7.40 pm • 6.50 pm (episode 11)
5	7	Fridays 8.30 pm • 8.00 pm (episode 7)
5	Special	Tuesday 8.25 pm
6	5	Fridays 8.00 pm • 8.30 pm (episode 5)
7	8	Sundays 8.15 pm
7	Special	Wednesday 10.00 pm
8	7	Fridays 8.30 pm • 8.25 pm (episode 7)
8	Special	Friday 8.25 pm
9	6	Fridays 8.30 pm
10	7	Mondays 8.30 pm • Sunday 8.20 pm (episode 4)

== Other media ==
=== Christmas Night with the Stars ===
On 25 December 1972, a Liver Birds short was broadcast as part of Christmas Night with the Stars, a programme shown annually on Christmas night, when leading BBC performers appeared in short versions of their series, typically 5–10 minutes long.

=== Musical adaptation ===
In 2018, the series was adapted into a musical production entitled, Liver Birds Flying Home. Lyrics were by Barb Jungr; music by Mike Lindup; book by Barb Jungr, George Seaton & Linda McDermott; and the play was directed by Benji Sperring.

== DVD releases ==
Only the second series was released on DVD, by Universal Playback in the UK in 2003. It has since gone out of print, with retailers such as Amazon only listing used copies, and was notable for placing the episodes in production order rather than transmission order (resulting in some continuity errors).

The Liver Birds: The Complete Second Series was released in Australia, in a set containing the correct transmission order, on 14 January 2010 via Madman Entertainment.

In January 2013, it was announced that Acorn Media UK had obtained the rights to release The Liver Birds onto DVD. The Liver Birds Collection One (containing The Complete Second Series, this time, in Transmission Order) was released on 8 April 2013.

The Liver Birds: Collection Two (containing The Complete Third Series) was released on 7 July 2014.

A 4-disc set, (consisting both Collections ONE and TWO) was later released on 26 October 2015, So far Series 2 and 3 have been released onto DVD, but Acorn has no plans to release any further series.

- Collection One – (The Complete 2nd Series – Bonus, Exclusive Interview) – Released 8 April 2013.
- Collection Two – (The Complete 3rd Series) – Released 7 July 2014.
