= Mum's the Word =

Mum's the word is an English idiom for keeping silent.

Mum's the Word may also refer to:

- Mum's the Word (film), a 1996 Canadian documentary short film
- Kingsman: Mum's the Word, a 2016 British one-shot comic book in the Kingsman franchise
- "Mum's the Word" (Bless This House), a 1971 television episode
- "Mum's the Word" (Miranda), also known as "Holiday", a 2009 television episode

== See also ==
- "Mom's the Word", a 2014 episode of Family Guy
- "Mom's the Word!", a 1988 episode of The Raccoons
