= Bernard Thompson (director) =

British television producer and director (1926–1998)

Bernard Thompson (25 July 1926 – 19 November 1998) was a British television producer and director most famous for his work on Last of the Summer Wine and Are You Being Served?. Thompson served as producer and director during Last of the Summer Wine's second series. Thompson also served as a director on Are You Being Served?.

== Filmography ==
=== Director ===
- Are You Being Served? (1972–1973)
- Last of the Summer Wine (1975)
- Only Fools and Horses (1981)
- The District Nurse (1984)

=== Producer ===
- Last of the Summer Wine (1975)
- I Didn't Know You Cared (1975–1979)
- Only Fools and Horses (1981)
