= No Strings (1974 TV series) =

1974 British TV sitcom

- Genre: Sitcom
- Written by: Carla Lane
- Starring: Rita Tushingham; Keith Barron
- Composer: Ken Jones
- Country of origin: United Kingdom
- Original language: English
- No. of series: 1
- No. of episodes: 7

Production
- Producer: John Howard Davies
- Running time: 30 minutes
- Production company: BBC

Original release
- Network: BBC 1
- Release: 4 October – 8 November 1974

No Strings is a British television sitcom which aired on BBC1 in one series of six episodes in 1974. Written by Carla Lane, it was spun-off from an episode of the Comedy Playhouse screened in April of the same year.

Actors appearing in individual episodes included Felix Bowness, Brenda Cowling, Jessica Benton, Louis Mahoney, Tommy Godfrey, Alister Williamson, Norman Mitchell and April Walker.

== Plot ==
Derek advertises for a new flatmate, but does not get what he expects when the unusual Leonora moves in.

== Main cast ==
- Rita Tushingham as Leonora
- Keith Barron as Derek
- Gilly McIver as Iris
- David Simeon as Bruce

== Bibliography ==
- Horace Newcomb. Encyclopedia of Television. Routledge, 2014.
