= Ray Dunbobbin =

English actor

- Born: Raymond Harold Dunbobbin; 31 March 1931; Canada
- Died: August 1998 (aged 67); Liverpool, England
- Occupation: Actor

Raymond Harold Dunbobbin (31 March 1931 – August 1998) was a Canadian-born English actor, scriptwriter and dramatist who appeared in numerous television productions. He is perhaps best remembered as Mr Boswell in The Liver Birds and his regular role as Ralph Hardwick in the soap opera Brookside.

== Early life ==
He was born in Canada but moved to Liverpool as a child. After he left school he worked in art studios and performed in amateur dramatics. He was then asked to double for the actor Sam Kydd in a film being shot in Birkenhead.

== Television appearances ==
His television appearances included; Bergerac, Doctor Who, How We Used to Live, Last of the Summer Wine, I Didn't Know You Cared, Crown Court, The Good Life and Porridge, as the lightbulb eating prisoner Evans.

== Scriptwriter ==
He wrote scripts for television programmes including Z-Cars and for radio and stage productions. He was also an after dinner speaker and narrator.

He died of a heart attack in 1998 at the age of 67.
