= Butterflies (TV series) =

British TV sitcom (1978–1983)

- Genre: Sitcom
- Created by: Carla Lane
- Written by: Carla Lane
- Directed by: Gareth Gwenlan (1978–79); John B. Hobbs (1979–80); Sydney Lotterby (1980–83); Mandie Fletcher (1983)
- Starring: Wendy Craig; Geoffrey Palmer; Nicholas Lyndhurst; Andrew Hall; Bruce Montague; Michael Ripper; Joyce Windsor
- Theme music composer: Dolly Parton
- Opening theme: "Love Is Like a Butterfly"
- Ending theme: "Love Is Like a Butterfly"
- Country of origin: United Kingdom
- Original language: English
- No. of series: 4
- No. of episodes: 30 (including 2 shorts)

Production
- Producers: Gareth Gwenlan (1978–79); Sydney Lotterby (1980–83)
- Production locations: Cheltenham, Gloucestershire, England
- Running time: 30 minutes

Original release
- Network: BBC2
- Release: 10 November 1978 – 19 October 1983

Butterflies is a British sitcom written by Carla Lane that aired in the 9 pm timeslot on BBC2 from 10 November 1978 to 19 October 1983, with each series repeated on BBC1 a few months after the original transmissions.

The subject, the day-to-day life of the comfortable middle-class Parkinson family, is treated in a bittersweet style. There are traditional comedy themes (such as Ria's terrible cooking, and various family squabbles) as well as other more serious themes such as Ria's unconsummated relationship with the outwardly-successful Leonard. Ria is still in love with her husband, Ben, and has raised two teenage sons, yet finds herself unhappy and dissatisfied with her life and in need of something more. Throughout the series, Ria searches for that "something more", and finds some solace in her unconventional friendship with Leonard. In a 2002 interview, Carla Lane explained, "I wanted to write a comedy about a woman seriously contemplating adultery."

In the first episode, an expository discussion between Ria and Leonard alludes to the significance of the series' title: "We are all kids chasing butterflies. You see it, you want it, you grab it, and there it is, all squashed in your hand." She adds, "I am one of the few lucky ones, I have a pleasant house, a pleasant man and two pleasant sons. My butterfly didn't get squashed." Ria's husband Ben collects and studies butterflies.

== Cast and setting ==
Wendy Craig and Geoffrey Palmer, pictured on Butterflies Region 1 DVD cover

The show stars Wendy Craig as Ria Parkinson, a frustrated 'stay-at-home' housewife, and Geoffrey Palmer as her reserved and hard-working dentist husband, Ben, who is also an amateur lepidopterist. Ria's early dialogue in the first series suggests her age as early 40s, whereas her husband, Ben, describes himself as "the wrong side of 45". Ben is a typically traditional, conservative white-collar professional, ill-at-ease with his sons' lack of work ethic and carefree, rebellious attitudes whilst remaining unaware of his wife's impending midlife crisis. They have been married for 19 years and are depicted as having a comfortable lifestyle, supported by one breadwinner in the household at a time in British history when 'stay-at-home' housewives were becoming less common. Ria's disastrous attempts at cooking are a recurring gag.

The Parkinsons have two teenaged sons, both of driving age (at least 17 years of age under UK law in 1978) and unemployed (in 1978, youth unemployment was increasing). Their younger son Adam is played by Nicholas Lyndhurst, and their elder son Russell by Andrew Hall. Throughout all four series, there is a continuing subplot running in tandem with the main storyline, tracking the difficulties faced by young adolescent men coming of age in the UK at a time when there were relatively few employment opportunities. Both of the Parkinson sons are seen making fun of their father's traditional post-war reserved British attitude, whilst also facing their own issues such as unemployment, girlfriend troubles, the illegal use of cannabis against the wishes of their horrified father, and teenage pregnancy, when Russell fathers a child with his on-off girlfriend. Bruce Montague plays Ria's friend Leonard, a successful businessman aged 44, whose wife has recently left him; he, like Ria, is approaching a midlife crisis. The show also featured two recurring minor characters: Leonard's chauffeur and confidant Thomas (Michael Ripper) and the Parkinsons' cleaner, Ruby (Joyce Windsor), who often lends Ria an ear.

== Theme song and music ==
The Butterflies theme song, "Love Is Like a Butterfly", is a 1974 single written and originally recorded by American country music artist Dolly Parton. The cover version used at the opening of each episode was recorded for the series by Clare Torry, with a band conducted by BBC TV composer Ronnie Hazlehurst.

The Adagio in G minor attributed to Tomaso Albinoni was used as interlude music in most of the episodes where Ria is reflecting on her dilemma, and walking through a park on her own. It is a bittersweet twist on two partners, once very much in love, whose marriage is actually breaking down, but this is not recognised by the husband who is totally engrossed in his work and profession.

Ria starts a romance with another man, which is initially seen by the viewer as a virtual image (almost like a thought bubble in a cartoon) as she walks through the park. He later turns out to be real. The Adagio is used as a "filler" for the lack of script.

== Continuity ==
The Parkinsons' address is confirmed as 11 Jade Road in the season 3 episode "Gimme Shelter". However, this had changed to 27 Jade Road by the season 4 episode "Cleaning Windows".

== Filming locations ==
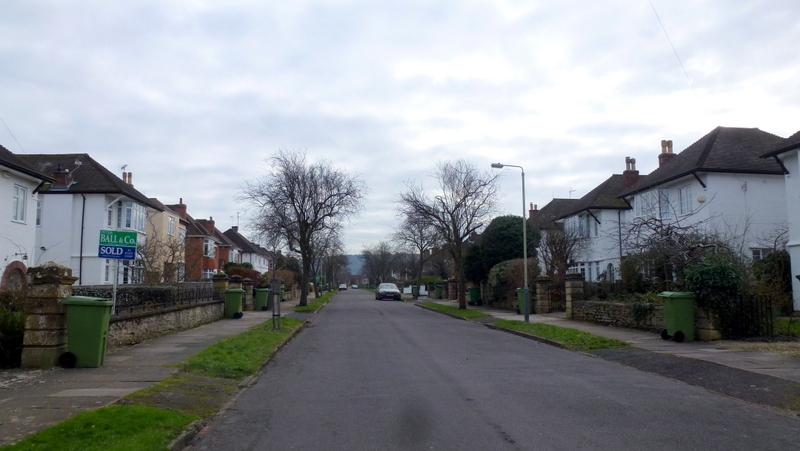
Bournside Road, Cheltenham

Butterflies is set in the prosperous town of Cheltenham, Gloucestershire. (Ben refers to this in the final episode, "Loose Ends". Although the Parkinsons live in Jade Road, this is a fictitious address, actually filmed at 30 Bournside Road.) Many of the exterior scenes were filmed in Cheltenham, including the High Street, Montpellier and Hatherley Park. Exterior shots for the Parkinson house were filmed at 30 Bournside Road in Up Hatherley, Cheltenham. Locations included properties along Bournside Road, Lansdown Road and Christchurch Road in Cheltenham, and that town's Hatherley Park, Pittville Park, Imperial Gardens and Neptune's Fountain; High Street; The Promenade, Montpellier; Peter's Bar, 23 Montpellier Walk, which later became J.J. O'Neill's; and Presto supermarket, Grosvenor Terrace, which later became Bannatyne's Health and Fitness. The apparent office block that could often be seen behind the Parkinson's house at 30 Bournside Road was, in fact, the rear of the catering block of the then North Gloucestershire College of Technology in The Park, Cheltenham, and is now a housing estate. Some external shots were filmed outside Cheltenham and surrounds; the railway station in "An attractive visitor" was Moreton-in-Marsh.

== Episodes ==
The series comprises twenty-eight episodes.

=== Series 1 (1978) ===
No. overall	No. in series	Title	Directed by	Written by	Original release date
1	1	"When Ria Met Leonard"	Unknown	Carla Lane	10 November 1978
After 19 years of marriage, forty-something housewife Ria Parkinson is bored with her life. Her 47-year-old husband Ben, a dentist, has not been on speaking terms with their eldest son Russell for almost a year and Ria has been acting as intermediary. Their younger son Adam has crashed his car again. Later, Ria shares a table with handsome stranger in a local restaurant called Leonard Dunn whose wife has left him for his best friend. She bumps into him again when she is nearly knocked down by Leonard whilst walking home daydreaming. He drives her home and invites her to lunch the next day.
2	2	"Breaking the Silence"	Unknown	Carla Lane	17 November 1978
Ben and Russell reconcile in an effort to support Ria, whose hopeless cooking skills are the subject of both ridicule and self-loathing. Leonard spots Ria in her distinctive red Mini and extends the offer of lunch once again to which she finds herself attending despite her initial reluctance.
3	3	"Thinking About a Job"	Unknown	Carla Lane	24 November 1978
Leonard tows Ria's Mini home after it breaks down, but is subsequently pulled over by a policeman for speeding and banned from driving. Ria feels like a caged bird by her hum-drum existence. The solution according to her sons is to get a job in order to spread her wings. When Ria floats the idea with Ben, he flat out refuses to allow his wife to go out to work. Despite this Ria rings a local firm to apply for the position of chauffeur, unaware it is for Leonard. He in turn rebuffs the idea of a female driver, unaware the applicant is none other than Ria.
4	4	"How About Lunch?"	Unknown	Carla Lane	1 December 1978
Thomas, Leonard's new chauffeur is despatched to invite Ria to lunch on the occasion of his 45th birthday. When the attempt fails, Leonard tries to call her on the phone, but is again unsuccessful. He then asks Ria's bakery to deliver the invitation with her weekly bread order. On receipt, Ria loses the note before she has the chance to read it as Ben whisks her off on an impromptu date.
5	5	"The Lovers"	Unknown	Carla Lane	8 December 1978
Ben and Russell are at odds once again. Ria is accosted by Leonard in the park and an argument ensues. When a statue in the local museum called The Lovers is threatened with sale and export to America, Russell chains himself naked to the work of art in protest. After some reflection Ria joins him, much to Ben's consternation. When Leonard learns of the incident from the local newspaper he purchases the statue.
6	6	"He'll Have to Go"	Unknown	Carla Lane	15 December 1978
Ria is struck by the poignancy of a memorial stone in a local churchyard and enters the church to talk to god. Leonard who has followed her enters the church to talk to her. She resolves to remove anything superfluous from her life, starting with the teapot. Ria meets Leonard for lunch and reveals he is on the condemned list too. Ben receives marital advice from a patient and puts the theory into action. Adam has his hair permed and hides it from his father by donning a crash helmet.

=== Series 2 (1979) ===
No. overall	No. in series	Title	Directed by	Written by	Original release date
7	1	"Leaving"	John B. Hobbs	Carla Lane	29 October 1979
Ria attempts to console Adam after his girlfriend Annie dumps him for being boring. Having failed, she despatches Ben to have a word with him man to man. Leonard sees Ria in the park whilst out jogging and advises her to confide in trees. When Adam leaves home with Ben's car, Ria fears the worst. Upon his return 48 hours later Ben's initial joy at seeing his son back, is dampened when he learns his car has been crashed.
8	2	"Fox Hunting"	John B. Hobbs	Carla Lane	5 November 1979
During a butterfly hunt in the countryside with Ben, Ria's picnic is interrupted by a fox hunt. Appalled, she resolves to do something about it. Ria starts a campaign in town and hands out flyers inviting the gathered onlookers to a protest where she intends to disrupt the next hunt meeting. Despite the enthusiasm of the massed crowd, only Leonard and a homeless man turn up on the day.
9	3	"Worrying"	John B. Hobbs	Carla Lane	12 November 1979
Ben thinks he is having a heart attack after a heated confrontation with his sons about a missing screwdriver. Leonard crosses paths with Ria at a hair salon and during a shopping trip. Ben's doctor friend tells him he has nothing to worry about but should be exercising regularly. Relieved at the removal of the Damoclean Sword hanging over him, he turns over a new leaf and displays a new generous nature.
10	4	"A Dog's Life"	John B. Hobbs	Carla Lane	19 November 1979
Russell and Adam fall foul of the new neighbours, the Conrads, when their frisbee lands in the Conrad's car. Ria seeks solace in the local church, but find herself telling god off and leaves when she sees Mrs Conrad arrive. On the way home a collie dives out in front of the mini and she tells the dog off. Later, at the doctor's Ria is diagnosed with nervous exhaustion and again spots Mrs Conrad in the waiting room just as she is leaving. When Ria sees Mrs Conrad in the park, she confronts her and learns that her neighbour is bereft at not having children.
11	5	"Keeping Fit"	John B. Hobbs	Carla Lane	26 November 1979
Ria attends a keep fit class. On the way home she is offered a lift by Thomas, only to discover Leonard in the back of the car in a poorly state. When she doesn't cross paths with him in all the regular places for a few days, Ria rings his office only to discover he is still off ill. She takes a handmade card made with pressed flowers to him at his flat and finds him bedridden and feeling down. Her visit cheers him up.
12	6	"An Attractive Visitor"	John B. Hobbs	Carla Lane	3 December 1979
Ria receives a somewhat unwelcome houseguest in the shape of a very glamorous woman called Susanna, who she and Ben met whilst on holiday in Portugal the previous year. When Susanna spends the day with Leonard at her suggestion, Ria ends up feeling confused and slightly jealous. Meanwhile, Ben receives some more marital wisdom from his patient.
13	7	"Lunch with Leonard"	John B. Hobbs	Carla Lane	10 December 1979
Leonard asks Ria to meet him urgently for lunch and takes her on a trip down memory lane and the places they both frequent, culminating in lunch at his flat and the revelation that his ex-wife is returning. That evening Ria refuses to cook dinner, but is pleasantly surprised when Ben reveals he has booked a table at a restaurant anyway.
14	8	"Christmas with the Parkinsons"	John B. Hobbs	Carla Lane	22 December 1979

=== Series 3 (1980) ===
Series	Year	Episodes
3	1980	1. "An Empty Cage": Adam starts work as a lorry driver 2. "Ruby's Crisis": Ruby fights an urge to shoplift 3. "Pregnancy": Russell finds out his girlfriend Jeannie is pregnant, and tells his family 4. "Problems, Problems": The Parkinsons all have problems 5. "Happy Birthday, Ria": Ria takes a day trip to London; 6. "Gimme Shelter": A friend of Ria's visits, but their conversation goes badly 7. "Parting": Leonard is going to New York and invites Ria to his flat before he goes

=== Series 4 (1983) ===
Series	Year	Episodes
4	1983	1. "Back from New York": Ria receives a letter from Leonard, then loses it 2. "Amanda": An ex of Ben's visits 3. "Pot": Ria and Ben return from their trip to Paris; 4. "Cleaning Windows": Russell and Adam become window cleaners 5. "Calling": Jeannie tells Russell that she wants to be a single mother 6. "Breaking Up": Ria decides to end her friendship with Leonard; 7. "Loose Ends": Leonard still wants an affair with Ria, but she decides against it

=== Christmas sketch (1982) ===
An eight-and-a-half-minute sketch aired as part of a Christmas special called The Funny Side of Christmas on BBC1 on 27 December 1982. The family are happy for a seasonal excuse to avoid eating Ria's food. She reveals to Adam privately that Leonard has gone to New York, but he is instead outside in his car, until Thomas reminds him that his former wife is waiting for him at home. Leonard calls Ria on the home phone and Russell answers. Asking for Ria, Leonard is told that Ria is kissing Ben under the mistletoe. When Ria gets to the phone, Leonard hears her voice and hangs up without speaking.

=== Special for Children in Need (2000) ===
In November 2000, the cast (except for Michael Ripper who had recently died) reunited for a 13-minute episode in aid of Children in Need. The premise is Ria's 60th birthday and the lack of change to her situation. Her son Adam is married and has a primary-school-aged daughter named Sophie. Russell however, has no interest in settling down.

=== American series pilot (1979) ===
An American remake was piloted but never commissioned. NBC broadcast the pilot in August 1979, with little change to the original scripting. It starred Jennifer Warren as Ria Parkinson and John McMartin as her husband, Ben Parkinson. Film actor Jim Hutton was featured as Leonard Dean in this version.

It was Hutton's final acting job. He died suddenly from liver cancer at the age of 45 in June 1979, several weeks before the pilot aired. The pilot aired alongside three other sitcom pilots under the umbrella title "Battle of the Sexes".

== DVD release ==
All episodes of Butterflies are available on DVD in the UK, distributed by Acorn Media UK. Only the first two series are available in the US.

== Accolades ==
The show received a BAFTA nomination for Best Television Comedy Series in 1981.

== See also ==
British sitcom
