= Third Time Lucky (TV series) =

1982 British TV comedy series

- Genre: Sitcom
- Written by: Jan Butlin
- Directed by: Graeme Muir
- Starring: Derek Nimmo; Nerys Hughes
- Composer: Peter Skellern
- Country of origin: United Kingdom
- Original language: English
- No. of series: 1
- No. of episodes: 7

Production
- Producer: Graeme Muir
- Running time: 30 minutes
- Production company: Yorkshire Television

Original release
- Network: ITV
- Release: 6 August – 17 September 1982

Third Time Lucky is a British comedy television series that originally aired on ITV in 1982. A man meets his divorced first wife, and rekindles his romance with her.

== Main cast ==
- Derek Nimmo as George Hutchenson
- Nerys Hughes as Beth Jenkins
- Debbie Farrington as Clare Hutchenson
- Lorraine Brunning as Jenny Hutchenson
- Clifford Earl as Bruce Jenkins
- Angela Douglas as Millie King
- Angela Piper as Sally Jenkins
- Gerald Flood as Henry King
- Robert Craig-Morgan as Peter
- Nigel Greaves as Christopher Tracy

== Episodes ==
No.	Title	Directed by	Written by	Original release date
1	"Change Partners"	Graeme Muir	Jan Butlin	6 August 1982
2	"It Isn't Easy Being a Father"	Graeme Muir	Jan Butlin	13 August 1982
3	"Some Girls Do"	Graeme Muir	Jan Butlin	20 August 1982
4	"All in a Day's Work"	Graeme Muir	Jan Butlin	27 August 1982
5	"Trial Run"	Graeme Muir	Jan Butlin	3 September 1982
6	"Don't Talk to Me About Love"	Graeme Muir	Jan Butlin	10 September 1982
7	"Let Them Eat Cake"	Graeme Muir	Jan Butlin	17 September 1982
