= Polly James =

British actress

- Born: Pauline Devaney; 8 July 1941 (age 85); Blackburn, Lancashire, England
- Education: Royal Academy of Dramatic Art
- Occupation: Actress
- Years active: 1966–2001
- Spouse: Clive Francis (divorced)

Pauline James (formerly Devaney; born 8 July 1941) is an English former actress who had a career in theatre, film, television, and radio.

== Early life ==
Pauline James was born in Blackburn, Lancashire, as Pauline Devaney. Her father had managed a cotton mill in Nelson while her parents lived in Oswaldtwistle. She was a pupil at St Peter’s School in Mill Hill, then at the Convent of Notre Dame Grammar School for Girls in Blackburn. Afterward, she was awarded a scholarship to study at the Royal Academy of Dramatic Art (RADA).

== Career ==
After graduating from RADA, James began her TV career in BBC2's Thirty-Minute Theatre, followed by the role of a drug addict in Z-Cars in 1967. She played Audrey Hargreaves in Coronation Street in 1967.

She is best known for her role as Beryl Hennessey in the first four series of the British sitcom The Liver Birds (1969–74), mostly alongside Nerys Hughes. She played Cicely Courtneidge in the biographical musical of the actress Once More with Music in 1976, and appeared as a soubrette in Alan Clarke's 1982 production of Baal. She played the role of Jane Hampden on "The Awakening" episode of Doctor Who in 1984. She appeared in the West End musicals I and Albert and Anne of Green Gables. In 1971, James appeared with the Royal Shakespeare Company in The Merchant of Venice with Judi Dench.

James appeared as Jenny Wren in the 1976 BBC adaptation of Dickens's Our Mutual Friend.

== Personal life ==
James is divorced.

== Television roles ==
| Year | Title | Role |
|---|---|---|
| 1966 and 1967 | Thirty-Minute Theatre - "The Spoken Word" | Doreen Pimblett |
| 1967 | Z-Cars | Sylvia Weeks |
| 1967 | Coronation Street | Audrey Hargreaves |
| 1969 to 1974 | The Liver Birds | Beryl Hennessey |
| 1976 | Our Mutual Friend | Jenny Wren |
| 1976 | A Divorce | Gemma |
| 1984 | Doctor Who | Jane Hampden |
| 1991 | Casualty | Sylvia Vaughan |
| 1996 | The Liver Birds | Beryl Fenning, née Hennessey |
| 2000 to 2001 | The Worst Witch | Miss Lavinia Crotchet |
