= Nerys Hughes =

Welsh actress and narrator (born 1941)

- Born: 8 November 1941 (age 84); Rhyl, Flintshire, Wales
- Education: Rose Bruford College
- Years active: 1963–present
- Spouse: Patrick Turley (m. 1972)
- Children: 2

Nerys Hughes (born 8 November 1941) is a Welsh actress and narrator, known primarily for her television roles, including her parts in the BBC TV series The Liver Birds (1971–1978) and The District Nurse (1984–1987).

== Early life and education ==
Nerys Hughes was born in Rhyl, Denbighshire. Her parents were Myfi and Ted Kerfoot-Hughes, who raised her as a Methodist. She attended Howell's School in Denbigh, where she took an interest in drama. Her first language was Welsh, although she said in 2009 that by then she had lost some competence. She studied drama at Rose Bruford College and in 1960 joined the Radio Drama Company by winning the Carleton Hobbs Bursary.

== Career ==
One of Hughes's early dramatic roles was in Ken Loach's television series titled Diary of a Young Man in 1964. She is best known for the role of Sandra Hutchinson, co-starring alongside Mollie Sugden and Polly James in the BBC TV series The Liver Birds (1971–1979, and 1996).

She later played the eponymous lead in The District Nurse, a series that was written for her, and won the Variety Club Television Actress of the Year Award. The series was released on DVD in 2006.

She appeared in the films A Severed Head and Take a Girl Like You, both in 1970.

In theatre, she has appeared in A Midsummer Night's Dream (1962–1963), Cymbeline (1962–1963), The Comedy of Errors (1962) and Doctor Faustus (1962) with the Royal Shakespeare Company. Other productions include The Mating Game (1971), Jack and the Beanstalk (1979–1980), and Under Milk Wood (1995).

Hughes was one of the explorers who voyaged to the planet Arg in the (now lost from the BBC) fourth episode of the second series of the "science-fiction" quiz The Adventure Game in 1981, where she was evaporated in the Vortex game. She also guest-starred in the metaphorical and esoteric Doctor Who story Kinda (1982) as the scientist Todd, alongside actors Peter Davison, Richard Todd and Simon Rouse. She also appeared in the Torchwood episode "Something Borrowed" as Brenda Williams (Rhys's mother), and an alien. She is also known for her role as Glenda in The Queen's Nose (1998–2000). Hughes later returned to Doctor Who through Big Finish Productions audio dramas as the Fourth Doctor's companion Margaret Hopwood.

== Personal life ==
Hughes is married to television cameraman Patrick Turley, and has a son and a daughter.

== In popular culture ==
Half Man Half Biscuit released the song "I Hate Nerys Hughes (From the Heart)" on the album Back in the DHSS.

== Television roles ==
=== Comedy ===
Year	Title	Role
1966	The Likely Lads	Valerie
1967	Further Adventures of Lucky Jim	
1969	The Valley Express	Jenny
1972	The Merchant of Venice	Nerissa
1971–1979, 1996	The Liver Birds	Sandra Hutchinson
1982	Third Time Lucky	Beth Jenkins
1989	A Night of Comic Relief 2	Herself

=== Drama ===
Year	Title	Role
1963	Dixon of Dock Green	Beryl
1963	Z-Cars	Molly Roberts
1967	Mr. Rose: "The Black Beast"	Heather
1970	Manhunt	Francine
1975–1976	How Green Was My Valley	Bronwen Morgan
1982	Doctor Who: "Kinda"	Todd
1984–1987	The District Nurse	Megan Roberts
1998	The Queen's Nose	Glenda
2008	Torchwood: "Something Borrowed"	Brenda Williams

=== Appearances ===
Year	Title	Role
1981	The Adventure Game	Explorer
1984	This Is Your Life	Subject
1989	Fun with ABC	Presenter
