= I Didn't Know You Cared =

British TV sitcom (BBC1, 1975–79)

- Genre: Sitcom
- Created by: Peter Tinniswood
- Starring: Robin Bailey; John Comer; Liz Smith; Stephen Rea; Anita Carey; Deirdre Costello; Keith Drinkel
- Country of origin: United Kingdom
- Original language: English
- No. of series: 4
- No. of episodes: 27

Production
- Producer: Bernard Thompson
- Running time: 30 minutes
- Production company: BBC

Original release
- Network: BBC1
- Release: 27 August 1975 – 26 June 1979

I Didn't Know You Cared is a British television comedy set in a working-class household in South Yorkshire in the 1970s, written by Peter Tinniswood, loosely based upon his books A Touch of Daniel, I Didn't Know You Cared, and Except You're a Bird. It was broadcast by the BBC in four series (seven episodes each in series 1, 3, and 4 and six in series 2) from 1975 to 1979.

The main characters are: Carter Brandon (played by Stephen Rea and, in series 3 and 4, Keith Drinkel); his Uncle Mort (Robin Bailey); his mother Annie (Liz Smith); his father Les (John Comer); his girlfriend (later wife) Pat Partington (Anita Carey and, in series 3 and 4, Liz Goulding); and his other uncle, Uncle Staveley (Bert Palmer and, in series 4, Leslie Sarony). Auntie Lil (Gretchen Franklin), appears in the first two series. Other recurring characters, mostly from Carter's workplace, are: Linda Preston (Deirdre Costello); Mrs Partington, Pat's mother (Vanda Godsell); Sid Skelhorn (Ray Dunbobbin and, in series 3 and 4, Bobby Pattinson); and Louis St. John (Paul Barber).

The novels narrate the story of which Carter's thoughts are an integral part. A recurring theme in the books is conversation between Carter and baby Daniel (Uncle Mort's son). One feature of the books is a line at the top of each page which summarises the developments on that page. The TV series adhere more closely to the conventions of situation comedy, and present generally light-hearted versions of the stories from the books.

In the TV series, Uncle Staveley (remembered for his catchphrase, "I heard that! Pardon?") always appears with the ashes of Corporal Parkinson—one of his comrades from World War I—in a box around his neck.

Peter Tinniswood wrote five further series for BBC Radio 4 featuring members of the Brandon family between 1987 and 1996; two five-episode series each of Uncle Mort's North Country & Uncle Mort's South Country and a five-episode series of Uncle Mort's Celtic Fringe. In these series, Stephen Thorne played Uncle Mort, with Peter Skellern as Carter Brandon (Sam Kelly replaced Skellern in South Country and Uncle Mort's Celtic Fringe).

== Episodes ==
=== Series 1 (1975) ===
No. overall	No. in season	Title	Original release date
1	1	"Cause For Celebration"	27 August 1975
2	2	"A Knitter in the Family"	3 September 1975
3	3	"The Old Tin Trunk"	10 September 1975
4	4	"After the Ball Was Over"	17 September 1975
5	5	"Aye... Well... Mm..."	24 September 1975
6	6	"Large or Small, Big or Tall"	1 October 1975
7	7	"The Axe and Cleaver"	15 October 1975

=== Series 2 (1976) ===
No. overall	No. in season	Title	Original release date
8	1	"The Way My Wife Looks at Me"	20 April 1976
9	2	"Chez Us"	27 April 1976
10	3	"A Woman's Work"	4 May 1976
11	4	"A Signal Disaster"	11 May 1976
12	5	"You Should See Me Now"	18 May 1976
13	6	"Good Wood, God!"	25 May 1976

=== Series 3 (1978) ===
No. overall	No. in season	Title	Original release date
14	1	"Men at Work"	11 January 1978
15	2	"A Grave Decision"	18 January 1978
16	3	"Party Games"	25 January 1978
17	4	"A Bleak Day"	1 February 1978
18	5	"Stout Deeds"	8 February 1978
19	6	"Paradise Lost"	15 February 1978
20	7	"The Last Tram"	22 February 1978

=== Series 4 (1979) ===
No. overall	No. in season	Title	Original release date
21	1	"The Love Match"	8 May 1979
22	2	"Love is a Many Splendoured Thing"	15 May 1979
23	3	"A Tip Top Day"	22 May 1979
24	4	"Don't Answer That"	29 May 1979
25	5	"The Great Escape"	5 June 1979
26	6	"What's in a Name?"	19 June 1979
27	7	"The Great Day"	26 June 1979
