= Myra Taylor (scriptwriter) =

British TV scriptwriter (1934–2012)

Myra Taylor (1934 – 22 March 2012) was a British television scriptwriter. Although her writing career was not particularly extensive, she did play a significant role in two of the more popular British TV comedies of the 1970s.

Taylor was born as Myra Green in Liverpool in early 1934. She married Harold Taylor in 1954 in Liverpool. She jointly-created The Liver Birds with Carla Lane (whom she met at a writers' club), although she only wrote a few of the early episodes before going her own way at the end of the second series. She was one of a team of scriptwriters on Bless This House and wrote her own short lived series Divided We Stand (1987).

Taylor and Lane would often meet at the Adelphi Hotel in Liverpool to write together.

She died in March 2012 at the age of 78.
