= Sunderland Empire Theatre =

Theatre in Sunderland, North East England

- Empire Palace
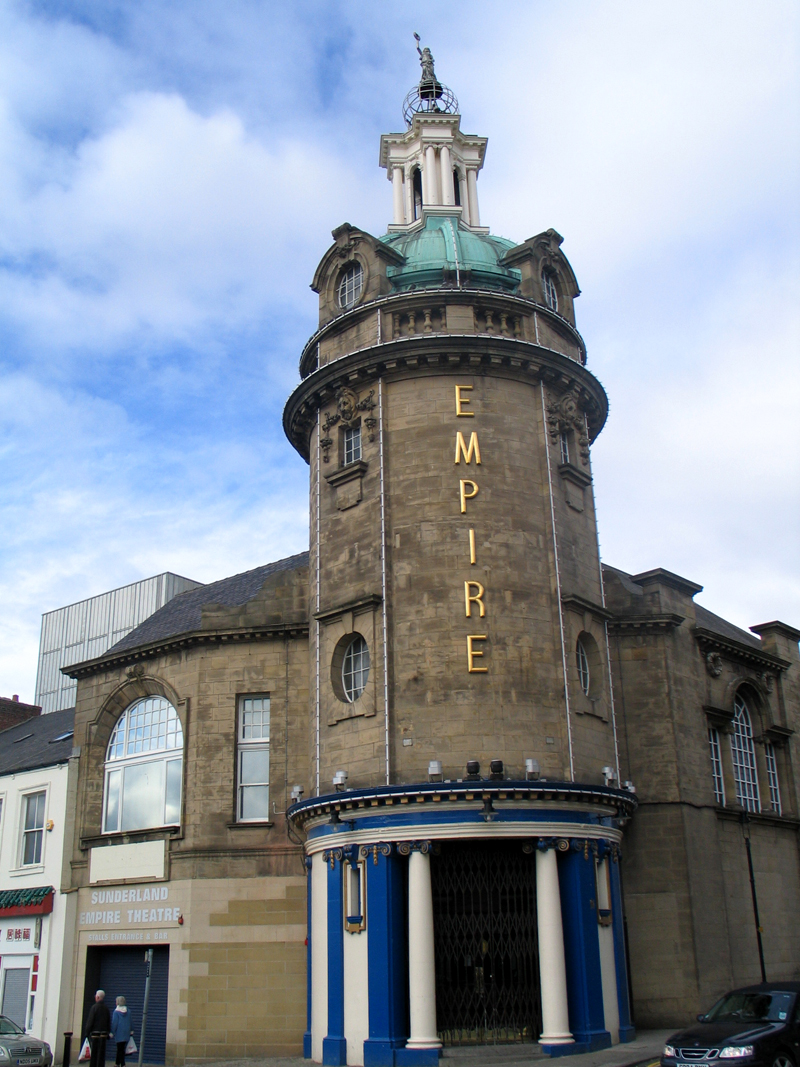
- Shown here are the Main Doors, with the secondary Stalls entrance to the left. The Box Office is located 20 yards down the street.
- Interactive map of Sunderland Empire Theatre
- Address: High Street West; Sunderland; United Kingdom
- Coordinates: 54.90638°N 1.3892°W
- Owner: Leased by Ambassador Theatre Group (City of Sunderland Council)
- Capacity: 2,000
- Type: Major regional theatre

Construction
- Opened: 1 July 1907

Website
- Sunderland Empire Theatre website at Ambassador Theatre Group

The Sunderland Empire Theatre is a large theatre venue located in High Street West in Sunderland, North East England. The theatre, which opened in 1907, is owned by City of Sunderland Council and operated by Ambassador Theatre Group Ltd, on behalf of Sunderland Empire Theatre Trust.

The theatre is one of the largest venues in the North East, with 1,860 seats and the capacity to accommodate 2,200 when all standing positions are occupied. The auditorium is also one of the few remaining in the UK to have four tiers, namely the Orchestra Stalls, the Dress Circle, the Upper Circle and the Gallery. There are four private boxes on the Dress Circle level, as well as two proscenium boxes on the Upper Circle balcony.

== History ==
The Empire Palace, as it was originally called, was established independently by Richard Thornton after his partnership with theatre magnate Edward Moss was dissolved. It was opened on 1 July 1907 by variety and vaudeville star Vesta Tilley, who had laid the foundation stone on 29 September 1906.

The dome on the 90 ft tower featured a revolving sphere bearing the statue of Terpsichore, the Greek Muse of dance and choral song. These were removed during World War II for safety reasons, after a bomb which had fallen nearby rocked the building. The original statue is now located at the top of the main staircase, with a replica on the dome itself. The dome and tower have recently been refitted with a state-of-the-art LED and floodlight system that illuminates the main entrance in the evening.

Until the mid-twenties, the Empire enjoyed much extended success from its variety performances. With the decline of touring theatre, a projection box was added in 1930 and for the first time, the theatre played host to motion pictures. On 5 November 1956 Tommy Steele made his stage debut heading the bill in a variety show. Steele, Britain's first rock 'n' roll singer, went on to become one of the world's leading song and dance men appearing at the Empire many times. Although audience figures were high during the 1940s and early 1950s, the theatre closed in May 1959 due to the growing popularity of television and cinema. It reopened in 1960, however, after Sunderland Council bought the theatre. The Beatles performed there during their first UK national tour.

The actor Sid James, best known for his roles in Carry On films and Bless This House suffered a heart attack during a performance of The Mating Season on 26 April 1976 and died on the way to hospital. Later it was rumoured that his ghost was in the dressing room he occupied on the night of his death; after one experience during a gig there, the comedian Les Dawson refused to play the venue again. Whilst the ghost of James is said to haunt backstage, the spirits of Vesta Tilley and Molly Moselle are said to haunt the front-of-house areas. Molly Moselle was a stage manager for Ivor Novello's The Dancing Years in 1949. Leaving the theatre to post a letter, she disappeared down a nearby alley and was never seen again. The Empire was known as a 'comic graveyard' – rather unfortunately given the above points – because of the partisan reception of the audiences of the time. Nowadays, the theatre regularly plays host to large-scale musicals, opera, ballet, dance showcases, amateur productions and one-night shows.

Oscar-winning actress Helen Mirren made her stage debut at the Sunderland Empire.

The theatre was the regular venue for the University of Sunderland's graduation ceremonies until the theatre's refurbishment in 2004. Since this time, the graduation ceremonies have been held at Sunderland AFC's Stadium of Light.

Birmingham Royal Ballet frequently visits the Sunderland Empire, and BRB considers the theatre as its base in the North East of England.

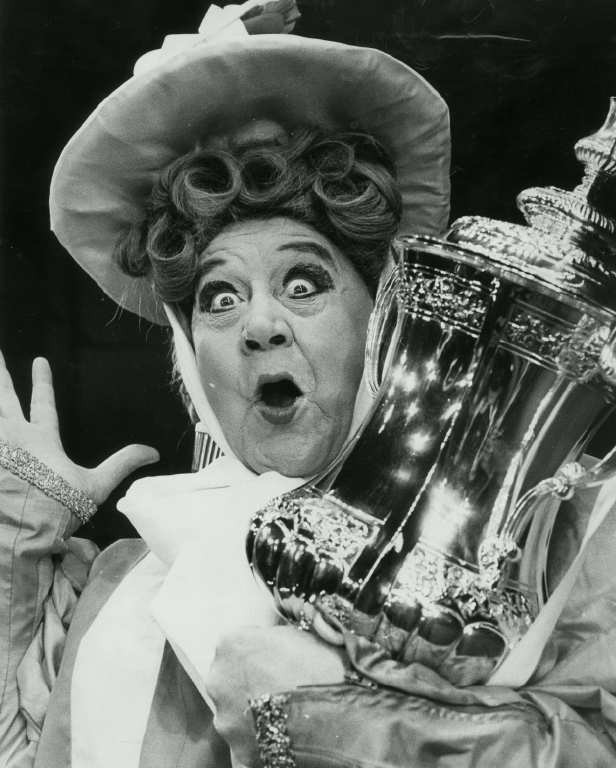
Reggie Dixon in pantomime at the Empire Theatre in 1973/1974 with the FA Cup, which Sunderland AFC had won the previous summer

== 2004 refurbishment and subsequent shows ==
Following a nine-month closure for a £4.5m redevelopment project to enable it to stage West End shows, the theatre reopened on 9 December 2004 with a performance of Starlight Express. This refurbishment involved expanding the stage and the height of the fly tower. The refurbishment also allowed a new production of Miss Saigon to be staged at Sunderland in early 2005. On 9 December 2005, the Sunderland Empire staged a preview performance of the first ever touring production of Chitty Chitty Bang Bang, starring Tim Flavin and Robin Askwith. The official European premiere of this production took place there on 13 December.

On 2 May 2006, a new touring production of My Fair Lady began its run, starring Christopher Cazenove and Amy Nuttall. Scrooge: The Musical played at the Sunderland Empire over the 2006 Christmas period, starring comedian and television personality Michael Barrymore in the title role. 2007 saw the Sunderland Empire celebrate its centenary and a massive line-up of big shows including Starlight Express, The Producers, Footloose, South Pacific and the first pantomime since its refurbishment – Cinderella which starred Hollywood actor Mickey Rooney.

The theatre now is a receiving house for large-scale touring productions such as Wicked, Matilda the Musical, War Horse and Miss Saigon. Most of these tours play the Empire over the Newcastle Theatre Royal due to their staging being too large to fit onto the stage of the latter venue.
