= Bless This House (British TV series) =

British TV sitcom (1971–1976)

- Titles used in the first three series
- Genre: Sitcom
- Created by: Vince Powell; Harry Driver
- Starring: Sid James; Diana Coupland; Robin Stewart; Sally Geeson; Anthony Jackson; Patsy Rowlands
- Theme music composer: Geoff Love
- Country of origin: United Kingdom
- Original language: English
- No. of series: 6
- No. of episodes: 65 (list of episodes)

Production
- Producer: William G. Stewart
- Running time: 30 minutes
- Production company: Thames Television

Original release
- Network: ITV
- Release: 2 February 1971 – 22 April 1976

Bless This House is a British sitcom that aired on ITV from 2 February 1971 to 22 April 1976, with a total of 65 episodes. Starring Sid James and Diana Coupland, it was created by Vince Powell and Harry Driver, but mainly written by other hands including Dave Freeman and Carla Lane. It was made for the ITV network by Thames Television. In 2004, Bless This House was ranked by a BBC poll as the 67th Best British Sitcom.

== Synopsis ==
Bless This House centres on life in Howard Road, New Malden, where travelling stationery salesman Sid Abbott (Note: the spelling of their surname varies; the opening credits of early series one episodes spell it "Abbot" while in the closing credits it is spelt "Abbott) and his wife Jean live with their teenagers: Mike is fresh from art college and more pre-occupied with protests than finding a job; and trendy schoolgirl Sally. Mike is 18 and Sally is 16, at the series' start. Sid and Jean constantly battle to comprehend the new generation's permissive ways and are usually out-of-touch. Their neighbours and best friends are Trevor Lewis and his wife Betty.

== Cast ==
- Sidney James as Sid Abbott. Jean Abbott's husband and an Arsenal F.C. fan. He likes to believe he is in control of his household, but finds he has to sneak out to go to the football or the public house. He often tries to avoid occasions he doesn't want to attend, but this often backfires on him.
- Diana Coupland as Jean Abbott. Sid's wife, who believes she can talk him into or out of anything. She always knows what he's up to and sees through his schemes.
- Robin Stewart as Mike Abbott. Jean and Sid's son, their firstborn. He is an artist but he always avoids employment because "it's a drag."
- Sally Geeson as Sally Abbott. Jean and Sid's daughter, Mike's little sister. Sid and Jean constantly worry about her relationships with "boys." She calls Sid "Daddy" and Jean "Mummy." (Sally Geeson married Bless This House producer William G. Stewart in 1976 and had two children during their 10 years of marriage.)
- Anthony Jackson as Trevor Lewis. The Abbotts' next-door neighbour and Sid's best friend.
- Patsy Rowlands as Betty Lewis. Trevor's wife and Jean's best friend. Jean and Betty usually gang up on their husbands if they don't do the right things.

== Production ==
The show was produced and directed by William G. Stewart, later the host of Channel 4's 15 to 1 game show, and had theme music written by Geoff Love. A comic strip version was also produced, written by Angus Allan and printed in TV comic Look-in. The first seven episodes of series one were made in black-and-white due to the ITV colour strike. Every episode was recorded in Studio 1 at Thames Television's Teddington Studios.

The series ended in 1976 after a total of 65 episodes. Four days after the broadcast of the final episode of the sixth series, Sid James collapsed on stage at the Sunderland Empire Theatre during a performance of The Mating Season after failing to respond to a cue. James had suffered a heart attack and later died on the way to the hospital. He was 62 years old.

At the time of James's death, plans were already in place for a seventh and eighth series of the show, and a second feature film but it was eventually cancelled. Ironically, James had told his co-star Diana Coupland, "it's such fun and so successful, we'll still be working on Bless This House till one of us kicks the bucket."

== Episodes ==
Series	Episodes	Originally released	
Series	Episodes	First released	Last released
1	12	2 February 1971	20 April 1971
2	12	21 February 1972	15 May 1972
3	12	22 January 1973	28 May 1973
4	6	20 February 1974	10 April 1974
5	10	14 October 1974	16 December 1974
6	13	29 January 1976	22 April 1976

== Home media ==
=== VHS ===
Title	Release
The Day of Rest / Make Love...Not War	5 October 1987
The Day of Rest / Make Love...Not War (re-release)	1993
Charity Begins at Home / If The Dog Collar Fits...Wear It	11 July 1994
Series 1 – Episodes 8 to 12	8 April 2002

=== DVD ===
Cover of complete third series DVD

The entire series of Bless This House is available on DVD. The first-ever set to appear on Region 2 in the UK was a DVD featuring the first colour episodes of the series from distribution company, Clear Vision. Completed series sets were made available via Network, between 2005 and 2007, followed by a complete series box set in 2007, which was repackaged in 2008 and again in 2009. The sets do not contain special features, aside from the series four set, which contains the Christmas television special, All This, and Christmas Too!, featuring Sid James, broadcast in 1971 and had not been aired since. Both complete series sets feature the 1972 feature film.

In Australia (Region 4), the series was originally released by Umbrella Entertainment, where both the first and second series were made available, each in two parts and are the only DVDs to include special features. The first three complete series were then released between 2009 and 2013. After which, no subsequent series had been released until a complete series set from Roadshow Entertainment in 2013, followed by a reissue from Via Vision Entertainment in 2020. As with the Region 2 complete sets, the Region 4 complete DVD sets contain the feature film.

Overview
Title	Release date		Features	Ref.
Title	Region 2	Region 4	Features	Ref.
Series 1 – Episodes 8 to 12	8 April 2002	—N/a	First episodes in colour	
Complete Series 1, Part 1	—N/a	14 May 2003	Series 1, episodes 1–6; Stereo 1.0; 4:3 aspect ratio; No subtitles; ACB rating: PG; Special features: Original broadcast ad caps; Original "Salute to Thames" openings; Production notes; Photo gallery; Scene selection; Motion menus; Umbrella propaganda	
Complete Series 1, Part 2	—N/a	14 May 2003	Series 1, episodes 7–12; Stereo 1.0; 4:3 aspect ratio; No subtitles; ACB rating: PG; Special features: Original broadcast ad caps; Original "Salute to Thames" openings; Production notes; Photo gallery; Scene selection; Motion menus; Umbrella propaganda	
Complete Series 2, Part 1	—N/a	17 March 2004	Series 2, episodes 1–6; Mono 1.0; 4:3 aspect ratio; No subtitles; ACB rating: PG; Special features: Complete first episode of Two in Clover; Original broadcast ad caps; Original "Salute to Thames" openings; Production notes; Scene selection; Umbrella propaganda	
Complete Series 2, Part 2	—N/a	17 March 2004	Series 2, episodes 7–12; Stereo 1.0; 4:3 aspect ratio; No subtitles; ACB rating: PG; Special features: Complete first episode of Two in Clover; Original broadcast ad caps; Original "Salute to Thames" openings; Production notes; Scene selection; Umbrella propaganda	
The Complete First Series	24 October 2005	2 April 2009	12 episodes; 2 discs; Mono 1.0; 4:3 aspect ratio; No subtitles; BBFC rating: PG; ACB rating: PG; No special features	
The Complete Second Series	30 January 2006	3 October 2012	12 episodes; 2 discs; Mono 1.0; 4:3 aspect ratio; No subtitles; BBFC rating: 12; ACB rating: G; No special features	
The Complete Third Series	17 April 2006	6 March 2013	12 episodes; 2 discs; Mono 1.0; 4:3 aspect ratio; No subtitles; BBFC rating: PG; ACB rating: PG; No special features	
The Complete Fourth Series	10 July 2006	—N/a	6 episodes; 1 disc; Mono 1.0; 4:3 aspect ratio; No subtitles; BBFC rating: PG; Special features: All This, and Christmas Too! – TV special, featuring Sid James (1971)	
The Complete Fifth Series	22 January 2007	—N/a	10 episodes; 2 disc; Mono 1.0; 4:3 aspect ratio; No subtitles; BBFC rating: PG; No special features	
The Complete Sixth Series	30 April 2007	—N/a	13 episodes; 2 disc; Mono 1.0; 4:3 aspect ratio; No subtitles; BBFC rating: PG; No special features	
The Complete Series	22 October 2007	6 November 2013	65 episodes; 12 discs (all Region 2 complete box sets); 11 discs (first Region 4 complete boxset) / 12 discs (reissue Region 4 complete box set); Mono 1.0; 4:3 aspect ratio; No subtitles; BBFC rating: 12; ACB rating: PG; Special features: All This, and Christmas Too! – TV special, featuring Sid James (1971); Bless This House feature film (1972)	
The Complete Series (reissue)	1 September 2008	9 December 2020	65 episodes; 12 discs (all Region 2 complete box sets); 11 discs (first Region 4 complete boxset) / 12 discs (reissue Region 4 complete box set); Mono 1.0; 4:3 aspect ratio; No subtitles; BBFC rating: 12; ACB rating: PG; Special features: All This, and Christmas Too! – TV special, featuring Sid James (1971); Bless This House feature film (1972)	
The Complete Series (reissue)	2 February 2009	9 December 2020	65 episodes; 12 discs (all Region 2 complete box sets); 11 discs (first Region 4 complete boxset) / 12 discs (reissue Region 4 complete box set); Mono 1.0; 4:3 aspect ratio; No subtitles; BBFC rating: 12; ACB rating: PG; Special features: All This, and Christmas Too! – TV special, featuring Sid James (1971); Bless This House feature film (1972)	

ITV3 started repeating the series on 17 June 2020, with minor edits.

== Film ==
A film version of the TV series was made in 1972. While it still starred Diana Coupland and Sid James as the Abbotts, Robin Askwith, who had previously appeared in the TV series, played Mike instead of TV series regular Robin Stewart due to the latter being unable to find time to appear in the film, having already been booked for the summer season on Bournemouth Pier. In addition, it featured "new" neighbours played by Terry Scott and June Whitfield. June later guest starred in an episode of the regular series, although as a different character. The part of Trevor was also recast with Peter Butterworth replacing Jackson. All the original actors returned for series three. Additionally, Mike gets married at the end of the film; this had no effect on the storylines in the television series.

== See also ==
- British sitcom
- List of films based on British television series
