= The District Nurse =

British TV period drama series (1984–1987)

- Genre: Drama
- Created by: Tony Holland; Julia Smith
- Written by: William Ingram; Juliet Ace
- Directed by: Peter Edwards; Mary Ridge
- Starring: Nerys Hughes; John Ogwen; Margaret John; Rio Fanning; Beth Morris
- Composer: David Mindel
- Country of origin: United Kingdom
- Original language: English
- No. of series: 3
- No. of episodes: 36

Production
- Executive producer: Julia Smith
- Producer: Brian Spiby
- Editor: John Beattie
- Running time: 30 min (24 episodes); 50 min (12 episodes)
- Production company: BBC Wales

Original release
- Network: BBC1
- Release: 10 January 1984 – 24 May 1987

The District Nurse is a television series produced by BBC Wales and shown on BBC One between 1984 and 1987.

The series was a period drama created by Julia Smith and Tony Holland (who both went on to create EastEnders) and starred Nerys Hughes as Megan Roberts, the titular district nurse fighting to improve living conditions for the people living in a fictional poverty-stricken mining town, Pencwm, in south Wales during the late 1920s. The school scenes were filmed at Pont-y-Gof school in Ebbw Vale, shortly before the old school was demolished. The children and teachers at the school were involved in the first two series.

The outdoor school and street scenes were filmed at Troedrhiwgwair, a small village on the outskirts of Tredegar. Most of the houses used have since been demolished; however, the street remains.

In the third series, shown in 1987 and set in the early 1930s, Megan had moved on to the seaside town of Glanmor (filmed in the Ceredigion university town of Aberystwyth) where she worked with a father/son pair of doctors: Emlyn Isaacs (Freddie Jones) and James Isaacs (Nicholas Jones).

== International sales ==
The District Nurse was shown by TV2 in New Zealand. It was also dubbed and aired in Iran between 1984 and 1987.

== Major cast ==
- Megan Roberts – (Nerys Hughes)
- David Price – (John Ogwen) (series 1 & 2 only)
- Nesta Mogg – (Deborah Manship) (series 1 & 2 only)
- Gwen Harris – (Margaret John) (series 1 & 2 only)
- Evalina Williams – (Beth Morris) (series 1 & 2 only)
- Dr Emlyn Isaacs – (Freddie Jones) (series 3 only)
- Dr James Isaacs – (Nicholas Jones) (series 3 only)
- Ruth Jones – (Janet Aethwy) (series 3 only)

== DVD release ==
The first series of The District Nurse was available on DVD (Region 2, UK) by DD Home Entertainment.

== See also ==
- List of Welsh television series
