= Carla Lane =

English television writer (1928–2016)

- Lane in 1992
- Born: Romana Barrack; 5 August 1928; Walton, Liverpool, Merseyside, UK
- Died: 31 May 2016 (aged 87); Mossley Hill, Liverpool, Merseyside, UK
- Other names: Roma Barrack; Romana Hollins
- Occupations: Screenwriter; animal welfare advocate
- Years active: 1969–2016
- Spouse: Eric Arthur Hollins (m. 1948; div. 1981)
- Children: 2
- Writing career
- Pen name: Carla Lane

Romana Barrack (5 August 1928 – 31 May 2016), known by the pseudonym Carla Lane, was an English screenwriter and animal rights campaigner. Lane was known for creating or co-creating successful British sitcoms such as The Liver Birds (1969–1979), Butterflies (1978–1983), and Bread (1986–1991).

Described as "the television writer who dared to make women funny", much of Lane's work focused on strong female characters, including "frustrated housewives and working class matriarchs".

== Early life ==
Romana Barrack was born 5 August 1928 in Walton, Liverpool, to Gordon DeVinci Barrack (1907–1970), a steward in the Merchant Navy, and Ivy Amelia (née Foran;1906–1993). Lane's father was born in Cardiff and was of Italian descent, and her mother was born in Liverpool and was of Irish descent.

Lane had two siblings and grew up in West Derby and Heswall, Cheshire (present-day Merseyside). Lane was christened on the 9 January 1929, and attended convent school until the age of 14. Upon leaving school Lane worked at a baby linen shop and later took a job at Bonmarché before working at a factory in Prescot.

== Career ==
In the 1960s, Lane wrote various short stories and radio screenplays. Her first successes came in collaboration with Myra Taylor, whom she had met at a writers' workshop in Liverpool, and they would often meet at the Adelphi Hotel in the city centre to write together. She began using the stage name "Carla Lane" because of her modesty about revealing that she was a writer.

Lane and Taylor submitted some comedy sketch scripts to the BBC, where they were seen by head of comedy Michael Mills. He encouraged them to write a half-hour script, which was broadcast as a pilot episode of The Liver Birds in April 1969. A short first series followed to little acclaim, leading Mills to abandon plans for a second series, though he changed his mind when he read Lane and Taylor's new scripts. The series soon became one of the most popular of its time, characterised by Lane's "ability to conjure laughs out of pathos and life's little tragedies". Mills left his position as the BBC's head of comedy in 1972, leaving Lane to take sole responsibility for writing the show's scripts the following year.

Lane's successful screenwriting career continued through the 1970s and 1980s, in particular with the 1978–1983 sitcom Butterflies and the 1986–1991 sitcom Bread. In Butterflies, described as "undoubtedly her finest work", Lane addressed the lead character's desires for freedom from her "decent but dull" husband. Butterflies star Wendy Craig said of Lane, "Her greatest gift was that she understood women and wrote the truth about them ... she spoke about what others didn't. In the case of [my character], it was all about what was going on inside her—and many other women at the time."

With Bread, which ran for seven series, Lane was said to have become "the first woman to mine television comedy from sexual and personal relationships through a galère of expertly-etched contemporary characters, developed against a backdrop of social issues such as divorce, adultery, and alcoholism". In the late 1980s, Bread had the third-highest viewing figures on British television, beaten only by EastEnders and Neighbours. However, it was criticised by some in Liverpool for perpetuating stereotypes of people in the city, an opinion Lane rejected.

== Personal life ==
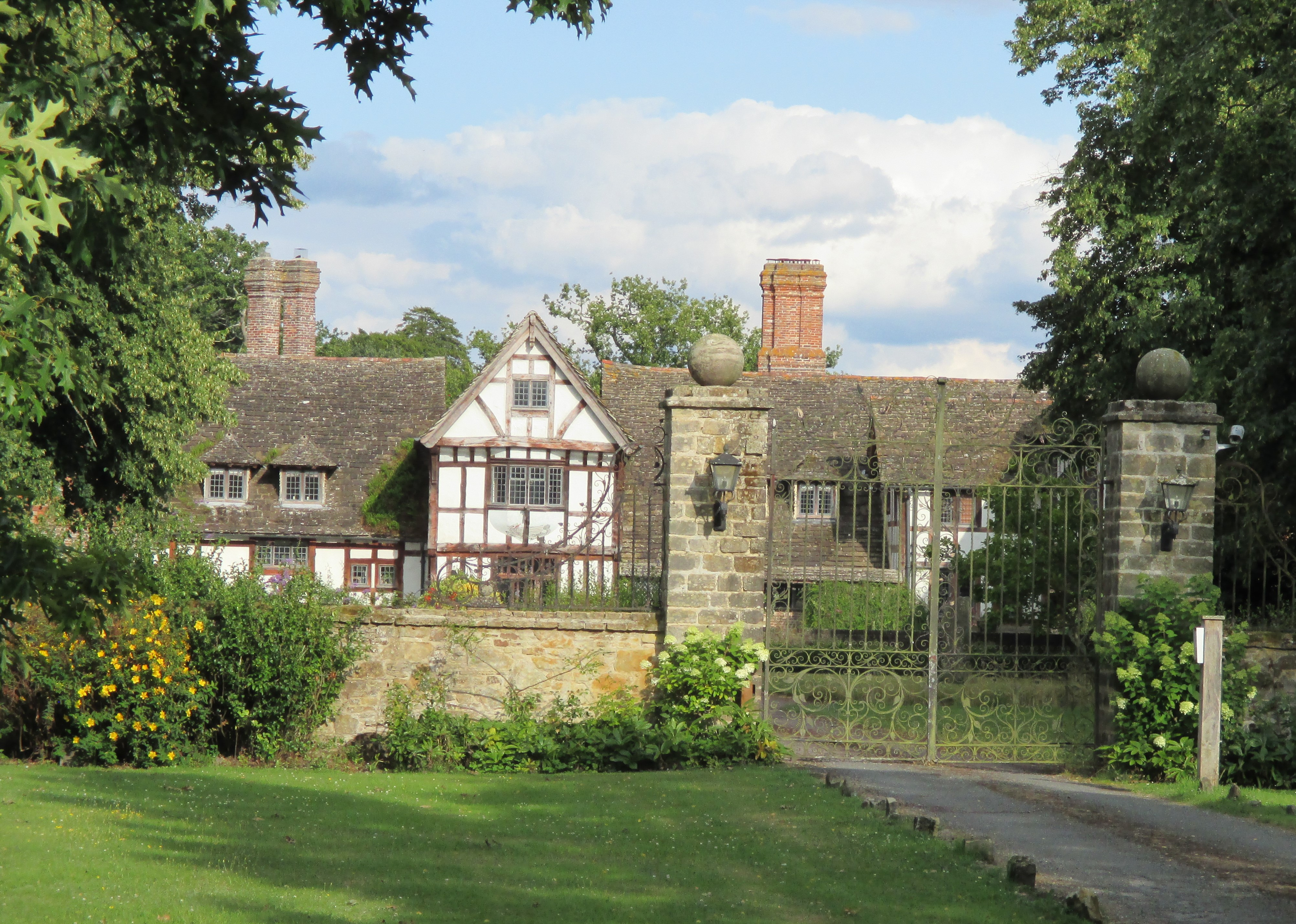
Broadhurst Manor in Horsted Keynes, Lane's home for many years

Lane married Eric Arthur Hollins on 27 March 1948, and they had two sons together before divorcing in 1981. She later claimed in her 2006 autobiography Someday I'll Find Me that she was 17 years old when she married Hollins, despite official records showing that she was 19. She lived for many years in Broadhurst Manor, her mansion in Horsted Keynes.

Lane became a vegetarian and began dedicating much of her time to the care and welfare of animals in 1965. She established the Animal Line trust with her friends, English actress Rita Tushingham and American photographer Linda McCartney, in 1990. The following year, she purchased St. Tudwal's Island East in order to protect its wildlife. She converted the grounds of her mansion into a 25-acre animal sanctuary in 1993, and operated the sanctuary for 15 years before closing it due to financial constraints.

Lane was made an OBE for services to writing in 1989, but returned it to Prime Minister Tony Blair in protest against animal cruelty in 2002. She moved back to her native Liverpool in 2009. In 2013, an animal sanctuary was opened in nearby Melling and named after her.

== Death ==
On 31 May 2016, at the age of 87, Lane died at Stapley Nursing Home in the Mossley Hill suburb of Liverpool.

== Credits ==
- 1969–1979, 1996: The Liver Birds (with Myra Taylor and others)
- 1971–1976: Bless This House (with Myra Taylor and others)
- 1974: No Strings
- 1975: Going, Going, Gone ... Free?
- 1977: Three Piece Suite
- 1978–1983, 2000: Butterflies
- 1981–1983: The Last Song
- 1981–1982: Solo
- 1984–1985: Leaving
- 1985–1987: The Mistress
- 1985–1986: I Woke Up One Morning
- 1986–1991: Bread
- 1992: Screaming
- 1993–1994: Luv
- 1995: Searching

== See also ==
- List of animal rights advocates
