= List of BBC sitcoms =

This is a list of radio and television situation comedies produced by the BBC.

== 0–9 ==
- 10:96
- 2point4 Children
- 4 O'Clock Club
- 15 Storeys High
- 500 Bus Stops

== A ==
- A Small Problem
- Absolutely Fabulous
- Absolute Power
- Abigail and Roger
- According to Bex
- After Henry (radio series)
- The Adventures of Brigadier Wellington-Bull
- After You've Gone
- Agony Again
- Ain't Misbehavin'
- The Airbase
- All About Me
- All Along the Watchtower
- All Gas and Gaiters
- All Night Long
- 'Allo 'Allo!
- An Actor's Life For Me
- Are You Being Served?
- The Artful Dodger
- As Good Cooks Go
- As Time Goes By
- Atletico Partick

== B ==
- B-And-B
- Bachelor Father
- Badults
- Ballylenon
- Band Waggon
- Bad Education
- Bear Behaving Badly
- Beast
- Beggar My Neighbour
- Big Top
- Big School
- Birds of a Feather
- Blackadder
- Blessed
- Bloomers
- Bluestone 42
- Bonjour la Classe
- Boomers
- Bottom
- Boy Meets Girl
- Bread
- The Brittas Empire
- Brotherly Love
- Brothers in Law
- Brush Strokes
- Bucket
- Butterflies

== C ==
- Carrie & Barry
- Catterick
- Chalk
- Chambers
- Chef!
- ChuckleVision
- Citizen James
- Citizen Khan
- Citizen Smith
- City Lights
- Clarence
- The Cleaner
- Colin's Sandwich
- Come Back Mrs. Noah
- Comrade Dad
- Count Arthur Strong
- Coupling
- Cradle to Grave
- Cuckoo

== D ==
- Dad
- Dad's Army
- Dear Green Place
- Dear Ladies
- Dear John
- Detectorists
- Dinnerladies
- Don't Wait Up

== E ==
- Early Doors
- Ed Stone Is Dead
- Educating Archie
- Episodes
- Ever Decreasing Circles
- Extras
- Eyes Down

== F ==
- Faces of Jim
- The Fall and Rise of Reginald Perrin
- Fawlty Towers
- Fear, Stress & Anger
- Feel the Force
- Filthy Rich & Catflap
- First of the Summer Wine
- Fleabag
- For Richer...For Poorer
- The Front Line

== G ==
- Game On
- Gary: Tank Commander
- Gavin & Stacey
- Get Back (TV series)
- Getting On
- Ghosts (2019 TV series)
- Gimme Gimme Gimme
- Give My Head Peace
- The Glam Metal Detectives
- The Gnomes of Dulwich
- The Goodies
- Going Straight
- The Good Life
- Goodnight Sweetheart
- Grace & Favour
- Grass
- The Green Green Grass
- Grown Ups
- Grownups

== H ==
- Hancock's Half Hour
- Happiness
- Happy Ever After
- Happy Hollidays
- Heartburn Hotel
- Hell's Bells
- Help
- Hi-de-Hi!
- Hippies
- His Lordship Entertains
- Hold the Sunset
- Home Again
- Home Time
- Honey for Tea
- How Do You Want Me?
- How Not to Live Your Life
- Hugh and I
- Hugh and I Spy
- Hyperdrive

== I ==
- I Didn't Know You Cared
- I'm Alan Partridge
- I'm with Stupid
- Ideal
- If You See God, Tell Him
- In Sickness and in Health
- It Ain't Half Hot Mum
- Inside No. 9
- In with the Flynns
- I Want My Wife Back
- I Woke Up One Morning

== J ==
- Jam & Jerusalem
- Joking Apart
- Josh
- Just Good Friends
- Justin's House

== K ==
- Keeping Mum
- Keeping Up Appearances
- Kiss Me Kate

== L ==
- Lab Rats
- Lame Ducks
- The Last Song (TV series)
- Last of the Summer Wine
- Lead Balloon
- Leaving (TV series)
- The League of Gentlemen
- Legit (2006 TV series)
- Life of Riley
- The Life of Rock with Brian Pern
- Life's Too Short
- The Likely Lads
- The Liver Birds
- Luv (TV series)

== M ==
- Maid Marian and Her Merry Men
- May to December
- Men Behaving Badly
- Meet the Wife
- The Mighty Boosh
- Millie Inbetween
- Millport (radio show)
- Miranda
- The Mistress (TV series)
- Mongrels
- Mrs. Brown's Boys
- Mulberry
- My Family
- My Hero
- Me Mammy

== N ==
- Next of Kin
- No Place Like Home
- No Strings (1974 TV series)
- Not Going Out
- Not in Front of the Children

== O ==
- The Office
- Office Gossip
- Oh, Brother!
- The Old Guys
- One Foot in the Grave
- Open All Hours
- Only Fools and Horses
- Outnumbered
- Oh, Doctor Beeching!
- 'Orrible
- On the Up

== P ==
- Peter Kay's Car Share
- Porridge
- Pramface
- A Prince Among Men
- People Just Do Nothing
- Pulling

== Q ==
- Quacks

== R ==
- Rab C. Nesbitt
- Red Dwarf
- Rev
- Rings on Their Fingers
- The River (British TV series)
- Rosie
- The Royal Bodyguard
- The Royle Family

== S ==
- Scot Squad
- Screaming (TV series)
- Siblings
- Sink or Swim
- So Awkward
- So Haunt Me
- Solo (TV series)
- Some Girls
- Some Mothers Do 'Ave 'Em
- Sorry!
- Steptoe and Son
- Sykes
- Still Game
- Still Open All Hours
- SunTrap
- Sweet Sixteen (TV series)
- Swiss Toni

== T ==
- Take It From Here
- Terry and June
- The Thin Blue Line
- Three Up, Two Down
- This Country
- Till Death Us Do Part
- To the Manor Born
- Twenty Twelve
- Two Doors Down
- Two Pints of Lager and a Packet of Crisps
- The Tuckers
- Tutti Frutti

== U ==
- Up Pompeii!
- Upstart Crow
- Up the Women
- Uncle

== V ==
- The Vicar of Dibley
- The Visit
- The Vital Spark

== W ==
Whoops Baghdad

- W1A
- Waiting for God
- Warren
- Whatever Happened to the Likely Lads?
- White Gold
- White Van Man
- The World of Wodehouse
- The World of Wooster
- The Wright Way
- Wyatt's Watchdogs

== Y ==
- Yes Minister
- Yes, Prime Minister
- The Young Ones
- You Must Be the Husband
- You Rang, M'Lord?

== Z ==
- Zig and Zag

== See also ==
- List of television programmes broadcast by the BBC
