= Just My Bill =

Just My Bill may refer to:

- "Just My Bill" (The Good Life), a 1975 television episode
- "Just My Bill" (Knight Rider), a 1982 television episode
