= The Mistress (TV series) =

British TV sitcom (1985–1987)

- DVD cover
- Created by: Carla Lane
- Directed by: Gareth Gwenlan
- Starring: Felicity Kendal; Jack Galloway; Peter McEnery; Jane Asher
- Country of origin: United Kingdom
- Original language: English
- No. of series: 2
- No. of episodes: 12

Production
- Producer: Gareth Gwenlan
- Running time: 30 minutes

Original release
- Network: BBC2
- Release: 17 January 1985 – 26 February 1987

The Mistress is a British sitcom that first aired on BBC2 from 1985 to 1987. Starring Felicity Kendal and Jane Asher, it was written by Carla Lane.

The Mistress features Kendal playing Maxine, a young florist, who is having an affair with a married man. It was disliked by some viewers, who were unhappy at seeing Felicity Kendal (best known as Barbara Good in The Good Life) playing a woman having an affair with someone else's husband.

== Plot ==
Maxine is the owner of a florist shop and is having an affair with married man Luke. His wife Helen is unaware of the affair. While Maxine occasionally feels guilty and insecure about the affair, she is a generally optimistic and happy person.

In the second series, Helen begins to suspect that Luke is having an affair, but when she tells him he neither admits it nor denies it. Helen moves out to stay with her sister. In the penultimate episode, Helen returns home and they share their bed. Maxine has a drunken escapade with a young man she meets in a cafe and they spend the night sharing her bed, but the young man is only seen next morning still fully dressed and above the covers. In the final episode, Luke effectively admits to Helen that he has had an affair but it is over, and they both say they do not want to get a divorce. Maxine and Luke angrily return each other's gifts, but ultimately admit that they are still in love. The programme and the series ends with Maxine on the phone telling her shop assistant and friend Jamie that the affair is over, and that she is pregnant.

== Cast ==
- Felicity Kendal as Maxine Mansel (Maxine as series 2)
- Jack Galloway as Luke Carpenter (series 1) (called Luke Mansel in Series 2)
- Peter McEnery as Luke (series 2) (Luke Mansel in Series 2)
- Jane Asher as Helen Carpenter (called Helen Mansel in Series 2)
- Tony Aitken as Simon
- Jenny McCracken as Jenny (series 1)
- Paul Copley as Jamie (series 2)
- Peggy Sirr as Jo

== Production ==
Similar to Carla Lane's other sitcoms, including Butterflies and Solo (which also starred Felicity Kendal), The Mistress has a serious theme – here, that of an affair. The series was produced and directed by Gareth Gwenlan. The Mistress was filmed in Bath, Somerset, the florist shop being in Abbey Green, Bath and Maxine's house location at 26 St Mark's Road, Bath. After the lukewarm response to Series 1 over the subject matter, Series 2 was no more successful, and the series was axed after Series 2, which ended with a significant plot development. The sitcom, which had never been reshown previously, was aired on BBC Four in January, February and March 2023.

== Episodes ==
The Mistress aired for two series, each of six 30 minute episodes, from 17 January 1985 to 26 February 1987. The episodes were originally shown at 9.00pm on Thursdays on BBC2.

=== Series 1 (1985) ===
No.	Title	Original release date
1	"Episode One"	17 January 1985
2	"Episode Two"	24 January 1985
3	"Episode Three"	31 January 1985
4	"Episode Four"	7 February 1985
5	"Episode Five"	14 February 1985
6	"Episode Six"	21 February 1985

=== Series 2 (1987) ===
No. overall	No. in series	Title	Original release date
7	1	"Episode One"	22 January 1987
8	2	"Episode Two"	29 January 1987
9	3	"Episode Three"	5 February 1987
10	4	"Episode Four"	12 February 1987
11	5	"Episode Five"	19 February 1987
12	6	"Episode Six"	26 February 1987

== Home releases ==
The two series of The Mistress were released in a boxset in Region 2 (UK) on 10 March 2014.

== See also ==
British sitcom
