= Della Jones =

Welsh mezzo-soprano

Della Jones (born 13 April 1946) is a Welsh mezzo-soprano, particularly well known for her interpretations of works by Handel, Mozart, Rossini, Donizetti, and Britten.

== Early life ==
Jones was born on 13 April 1946 in Tonna, near Neath, Wales. She attended Neath Grammar School for Girls. She studied at the Royal College of Music, where she won the Kathleen Ferrier Memorial Scholarship.

== Career ==
In Geneva she made her professional debut in 1970, as Feodor in Boris Godunov and Olga in Eugene Onegin.

In 1977 she joined the English National Opera, where she created the role of Dolly in Iain Hamilton's Anna Karenina in 1981, and the Royal Opera House in 1983, and began appearing abroad, notably in France, Italy, and the United States.

In 1984 she appeared in the Channel 4 series Top C's and Tiaras.

She sang Arne's Rule, Britannia! alongside John Tomlinson at the 1993 Last Night of the Proms.

Her repertoire ranges from baroque to contemporary works, with a specialty in the bel canto operas, notably of Rossini. In the mid-1970s she began a long association with Opera Rara, appearing in many long-forgotten bel canto works, both on stage and on recording. She can be heard in complete recordings of Donizetti's Ugo, conte di Parigi, L'assedio di Calais, Maria Padilla, Meyerbeer's Il crociato in Egitto and Rossini's Ricciardo e Zoraide and made a solo album with the title Della Jones sings Donizetti, in all of which one can appreciate her impeccable coloratura technique and strong feeling for words and music.

Between 1986 and 1987 she sang the role of Ruggiero in Handel's Alcina, a role which she recorded in 1986, alongside Arleen Auger and Patrizia Kwella, under the direction of Richard Hickox for EMI Classics.

For Chandos records she also made albums such as Great Operatic Arias - Della Jones.

Della Jones is still at home in the international opera and concert world today. She currently lives in south-east England.
