= List of The Good Life episodes =

The following is a list of episodes for the British sitcom The Good Life that aired from 4 April 1975 to 10 June 1978, and starred Richard Briers (Tom Good), Felicity Kendal (Barbara Good), Penelope Keith (Margo Leadbetter) and Paul Eddington (Jerry Leadbetter). There were four series, each of seven episodes, and two specials. All thirty episodes are 30 minutes long.

Since the deaths of Paul Eddington, Richard Briers and Penelope Keith on 4 November 1995, 17 February 2013 and 29 June 2026 respectively, Felicity Kendal is the only surviving cast member.

== Series overview ==
Series	Episodes	Originally released		
Series	Episodes	First released	Last released	Network
1	7	4 April 1975	16 May 1975	BBC 1
2	7	5 December 1975	23 January 1976	BBC 1
3	7	10 September 1976	22 October 1976	BBC 1
4	7	10 April 1977	22 May 1977	BBC 1
Christmas Special		26 December 1977		BBC 1
Royal Command Performance		10 June 1978		BBC 1

== Regular episodes (1975–77) ==
=== Series 1 (1975) ===
No. overall	No. in series	Title	Original release date	UK viewers (millions)
1	1	"Plough Your Own Furrow"	4 April 1975	5.9
On his 40th birthday, Tom Good gets depressed at work as everyone in his office is younger than him. That evening, he stays up until the early hours, and decides to quit the rat race and his job as a draughtsman and become self-sufficient. After thinking in the garden, his wife, Barbara agrees to the idea. However, Jerry thinks they are mad. Guest starring Norman Atkyns and Martin Neil. Margo is only heard at the end of the episode and not seen.
2	2	"Say Little Hen..."	11 April 1975	8.2
Barbara is converting the greenhouse into a chicken shed, which increases Margo's concern for the couple. Jerry invites his boss Andrew and his wife Felicity round for dinner with the idea that they can persuade Tom to go back to work. However, Tom quickly turns the offer down and he and Barbara then decide to prove to Margo they are a success by making a lavish dinner.
3	3	"The Weaker Sex?"	18 April 1975	6.5
After Tom barters for a range from the rag and bone man Sam (Tony Selby), Barbara is left to clean all the rust off it, while Tom tries to invent something to scare the birds. Soon Barbara gets fed up and goes next door to Margo and Jerry's. Guest starring Paul McDowell.
4	4	"Pig's Lib"	25 April 1975	7.9
Margo is horrified when Tom and Barbara buy two pigs, Pinky and Perky, and gets in the Chairman of the Residents' Association, Mr. Carter (Robert Gillespie) in the hope that he will stop them. However, he decides that as long as the pigs stay in the Good's garden, they can keep the pigs. Soon, Pinky and Perky escape into Margo's garden and she insists the Goods get rid of them. However, Margo soon regrets this decision and Tom makes a mercy dash to try and save them from the abattoir. Guest starring Jonathan Lynn, Lionel Wheeler and John Lawrence.
5	5	"The Thing in the Cellar"	2 May 1975	8.0
Tom has successfully built his own generator, run by the methane from his animals' manure, but Margo is not impressed and suggests to Barbara that he should see a Psychiatrist. While Tom and Barbara go to get firewood, Jerry stays at their house to wait in for an electrician. However, the generator breaks down. Later, when Jerry has the day off, he and Tom go fishing, but Tom later discovers he can not freeze the fish due to the generator being broken. Guest starring Ray Mort.
6	6	"The Pagan Rite"	9 May 1975	8.7
Tom and Barbara are invited round to dinner after Andrew orders Jerry to invite them because he wants Tom to do some freelance work for JJM. Tom initially refuses, but after Barbara says she misses their "pagan rites", when they used to splash out and stay at a hotel for one night, he secretly does the freelance work so he and Barbara can stay at a luxury hotel for the night. Guest starring John Scott Martin.
7	7	"Backs to the Wall"	16 May 1975	7.7
Margo and Jerry are off to Kenya for a safari, and the Goods are meant to be getting in their harvest but Tom hurts his back and a storm then ruins the garden. They try to get help from the pub, but get nowhere, so they are relieved when the Leadbetters come home early, as Margo couldn't stand Africa, and even Margo helps out. Guest starring June Jago, Billy Milton, Pamela Manson, Frank Lester and Harry Goodier.

=== Series 2 (1975–76) ===
No. overall	No. in series	Title	Original release date	UK viewers (millions)
8	1	"Just My Bill"	5 December 1975	9.2
Having gathered their harvest, Tom and Barbara need to sell their surplus produce. Jerry tells him that it won't be that easy, but Tom replies that he's already agreed to sell it to a restaurant called The Runcible Spoon. However, the restaurant owner isn't so obliging when he realises the Goods can only supply them once.
9	2	"The Guru of Surbiton"	12 December 1975	10.5
Margo and Jerry return from Amsterdam to discover that Tom and Barbara have two earnest University students called Guy (Bruce Bould) and Ruth (Irene Richard) staying for the week to help out in the garden. When the house next to the Goods goes up for the sale, Guy, whose father owns "most" of Staffordshire, wants to buy it and turn it into a commune.
10	3	"Mr. Fix-It"	19 December 1975	9.0
A freelance journalist writes an article on the Goods and their way of life. He manages to sell it to The Observer. Jerry offers to get them lots of free goods by letting local shops use their name in advertising. But in fact, the article is only sold to the low-circulation 'Ox and Bucks Observer', and the goods have to go back.
11	4	"The Day Peace Broke Out"	2 January 1976	9.3
Tom discovers that eight leeks have been stolen from his front garden, and stays up all night to catch the thief, who he then shoots with an air gun. The thief, Harry Bennett, then takes Tom to court for common assault. Tom refuses to be bound over and is sent to prison for 28 days to reconsider. Later, Harry comes round to apologise. Guest starring James Cossins.
12	5	"Mutiny"	9 January 1976	11.7
While playing golf with Andrew, Jerry agrees to put up a Dutch businessman for the weekend, but when he gets home is reminded that Margo is playing the lead role of Maria in The Sound of Music. He tells Andrew that he can't put up the visitor and is sacked. Tom tries to get Jerry his job back and succeeds.
13	6	"Home Sweet Home"	16 January 1976	12.0
Margo is delighted with the new neighbours, Mr and Mrs Weaver (the former never appears on-screen), but when she comes to tell Tom and Barbara the good news, she is horrified to be told that a boar is coming round to "serve" Pinky. The boar's owner, Mr May, tells them that there is a farm near where he lives that would be perfect for them, so the Goods decide to move. But they can't go through with the move.
14	7	"Going to Pot?"	23 January 1976	12.2
Tom and Barbara decide to enrol in evening classes; they both do house maintenance, and Tom does weaving while Margo joins Barbara doing pottery. Before they even attend a class, Jerry buys Margo a "studio" to do her pottery as an early birthday present. But after her first class, she leaves the evening class, and Tom and Barbara swap evening classes after failing at their own. Soon Tom uses Margo's studio when Mrs Weaver admires his pottery and commissions him to make her some.

=== Series 3 (1976) ===
No. overall	No. in series	Title	Original release date	UK viewers (millions)
15	1	"The Early Birds"	10 September 1976	13.1
The Goods and the Leadbetters fall out after Tom and Barbara make too much noise while working in their garden early in the morning. However, they soon apologise and they then decide to change their sleeping pattern by going to bed early and getting up early, but it turns out to be more difficult than it sounds.
16	2	"The Happy Event"	17 September 1976	15.4
Pinky is expecting, and she goes in labour in the middle of the night. Margo and Jerry are called into help, but the eighth piglet is a runt. In an attempt to save it, Jerry and Barbara rush to the hospital to get some oxygen, but are stopped by a policeman for speeding, while Margo helps Tom.
17	3	"A Tug of the Forelock"	24 September 1976	16.4
When Mr and Mrs Pearson, Margo's domestics, go on holiday for a month to Canada, Tom and Barbara need money for a new mode of transport, so they decide to fill their place. However, after a week they are sacked for their behaviour.
18	4	"I Talk to the Trees"	1 October 1976	16.7
While at their allotment, Tom and Barbara come across Mr Wakely talking to his plants and he claims that it helps them grow. Tom then decides to do an experiment to see whether he is right. Meanwhile, Margo is trying to become president of the music society.
19	5	"The Wind-Break War"	8 October 1976	15.8
Following her election as President of the Music Society, Margo decides to build an arbour in her garden, complete with a windbreak. However, this threatens to shadow Tom and Barbara's crops, so they ask her round to move the windbreak. She agrees but after an argument, the windbreak is not moved, but once the confusion is cleared up, they all have dinner together and share some of the Good's homemade wine. Guest starring Timothy Bateson.
20	6	"Whose Fleas are These?"	15 October 1976	17.7
Tom and Barbara's chimney, having not been swept for some time, sweeps itself and they get covered in soot. As the soot also put the fire out, they go to Margo and Jerry's for a hot bath, but when they get home they realise they've got fleas. Mr Bulstrode (Michael Robbins), the council official who comes round to deal with the fleas, says they came from a dog. Meanwhile, Margo has been asked to become actively involved with the Conservative Party at the next general election.
21	7	"The Last Posh Frock"	22 October 1976	14.7
Barbara feels she has lost touch with her feminine side, which is not helped by Tom being more interested in his new effluence digester than Barbara in her posh frock. However, after she rips the frock, Tom decides to organise a dinner party for Barbara's reunion with her old school friend Eileen, plus Margo and Jerry, but the evening goes badly when Tom spends most of the evening drooling over the attractive Eileen in her posh frock. Some wise words from Jerry help Tom make good.

=== Series 4 (1977) ===
No. overall	No. in series	Title	Original release date	UK viewers (millions)
22	1	"Away From It All"	10 April 1977	7.5
Tom and Barbara are depressed when their latest crop is a letdown, so when they go to Margo and Jerry's for dinner are not in the best of moods. The Leadbetters persuade them to take a weekend break in a luxury Mayfair flat belonging to a friend of Jerry's, as a rest cure, and Margo and Jerry volunteer to look after the animals while they're away.
23	2	"The Green Door"	17 April 1977	15.0
Tom and Barbara are in desperate need of manure for fertiliser, and get the idea to go up to Margo's pony club and ask for some there. Margo forbids them to do so, but they ignore her. Although Margo claims to be going riding every week, and keeps going out of the house dressed appropriately, Mrs Holman, the riding stable's owner, mentions that Margo hasn't been up there for months. The Goods then see her in town, going into a building which appears to be a private flat, and jump to the conclusion that she's having an affair.
24	3	"Our Speaker Today"	24 April 1977	14.1
Margo asks Barbara to give a talk on self-sufficiency to the Townswomen's Guild in front of Lady Truscott (Angela Thorne). When the talk is a success, Lady Truscott gets Barbara to give a succession of talks to other groups. Meanwhile, Tom is left to try to put up a new chicken shed on his own, whilst Margo sends Jerry to Fortnum & Mason's to buy a hamper so they can entertain Lady Truscott. Robert Lindsay appears in a small role.
25	4	"The Weaver's Tale"	1 May 1977	14.6
After a successful crop of soft fruit Tom and Barbara have a float of £10, but on a visit to Dorking with Margo, who on impulse buys a spinning wheel as a curio, Tom spends all his money in buying a second-hand loom to use with it to make clothes, which he sees as a further step on the road to self-sufficiency. Meanwhile, Jerry seeks Barbara's advice about Margo's extravagant spending, advice which leads to him refusing to pay for the spinning wheel, so Margo leaves him.
26	5	"Suit Yourself"	8 May 1977	12.5
Tom and Barbara are busy making a suit for Tom using sheep's wool with dye made from stinging nettles, while Margo and Jerry are preparing for an important dinner party at which Jerry's boss, Sir, will announce his retirement from JJM. Jerry writes a business proposal on how he would take the company forward, if chosen as Sir's successor, but then accidentally forgets to take it with him to the restaurant.
27	6	"Sweet & Sour Charity"	15 May 1977	15.0
Mrs Weaver has moved to Esher, and Tom wants to take the oil from her central heating tank so he can swap it for some straw. Meanwhile, Jerry is trying to discredit Snetterton (Philip Madoc) in the race to succeed Sir at JJM, and Margo is asked to play the lead in the Music Society's production of Sweet Charity.
28	7	"Anniversary"	22 May 1977	12.0
Due to the oil leak caused by Mrs Weaver's faulty tank, much of the Goods' garden is unusable and Geraldine isn't producing any milk. These problems mean Tom is not in the mood to celebrate either his 42nd birthday or the second anniversary of self-sufficiency; but after Jerry succeeds Sir at JJM, all four celebrate. However, when they return to Tom and Barbara's, they discover the house has been broken into and the living room vandalised. Jerry tries to make Tom and Barbara see the futility of their lifestyle, offering Tom his old job back. However, the Goods remain as determined as ever to continue.

== Specials (1977–78) ==
=== Christmas Special (1977) ===
Overall	Title	First broadcast	Overview	Original viewing figure
29	Silly, But It's Fun....	26 December 1977	It's Christmas Eve, and in the Goods' house Tom and Barbara are making home-made decorations and crackers in readiness for Christmas Day; while at the Leadbetters', after a standoff with a delivery driver (David Battley), Margo has sent back her whole order because the Christmas tree was six and a quarter inches too short. But when the shop does not deliver her order the following day, she and Jerry are left with no decorations, food or drink. So Tom and Barbara invite them round for a self-sufficiency Christmas of homemade paper hats and improvised party games.	21 million

=== Royal Command Performance (1978) ===
Title	First broadcast	Overview	Original viewing figure
When I'm 65	10 June 1978	Jerry is having a medical so he can take out yet another pension policy, as he and Margo are determined to enjoy their retirement. This makes Tom realise that he has no pension plans at all, so goes to his bank manager Mr Downs (George Cole) to propose that he get a pension from the bank and in return they get his house when he and Barbara are dead. This idea is now called equity release, however on Tom's figures Mr Downs calls it "fantasy". Jerry, frightened by the results of his medical, buys a load of exercise equipment and takes up jogging; so Tom challenges him to a race to prove who is fitter. The two wives cheer on their husbands, but they decide to get into a taxi. The women find out after the taxi driver comes to return Jerry's wallet which he had left inside the taxi. Tom and Jerry run away, again.	14.4 million
