= Burt Rhodes =

English band leader, arranger, composer and conductor (1923–2003)

- Born: 17 April 1923; Guiseley, West Yorkshire, England
- Died: 21 June 2003 (aged 80)
- Occupations: Band leader Arranger; Composer; Conductor; Musical director
- Known for: British television theme songs, Broadway and West End shows
- Spouse: Rosalyn Wilder
- Children: 1

Burt Rhodes (17 April 1923 – 21 June 2003) was one of Britain's most successful light entertainment musical directors and composers. His career covered radio and TV, West End and Broadway musicals and he worked with many famous stars including Judy Garland, Pearl Bailey, Sammy Davis Jr., Vic Damone, Cliff Richard, Johnny Mathis, Frankie Vaughan, Lovelace Watkins, The Supremes, Eartha Kitt, Howard Keel and Bruce Forsyth.

Rhodes was born in Guiseley, West Yorkshire. In his childhood he had learned to play the piano and the organ. He became a professional musician after military service in World War II. He worked in night clubs and with Harry Roy's band before becoming a bandleader himself for BBC radio. This led to work on many television productions including The Benny Hill Show, The Nixon Line with the magician David Nixon, and the BBC's annual pantomime. He worked on the television shows of Paul Daniels and Beryl Reid.

In 1958 he was the musical director for Wolf Mankowitz's Expresso Bongo which starred Paul Scofield and Millicent Martin. He followed this with Anthony Newley's Stop the World – I Want to Get Off and Lionel Bart's Blitz! of which Noël Coward said it was "noisier and longer than the real thing".

In September 1958 Robert Nesbitt, impresario Bernard Delfont and restaurateur Charles Forte opened the Talk of the Town on the site of the old London Hippodrome and converted it into a restaurant and cabaret venue. Rhodes had provided the music for Nesbitt's glamorous floorshows, and by 1961 he had become musical director with his own large orchestra for more than 20 years. He directed the music at several Royal Variety Performances at the London Palladium. He also served on committees for the Musicians' Union and the Performing Right Society. While there he accompanied such artists as Pearl Bailey, Mel Tormé, Judy Garland, Johnny Mathis, The Supremes and Frankie Vaughan.

He was also a prolific composer and among his memorable credits was the theme tune for the critically acclaimed television sitcom The Good Life. Much appreciated by his peers for his professionalism and intelligence, he was often referred to as "the musicians' musician". He numbered among his many friends musicians such as Ronnie Hazlehurst, Monty Norman and Phil Phillips. He also orchestrated film scores, including the theme tune for the first James Bond film Dr No (1962). In the 1980s he appeared on screen in the Channel 4 series Top C's and Tiaras.

Rhodes was a life-long cricket fan and a member of the Marylebone Cricket Club. He was married to Rosalyn Wilder who was Judy Garland's assistant during her season at the Talk of the Town. He died in 2003, aged 80. He is survived by his daughter Alison and his partner Rosalyn.
