= Top C's and Tiaras =

Television series

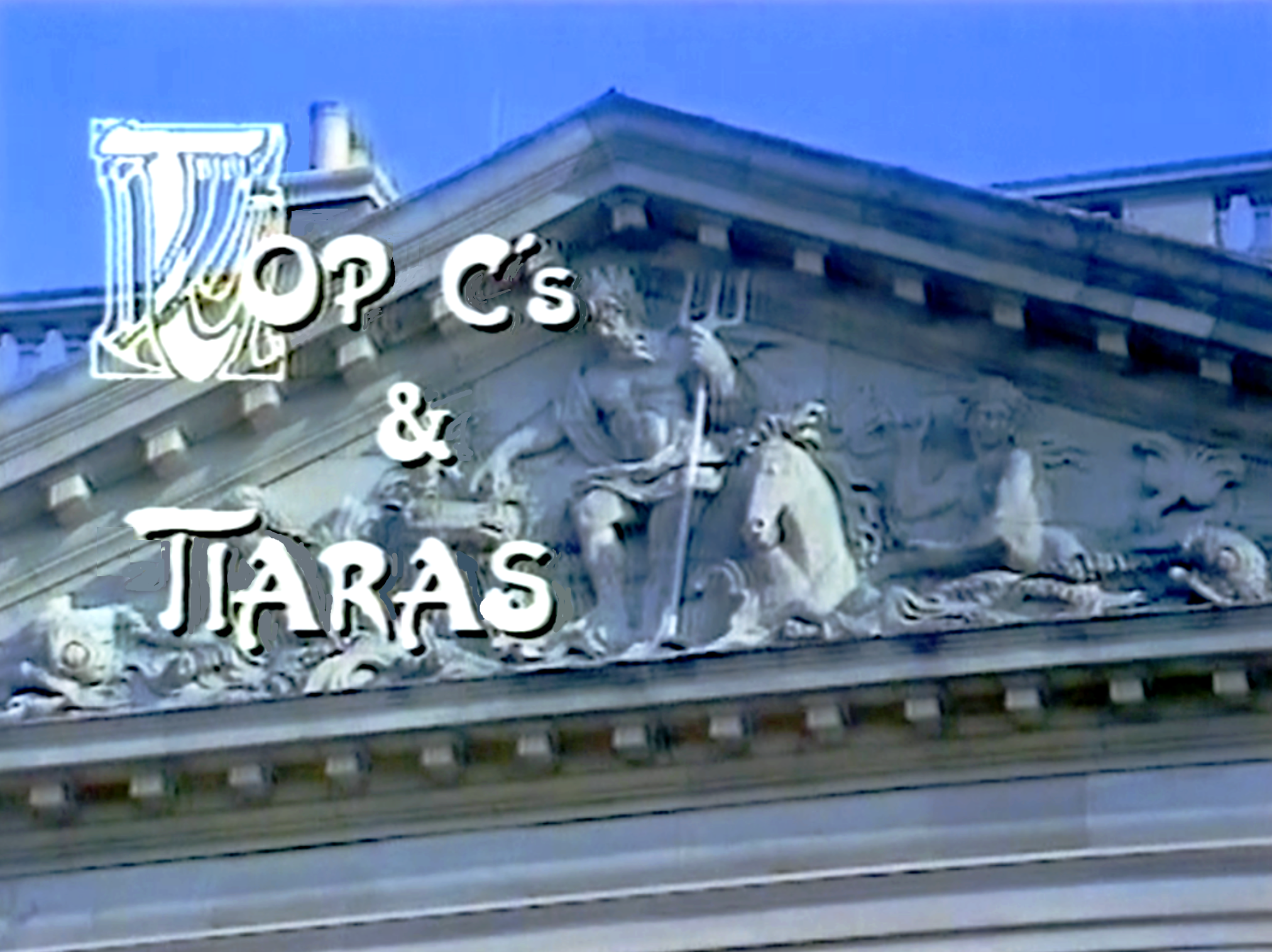
- Created by: Neil Anthony
- Directed by: Bryan Izzard
- Starring: Marilyn Hill Smith, Peter Morrison, Julia Migenes and Benjamin Luxon
- Country of origin: United Kingdom

Production
- Producers: Neil Anthony and Bryan Izzard
- Production location: Wrotham Park
- Running time: 55 minutes
- Production company: The Bright Thoughts Company

Original release
- Network: Channel 4
- Release: 10 April 1983 – 3 June 1984

Top C's and Tiaras is a television program, featuring operetta and musical comedy, that was broadcast on Channel 4 television in the United Kingdom between April 10, 1983, and June 3, 1984. It featured performers such as Julia Migenes, Marilyn Hill Smith, Peter Morrison and Benjamin Luxon. It was devised and produced by Neil Anthony, and made by The Bright Thoughts Company.

== Production ==
Most of the programme was recorded on location at Wrotham Park, in Hertfordshire. Both the house and grounds were used for performances, and singing was accompanied by a live orchestra, under the musical direction of Harry Rabinowitz and Burt Rhodes. All performances were sung live, without the use of dubbing, and without an audience. The director for the series was the television entertainment veteran, Bryan Izzard. Other performers involved in the series included Laurence Dale, Della Jones, Harry Nicoll, Jill Washington, Jean Bailey, Hugh Hetherington, Neil Jenkins, Eirian James, David Fieldsend, Linda Ormiston, and Ramon Remedios. All episodes ran to 55 minutes in length.

== Episodes ==
Specials:

1. Top C's and Tiaras (10 April 1983)
2. Top C's and Tiaras II (31 October 1983)

Series 1:

1. "This Will be my Shining Hour" (29 April 1984)
2. "The Best of All Possible Worlds" (6 May 1984)
3. "One Night of Love" (13 May 1984)
4. "Dance Little Lady" (20 May 1984)
5. "Play to me Gypsy" (27 May 1984)
6. "When Vienna Sings" (3 June 1984)

== Reception ==
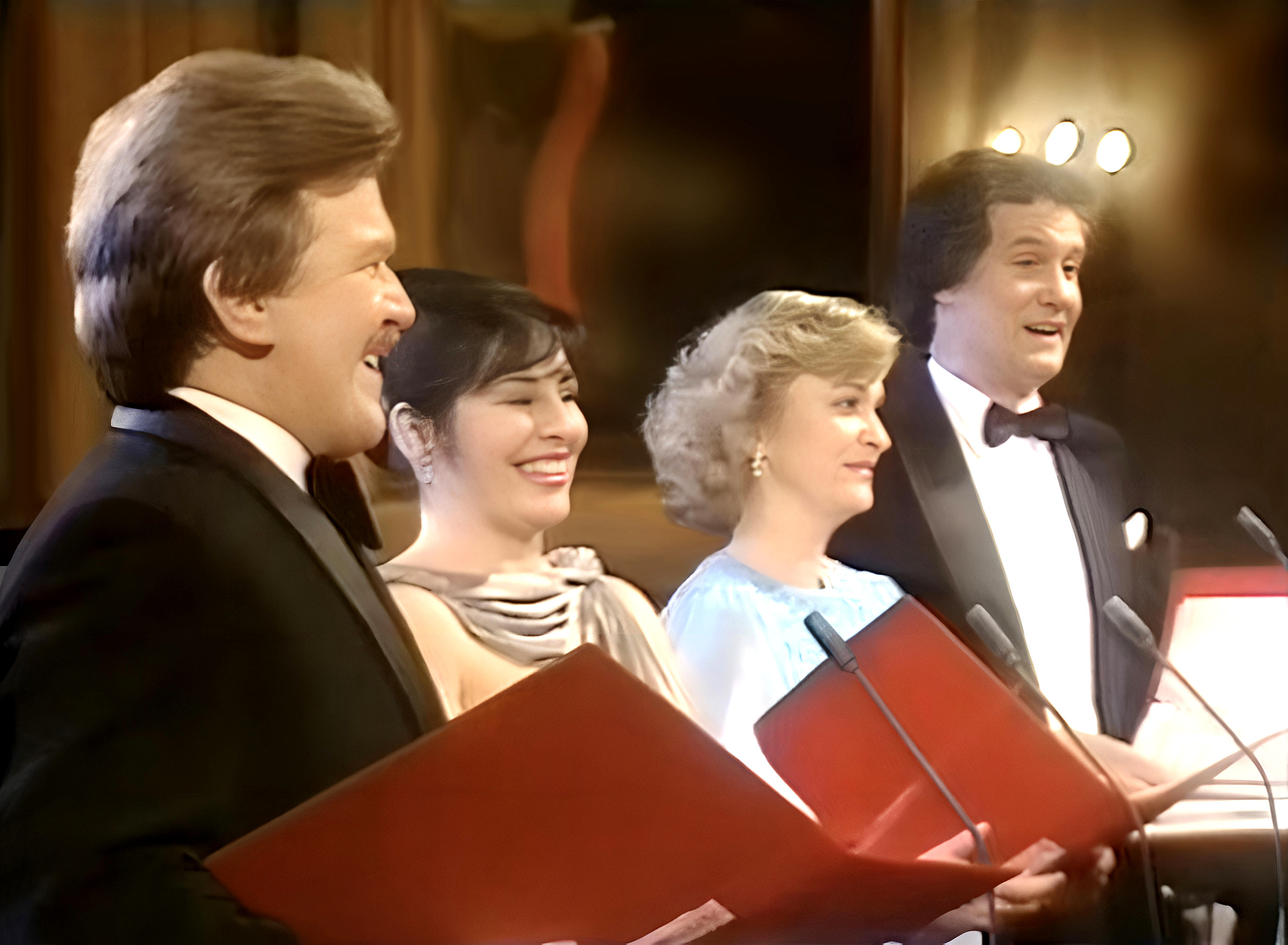
Neil Jenkins, Jean Bailey, Marilyn Hill Smith and Peter Morrison.

The programme was regarded within Channel 4 as being a popular success. The 1983-1984 Channel 4 Annual Report noted that the programme "won the channel's most enthusiastic response by phone and letter for its stylish rediscovery of the middle ground of operetta" It has been argued that Channel 4 "revived the music of Johann Strauss, Franz Lehar, Rudolph Friml, Sigmund Romberg and other light classical composers in Top Cs and Tiaras, with the help of a singer with a remarkable voice and great style, Julia Migenes-Johnson".

Peter Lewis, writing in The Times, commented that "Top Cs and Tiaras pioneered a new, relaxed, unstuffy approach tonight music on television...no tiaras, not much evening dress, no old-fashioned pomp and hand-clasping - and no audience...they let their hair down together, not in a studio or theatre but a country house, singing around a piano to one another or wandering through the gilded rooms or the grounds. The artists help to choose their songs, miming is banished - it is shot as it is sung - and they give every appearance of really enjoying themselves". Sean Day-Lewis, writing in the Daily Telegraph, expressed the view that the programme was a "slickly assembled and more or less uncorrupted sequence of melodies from operetta and musical comedy", and that "it was an excellently finished video which would have won a high rating indeed on one of the senior channels". The Listener magazine noted that "the programme conveys a sense of fun, and at least it resuscitates some sparkling operetta tunes"

Former Channel 4 Chief Executive Jeremy Isaacs wrote about Top C's and Tiaras in his 1989 memoir, Storm Over 4. He quoted examples of the influx of appreciative telephone calls from viewers for the first edition, that were logged in the Duty Officer's report for April 10, 1983, and said that Top C's and Tiaras, "though made on a shoestring, went down a treat with the fans".

== Commercial releases ==
An accompanying tie-in book, Top C's and Tiaras: Songs from the Channel 4 Series, was published in 1984. A number of CDs based on the program, Treasures of Operetta, featuring Marilyn Hill Smith and Peter Morrison, were released by Chandos Records between 1985 and 1989.
