= Felicity Kendal =

English actress (born 1946)

Felicity Kendal CBE
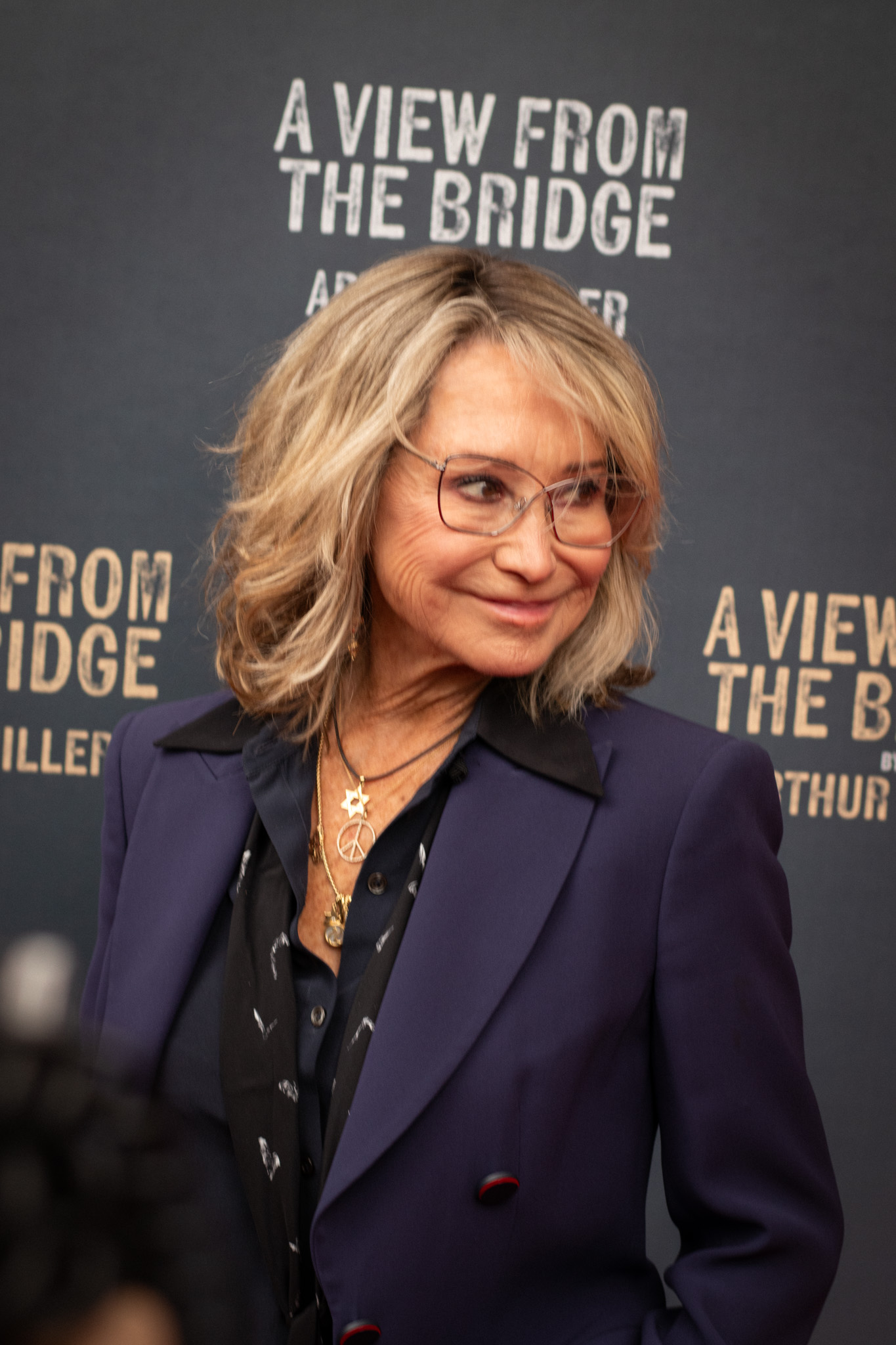
- Kendal in 2024
- Born: 25 September 1946 (age 80); Olton, Warwickshire, England
- Occupation: Actress
- Years active: 1967–present
- Notable work: The Good Life; Rosemary & Thyme
- Spouses: Drewe Henley (m. 1968; div. 1979); Michael Rudman (m. 1983; div. 1990)
- Partner(s): Tom Stoppard (1991–1998); Michael Rudman (1998–2023; his death)
- Children: 2, including Charley Henley
- Parents: Geoffrey Kendal (father); Laura Liddell (mother)
- Relatives: Jennifer Kendal (sister)

Felicity Ann Kendal (born 25 September 1946) is an English actress, working principally in television and theatre. She has appeared in numerous stage and screen roles over a more than 70-year career, including Barbara Good in the television series The Good Life from 1975 to 1978. Kendal was born in England, but moved to India with her family aged seven. Her father was an English actor-manager who led his own repertory company on tours of India, and Kendal appeared in roles for the company both before and after leaving England. She appeared in the film Shakespeare Wallah (1965), which was inspired by her family.

Kendal made several television appearances, starting with Love Story in 1966, and made her London stage debut in Minor Murder (1967) at the Savoy Theatre. She was approached to appear in The Good Life while appearing in The Norman Conquests, and appeared in all four series. She later went on to star in the sitcoms Solo (1981–82) and The Mistress (1985 and 1987) which were scripted by Carla Lane. Later television work included The Camomile Lawn (1992), which, as of 2022, remained the most-watched drama ever on Channel 4. However, the poor reception to the 1994 sitcom Honey for Tea led Kendal to focus on stage rather than television work for some years. She co-starred with Pam Ferris on television in Rosemary & Thyme (2003–2006) as one of a pair of gardeners and detectives.

Kendal's stage career blossomed during the 1980s and 1990s when she formed a close professional association with Tom Stoppard, starring in the first productions of many of his plays, including On the Razzle (1981), The Real Thing (1982), Hapgood (1988), and Arcadia (1993). She also appeared in ten plays directed by Peter Hall, from portraying Constanze Mozart in Amadeus (1979) to Esme in Amy's View (2006). She took her first role in a musical as Evangeline Harcourt in the 2021 London revival of Anything Goes at the Barbican Theatre. In 2023, she starred as Dotty Otley in Noises Off at the Phoenix Theatre and the Theatre Royal Haymarket. Many of her stage performances have been critically acclaimed. Kendal was appointed Commander of the Order of the British Empire (CBE) in the 1995 New Year Honours for services to drama.

== Early life ==
Felicity Ann Kendal was born on 25th September 1946 in Olton in Solihull, Warwickshire, England. She is the younger daughter of Laura Liddell and actor and manager Geoffrey Kendal. Her older sister, Jennifer Kendal, was also an actress.

After early years in Birmingham, Kendal lived in India with her family from the age of seven: her father was an English actor-manager who led his own repertory company on tours of India. The ensemble would perform plays from a repertoire including Shakespeare, George Bernard Shaw, and Richard Brinsley Sheridan to audiences that included schoolchildren, nuns, British expatriates, and royalty. As the family travelled, Kendal attended six different Loreto College convent schools in India, until the age of 13. She contracted typhoid fever in Calcutta at the age of 17.

Kendal made her stage debut for her family's company aged nine months, when she was carried on stage as the changeling boy in A Midsummer Night's Dream. Five years later she was the Changeling in the same play, and aged nine she was Macduff's son in a production of Macbeth. Her first speaking role was as Puck in A Midsummer Night's Dream when she was 12.

Kendal's family and their touring theatre company were the inspiration for the Merchant Ivory Productions film Shakespeare Wallah (1965), which follows the story of nomadic British actors as they perform Shakespeare plays in towns in post-colonial India. She played Lizzie Buckingham, the daughter of the company's actor-managers, who falls in love with the son of film star Manjula, portrayed by Madhur Jaffrey. Lizzie's parents face a dilemma between their deep-seated theatrical ambitions and their fears for the welfare of their daughter. The Observer film critic Kenneth Tynan wrote a positive review of the film, and considered that the role of the daughter was "fetchingly played by the dumpling-faced Felicity Kendal". Patrick Gibbs of The Daily Telegraph named Kendal as his actress of the year, and said that, based on her portrayal of Ophelia in an extract from Hamlet within the film, her performance of that role would "rank with any that [he had] seen".

Speaking to The Daily Telegraph journalist Jasper Rees in 2006, Kendal said that her time in India was "sometimes very hard, sometimes very poor, sometimes ghastly, ghastly, ghastly in all sorts of ways", she did not regret it, and that it was an "amazing way of living". She also felt that it prepared her for a career in theatre as she did not have any established expectations about how things should be. Aged 17, she moved to England, initially living with her aunt.

== Early television work ==
Kendal appeared in two episodes of Love Story in 1966, and as a teenage hippie in "The May Fly and the Frog", an episode of The Wednesday Play which starred John Gielgud, the same year. Her other early TV roles included parts in Man in a Suitcase (1967), The Tenant of Wildfell Hall (1968–69), The Woodlanders (1970) and Jason King (1972).

In 1975, she appeared as Princess Vicky in Edward the Seventh. In his article about Kendal for the Museum of Broadcast Communications Encyclopedia of Television, David Pickering wrote that in the early years of Kendal's television career, "Producers liked her girlish good looks and bubbly confidence and audiences also quickly warmed to her."

== The Good Life ==
Kendal had her big break on television with the BBC sitcom The Good Life, which started in 1975. She and Richard Briers starred as Barbara and Tom Good, a middle-class suburban couple who decide to quit the rat race and become self-sufficient, much to the consternation of their snooty but well-meaning neighbour Margo (Penelope Keith) and her down-to-earth husband Jerry Leadbetter (Paul Eddington). Kendal appeared in all 30 episodes, which extended over four series and two specials, until 1978. BBC Head of Comedy Jimmy Gilbert, who had commissioned The Good Life as a showcase for Briers, saw Kendal and Keith perform in the play The Norman Conquests and felt they would suit the roles of Barbara and Margo. Briers approached Kendal in her dressing room and suggested she read for the part. Kendal later recounted she was keen to get the part, both because she needed work and because she felt a rapport with Briers, who was already established, having appeared regularly in television shows since 1962. The show's producer John Howard Davies also went to see the play, and Kendal and Keith were both given parts. Eddington also had stage acting experience, and the show's co-writer Bob Larbey felt that having a cast of actors, rather than a comedian as a central figure, made writing episodes easier. In her 1988 book White Cargo, Kendal reflected that the lead actors' stage experience and their attitude "to be actors first and stars second" was an important factor in the show's success. She commented that from the beginning, "we slotted into a way of working together that was fun, fast and furious ... all extremely professional, ambitious and hard-working, and our dedication to the show was total." She also felt that Larbey and his co-writer John Esmonde tailored the scripts so that they were for the "actors and characters combined".

Although Barbara has her doubts about Tom's plans for self-sufficiency at first, she supports him emotionally and practically. The cultural historian Mark Lewisohn commented that it was obvious that Barbara and Tom "enjoy a great marriage, being fully attuned to one another's needs and desires". The British Film Institute's page about Kendal, written by Tise Vahimagi, argues that the four lead characters were relatable, "with Kendal standing out as the epitome of friendly suburban sexiness in her tight blue jeans". On the institute's page about The Good Life, Mark Duguid wrote that "Felicity Kendal's lively, sexy Barbara won her the adoration of millions of British men" in a very popular show that was a "gentle social satire of the suburban middle-class". For Pickering, Kendal's "whimsical, puckish charm and endearingly good-humoured outlook made her ideal for the role".

After a low-key start, the programme quickly became popular, attracting audiences of about 14 million for new episodes. By the last episode, Esmonde and Larbey felt that the main storylines had come to a natural end, and decided not to write further episodes. The last regular episode aired in May 1977 and was followed by a 1977 Christmas special. The cast reunited for a 1978 Royal Command Performance. It has often received repeated showings on the BBC, typically at prime viewing times, and the repeats have typically attracted high audiences.

The film and television studies scholars Frances Bonner and Jason Jacobs contended that although The Good Life was consistently a reference point across the coverage of later careers of each of the lead actors, this was most pronounced in the case of Kendal. Kendal has maintained that the character of Barbara Good is very dissimilar to her as a person. In a 2010 interview, she said of her close association with the character that "[The Good Life] is always on some channel or another. I think it's rather nice. It's following me like a good fairy." She added that while the other lead characters were like people that the viewers might know personally, Barbara "had all the ingredients – feisty, strong but adoring, up for anything, very funny – that people find attractive".

== Later television work ==
Davies was so impressed by the performances from Kendal, Keith and Eddington that when he was Head of Comedy for the BBC, he gave them all starring roles in new series: Yes Minister for Eddington, To The Manor Born for Keith, and Solo (1981–82) for Kendal. Carla Lane wrote Solo, in which Kendal played the lead role of Gemma Palmer, who decides to split from her boyfriend and live independently. Lane also wrote The Mistress (1985 and 1987) in which Kendal portrayed a florist having an affair with a married man, played by Jack Galloway in 1985 and with a different character played by Peter McEnery in the 1987 version. Both Solo and The Mistress were positively received, although some viewers were disappointed by the lack of innocence displayed by Kendal's character in The Mistress compared to that of the Barbara Good character. Bonner and Jacobs commented that "As Barbara, her sexiness was contained in the loving relationship with her husband, but her subsequent casting in the TV sitcoms Solo (1981–82) and The Mistress (1985–87) reveals even in their titles a making of her imaginatively available for the lustful viewer." The media scholar Mary Irwin considers that Kendal has avoided being typecast in roles of "acquiescent girlfriend or supportive wife", and that in Solo and The Mistress she "cut through commonplace binaries situating sitcom women as either bimbos or battleaxes".

The Camomile Lawn (1992) starred Kendal as Helena Cuthbertson, whose property encompassed a mansion and the lawn in the title. Eddington played her husband Richard. Attracting over seven million viewers, as of 2022 it remained the most-watched drama ever on Channel 4. However the 1994 sitcom Honey for Tea starring Kendal was later described by Maureen Paton of the Daily Telegraph as "an unmitigated flop". Her American accent in the show was mocked by TV critic and humourist Victor Lewis-Smith: "In a single phrase, she veered uncontrollably from the Bronx to South Africa via Surrey, like some linguistic Spruce Goose, awkwardly taking off only to crash-land again within moments."

Having focused on her theatre rather than her television career for some years following the poor reception to Honey for Tea, in 2003 Kendal co-starred with Pam Ferris in Rosemary & Thyme as a pair of gardeners and detectives. Kendal's character Rosemary Boxer is a university of Malmesbury lecturer in applied horticulture. The show was negatively reviewed, but still popular with viewers, becoming the most viewed new drama series on ITV1 in 2006. Vahimagi wrote that despite "pleasantly skittish performances" from the leads, the show was a "peculiarly dispiriting addition to the list of British detective drama".

== Stage work ==
Kendal auditioned unsuccessfully for Val May at the Bristol Old Vic in early 1966. Some months later, she auditioned for Tynan and Laurence Olivier National Theatre season at the Old Vic, again without success. She made her London stage debut in Minor Murder (1967) at the Savoy Theatre. Kendal and Tessa Wyatt played two friends who murdered the mother of one of them, in a play inspired by the Parker–Hulme murder case. She was cast as Amaryllis in the 1969 production of Back to Methuselah at the Old Vic.

In 1972, actors Ian McKellen and Edward Petherbridge, after discussion with director David William, formed the Actors' Company, a collective group with members invited by them. The actors would all receive equal pay and would rotate between leading and supporting roles, with posters listing their names in alphabetical order. The founding members were Caroline Blakiston, Marian Diamond, Robert Eddison, Robin Ellis, Tenniel Evans, Kendal, Matthew Long, Margery Mason, McKellen, Frank Middlemass, Juan Moreno, Petherbridge, Moira Redmond, Sheila Reid, Jack Shepherd, Ronnie Stevens and John Tordoff. As part of the company, Kendal played The Maid in Ruling the Roost, and Annabella in 'Tis Pity She's a Whore at the 1972 Edinburgh International Festival. Kendal had departed to look after her new baby by the time the group reconvened in mid-1973.

Kendal won the Variety Club's Best Stage Actress Award for her performance as Marain in Michael Frayn's Clouds (1978) at the Duke of York's Theatre, London.

In 1979 she was directed by Peter Hall for the first time, as Constanze Mozart in Amadeus. She later recounted that her experience in the production "taught me to focus on the play rather than the role". A recording with the original cast was broadcast on BBC Radio 3 in 1983. Her stage career blossomed during the 1980s and 1990s when she formed a close professional association with Tom Stoppard, starring in the first productions of many of his plays, including On the Razzle (1981), The Real Thing (1982), Hapgood (1988), and Arcadia (1993). The Stoppard scholar Paul Delaney wrote in 1990 that Kendal "first dazzled Stoppard audiences" in On the Razzle, and made Annie in The Real Thing a "poignant role". He felt that in Hapgood, Kendal gave a "towering performance in the most complex role Stoppard has ever written for a woman." In his 2002 biography of Stoppard, Ira Nadel remarked that "Hannah Jarvis in Arcadia is, perhaps, the quintessential Kendal role: energetic, inquisitive, strong and possessed with a touch of The Good Life's vibrant celebration of nature."

Kendal and Stoppard started a romantic relationship that lasted for eight years from around November 1990. His radio play In the Native State (1991) had a dedication "To Felicity Kendal", and, according to Delaney, it "seemed in some ways to be not only for and by but also about Kendal". It was adapted for the stage as Indian Ink (1995) and both versions starred Kendal as Flora Crewe, a poet who moves to India and develops a friendship with an artist played by Art Malik who paints her portrait. The Daily Telegraph critic Charles Spencer found Kendal's performance by turns "funny, mischievous" and "exceptionally touching". Stoppard also made a new translation of The Seagull by Anton Chekhov specifically so that Kendal could play Madame Arkadina (1997). In December 2025 Kendal returned to Indian Ink in the role of Mrs Swan, the sister of Flora who she had played in the original production. The later production opened in preview four days after Stoppard's death.

She won the Evening Standard Theatre Award in 1989 for her performances in Much Ado About Nothing and Ivanov. Gerard van Werson of The Stage wrote that as Beatrice in Much Ado About Nothing, Kendal "delights ... with her remarkable charm and her beautiful comic timing".

The critic Sheridan Morley felt that Kendal was "rapidly becoming our most expert player of classic farce" after seeing her in Mind Millie for Me, an adaptation of a Georges Feydeau farce at the Theatre Royal Haymarket, London in 1996. Later that year, Geoff Chapman of the Toronto Star described Kendal as "once a television sitcom star but now a huge West End draw in serious parts".

Her 2003 performance as Winnie in Happy Days by Samuel Beckett was acclaimed by The Guardian's Michael Billington, who praised Kendal for bringing a "genuine emotional reality" to the role. She starred as Esme in the West End revival of Amy's View (2006) by David Hare, which was her tenth collaboration with director Peter Hall. Hall's "sensitive direction" allowed Kendal to "resoundingly [achieve] both Esme's barbed humour and her sadness" according to Heather Neil of The Stage. She appeared in the West End as Florence Lancaster in Noël Coward's play The Vortex in 2008. In Variety, David Benedict felt that "playing her as a woman who overacts strains Kendal's ability to reveal truthful emotion in the final act".

In 2013, she starred in the first London revival of Relatively Speaking by Alan Ayckbourn at Wyndham's Theatre. Later that year, she toured the UK with Simon Callow in Chin-Chin, an English translation by Willis Hall of Francois Billetdoux's Tchin-Tchin. She toured the UK and Australia as Judith Bliss in Noël Coward's Hay Fever, which then played in the West End in 2015.

She took her first role in a musical as Evangeline Harcourt in the 2021 London revival of Anything Goes at the Barbican Theatre. In 2023, Kendal starred as Dotty Otley in Noises Off at the Phoenix Theatre and the Theatre Royal Haymarket. The Daily Telegraph reviewer Marianka Swain felt that Kendal was "more brilliant than ever" in the role.

== Other work ==
On radio, Kendal starred as Prudence in an adaptation of the eponymous novel by Jilly Cooper in 1979.

On the album Shape Up and Dance with Felicity Kendal (1982), Kendal narrated a keep-fit routine based around yoga and ballet. It spent 13 weeks in the top 40 of the UK Albums Chart, peaking at number 29 in 1983, and went on to sell over 200,000 copies.

In 1995, Kendal was one of the readers of Edward Lear poems on a spoken-word CD bringing together a collection of Lear's nonsense songs.

== Personal life ==
Kendal's first marriage to Drewe Henley (1968–1979) and her second to Michael Rudman (1983–1991) ended in divorce. Kendal has two sons, including Charley Henley. She reunited with Rudman in 1998, and they remained partners until he died on 30 March 2023.

Kendal was brought up in the Catholic faith. She converted to Judaism at the time of her second marriage, but has said about the conversion, "I felt I was returning to my roots." Her conversion took more than three years; she has stated that her decision to convert had "nothing to do" with her husband. Kendal's memoirs, titled White Cargo, were published in 1998.

Kendal was appointed Commander of the Order of the British Empire (CBE) in the 1995 New Year Honours for services to drama. She is an ambassador for the charity Royal Voluntary Service, previously known as WRVS.

== Selected filmography ==
=== Theatre ===
Kendal's first two-stage appearances were for her family's company, in England. Having played a changeling boy in A Midsummer Night's Dream when she was nine months old, she was the Changeling in the same play five years later. After the company returned to Asia, her roles included Macduff's son in Macbeth, Puck in A Midsummer Night's Dream, Jessica in The Merchant of Venice, Ophelia in Hamlet, and Viola in Twelfth Night.

Year	Title	Role	Venue	Ref.
1967	Minor Murder	Carla	Savoy Theatre, London	
1968	Henry V	Katherine	Phoenix Theatre, Leicester	
1968	The Promise	Lika	Phoenix Theatre, Leicester	
1969	Back to Methuselah, Part II	Amaryllis	National Theatre Company, The Old Vic, London	
1970	A Midsummer Night's Dream	Hermia	Regent's Park Open Air Theatre, London	
1970	Much Ado about Nothing	Hero	Regent's Park Open Air Theatre, London	
1970	The Lord Byron Show		Regent's Park Open Air Theatre, London	
1970–71	Kean	Anne Danby	Oxford Playhouse/Globe Theatre, London	
1972	Ruling the Roost	The Maid	Billingham Forum Theatre/Edinburgh International Festival	
1972	'Tis Pity She's a Whore	Annabella	Edinburgh International Festival	
1972	The Three Arrows		Cambridge Arts Theatre	
1972	Romeo and Juliet	Juliet	Oxford Playhouse	
1973	Friends, Romans and Lovers	Alison Ames	Yvonne Arnaud Theatre, Guildford	
1974	The Norman Conquests	Annie	Greenwich Theatre/Globe Theatre, London	
1976	Once Upon a Time	Vitoshka	Little Theatre, Bristol	
1978	Clouds	Mara	Duke of York's Theatre, London	
1978	Arms and the Man	Raina	Greenwich Theatre, London	
1979	Amadeus	Constanze	National Theatre, London	
1980	Othello	Desdemona	National Theatre, London	
1981–82	On the Razzle	Christopher	National Theatre, London	
1981–82	The Second Mrs Tanqueray	Paula	National Theatre, London	
1982–83	The Real Thing	Annie	Strand Theatre, London	
1985	Jumpers	Dorothy	Aldwych Theatre, London	
1986	Made in Bangkok	Frances	Aldwych Theatre, London	
1988	Hapgood	Hapgood	Aldwych Theatre, London	
1989	Ivanov	Anna Ivanov	Strand Theatre, London	
1989	Much Ado about Nothing	Beatrice	Strand Theatre, London	
1990	Hidden Laughter		Vaudeville Theatre, London	
1991	Tartuffe	Ariade Utterword	Theatre Royal Haymarket, London	
1992	Heartbreak House		Theatre Royal Haymarket, London	
1993	Arcadia	Hannah Jarvis	National Theatre, London	
1994	An Absolute Turkey		Globe Theatre, London	
1995	Indian Ink	Flora Crewe	Aldwych Theatre, London	
1996	Mind Millie for Me		Theatre Royal Haymarket, London	
1997	The Seagull	Madame Arkadina	The Old Vic, London	
1997	Waste	Amy O'Connell	The Old Vic, London	
1998	Alarms and Excursions		Gielgud Theatre, London	
2000	Fallen Angels	Julia	Apollo Theatre, London	
2002	Humble Boy	Flora	Gielgud Theatre, London	
2003	Happy Days	Winnie	Arts Theatre, London	
2006	Amy's View	Esme	Garrick Theatre, London	
2008	The Vortex	Florence	Apollo Theatre, London	
2009	The Last Cigarette	Simon Gray	Chichester Festival Theatre/Trafalgar Studios, London	
2010	Mrs. Warren's Profession	Mrs. Warren	Comedy Theatre, London	
2013	Relatively Speaking	Sheila	Wyndham's Theatre, London	
2013	Chin Chin	Pamela Pusey-Picq	Touring	
2015	Hay Fever	Judith Bliss	Duke of York's Theatre, London	
2016	A Room with a View	Charlotte Bartlett	Theatre Royal, Bath	
2017	Lettice and Lovage	Lettice Douffet	Menier Chocolate Factory, London	
2019	The Argument	Chloe	Theatre Royal, Bath	
2021	Anything Goes	Evangeline Harcourt	Barbican Theatre, London	
2023	Noises Off	Dotty Otley	Phoenix Theatre/Theatre Royal Haymarket, London	
2024	Filumena	Filumena	Theatre Royal Windsor/UK tour	
2025	Indian Ink	Mrs Swan	Hampstead Theatre, London	
2026	High Society	Mother Lord	Barbican Theatre, London	

=== Television ===
Year	Title	Role	Notes	Ref.
1966	Love Story	The Turkish Cypriot girl	Episode: "Another Name from Nowhere"	
1966	Love Story	Jenny	Episode: "A Toy Soldier"	
1966	The Wednesday Play	The girl	Episode: "The May Fly and the Frog"	
1967	ITV Play of the Week	Beth Gray	Episode: "Person Unknown"	
1967	Boy Meets Girl	Mina	Episode: "Love with a Few Hairs"	
1967	Thirty-Minute Theatre	La Principessa	Episode: "Come Death"	
1967	Half Hour Story	Candy	Episode: "Gone and Never Called Me Mother"	
1968	Man in a Suitcase	Marcelle	Episode: "Blind Spot"	
1968	The Easter Play	Eleonora	Episode: Strindberg's Easter	
1968–69	The Tenant of Wildfell Hall	Rose		
1970	The Woodlanders	Grace Melbury		
1972	Jason King	Toki	Episode: "Toki"	
1973	Dolly	Dolly	3 episodes	
1975	Edward the Seventh (Note: also known as Edward the King and The Royal Victorians)	Princess Vicky	7 episodes	
1975–78	The Good Life	Barbara Good		
1976	Call My Bluff	panelist		
1976	Going for a Song			
1976	ITV Sunday Night Drama	Nicola	Episode: "Now Is Too Late"	
1976	Murder	Jane	Episode: "A Variety of Passion"	
1977	Night of 100 Stars			
1978	A Play for Love	Cressida Bell	Episode: "The Marriage Counsellor"	
1978	ITV Playhouse	Victoria	Episode: "Home and Beauty"	
1978	Clouds of Glory	Dorothy Wordsworth	2 episodes	
1980	BBC Television Shakespeare	Viola	Episode: Twelfth Night	
1981	Friday Night, Saturday Morning	Guest		
1981	The Theatre Quiz			
1981–82	Solo	Gemma Palmer		
1983	The Morecambe & Wise Show		Christmas Special	
1984	The Wandering Company	actress, Shakespeare Wallah	Documentary	
1985-1987	The Mistress	Maxine		
1986	Wogan	Guest host		
1986	On the Razzle	Christopher		
1992	The Camomile Lawn	Helena		
1992	Shakespeare: The Animated Tales: Romeo and Juliet	Narrator		
1993	The Full Wax			
1994	Honey for Tea	Nancy Belasco		
1995	The World of Peter Rabbit and Friends	Voice of Hunca Munca	Episode: "The Tale of Two Bad Mice and Johnny Town-Mouse"	
1996	French and Saunders			
1998	Clive Anderson All Talk			
1999	Loose Women			
2000	How Proust Can Change Your Life	Narrator		
2001	Funny Turns, Felicity Kendal: A Passage from India			
2001	Top Ten: Sex Bombs			
2003	Friday Night with Jonathan Ross			
2003–2006	Rosemary & Thyme	Rosemary Boxer		
2005	The South Bank Show		Episode: "Peter Hall – 50 Years in Theatre: Part 2"	
2006	The Kumars at No. 42			
2006	The Paul O'Grady Show			
2008	Richard & Judy			
2008	The Alan Titchmarsh Show			
2008	Arena		Episode: "Paul Scofield"	
2008	Doctor Who	Lady Clemency Eddison	Episode: "The Unicorn and the Wasp"	
2010	Strictly Come Dancing (series 8)	contestant	partnered with Vincent Simone	
2010	The ONE Show			
2010	BBC Breakfast			
2012	Felicity Kendal's Indian Shakespeare Quest			
2012	Piers Morgan's Life Stories	guest		
2017	Inside No.9	Patricia	Episode: "Private View"	
2019	Pennyworth	Baroness Ortsey	Episode: "Cilla Black"	
2024	Ludwig	Lady Camilla Bryce	1 episode	
2024	Rivals	Carole Miroy	1 episode	
2026	Small Town Scandal	Sue		

=== Film work ===
Year	Title	Role	Comments	Ref.
1965	Shakespeare Wallah	Lizzie Buckingham		
1977	Valentino	June Mathis		
1993	We're Back! A Dinosaur's Story	Elsa (voice)		
1999	Parting Shots	Jill Saunders		
2026	Frank and Percy †		Post-production	

== Awards ==
Year	Award	Category	Details	Result	Ref.
1974	Variety Club	Most Promising Artiste	The Norman Conquests	Won	
1979	Variety Club	Best Actress	Marain, Clouds	Won	
1980	Clarence Derwent Award	Best supporting actress	Constanza Mozart, Amadeus	Won	
1984	Variety Club	Woman of the Year		Won	
1984	Variety Club	Best Actress		Won	
1989	Evening Standard Theatre Awards	Best Performance by an Actress	Much Ado About Nothing and Ivanov	Won	
