= Harry Rabinowitz =

South African composer (1916–2016)

Harry Rabinowitz MBE
- Born: 26 March 1916; Johannesburg, Union of South Africa
- Died: 22 June 2016 (aged 100); Lacoste, Vaucluse, France
- Occupations: Conductor, composer
- Spouses: Lorna Anderson (m. 1944–2000); Mary C. Scott (m. 2001–2016)
- Children: 3

Harry Rabinowitz (26 March 1916 – 22 June 2016) was a South African-British conductor and composer of film and television music. Born in Johannesburg, South Africa, he was the son of Israel and Eva Rabinowitz. He was educated at the University of the Witwatersrand and at London's Guildhall School of Music and Drama.

== Career ==
Rabinowitz's musical career began as a six-week stint playing sheet music for potential customers in a Johannesburg department store. His first job conducting an orchestra was for a show called Strike a New Note in 1945, using a rolled-up newspaper as a baton. Rabinowitz left Johannesburg for England in 1946 to study conducting.

He was conductor of the BBC Revue Orchestra (1953–60), music director for BBC Television Light Entertainment (1960–68), and head of music for London Weekend Television (1968–77). He conducted at the Hollywood Bowl (1983–84) and the Boston Pops Orchestra (1985–92) and with the London Symphony Orchestra and the Royal Philharmonic Orchestra. He was the conductor at the Orchestra of St. Luke's Ismail Merchant and James Ivory 35th anniversary celebration at Carnegie Hall on 17 September 1996.

Rabinowitz conducted film scores, including Hanover Street (1979), Chariots of Fire (1981), Heat and Dust (1983), The Bostonians (1984), Return to Oz (1985), Lady Jane (1986), Maurice (1987), The Remains of the Day (1993), The English Patient (1996), The Talented Mr. Ripley (1999), and Cold Mountain (2003). Rabinowitz also composed for television, including The Frost Report (1966), I, Claudius (1976) and The Agatha Christie Hour (1982).

He appeared onscreen in the television programme Top C's and Tiaras.

In June 2015, Rabinowitz was the guest castaway on BBC Radio 4's Desert Island Discs.

== Personal life ==
On 15 December 1944, Rabinowitz married firstly Lorna Thurlow Anderson. The couple divorced in 2000. On 18 March 2001, he married secondly Mary (Mitzi) C. Scott.

Rabinowitz reached 100 years of age on 26 March 2016. He died on 22 June 2016 at his home in Lacoste, Vaucluse, France. Rabinowitz continued to play the piano every day until his death.

== Other sources ==
- Debrett's People of Today. Debrett's Peerage Ltd, 2008.
- Marquis Who's Who, 2008.
- Strauss, Neil, "Lush Odes to the Art of Two Film Makers", in The New York Times, 19 September 1996, p. C16.
