= The Good Life (1975 TV series) =

British TV sitcom (1975–1978)

- Opening credits of The Good Life
- Genre: Sitcom
- Created by: John Esmonde and Bob Larbey
- Starring: Richard Briers; Felicity Kendal; Penelope Keith; Paul Eddington
- Theme music composer: Burt Rhodes
- Country of origin: United Kingdom
- Original language: English
- No. of series: 4
- No. of episodes: 30 (list of episodes)

Production
- Producer: John Howard Davies
- Running time: 30 minutes
- Production company: BBC

Original release
- Network: BBC1
- Release: 4 April 1975 – 10 June 1978

Related
- Life Beyond the Box: Margo Leadbetter

The Good Life (known as Good Neighbors in the United States) is a British sitcom, produced by BBC television. It ran from 4 April 1975 to 10 June 1978 on BBC1 and was written by John Esmonde and Bob Larbey. Opening with the midlife crisis of Tom Good, a 40-year-old plastics designer, it relates the joys and setbacks he and his wife Barbara experience when they attempt to escape a modern "rat race" lifestyle by "becoming totally self-sufficient" in their suburban house in Surbiton. In 2004, it came ninth in Britain's Best Sitcom. The lead roles are taken by Richard Briers and Felicity Kendal.

== Background ==
John Esmonde and Bob Larbey wrote The Good Life for Richard Briers, the only cast member who was well known before the series was broadcast. Larbey and Esmonde were inspired by Larbey's 40th birthday, which seemed to them a milestone in most people's lives. Their story has the Goods' decision to pursue self-sufficiency conflicting sharply with the habits of the Leadbetters, who live next door. The conflict between the neighbours, balanced with an increasingly close friendship, creates comic tension as that friendship is tried to its limits.

Peter Bowles was originally cast to play Jerry, but was unavailable. (He later starred opposite Penelope Keith in To the Manor Born.) Hannah Gordon was considered for the role of Barbara, but was ruled out, having recently played a similar role in the BBC sitcom My Wife Next Door. Esmonde and Larbey chose Felicity Kendal and Penelope Keith after seeing them on stage together in The Norman Conquests.

Outdoor filming took place in the north London suburb of Northwood, although the story was set in Surbiton, a different suburb in south-west London. The producers searched extensively for a suitable pair of houses, eventually chancing on Kewferry Road, Northwood. The grounds of the Goods' house were returned to their original state after the filming of each series' inserts, and all livestock removed at the end of each day's filming. Interior scenes were filmed at BBC Television Centre in front of a live audience.

The opening theme was composed by Burt Rhodes (1923–2003).

== Cast ==
- Richard Briers – Tom Good
- Felicity Kendal – Barbara Good
- Penelope Keith – Margo Leadbetter (née Sturgess)
- Paul Eddington – Jeremy "Jerry" Leadbetter
- Reginald Marsh – Andrew, "Sir"
- Moyra Fraser – Felicity, Sir's wife (series 1)
- Charmian May – Mrs Weaver (series 2)

== Plot ==
On his 40th birthday, Tom Good is no longer able to take his job seriously and gives up work as a draughtsman for a company that makes plastic toys for breakfast cereal packets. With their house in The Avenue, Surbiton, paid for, he and his wife Barbara adopt a sustainable, simple and nearly self-sufficient lifestyle while staying in their house. They turn their front and back gardens into allotments, growing soft fruit and vegetables. They introduce chickens, pigs (Pinky and Perky), a goat (Geraldine) and a cockerel (Lenin). They generate their own electricity with methane from animal waste, and attempt to make their own clothes. They sell or barter surplus crops for essentials they cannot make themselves. They cut their monetary requirements to the minimum, with varying success.

Their actions horrify their kindly but conventional neighbours, Margo and Jerry Leadbetter. Margo and Jerry were intended to be minor characters, but their relationship with one another and the Goods became an essential element of the series. Under the influence of the Goods' homemade wine, called "peapod Burgundy" (the strength of which becomes a running joke), their intermingled attractions to one another become apparent.

== Characters ==
=== Tom Good ===
Tom's career has been as a draughtsman at JJM, a job he thoroughly dislikes. He feels his life is meaningless, nothing more than work and consumption. Becoming self-sufficient is his idea, but Barbara, after expressing concerns, supports him. Tom is determined to succeed at self-sufficiency, and is mostly cheerful about his new lifestyle. Despite being an eternal optimist most of the time, Tom can also be obstinate and pigheaded, often to Barbara's detriment or irritation. On the few occasions that he is pessimistic, Barbara becomes the optimist.

=== Barbara Good ===
Barbara is a normal, middle-class housewife when the series begins. While she sometimes wilts under Tom's determined and dominant nature, her sharp tongue puts her on an equal footing. She is the heart of the enterprise, while Tom's engineering brain designs and builds what they need. She occasionally misses the luxuries but her own determination to succeed, with Tom's single-minded persuasion, keeps her going.

=== Jerry Leadbetter ===
Jerry works for JJM, having joined the same day as Tom, although the two men knew each other for at least two years before they went to work for the same company. By his own account, Jerry has risen to senior management through cunning and self-promotion rather than ability – he tells Tom directly that he has only 10% of Tom's talent. As the series progresses, he moves within striking distance of the managing director's job. Jerry is convinced that the Goods' go-it-alone attempt will fail and on several occasions pleads with Tom to come back. But he grows to appreciate the character it has taken for Tom to leave the system. He is henpecked at home but has the strength to make his case.

=== Margaret "Margo" Leadbetter ===
Margaret, often called "Margo" by friends and family, cannot understand her neighbours' lifestyle, but their friendship is important to her. As a child, she was bullied at school for having no sense of humour. A social climber, staunchly Conservative and unafraid to challenge anyone who gets on her nerves, Margo nevertheless reveals a heart of gold. She involves herself with organisations such as the pony club and the music society, always wishing to play the lead role, although frequently the Goods' activities frustrate her attempts to impress her social circle. Margo is occasionally made aware of her faults by others, including her husband, and is not too proud to apologise.

=== Andrew and Felicity ===
Andrew, "Andy" or "Sir", is managing director of JJM. He feigns ignorance of Tom's existence ("Mr Ummm of the Fourth Floor"), but once Tom leaves, Andy becomes desperate to bring him back. His wife, Felicity, is more relaxed. She is one of the few characters to support the Goods and finds their attempt at self-sufficiency exciting. She says, "I wanted to do something exciting when I was young, and then I met Andrew and that was the end of that." They have one son, unseen, called Martin. Andrew calls Tom and Barbara "Tim and Fatima", but in the episode "Anniversary" admits he has always known their names and pretends to forget – "an old executive ploy to put people at a disadvantage." Felicity doesn't appear after series 1, with one more reference to her by Jerry and Margo in the episode "Mutiny".

=== Mrs Weaver ===
Mrs Weaver buys the house next door to Tom and Barbara in series 2, much to the relief of Margo, who approves of Mrs Weaver's conservative values as opposed to the two students lodging with the Goods who had threatened to purchase the house. Initially, the Goods and Mrs Weaver have an embarrassing introduction to each other, but when Mrs Weaver is impressed by the pottery skills of Tom, they become friendly. Mrs Weaver's enthusiasm for Tom's pottery encourages him to take up making ceramics, but he baulks at the idea of doing it professionally. Mrs Weaver continues to be mentioned, but is not seen again. In series 4 it is revealed she has moved away, leaving the house empty, but with a half-full tank of heating oil in the garden. The Goods telephone her and she agrees to them taking the oil, but they discover the leaking tank has destroyed their garden.

=== Unseen characters ===
Several characters are mentioned but unseen. Margo is often at odds with Miss Dolly Mountshaft, dictatorial leading light of the music society. The overweight Mrs Dooms-Paterson is an equally dictatorial acquaintance and a fellow member of the pony club. Mr and Mrs Pearson, the Leadbetters' gardener and housekeeper, are mentioned in several episodes. Mr Weaver, the husband of Mrs Weaver, is mentioned but not met in episode 6 of series 2, when Margo speaks of Mr and Mrs Weaver.

== Episodes ==
Series	Episodes	Originally released		
Series	Episodes	First released	Last released	Network
1	7	4 April 1975	16 May 1975	BBC 1
2	7	5 December 1975	23 January 1976	BBC 1
3	7	10 September 1976	22 October 1976	BBC 1
4	7	10 April 1977	22 May 1977	BBC 1
Christmas Special		26 December 1977		BBC 1
Royal Command Performance		10 June 1978		BBC 1

The Good Life aired for four series and two specials from 4 April 1975 to 10 June 1978. The final one-off episode, "When I'm Sixty-Five", was a Royal Command Performance in front of Queen Elizabeth II, Prince Philip, Duke of Edinburgh and senior BBC management. The cast and crew were presented to the Queen and Prince Philip after the recording. The episode was originally broadcast in a 45-minute slot with footage either side of the 30-minute episode showing the royal party entering and exiting. The performance came about after the BBC invited the Queen to attend a recording of a television programme for the first time to mark her Silver Jubilee and to this end, the royal household was asked to confirm her favourite entertainment show. Reputedly, this was The Good Life, but this was problematic as the series had ended before it was possible to facilitate the Queen's attendance. Thus a 'Christmas Special' episode was commissioned, but it proved impossible for the Queen's schedule to accommodate the recording and a further subsequent episode was commissioned, although this was not recorded until 1978, after the jubilee year. Despite being informed that The Good Life was the Queen's favourite, when Felicity Kendal's son presented her with a bouquet upon her arrival at Television Centre, the Queen asked, "Who is Felicity Kendal?"

== Novelisations ==
Two novelisations of The Good Life were written by Esmonde and Larbey. The first, The Good Life, was published in 1976 by Penguin Books, and novelised the first series. The second, More of The Good Life, was published in 1977, also by Penguin, and featured three episodes from series two and four episodes from series three.

== Other countries ==
The series broadcast in Australia on ABC and in Canada on CBC. It was also seen in South Africa, Zimbabwe, New Zealand and many other Commonwealth countries as well as Belgium and the Netherlands.

In the United States The Good Life was retitled Good Neighbors to avoid confusion with a short-lived American sitcom of the same name, and was shown by most PBS stations across the country starting in the early 1980s. By the late 1980s, it was rarely seen, but returned to PBS stations after CBS/Fox Video released selected episodes on VHS in 1998.

== After The Good Life ==
After the success of The Good Life, the four main cast members were given their own vehicles, commissioned by the then head of comedy and producer of The Good Life, John Howard Davies. Immediately after the series ended, Larbey and Esmonde created The Other One for Richard Briers, co-starring Michael Gambon. It was a seven-part sitcom that aired on BBC1 in the autumn of 1977, running concurrently with The Good Life Christmas Special – Silly, but it's fun. A second series of six episodes aired in early 1979. Keith starred alongside Peter Bowles in To the Manor Born, which began in September 1979. Eddington joined Nigel Hawthorne and Derek Fowlds in Yes Minister and its sequel Yes Prime Minister. Kendal, who had become something of a sex symbol, went on to join Elspet Gray in Solo, Jane Asher in The Mistress and Pam Ferris in Rosemary & Thyme. Briers later starred alongside Penelope Wilton and Peter Egan in the sitcom Ever Decreasing Circles, again written by Larbey and Esmonde, in which Briers' character was the polar opposite of Tom Good. In 1992, Kendal and Eddington reunited in the Channel Four adaptation of Mary Wesley's The Camomile Lawn.

In 2003, the BBC broadcast the mockumentary Life Beyond the Box: Margo Leadbetter, describing Margo's life since the series had finished, although the original actors appear only in archive footage. In 2007, Briers and Kendal were reunited on ITV1 series That's What I Call Television in a mockup of the Goods' kitchen.

=== In popular culture ===
The Good Life features in an episode of The Young Ones titled "Sick" where Vyvyan (played by Adrian Edmondson) rips apart the title page after the first 10 seconds of the opening credits of this show while criticising it, saying, "It's so bloody nice! Felicity 'Treacle' Kendal and Richard 'Sugar-Flavoured Snot' Briers! What do they do now?! Chocolate bloody button ads, that's what! They're nothing but a couple of reactionary stereotypes, confirming the myth that everyone in Britain is a lovable middle-class eccentric. And I hate them!"

Giles Coren and Sue Perkins worked together on a four-episode BBC series Giles and Sue Live the Good Life, broadcast in 2010 to celebrate the 35th anniversary of the original series. In the series, they recreated an attempt by two city-dwellers to adjust to country life, in ways such as raising their own barnyard animals, creating their own Christmas decorations and knitting their own clothing.

In late 2020, a podcast celebrating sitcoms of the 1970s – The Sitcom Archive Deep Dive Overdrive — was launched. The weekly show examines and celebrates every episode ever made of The Good Life made throughout its first series.

Some have connected the increasing popularity of hobby farms to the success of TV shows like The Good Life.

== Home media ==
The complete series of The Good Life was made available in the US (Region 1) under the title Good Neighbors. Series 1–3 were released as a box set in 2005; Series 4 was released in 2006 and includes the Royal Command Performance.

The first UK (Region 2) DVD release omits two episodes (the last episode from series 1 and the Christmas special from series 4). All four complete series were rereleased in their entirety on 29 March, 24 May, 19 July and 20 September 2010; the complete boxset has also been rereleased.

All four series have been released in their entirety in Australia (Region 4), albeit in NTSC format rather than the PAL format typical in Australia. The series 4 release (on two DVDs) also contains an interview with Briers as well as the Royal Command Performance episode.

	Region 4
Series 1	1 October 2005
Series 2	6 April 2006
Series 3	7 September 2006
Series 4	4 April 2007
The Complete Collection	9 August 2017

== Stage adaptation ==
A stage adaptation of the sitcom premiered at the Theatre Royal, Bath, before embarking on a UK tour in October 2021. It was written and directed by Jeremy Sams and starred Rufus Hound as Tom Good.

== See also ==
- British sitcom
