= Honey for Tea =

British sitcom television series

- Genre: Sitcom
- Starring: Felicity Kendal; Nigel Le Vaillant; Leslie Phillips; Patrick McCollough; Caroline Harker
- Country of origin: United Kingdom
- Original language: English
- No. of series: 1
- No. of episodes: 7

Production
- Running time: 30 minutes

Original release
- Network: BBC1
- Release: 13 March – 24 April 1994

Honey for Tea is a British sitcom that aired on BBC1 in 1994. Starring Felicity Kendal, it was written by Michael Aitkens. The series was poorly received at the time, receiving a particularly scathing review from Victor Lewis-Smith in the London Evening Standard. He later described Felicity Kendal's attempt at an American accent as "Britain's revenge" for Dick Van Dyke's cockney accent in Mary Poppins.

== Cast ==
- Felicity Kendal – Nancy Belasco
- Nigel Le Vaillant – Prof. Simon Latimer
- Leslie Phillips – Sir Dickie Hobhouse
- Patrick McCollough – Jake Belasco
- Caroline Harker – The Hon. Lucy Courtney
- Alan David – Dr. Basil Quinn
- Tess Dignan – Jill McSweeney
- Crispin Bonham-Carter – Charlie Chadwick
- Helena Little – Prof. Debbie Newman
- Brenda Bruce – Mary Harris
- Bernard Lawrence – Lord St Clair
- April Walker – Lady St Clair

== Plot ==
On the death of her husband Harry, a Los Angeles businessman, American Nancy Belasco and her son Jake are insolvent. Much of his money is invested in St Maud's College at Cambridge University, a university he loved. So Nancy, who was born in Cambridge as the child of a GI bride, and Jake decide to go and live in Cambridge. Using her late husband's clout, Nancy gets a job as an assistant bursar, persuading the master of the college, Sir Dickie Hobhouse, to admit Jake on a sports scholarship. This leads to clashes between Nancy and Professor Simon Latimer, who knows Jake doesn't have the academic prowess to warrant his place. Meanwhile, in a culture clash romance, Jake becomes involved with the aristocratic Hon. Lucy Courtney.

== Episodes ==
1. Episode One (13 March 1994)
2. Episode Two (20 March 1994)
3. Episode Three (27 March 1994)
4. Episode Four (3 April 1994)
5. Episode Five (17 April 1994)
6. Episode Six (24 April 1994)
7. Episode Seven (1 May 1994)
