= Jack Galloway =

Scottish film and television actor (born 1947)

- Born: Jack Stewart Galloway; 14 May 1947 (age 79); Kilwinning, North Ayrshire, Scotland
- Occupations: Film and television actor

Jack Stewart Galloway (born 14 May 1947) is a Scottish film and television actor. He is best known for playing Robert Mackenzie in the British drama television series Mackenzie.

== Early life ==
Galloway was the son of a builder. In his early years, he travelled to Canada and Australia before returning to Great Britain to live in Somerset. Upon leaving school, he travelled around the world in a variety of jobs including being a painter, postman, seaman in the Dutch Merchant Navy and working in a bottle factory and clothes shop. It was while working as a waiter in a London restaurant frequented by actors from TV studios that inspired Galloway to become an actor. After speaking with the clients, he attended an audition at the Royal Central School of Speech and Drama with a speech from The Hasty Heart and was instantly accepted. His debut came at the 1971 Edinburgh International Festival in The Private Memoirs and Confessions of a Justified Sinner leading to working in repertory theatres across Britain for the next eight years. Galloway's talents were soon noticed by BBC producers, leading to a career in television.

== Career ==
In 1985, he starred as Luke Carpenter in the first series of the BBC2 sitcom television series The Mistress. He guest-starred in television programmes including Doctor Who (as Joseph Willow), Crown Court, Bergerac, The Ruth Rendell Mysteries, Agatha Christie's Poirot and Highlander: The Series. He played the recurring role of Jack Nesbit in the BBC crime drama television series The Paradise Club, and the recurring role of Inspector Janvier in the ITV crime drama television series Maigret. He also appeared in films such as A Bridge Too Far, Dirty Weekend, Mrs Dalloway and Foreign Body. In 1990, he appeared in the BBC Wales production I Used To Live Here Before I Was Born.

Galloway retired from acting in 2018, last appearing in the film A Reel Life.

== Personal life ==
In 1980, Galloway married landscape artist Tessa Perceval. They have a son, John J. Galloway, who works in visual effects and has been credited on movies including Avengers: Age of Ultron, Jurassic World: Fallen Kingdom and various Star Wars entries. The couple live in Herefordshire, where he has battled bowel cancer.
