= Solo (TV series) =

- Genre: Sitcom
- Created by: Carla Lane
- Starring: Felicity Kendal; Elspet Gray; Stephen Moore; Michael Howe
- Country of origin: United Kingdom
- Original language: English
- No. of series: 2
- No. of episodes: 13

Production
- Producer: Gareth Gwenlan
- Running time: 30 minutes

Original release
- Network: BBC1
- Release: 11 January 1981 – 17 October 1982
- Release: 10 March 1989

Solo is a British sitcom that aired on BBC1 from 1981 to 1982. Starring Felicity Kendal, Solo was written by Carla Lane, a writer well known for having previously written the sitcom Butterflies.

Kendal plays Gemma Palmer, a woman who changes her life after discovering her live-in boyfriend has had an affair.

== Production ==
Following the success of the BBC sitcom The Good Life, each of its four main stars was given their own programme with them as the lead, and Solo was Kendal's. Similar to Carla Lane's sitcom Butterflies, Solo has serious themes and plots but still has humour. The programme was produced by Gareth Gwenlan. The theme music was the theme from Op. 107 no. 7 by Beethoven, a set of flute and piano variations on the Ukrainian folk song Minka.

== Cast ==
- Felicity Kendal as Gemma Palmer
- Stephen Moore as Danny Tyrrell (series 1)
- Elspet Gray as Mrs. Elizabeth Palmer
- Sarah Bullen as Julia
- Debbie Wheeler as Josie (series 1)
- Stella Goodier as Bernadette (series 1)
- Michael Howe as Sebastian Bale (series 2)
- Belinda Mayne as Rosie (series 2)
- David Rintoul as Rex Collins (series 2)
- Peter Howitt as Raif

== Plot ==
=== Series One ===
When 30-year-old Gemma Palmer discovers that her live-in boyfriend Danny Tyrrell has been having an affair with her best friend Gloria, she chucks him out of her flat and quits her office job. The incident makes Gemma realise that she was being treated as a doormat by her friends and colleagues, and gets rid of all her old friends. She then tries to change herself into a stronger person, but she is unable to change her core beliefs and remains very emotional. Despite splitting from Danny, they remain friends, and he wants them to get back together. Danny and Gemma briefly live together towards the end of the series, but after one week she asks him to leave, saying she wants to be single again.

Gemma's traditional-thinking mother is the widowed 55-year-old Mrs. Palmer, whose husband Arnold died after 30 years of marriage and three children. She would like Gemma to settle down, marry and have children, like she did, but Gemma wants more out of life. During the series, she starts a relationship with a 35-year-old man, the unseen Howard.

The flat above Gemma's is occupied by two flat-sharing 20-somethings; blonde Josie, a petrol pump attendant, and Bernadette, a nurse. Josie is constantly worrying and talking about her current boyfriend, and later becomes pregnant by the unseen Geoffrey. Bernadette meanwhile has little luck with men. At the end of the series, Josie and Geoffrey get a bedsit together.

=== Series Two ===
The second series begins six months after Gemma told Danny to leave and she is now 31 years old. Happily living alone, she has a brief relationship with 19-year-old Raif before meeting Sebastian Bale, a philanderer who lives in the flat above her. The night they meet, they sleep together but after that, they become good friends and breakfasting together most mornings. Towards the end of the series, Sebastian begins to grow ever closer to Rosie, whom he met a party. Rosie soon separates from her partner, artist Rex Collins, and he and Gemma then start seeing each other. The series ends with Sebastian and Rosie engaged, with he having to reluctantly end the daily breakfast he enjoyed with Gemma. Gemma, meanwhile, appears to separate from Rex after arguing about her future domestic role if they get married.

Gemma's mother, Mrs. Palmer, whose first name is revealed as Elizabeth, continues her relationship with the younger Howard. She continues to wish that Gemma would settle down, and after one argument she and Gemma meet less often to give Gemma her own space. As the series ends, Mrs. Palmer goes through the menopause but Howard sticks by her, despite her worries.

== Episodes ==
Solo aired for two series from 11 January 1981 to 17 October 1982, and each of the thirteen episodes is thirty minutes long. When originally aired, the episodes were broadcast on Sunday evenings on BBC1. On 10 March 1989, seven years after the last episode aired, a Comic Relief special short episode, "The Last Waltz", aired on BBC1. Written especially by Carla Lane, it features characters from four of Lane's sitcoms; Solo, Butterflies, Bread and The Liver Birds.

=== Series One (1981) ===
No.	Title	Original release date
1	"Episode One"	11 January 1981
When her boyfriend Danny sleeps with her best friend Gloria (Susan Bishop), Gemma throws Danny out of her flat and quits her office job. Her mother, who would like her to settle down and have a family, despairs when Gemma says she wants more out of her life. She then goes and gets three new jobs, quitting them in all in quick succession. After two weeks apart, Danny asks her to marry him, but she turns him down. Meanwhile, Josie waits unsuccessfully for her latest boyfriend to ring.
2	"Episode Two"	18 January 1981
Gemma has an interview to be a social worker, and the interviewer advises her do voluntary social work first at the Citizens Advice Bureau. Her mother strongly advises against it, but Gemma does so anyway. During her first session, working with Mrs Dean (Josie Kidd), Danny comes in and tells Mrs Dean and Gemma about his problems. Meanwhile, Josie wonders what to wear on her date with her new boyfriend and eventually decides not to go.
3	"Episode Three"	25 January 1981
After a day at the Citizens Advice Bureau with Mrs Dean (Josie Kidd), Gemma gets home to find Danny in her bed. They talk and are just about to embrace when the telephone rings. Gemma answers; it is Julia, her friend, who has just seen her husband in bed with another woman and wants to stay the night at Gemma's, meaning Danny has to leave. Meanwhile, Josie discovers she is pregnant by her new boyfriend Jeffrey.
4	"Episode Four"	1 February 1981
Gemma has her first case as a social worker, a Mr and Mrs Thompson (John Rudling and Rose Power), an elderly couple who are in debt to an energy company. Later, Gemma discovers that her mother has a 35-year-old lover, Howard, who she has been seeing for two years. Mrs. Palmer has told him that she is younger than she actually is, and Gemma tells her he has to tell him the truth. She does so and then goes out to buy a bottle of champagne. Meanwhile, Josie tells Jeffrey she is pregnant. He stays with her, but says he is not the "marrying kind". Bernadette is upset that she has no boyfriend.
5	"Episode Five"	8 February 1981
After planning to spend a weekend with her mother and Julia, both cancel on Gemma meaning she has to spend the weekend on her own, having previously turned down a chance to go to Danny's cottage. However, when she accidentally locks herself out of her flat, she rings Danny from a neighbour's flat and he comes round with a spare key. When he arrives, he pretends to have forgotten the key, and drives her to the cottage. Meanwhile, Josie feels unweel and worries about the effect pregnancy will affect her body.
6	"Episode Six"	15 February 1981
After their weekend at the cottage, Gemma allows Danny to move back into her flat, which delights her mother. Gemma does however turn down his marriage proposal, saying they should live together for one year first. At work, Gemma goes to see Sharon Cartwright (Sue Nicholls), a woman in a high-rise flat, whose mother is living in the lift. After one week, Gemma asks Danny to leave as she feels it is not working. She also wants to be single again. Meanwhile, Josie wants to settle down and marry Geoffrey, and he finds them a bedsit to move in to.

=== Series Two (1982) ===
No.	Title	Original release date
7	"Episode One"	5 September 1982
Six months after telling Danny to leave, Gemma is out cycling one morning when a fellow cyclist 19-year-old Raif Williamson (Peter Howitt) asks her out on a date. She agrees to lunch with him, but half way through the meal they argue and she storms out. However, they soon make up when he goes running after her and they have lots of fun together. Meanwhile, at work she visits Mrs. Mitchell (Diana Bishop), a troubled mother of seven. After two weeks, Gemma ends the relationship after talking to her mother about the age difference between them.
8	"Episode Two"	12 September 1982
Gemma meets up with Julia, who tells her that she should have more fun. The following day, Gemma tells her mother that she is lonely in bed. Meanwhile, Gemma keeps getting mysterious phone calls from a man. During a power cut, she meets Sebastian Bale, who lives in the apartment above her, who says he made the calls. That night they sleep together, and when she wakes up in his bed the following morning she is very shocked.
9	"Episode Three"	19 September 1982
Following sleeping together, Gemma and Sebastian become friends and he continues to sleep with other women. Gemma goes to her doctor, Dr. Maynard (Ronnie Stevens), saying things are always on her mind and he diagnosis anxiety. She then decides to go away on her own for a holiday to a cottage in the countryside. At work, she makes three visits. The first is to an irate couple (Michael Ripper and Myrtle Devenish) who are complaining about their outside toilet; the second to Mrs. McNally (Deddie Davies), whose husband has walked out on her and thirdly to Mr Breck (Milton Johns) who has been in bed months because his wife (Margaret Pilleau) annoys him.
10	"Episode Four"	26 September 1982
After arriving back from her holiday, Gemma discovers that Sebastian has killed her goldfish by overfeeding him. Her mother then visits and tells her that Cissy Wareing, the sister of Mrs. Palmer’s mother, has died aged 82. The next day Gemma goes to say goodbye to her at the funeral home, and remembers the many times Cissy took her to Boxley Heath during her childhood. Shortly after the funeral, Gemma gets a letter from the solicitor Mr. Baines (Peter Penry-Jones) saying that Cissy requested she scattered her ashes on Boxley Heath and a reluctant Gemma does so. At the will reading, Mr. Baines says Gemma is left £3000, and after three other bequests, the rest of the estate is left to pay for a bench on Boxley Heath, to be dedicated to Cissy and Able Seaman Alfred Higgins, who was lost at sea in 1956.
11	"Episode Five"	3 October 1982
Since the will reading, Gemma has remembered how when Cissy took her to the Heath, she met up with Jack Higgins, who she loved but could never be with. With the £3000, Gemma decides to buy a car and Sebastian agrees to give her driving lessons, while also buying her a new goldfish. Gemma has a row with her mother over her future, and following that Mrs. Palmer cancels their planned lunch the following day to give Gemma space. At the same time, Sebastian cancels their normal breakfast meeting, as he grows ever closer to his latest woman, Rosie. Meanwhile, at work Mrs. Haywood (June Ellis) visits Gemma saying she has left her husband, just when Gemma had got the couple a new house.
12	"Episode Six"	10 October 1982
Rosie tells Gemma how she has a partner, Rex Collins. Soon after Rex comes round and punches Sebastian, who goes down to Gemma to have his injuries seen to. While in her flat, Rex comes round to apologise and talks to Gemma. The next day, Rex rings and, after saying he and Rosie have separated, he and Gemma go out for dinner. They soon go to bed. However, Rex punches Sebastian when he sees him come out of Gemma’s apartment in the morning, and says he does not want her to breakfast with Sebastian again. Gemma then suggests they end the relationship. Also, Gemma gets a cleaner, Iris Murdoch (Jo Manning Wilson), whom she soon dislikes.
13	"Episode Seven"	17 October 1982
After seeing her doctor, Mrs. Palmer realises she is going through the menopause, something she finds hard to deal with. She then decides to go away to a hotel for a few days. Howard then surprises her by joining her at the hotel. Rex and Gemma continue to go out with each other, although he is deeply unhappy with her continuing to breakfast with Sebastian. After an argument about this and her future domestic role if they married, he storms out. Meanwhile, Sebastian proposes to Rosie, who accepts. The next day, he tells Gemma that they can no longer breakfast together as Rosie has forbidden it.

=== Comic Relief Special (1989) ===
No.	Title	Original release date
-	"The Last Waltz"	10 March 1989

== DVD releases ==
The two series of Solo were released in a boxset in Region 2 (UK) on 17 March 2003.
