= Love Magic Fever =

Single by Idoling!!!
- Released: December 16, 2009
- Genre: Japanese pop
- Length: 17:56
- Label: Pony Canyon
- Songwriters: Sayaka Aoki, Funta7

Idoling!!! singles chronology
"Te no Hira no Yūki" (2009)	"Love Magic Fever" (2009)	"S.O.W. Sense of Wonder" (2010)

Love Magic Fever (ラブマジック♡フィーバー, Rabu Majikku Fībā) is the 10th single from the Japanese idol group Idoling!!! and was released under the sub-unit name "Puyo Puyo Idoling!!!" (ぷよぷよアイドリング!!!). It reached number 10 on the Oricon weekly chart and sold 8,444 copies in the first week.

== Contents ==
Love Magic Fever was released only in a normal edition (CD only).

== Track listing ==
=== CD ===
No.	Title	Lyrics	Music	Arrangement	Length
1.	"Love Magic Fever" (ラブマジック♡フィーバー)	Sayaka Aoki	Funta7	Funta7	4:00
2.	"Snow celebration -everlasting story-"	Takaki Mizoguchi	RYOJI	D・A・I	4:55
3.	"Love Magic Fever" (ラブマジック♡フィーバー; instrumental)		Funta7	Funta7	4:00
4.	"Snow celebration -everlasting story-" (instrumental)		RYOJI	D・A・I	4:55

== Notes ==
1. "Love Magic Fever" was used as a theme song for the SEGA game Puyo Puyo 7. This song was the only song performed under the original sub-unit "Puyo Puyo Idoling!!!". Later on, at Idoling!!! 10th live, Idoling!!! performed a song titled "Koi no 20 Rensa!!" under the name Puyo Puyo Idoling!!! consisting all of Idoling!!! members.
2. "Snow celebration -everlasting story-", on Liner Notes-ng!!! (album SUNRISE bonus DVD) it was explained that the lyric is a three-years-later story of the original "Snow celebration" song.
3. Sub-unit "Puyo Puyo Idoling!!!" members are #7 Erika Yazawa, #8 Phongchi, #12 Yui Kawamura, #13 Serina Nagano, #14 Hitomi Sakai, #15 Nao Asahi, #16 Ami Kikuchi, and #21 Kaede Hashimoto.
4. On the Idoling!!! TV show "Idoling!!! Nikki", it was shown that #17 Hitomi Miyake and #21 Kaede Hashimoto asked Sayaka Aoki to write the song "Love Magic Fever". Sayaka Aoki is a female comedian attached to Watanabe Entertainment, the same agency as Miyake and Hashimoto.
