= Petit-Petit =

Studio album by Idoling!!!
- Released: August 19, 2009
- Genre: Japanese pop
- Length: 67:33
- Label: Pony Canyon

Idoling!!! chronology
Daiji na Mono (2008)	Petit-Petit (2009)	Sunrise (2010)

Petit-Petit is the second full-length studio album by the Japanese idol group Idoling!!!. It reached number 17 on Oricon weekly chart.

== Contents ==
Petit-Petit was released in three types:

- Premium edition (CD, DVD, and photobook)
- Standard edition (CD and DVD)
- Low Price edition (CD only)

== Track listing ==
=== CD ===
No.	Title	Lyrics	Music	Arrangement	Length
1.	"Petit-Petit"		Noiz Republic		1:39
2.	"Mujouken Koufuku" (無条件☆幸福; Mujōken Kōfuku)	Sumiyo Mutsumi	Makoto Miyazaki	Makoto Miyazaki	4:36
3.	"Shokugyou: Idol. Are?MIX" (「職業:アイドル。」アレ?MIX; Shokugyō:Idol. Are?MIX)	Tonji,7chiko♪	Funta7	Funta7	4:33
4.	"Lemon Drop" (レモンドロップ)	Takaki Mizoguchi	K-LaB	Kazuyuki Satou(K-LaB)	4:18
5.	"Forever Remember"	Shino	hiroki	Cell no.9	4:35
6.	"Beta na Shitsuren ~Shibuya ni Furu Yuki~" (ベタな失恋〜渋谷に降る雪〜)	Tonji	Hajime Mizoshita	Hajime Mizoshita	4:53
7.	"Royal Milk Girl" (ロイヤルミルクガール)	Bakarhythm	Katsumi Onishi	Katsumi Onishi	3:42
8.	"NAGARA" (NA・GA・RA)	Kyousaku Nara	Miki Fujisue	Miki Fujisue	3:50
9.	"Harukanaru Virgin Road" (遥かなるバージンロード; Harukanaru Bājin Rōdo)	Motohiro Itsuki, Yasuyuki Kojou	emagic	Yasuyuki Kojou	5:39
10.	"Kajuu 30% Orange Juice Tsubu Tsubu Iri" (果汁30%オレンジジュースつぶつぶ入り; Kajū 30% Orenji Jūsu Tsubu Tsubu Iri)	Daisuke Idzutsu	Satoru "ucchy" Uchida	Satoru "ucchy" Uchida	2:25
11.	"Kokuhaku" (告白)	Kaela Kimura	Ikoman	Saki	4:03
12.	"Hannin wa Anata desu" (犯人はあなたです♡)	Kensaku Sakai	Satoru "ucchy" Uchida	Satoru "ucchy" Uchida	3:53
13.	"baby blue"	Amena (Natsuyo Akabane)	Satoru "ucchy" Uchida	Takeshi Toriumi	4:21
14.	"Soushoku-kei Carnival Nikushoku-kei ver." (草食系カーニバル 肉食系ver.; Sōshoku-kei Kānibaru Nikushoku-kei ver.)	Yusuke Toriumi	Tooru Watanabe, Hirofumi Hibino	YOO	3:11
15.	"Like a Shooting Star puru-lele ver."	Kouhei Doujima	Atsushi Hirasawa	Kouhei Doujima	4:20
16.	"Tokimeki Dreaming!!! Dreaming!!!MIX" (トキメキDREAMィング!!! DREAMィング!!!MIX)	Takaki Mizoguchi	K-LaB	hare-brained unity	4:34
17.	"Sayonara Mata ne Daisuki" (さよなら・またね・だいすき)	Amena	Satoru "ucchy" Uchida	Satoru "ucchy" Uchida	4:59

=== DVD ===
==== Premium edition ====
1. Third generation members audition video
2. Maboroshi no HOT FANTAY ODAIBA 2008–2009 Live (2009.1.4) footage
3. Dance video (Mujouken Koufuku A-type)
4. Dance video (Kajuu 30% Orange Juice Tsubu Tsubu Iri)

==== Standard edition ====
1. Third generation members audition video
2. Maboroshi no HOT FANTAY ODAIBA 2008–2009 Live (2009.1.1) footage
3. Dance video (Mujouken Koufuku B-type)

== Notes ==
- Mujouken Koufuku was used as the ending song of Fuji TV's "Raion no Gokigenyō" from June 29 – September 25, 2009.
- Lemon Drop was used as the ending song of "Pyokotan Profile" movie.
- Forever Remember was performed by #3 Mai Endō, #6 Erica Tonooka, #9 Rurika Yokoyama, #11 Suzuka Morita, #15 Nao Asahi, #17 Hitomi Miyake, #20 Ai Ōkawa.
- Beta na Shitsuren ~Shibuya ni Furu Yuki~ was a sub-unit song performed by Kyun Kyun Idoling!!!.
- Royal Milk Girl was performed by #7 Erika Yazawa, #8 Fonchi, #12 Yui Kawamura, #13 Serina Nagano, #14 Hitomi Sakai, #16 Ami Kikuchi, #19 Yurika Tachibana, #21 Kaede Hashimoto, and Bakarhythm (Comedian and Idoling!!! TV show MC).
- NAGARA was a sub-unit song performed by Giza Giza Idoling!!!.
- Harukanaru Virgin Road was a sub-unit song performed by Ban Ban Idoling!!!.
- Kokuhaku was used as campaign song of Microsoft Windows Vista campaign "Vista Gakuen".
- Hannin wa Anata desu was a sub-unit song performed by Furi Furi Idoling!!!.
- baby blue was used as the ending song of Fuji TV's "Kiseki Taiken! Unbelievable" from April – July, 2009.
- Like a Shooting Star puru-lele ver. was performed by #3 Mai Endō.
- Tokimeki Dreaming!!! Dreaming!!!MIX was used as ROBO_JAPAN 2008 image song.
