= Summer Lion =

Single by Idoling!!!
- Released: August 7, 2013
- Genre: Japanese pop
- Length: 17:10 (standard); 17:47 (Type A); 16:00 (Type B); 12:38 (Type C)
- Label: Pony Canyon
- Songwriter(s): SAKRA

Idoling!!! singles chronology
"Sakura Thank You" (2013)	"Summer Lion" (2013)	"Shout!!!" (2013)

Summer Lion (サマーライオン, Samā Raion) is the 20th single from the Japanese idol group Idoling!!!. It reached number five on M-ON! Countdown 100 and number six on the Oricon Weekly Chart.

== Contents ==
Summer Lion was released in four types:

- Standard edition (CD)
- Limited A-type edition (CD and DVD)
- Limited B-type edition (CD and Blu-ray)
- Limited C-type edition (CD)

On the covers of the Limited A, B, and C editions, each cover features the same five main vocal members in the front with five different supporting members behind the main vocalists. The main vocalists are #6 Erica Tonooka, #9 Rurika Yokoyama, #22 Ruka Kurata, #25 Kaoru Goto, #26 Chika Ojima.

The Limited A cover features main vocalist #25 Kaoru Goto in the center with supporting vocals by #28 Karen Ishida, #21 Kaede Hashimoto, #3 Mai Endo, #20 Ai Okawa, #14 Hitomi Sakai.

The Limited B cover features main vocalist #26 Chika Ojima in the center with supporting vocals by #17 Hitomi Miyake, #30 Reia Kiyoku, #23 Yuna Ito, #27 Kurumi Takahashi, #13 Serina Nagano.

The Limited C cover features main vocalist #22 Ruka Kurata in the center with supporting vocals by #12 Yui Kawamura, #16 Ami Kikuchi, #15 Nao Asahi, #29 Ramu Tamagawa, #19 Yurika Tachibana.

== Track listing ==
No.	Title	Lyrics	Music	Arrangement	Length
1.	"Summer Lion" (サマーライオン)	SAKRA	SAKRA	SAKRA	3:48
2.	"Natsuiro Kiss" (夏色キッス☆)	Tada Shin'ya	Tada Shin'ya	MEG.ME	4:47
3.	"Summer Lion" (instrumental)		SAKRA	SAKRA	3:48
4.	"Natsuiro Kiss" (instrumental)		Tada Shin'ya	MEG.ME	4:47

Limited A-type edition
No.	Title	Lyrics	Music	Arrangement	Length
3.	"Ohisama Darling" (おひさまダーリン)	Matsui Ryota, waio	Matsui Ryota	waio	4:25
4.	"Natsuiro Kiss" (Producer's Edit)	Tada Shin'ya	Tada Shin'ya	MEG.ME	4:46

Limited B-type edition
No.	Title	Lyrics	Music	Arrangement	Length
3.	"3nen-me no Uwaki" (3年目の浮気)	Sasaki Ben	Sasaki Ben	SHIKI	3:38
4.	"Summer Lion" (Producer's Edit)	SAKRA	SAKRA	SAKRA	3:46

Limited C-type edition
No.	Title	Lyrics	Music	Arrangement	Length
3.	"Milky Girl" (ミルキーガール) (with Hana Taguchi from Sakura Gakuin)	Miyazaki Makoto	Miyazaki Makoto	Miyazaki Makoto	4:03

Limited A-type edition DVD

1. Summer Lion -Music Video-
2. Summer Lion -Dancing Ver.-
3. Summer Lion MV Making-of

Limited B-type edition Blu-ray

1. Summer Lion -Music Video-
2. Summer Lion -Dancing Ver.-
3. Summer Lion MV Making-of
4. Omake: Kawamura Umeko (3nen Me no Uwaki)

== Notes ==
1. The main vocalists for "Summer Lion" were chosen from the main vocal audition that was broadcast during Idoling!!!’s TV show, episode 991 (Fuji TV CS, April 30, 2013). On the weekly episode (Fuji TV, May 23, 2013), it was announced that the winners were (ordered by number) #6 Erica Tonooka, #9 Rurika Yokoyama, #22 Ruka Kurata, #25 Kaoru Goto, #26 Chika Ojima.
2. The "Summer Lion" music video was filmed at Idoling!!!'s TV show studio at Fuji TV. This is the first Idoling!!! PV to feature the TV show's MC, Bakarhythm, and it is also the first time an Idoling!!! PV was directed by the TV show's director, Shimada. The concept of the PV came from Idoling!!!'s newly appointed producer, Takashi Kanbara, who was the producer of the Fuji TV show Quiz! Hexagon.
3. "Milky Girl" features Hana Taguchi as an exchange student from Sakura Gakuin.
4. "3-nen me no uwaki" is #12 Yui Kawamura's solo song with the male parts presented in a karaoke style to sing along to. It is a cover song that was originally performed by the duet Hiroshi (Hiroshi Kurosawa) & Kibo (Kiyoko Yamada) in 1982.
