= Sakura Thank You =

Single by Idoling!!!
- Released: February 13, 2013
- Genre: Japanese pop
- Length: 19:21 (Limited Edition Type A); 19:32 (Limited Edition Type B); 14:46 (Normal Edition)
- Label: Pony Canyon
- Songwriters: Shin'ya Tada, Keigo Yo

Idoling!!! singles chronology
"One Up!!!/Ichigo Gyūnyū" (2012)	"Sakura Thank You" (2013)	"Summer Lion" (2013)

Sakura Thank You (さくらサンキュー, Sakura Sankyū) is the 19th single from the Japanese idol group Idoling!!!. It reached number 2 on the Tower Record weekly chart, number 2 on M-ON! Countdown 100, number 4 on Music Station Power Ranking, and number 3 on Oricon Weekly Chart.

== Contents ==
Sakura Thank You was released in three types:

- Limited A-type Edition (CD and DVD)
- Limited B-type Edition (CD and Blu-ray)
- Normal Edition (CD)

The Limited A-type and B-type editions each features 10 members on the cover.

Limited A features #3 Mai Endo, #6 Erica Tonooka, #9 Rurika Yokoyama, #13 Serina Nagano, #14 Hitomi Sakai, #16 Ami Kikuchi, #17 Hitomi Miyake, #27 Kurumi Takahashi, #28 Karen Ishida, and #30 Reia Kiyoku.

Limited B features #12 Yui Kawamura, #15 Nao Asahi, #19 Yurika Tachibana, #20 Ai Okawa, #21 Kaede Hashimoto, #22 Ruka Kurata, #23 Yuna Ito, #25 Kaoru Goto, #26 Chika Ojima, and #29 Ramu Tamagawa.

== Track listing ==
=== Limited A-type edition ===
==== CD ====
No.	Title	Lyrics	Music	Arrangement	Length
1.	"Sakura Thank You" (さくらサンキュー)	Shin'ya Tada	Keigo Yo	Shin'ya Tada	3:59
2.	"Secret Xmas"	M.B.L	Tooru Watanabe	Hirofumi Hibino	3:26
3.	"Sakura Thank You (Instrumental)" (さくらサンキュー (Instrumental))		Keigo Yo	Shin'ya Tada	3:58
4.	"Secret Xmas (Instrumental)"		Tooru Watanabe	Hirofumi Hibino	3:23
5.	"Moshiwakenaito Presents IDOLING !!! MEGAMIX !!! -Digest-" (申し訳ないとPresents IDOLING !!! MEGAMIX !!! -Digest-)				4:35

==== DVD ====
1. Sakura Thank You -Music Video-
2. Sakura Thank You -Dancing Ver.-
3. Sakura Thank You MV Making-of

=== Limited B-type edition ===
==== CD ====
No.	Title	Lyrics	Music	Arrangement	Length
1.	"Sakura Thank You" (さくらサンキュー)	Shin'ya Tada	Keigo Yo	Shin'ya Tada	3:59
2.	"voice"	leonn	Hirofumi Hibino	Hirofumi Hibino	3:30
3.	"Sakura Thank You (Instrumental)" (さくらサンキュー (Instrumental))		Keigo Yo	Shin'ya Tada	3:58
4.	"voice (Instrumental)"		Hirofumi Hibino	Hirofumi Hibino	3:30
5.	"Moshiwakenaito Presents IDOLING !!! MEGAMIX !!! -Digest-" (申し訳ないとPresents IDOLING !!! MEGAMIX !!! -Digest-)				4:35

==== Blu-ray ====
1. Sakura Thank You -Music Video-
2. Sakura Thank You -Dancing Ver.-
3. Sakura Thank You MV Making-of
4. voice -Music Video-
5. voice MV Making-of
6. Omake

=== Normal edition ===
==== CD ====
No.	Title	Lyrics	Music	Arrangement	Length
1.	"Sakura Thank You" (さくらサンキュー)	Shin'ya Tada	Keigo Yo	Shin'ya Tada	3:59
2.	"Secret Xmas"	M.B.L	Tooru Watanabe	Hirofumi Hibino	3:26
3.	"Sakura Thank You (Instrumental)" (さくらサンキュー (Instrumental))		Keigo Yo	Shin'ya Tada	3:58
4.	"Secret Xmas (Instrumental)"		Tooru Watanabe	Hirofumi Hibino	3:23

== Notes ==
1. #24 Manami Nomoto, graduated at the end of 2012, was participated in the filming of Sakura Thank You music video.
2. Sakura Thank You and Secret Xmas were performed for the first time in Idoling!!! 12th Live at NHK Hall. Sakura Thank You was freely available on YouTube as part of the promotion by using the fans' smartphone video camera to record the performance and upload it to various video hosting websites.
3. Sakura Thank You music video was filmed at Tatsunoko Field in Ibaraki Prefecture.
4. Secret Xmas was performed by Secret girls' members; #15 Nao Asahi, #21 Kaede Hashimoto, #23 Yuna Ito.
5. voice was performed by 1st generation members; #3 Mai Endo, #6 Erica Tonooka, #9 Rurika Yokoyama.
