= Gold Experience (Idoling!!! album) =

- Spotify cover. Alternative editions feature different colors.

Studio album by Idoling!!!
- Released: January 8, 2014
- Genre: Japanese pop
- Length: 1:12:50
- Label: Pony Canyon

Idoling!!! chronology
Sisters (2011)	Gold Experience (2014)

Gold Experience (stylized in all caps) is the fifth full-length studio album from the Japanese idol group Idoling!!!. It reached number 3 on the Oricon Weekly Chart.

== Contents ==
Gold Experience was released in three types:

- Limited A-type Edition (CD and DVD)
- Limited B-type Edition (CD and Blu-ray)
- Normal Edition (CD)

The Limited A cover features #3 Mai Endo, #12 Yui Kawamura, #14 Sakai Hitomi, #15 Nao Asahi, #17 Hitomi Miyake, #20 Ai Okawa, #23 Yuna Ito, #26 Chika Ojima, #27 Kurumi Takahashi, #30 Reia Kiyoku, #31 Mayu Furuhashi, #32 Mayu Sekiya, #33 Ruka Hashimoto.

The Limited B cover features #6 Erica Tonooka, #9 Rurika Yokoyama, #13 Serina Nagano, #16 Ami Kikuchi, #19 Yurika Tachibana, #21 Kaede Hashimoto, #22 Ruka Kurata, #25 Kaoru Goto, #28 Karen Ishida, #29 Ramu Tamagawa, #34 Rena Sato, #35 Michaela Wako Sato.

== Track listing ==
=== All edition ===
==== CD ====
No.	Title	Lyrics	Music	Arrangement	Length
1.	"Shokugyō: Idol (25idoling Ver.)" (「職業:アイドル。」 (25idoling Ver.))	Tonji, 7chiko♪	Funta7	Funta7	4:26
2.	"MAMORE!!! (25idoling Ver.)"	leonn	Hirofumi Hibino	Hirofumi Hibino	4:16
3.	"Ichigo Gyūnyū (25idoling Ver.)" (苺牛乳 (25idoling Ver.))	Makoto Miyazaki	Makoto Miyazaki	Makoto Miyazaki	4:31
4.	"Akogare Adoration" (あこがれアドレイション)	Aiko Okumura	Kazuaki Yamashita	Kazuaki Yamashita	4:05
5.	"Kaniko" (カニ子)	Kensaku Sakai	Yuka Uchiyae	SAKRA	3:35
6.	"Sentō Renai Shōjo Robo B Gata no Yūutsu" (戦闘恋愛少女ロボB型の憂鬱)	Kensaku Sakai	Makoto Miyazaki	Makoto Miyazaki	4:33
7.	"Bon Voyage!"	leonn	Hirofumi Hibino	Hirofumi Hibino	3:53
8.	"Sakura Thank You (25idoling Ver.)" (さくらサンキュー (25idoling Ver.))	Shin'ya Tada	Shin'ya Tada	Keigo Yo	3:58
9.	"Natsu no Ojōsan" (夏のお嬢さん)	Kazama Jun	Sasaki Ben	Miyazaki Makoto	2:53
10.	"Namida no Freesia" (涙のフリージア)	Riko Ohashi	Riko Ohashi	Riko Ohashi	4:11
11.	"Samui Yoru Dakara..." (寒い夜だから…)	Tetsuya Komuro	Tetsuya Komuro	Tooru Watanabe	5:18
12.	"Puri♥Kyun Survival" (プリ♥きゅんサバイバル)	Hiromasa Ijichi	Hiromasa Ijichi	Makoto Sakuma	4:08
13.	"One Up!!! (25idoling Ver.)"	leonn	Tooru Watanabase	Hirofumi Hibino	4:06
14.	"Promise"	Ruka Kawada	Ruka Kawada	Ruka Kawada	5:17
15.	"Don't think. Feel !!! (25idoling Ver.)"	PA-NON	Shihori	KOUTAPAI	3:47
16.	"I no Standard 2014" (Iのスタンダード2014)	leonn	Hirofumi Hibino	Hirofumi Hibino	5:46
17.	"Shine On"	TSUKASA	TSUKASA	TSUKASA	3:48
Total length:					1:12:50

==== Blu-ray & DVD ====
1. Don't think. Feel !!! -Music Video-
2. MAMORE!!! -Music Video-
3. One Up!!! -Music Video-
4. Ichigo Gyūnyū -Music Video-
5. Sakura Thank You -Music Video-

== Notes ==
1. The first album featuring 5th and Neo(6th) Generation members.
2. Kaniko is performed by KANI SEVEN (#12 Kawamura, #13 Nagano, #17 Miyake, #22 Kurata, #26 Ojima, #30 Kiyoku, #32 Sekiya).
3. Sentō Renai Shōjo Robo B-gata no Yūutsu is performed by B-gataΩIdoling!!! (#13 Nagano, #15 Asahi, #16 Kikuchi, #25 Goto, #26 Ojima).
4. Bon Voyage! is performed by U-17ing!!! (#21 K.Hashimoto, #22 Kurata, #27 Takahashi, #28 Ishida, #29 Tamagawa, #30 Kiyoku, #31 Furuhashi, #33 R.Hashimoto, #34 R.Sato, #35 M.Sato).
5. Natsu no Ojousan is performed by PEACE!Idoling!!! (#3 Endo, #6 Tonooka, #9 Yokoyama, #12 Kawamura, #13 Nagano, #14 Sakai, #15 Asahi, #16 Kikuchi, #17 Miyake, #19 Tachibana, #20 Okawa, #26 Ojima). The song is a cover song originally performed by Sakakibara Ikue.
6. Namida no Freesia is performed by Nakimushi!?Idoling!!! (#15 Asahi, #16 Kikuchi, #20 Okawa, #29 Tamagawa).
7. Samui Yoru Dakara... is a cover song originally performed by TRF. The song was used as Fuji TV Winter Fest 2014 image song.
8. Puri♥Kyun Survival is performed by Idoling NEO (#23 Ito, #25 Goto, #31 Furuhashi, #32 Sekiya, #33 R.Hashimoto, #34 R.Sato, #35 M.Sato).
9. Promise is performed by Shittori♮Idoling!!! (#3 Endo, #6 Tonooka, #9 Yokoyama, #17 Miyake, #19 Tachibana, #23 Ito, #31 Furuhashi, #32 Sekiya).
