= Sunrise (Idoling!!! album) =

Studio album by Idoling!!!
- Released: March 3, 2010
- Genre: Japanese pop
- Length: 56:54
- Label: Pony Canyon

Idoling!!! chronology
Petit-Petit (2009)	Sunrise (2010)	Sisters (2011)

Sunrise (stylized as SUNRISE) is the third full-length studio album by Japanese idol group Idoling!!!. It reached number 14 on the Oricon chart. It was released in three different versions: Premium, Standard, and Low-price. The premium package cover design was drawn by Hiro Mashima, the author of manga Fairy Tail.

The song "Sunrise" was used as the Fuji TV Kiseki Taiken! Unbelievable ending theme song for April to June 2010. "Tenohira no Yūki" was used as the Tokimeki Memorial 4 opening theme song under the name Tokimeki Idoling!!!. "Love Magic Fever" was used as image song for the Puyo Puyo 7 under the name Puyo Puyo Idoling!!!. "S.O.W Sense of Wonder" was used as opening theme song for the TV Tokyo anime Fairy Tail.

== Contents ==
Sunrise was released in three versions:

- Premium Edition (CD, DVD, and photobook)
- Standard Edition (CD and DVD)
- Low-price Edition (CD only)

== Track listing ==
=== CD ===
No.	Title	Lyrics	Music	Arrangement	Length
1.	"Prologue: Reminiscent of Moonlight"	T.Mori	Atsushi Yoshida	T.Mori
2.	"Sunrise"	Fumihito Morita	Mashimo Masaki	Mashimo Masaki
3.	"Kishuhen Ecstasy" (機種変エクスタシィ)	Kensaku Sakai	Hirofumi Hibino	Hirofumi Hibino
4.	"Tenohira no Yūki" (手のひらの勇気)	Ai Kawashima	Ai Kawashima	K-LaB
5.	"U"	7chiko	Kazuyuki Satō	K-LaB
6.	"Sunadokei" (砂時計)	Kana	Daisuke Noriyuki	Ron
7.	"Snow Celebration: Everlasting Story"	Takaki Mizuguchi	Dai	Ryojo
8.	"San Dome no Kinenbi" (3度目の記念日)	Leonn	Bounceback	ats-
9.	"La La La La no Song" (等・等・等 等のSONG)	Hidetomo Masuno	Katsumi Onishi	Katsumi Onishi
10.	"Love Magic Fever ~Love Love Magic Hyper Mix~" (ラブマジック♡フィーバー 〜ラブラブマジックハイパーミックス〜)	Sayaka Aoki	Funta7	Funta7
11.	"Hōkago Telepathy: Inokori Hoshū Mix" (放課後テレパシィ 〜居残り補習Mix〜)	Shino	Cell no.9	Hiroki
12.	"Rainy Girl" (レイニィガール)	Leonn	Katsumi Onishi	Katsumi Onishi
13.	"Don't be Afraid: Director's cut"	Leonn	Bounceback	Tooru Watanabe
14.	"S.O.W Sense of Wonder" (S.O.W. センスオブワンダー)	Leonn	Hirofumi Hibino	Hirofumi Hibino

=== DVD ===
1. Music clip of
  1. Tenohira no Yūki
  2. Love Magic Fever
  3. S.O.W Sense of Wonder
  4. U
  5. Hōkago Telepathy
2. Idoling!!! ga Kataru Liner Notes-ing
3. Making of music clip of Tenohira no Yūki and Love Magic Fever, and photo session of Sunrise
4. Odaiba Gasshūkoku 2009 Gasshūkoku Happy Stadium LIVE (2009.8.15) (Premium edition only)
5. Odaiba Gasshūkoku 2009 Gasshūkoku Happy Stadium LIVE (2009.7.21) (Standard edition only)

== Notes ==
1. The song "Tenohira no Yūki" was sung by sub-unit Tokimeki Idoling!!! (Mai Endō, Erica Tonooka, Rurika Yokoyama, Suzuka Morita, Hitomi Miyake, and Ai Ōkawa).
2. The song "U" wassung by Mai Endō, Erika Yazawa, Phongchi, Yui Kawamura, Hitomi Sakai, and Ami Kikuchi.
3. The song "Sunadokei" was sung by Erica Tonooka, Phongchi, Serina Nagano, Hitomi Sakai, Hitomi Miyake, Yurika Tachibana, and Ai Ōkawa.
4. The song "San Dome no Kinenbi" was sung by Mai Endō, Erica Tonooka, Phongchi, Rurika Yokoyama, Yui Kawamura, and Nao Asahi.
5. The song "Love Magic Fever" was sung by sub-unit Puyo Puyo Idoling!!! (Erika Yazawa, Phongchi, Yui Kawamura, Serina Nagano, Hitomi Sakai, Nao Asahi, Ami Kikuchi, and Kaede Hashimoto).
6. The song "Hōkago Telepathy" was sung by Erica Tonooka, Rurika Yokoyama, Suzuka Morita, Serina Nagano, Nao Asahi, Hitomi Miyake, Yurika Tachibana, Ai Ōkawa, and Kaede Hashimoto.
