= Yarakai Heart =

Single by Idoling!!!
- Released: March 2, 2011
- Genre: Japanese pop
- Length: 16:52 (First Press Limited Edition); 20:28 (Normal Edition)
- Label: Pony Canyon
- Songwriters: Lyrics : leonn music:Hibino Hirofumi

Idoling!!! singles chronology
| "eve" (2010) | "Yarakai Heart" (2011) | "Don't think. Feel !!!" (2011) |

Alternative cover

Alternative cover

Yarakai Heart (やらかいはぁと, Yarakai Hāto; Soft Heart) is the 15th single from Japanese idol group Idoling!!!. It reached number 4 on Oricon chart. "Yarakai Heart" used as LittleBigPlanet 2 Japanese release CM song. The coupling song "Queen Bee ~Shōjo no Jidai Kara~" used as Fuji TV Kiseki Taiken! Unbelievable ending theme song for January - March 2011 and "Konayuki ga Mau Machinami de" used as CBC Otakara Hasshin Tower DAI-NAMO ending theme song.

== Contents ==
Yarakai Heart released in three types:

- Limited A-type (CD and DVD)
- Limited B-type (CD and original QT Card)
- Normal Type (CD only)

== Track listing ==
=== CD ===
| No. | Title | Lyrics | Music | Arrangement | Length |
|---|---|---|---|---|---|
| 1. | "Yarakai Heart" (やらかいはぁと, Yarakai Hāto) | leonn | Hibino Hirofumi | Tooru Watanabe | 4:06 |
| 2. | "Queen Bee~Shōjo no Jidai Kara~" (Queen Bee〜少女の時代から〜) | leonn | HAN JAE HO, KIM SEUNG SOO | HAN JAE HO, KIM SEUNG SOO | 3:24 |
| 3. | "Konayuki ga Mau Machinami de" (粉雪が舞う街並みで) | leonn | Hibino Hirofumi | ats- | 5:16 |
| 4. | "Ichi-koi" (いち恋) | leonn | Hibino Hirofumi | Hibino Hirofumi | 3:37 |
| 5. | "Yarakai Heart (Instrumental)" | | Hibino Hirofumi | Tooru Watanabe | 4:06 |

=== DVD ===
1. Yarakai Heart music video
2. Making of Yarakai Heart music video and CD jacket photoshoot

== Notes ==
1. "Queen Bee~Shōjo no Jidai Kara~" sung by six members with body height over 160 cm. They are #3 Mai Endō, #9 Rurika Yokoyama, #15 Nao Asahi, #16 Ami Kikuchi, #19 Yurika Tachibana, and #20 Ai Ōkawa. The song is supervised by Han Jae Ho and Kim Seung Soo (Sweetune), known for their works with Korean pop group "KARA". Some parts of the lyric are written in Korean.
2. "Ichi-koi" only available on normal edition. It sung by Nao Asahi and Kaoru Gotō (Team学ラン, Team Gakuran) as the winner of Idoling!!! & Yahoo! Japan special collaboration event voted by fans.
