= Daiji na Mono =

Studio album by Idoling!!!
- Released: February 27, 2008
- Genre: Japanese pop
- Length: 1:01:40
- Label: Pony Canyon

Idoling!!! chronology
Daiji na Mono (2008)	Petit-Petit (2009)

Daiji na Mono (だいじなもの, A Precious Thing) is the first full-length studio album by the Japanese idol group Idoling!!!. This album was recorded with the original nine members, as the Second Generation (Nikisei) was introduced two months later. It was released on February 27, 2008. It reached the 16th place on the Oricon Weekly Albums Chart.

== Track listing ==
1. The Theme of "Idoling"
2. 百花繚乱 アイドリング!!! (Hyakkaryouran Idoling!!!)
3. Friend
4. モテ期のうた (Album Mix) (Moteki no Uta (Album Mix))
5. キミがスキ (Vox.change) (Kimi ga Suki (Vox.change))
6. Snow Celebration
7. ガンバレ乙女(笑) Ultimate Party Mix (Ganbare Otome (Laugh) Ultimate Party Mix) ^{1}
8. 台場の恋の物語 (Daiba no Koi no Monogatari)
9. 恋ゴコロ (Koi Gokoro)
10. Stay with Me
11. Like a Shooting Star
12. 想いの詩 (Omoi no Uta)
13. ガンバレ乙女(笑) (Ganbare Otome (Laugh)) ^{1}
14. だいじなもの (Daiji na Mono)

^{1} The (Laugh) character in brackets is known as "kakko-warai" which is the Japanese equivalent of "Haha" or "LOL".

== Tracks ==
=== The Theme of "Idoling" ===
A hip-hop piece performed in English by male vocalists. The track serves as a quick introduction to all nine members of the band by designating an entire verse to each.

=== Kimi ga Suki (Vox.change) ===
(I Like You)
The original track was featured on the first single, Ganbare Otome. This version swaps members for different parts. For example, the single version's intro was performed (in order) by Phongchi (#8), Koizumi (#2), Eto (#4), and Kato (#1) while the album version's intro was performed by Endo (#3), Takiguchi (#5), Phongchi (#8) and Kato (#1).

=== Daiba no Koi no Monogatari ===
(A Love Story in Daiba)
To add variety and to showcase the individual girls' vocal styles, three tracks debuted on Daiji na Mono to satisfy that purpose. The first, Daiba no Koi no Monogatari, is performed (in order) by Kato (#1), Yazawa (#7), Phongchi (#8) and Takiguchi (#5) with all male parts performed by Baka-Rizumu Masuno (Hidetomo Masuno, Host of Idoling's TV activities).

The song is done in a classic Japanese enka style. The lyrics feature fictitious comedic dialogue between Masuno and the girls as they attempt to woo him, only to have him turn each one down with a specific reason that pertains to their TV personality. (Kato is turned down for not being young enough, Yazawa for not being thin enough, Phongchi for not speaking enough and Takiguchi for being a general failure.)

=== Stay with Me ===
The second split-group song, performed by Tonooka (#6) and Yokoyama (#9).

=== Omoi no Uta ===
(A Song of My Thoughts)
The third and final split-group piece is a ballad performed (in order of verse) by Eto (#4), Endo (#3) and Koizumi (#2).

=== Daiji na Mono ===
(A Precious Thing)
The title track of the album commits entire tercets to each member, with each member having written their own lyrics for their respective tercets. Each verse features three members, with the same three members singing the chorus that follows (the exception being the final chorus which is performed by the entire group with back-up singers.)

Verse 1
Eto (#4) "If your tears pour out, smile into a mirror. You may just become a new person."
Yazawa (#7) "Even with the smallest of things, I'll try my best. The World I've hidden away inside will spread out."
Takiguchi (#5) "I'm becoming an adult quicker than I thought. I'll engrave the present into my heart and walk on."

Verse 2
Koizumi (#2) "I've arrived at a large audience, so I've perfected my make-up. Please, witness me as I shine."
Phongchi (#8) "Take your rainbow coloured dreams and paint them on a white page. It'll turn into a ticket to tomorrow."
Tonooka (#6) "When you feel like you're breaking down, believe in yourself. Tomorrow's shining, let's go."

Verse 3
Kato (#1) "Welcome home to the place where love is found. I can say this meekly now, 'Thank You'"
Yokoyama (#9) "You told me to give it my best effort. Because you're watching over me, I can."
Endo (#3) "My hand's against my heart, I feel a familiar rhythm. See? It means today, once again, I'm alive."

== Charts ==
Chart (2008)	Weekly Rank
Japanese Oricon Album Charts	16
