= Sisters (Idoling!!! album) =

Studio album by Idoling!!!
- Released: March 16, 2011
- Genre: Japanese pop
- Length: 1:10:37
- Label: Pony Canyon

Idoling!!! chronology
Sunrise (2010)	Sisters (2011)	Gold Experience (2014)

Alternative cover
- Limited A-type front cover

Alternative cover
- Limited B-type front cover

Sisters (stylized as SISTERS) is the fourth full-length studio album by Japanese idol group Idoling!!!. It reached number 17 on Oricon chart. The song "Makehende" used as Fuji TV "Wakeari Nē-san EX" ending song.

== Contents ==
Sisters released in three types:

- Limited A-type (CD and DVD)
- Limited B-type (CD and Photobook)
- Normal Type (CD only)

== Track listing ==
=== CD ===
No.	Title	Lyrics	Music	Arrangement	Length
1.	"Rollin'"		Watanabe	Tooru Watanabe	1:00
2.	"Sister"	Kensaku Sakai, Terry Itō	Bounceback	Watanabe	4:06
3.	"Yarakai Heart -Extended Edition-" (やらかいはぁと -Extended Edition-; Yarakai Hāto -Extended Edition-)	leonn	Hirofumi Hibino	Watanabe	4:31
4.	"Haruiro no Sora" (春色の空)	Hanako Oku	Oku	ha-j	4:40
5.	"Me ni wa Aoba Yama Hototogisu Hatsukoi" (目には青葉 山ホトトギス 初恋)	Aiko Okumura	Okumura	Makoto Miyazaki	3:32
6.	"Poolside Daisakusen" (プールサイド大作戦;Pūrusaido Daisakusen)	leonn	Hibino	Hibino	3:27
7.	"A.NA.LO.G" (ア・ナ・ロ・グ;A・Na・Ro・Gu)	Yukako by Simonsayz	kohei by Simonsayz	kohei by Simonsayz	3:13
8.	"Bokura no Niwa -eco mix-" (ボクらの庭 -eco mix-)	Okumura	Okumura	K-LaB	4:19
9.	"eve -Voices Mix-"	leonn	Hibino	Hibino	5:39
10.	"Konayuki ga Mau Machinami de -Powder Snow Mix-" (粉雪が舞う街並みで -Powder Snow Mix-)	leonn	Hibino	ats-	5:17
11.	"4U"	leonn	Hibino	Hibino	3:30
12.	"Queen Bee~Shōjo no Jidai Kara~" (Queen Bee〜少女の時代から〜)	leonn	Han, Kim	Han Jae Ho, Kim Seung Soo	3:25
13.	"Caramel Latte Nomi Iko-! -Jitsu wa Tōbun Kajōsesshu Mix-" (キャラメルラテ飲み行こー! -実は糖分過剰摂取Mix-; Kyarameru Rate Nomi Iko-! -Jitsu wa Tōbun Kajōsesshu Mix-)	Kyasu Morizuki	Katsumi Ohnishi	Watanabe, Hibino	3:33
14.	"Ichi Koi" (いち恋)	leonn	Hibino	Hibino	3:37
15.	"Makehende" (まけへんで)	Ayu Sumaru	Kawada	Ruka Kawada	5:05
16.	"StarGirl★StarBoy -BuiBui Mix-"	leonn	Hibino	Tomoya Minami	4:29
17.	"I no Standard -Popsicle Mix-" (Iのスタンダード -Popsicle Mix-; I no Sutandādo -Popsicle Mix-)	leonn	Hibino	Hibino	7:15
Total length:					1:10:37

=== DVD ===
1. Liner Notes-ng 2011

== Notes ==
- "Haruiro no Sora" sung by #6 Erica Tonooka, #21 Kaede Hashimoto, and #23 Yuna Itō.
- "4U" sung by #6 Erica Tonooka and #9 Rurika Yokoyama.
- "Makehende" sung by Kansai Idoling!!!, a special six members sub-group which all members were born in Kansai region. They are #11 Suzuka Morita (Kyoto), #19 Yurika Tachibana (Shiga), #20 Ai Ōkawa (Hyogo), #22 Ruka Kurata (Osaka), and #24 Manami Nomoto (Osaka). The song included on the album as a gift after the song breached the top 50 on USEN ranking. A special music video was created after the song managed to breach the top 30.
