= Shout!!! =

Single by Idoling!!!
- Released: November 13, 2013
- Genre: Japanese pop
- Length: 12:16 (Limited Edition Type A); 10:27 (Limited Edition Type B); 17:30 (Normal Edition)
- Label: Pony Canyon

Idoling!!! singles chronology
"Summer Lion" (2013)	"Shout!!!" (2013)

Shout!!! (シャウト!!!, Shauto!!!) is the 21st single from the Japanese idol group Idoling!!!. It reached number 3 on M-ON! Countdown 100, number 2 on Music Station Single Ranking, and number 6 on Oricon Weekly Chart. Idoling!!! was divided into two groups. The main body of the group stayed with the name Idoling!!!, while the other group was called Idoling NEO. Idoling NEO consists of Idoling!!!'s new members, who just joined in August 2013, with addition of #23 Yuna Ito and #25 Kaoru Goto. Both groups released a single at the same time, with Idoling!!! releasing Shout!!! as their 21st single under the Pony Canyon label and Idoling NEO released mero mero as their first single under the Avex label. Both had to compete on the Oricon weekly chart for which group sold more than the other. The losing side will then receive a severe punishment.

On November 25, 2013, it was announced that Idoling NEO lost in the competition. Idoling NEO has to receive the punishment, which is having to wear skinny tights.

== Contents ==
Shout!!! was released in three types:

- Limited A-type Edition (CD and DVD)
- Limited B-type Edition (CD and Blu-ray)
- Normal Edition (CD)

Each of the covers of the Limited A and B features the same five main vocal members in the front with different supporting members behind the main vocalists. The main vocalists are #14 Hitomi Sakai, #15 Nao Asahi, #16 Ami Kikuchi, #21 Kaede Hashimoto, #29 Ramu Tamagawa.

The Limited A cover features the main vocalists and #6 Erica Tonooka, #12 Yui Kawamura, #17 Hitomi Miyake, #20 Ai Okawa, #26 Chika Ojima, #28 Karen Ishida.

The Limited B cover features the main vocalists and #3 Mai Endo, #9 Rurika Yokoyama, #13 Serina Nagano, #19 Yurika Tachibana, #22 Ruka Kurata, #27 Kurumi Takahashi, #30 Reia Kiyoku.

== Track listing ==
=== Limited A-type edition ===
==== CD ====
No.	Title	Lyrics	Music	Arrangement	Length
1.	"Shout!!!" (シャウト!!!)	Yuuji Kobayashi, MEG.ME	Yuuji Kobayashi, Kagatsume TADD	T-GREEN	3:31
2.	"I'd Ring"	SAKRA	SAKRA	SAKRA	5:14
3.	"Shout!!! (Instrumental)" (シャウト!!! (Instrumental))		Yuuji Kobayashi, Kagatsume TADD	T-GREEN	3:31

==== DVD ====
1. Shout!!! -Music Video-
2. Shout!!! -MV Dancing Ver.1-
3. Shout!!! MV Making-of
4. Omake no Shout!!!

=== Limited B-type edition ===
==== CD ====
No.	Title	Lyrics	Music	Arrangement	Length
1.	"Shout!!!" (シャウト!!!)	Yuuji Kobayashi, MEG.ME	Yuuji Kobayashi, Kagatsume TADD	T-GREEN	3:31
2.	"Only One"	Yuuji Kobayashi	Yuuji Kobayashi	Yuuji Kobayashi	3:28
3.	"Only One (Instrumental)"	Yuuji Kobayashi	Yuuji Kobayashi	Yuuji Kobayashi	3:28

==== Blu-ray ====
1. Shout!!! -Music Video-
2. Shout!!! -MV Dancing Ver.1-
3. Shout!!! -MV Dancing Ver.2-
4. Shout!!! MV Making-of
5. Omake no Shout!!!

=== Normal edition ===
==== CD ====
No.	Title	Lyrics	Music	Arrangement	Length
1.	"Shout!!!" (シャウト!!!)	Yuuji Kobayashi, MEG.ME	Yuuji Kobayashi, Kagatsume TADD	T-GREEN	3:31
2.	"I'd Ring"	SAKRA	SAKRA	SAKRA	5:14
3.	"Shout!!! (Instrumental)" (シャウト!!! (Instrumental))		Yuuji Kobayashi, Kagatsume TADD	T-GREEN	3:31
4.	"I'd Ring (Instrumental)"		SAKRA	SAKRA	5:14

== Notes ==
1. #23 Yuna Ito and #25 Kaoru Goto do not participate in this single. They are temporarily transferred to Idoling NEO.
2. Only One is performed by the 1st generation members; #3 Mai Endo, #6 Erica Tonooka, #9 Rurika Yokoyama. This is the second song performed by this trio, with the song voice on the single Sakura Thank You being the first one.
