= Te no Hira no Yūki =

2009 single by Idoling!!!

Single by Idoling!!!
- Released: December 2, 2009
- Genre: Japanese pop
- Length: 17:41
- Label: Pony Canyon
- Songwriters: Ai Kawashima, K-LaB

Idoling!!! singles chronology
"Mujōken Kōfuku" (2009)	"Te no Hira no Yūki" (2009)	"Love Magic Fever" (2009)

Te no Hira no Yūki (手のひらの勇気, Courage in the Palm of the Hand) is the 9th single from the Japanese idol group Idoling!!! and was released under the sub-unit name "Tokimeki Idoling!!!" (ときめきアイドリング!!!). It reached number 17 on the Oricon weekly chart and sold 7,316 copies in the first week.

== Contents ==
Te no Hira no Yūki was released only in a Normal Edition (CD only).

== Track listing ==
=== CD ===
No.	Title	Lyrics	Music	Arrangement	Length
1.	"Te no Hira no Yūki" (手のひらの勇気)	Ai Kawashima	K-LaB	Ai Kawashima	4:19
2.	"Rainy Girl" (レイニィガール)	leonn	Katsumi Ōnishi	Katsumi Ōnishi	4:34
3.	"Te no Hira no Yūki (instrumental)" (手のひらの勇気 (instrumental))		K-LaB	Ai Kawashima	4:19
4.	"Rainy Girl (instrumental)" (レイニィガール (instrumental))		Katsumi Ōnishi	Katsumi Ōnishi	4:34

== Notes ==
1. "Te no Hira no Yūki" was used as an opening theme song in the Konami game Tokimeki Memorial 4 for the PlayStation Portable. This song was the only song performed under the sub-unit "Tokimeki Idoling!!!".
2. "Rainy Girl", despite being included in this sub-unit single release, was performed by all Idoling!!! members.
3. Sub-unit "Tokimeki Idoling!!!" members are #3 Mai Endō, #6 Erica Tonooka, #9 Rurika Yokoyama, #11 Suzuka Morita, #17 Hitomi Miyake, #19 Yurika Tachibana, and #20 Ai Ōkawa.
4. #11 Suzuka Morita did not appear in the "Te no Hira no Yūki" music video due to her being occupied with TV Asahi's Samurai Sentai Shinkenger filming schedule.
5. "Tokimeki Idoling!!!" features all of the members wearing school uniforms inspired by Tokimeki Memorial 4. At the time this single was released, all members were active school girls except for #3 Mai Endō.
