= Mamore =

Mamore may refer to:

- Mamore, settlement in the Rosneath peninsula near Rahane, Scotland
  - John Campbell of Mamore (c. 1660–1729), Scottish Member of Parliament
  - John Campbell, 4th Duke of Argyll (c. 1693–1770), his son, known as Campbell of Mamore before his succession to the dukedom
- The Mamores, group of mountains in Lochaber, Scotland
- Mamoré River, in Bolivia and Brazil
  - Mamoré Province, in Bolivia
  - Mamore arboreal rice rat, native to Bolivia
- Mamore!, 2012 single from Japanese group Idoling!!!
