= The Ancient Dogoo Girl =

- Country of origin: Japan
- Original language: Japanese
- No. of seasons: 2
- No. of episodes: 24

Original release
- Release: October 7, 2009 – December 22, 2010

The Ancient Dogoo Girl (古代少女ドグちゃん, Kodai Shōjo Doguchan; "Ancient Girl Dogu-chan") is a Japanese comedy tokusatsu series directed by Noboru Iguchi, director of The Machine Girl and RoboGeisha. The show aired on MBS every Wednesday night at 25:25 JST. The ending theme is Denki Groove's "Dareda!" (誰だ!).

In October 2010, Dogoo Girl premiered its sequel The Ancient Dogoo Girls (古代少女隊ドグーンV, Kodai Shōjotai Dogūn Faibu; "Ancient Girl Squad Dogoon 5"). The show adds five more Dogoo Girls portrayed by Misaki Momose, Rina Takeda, Manami Nomoto (of Idoling!!!), Maria Yoshikawa, and Haruka Dan. The theme song for the sequel is "Bakuha Seyo! Dogoon V" (爆破せよ!ドグーンV, Bakuha Seyo! Dogūn Faibu; "It's a Blast! Dogoon V").

== Plot ==
By chance, a hikikomori named Makoto Sugihara finds a strange breastplate buried in the woods. When he places his palm on the breast plate, its design gets burned into his palm while the action awakens a girl named Dogu-chan, a hyperactive yōkai hunter from the Jōmon period with large breasts. Because he had touched her breastplate, Makoto is now bound to Dogu-chan as she adapts to modern day life, fighting yōkai in magic armor formed by her dogū assistant Dokigoro while slowly prying Makoto out of his shell as he is dragged into her misadventures, whether he likes it or not.

In the sequel, a college student named Shouta Tsuikimiya moves into the house where his archaeologist father, Yuzo, had last been living when he disappeared. Shouta inadvertently awakens Doji-chan, a novice yōkai hunter, when he finds her breastplate half-buried in the garden of the house. As if juggling his classes with dealing with the clingy and doting Doji-chan were not enough, Shouta soon finds that Doji-chan's fellow apprentices, as well as their mentor (Dogu-chan from the previous series), have taken up residence in his house as well.

== Episodes ==
Each episode is named after the yōkai Dogu-chan fights. The literal translation of the yōkai's name is given in the episode titles below. The guest star who portrays the yōkai is also listed.

1. Yōkai Koi Person Appears (妖怪 鯉びと 登場, Yōkai Koibito Tōjō)
2. Yōkai Big Breasts Appears (妖怪 ちちでか 登場, Yōkai Chichideka Tōjō)
3. Yōkai Neglected Bicycle (妖怪 放置自転車 登場, Yōkai Hōchijitensha Tōjō)
4. Yōkai Rude Odor (妖怪 無礼香 登場, Yōkai Mureika Tōjō)
5. Yōkai Crab Laser (妖怪 カニ光線 登場, Yōkai Kani Kōsen Tōjō)
6. Yōkai Puppeteer (妖怪 人形つかい 登場, Yōkai Ningyōtsukai Tōjō)
7. Yōkai Beep (妖怪 ピーオン 登場, Yōkai Pīon Tōjō)
8. Yōkai Some Kind of Koi (妖怪 鯉しくて 登場, Yōkai Koi Shikute Tōjō)
9. Yōkai Meat-Eating Sisters (妖怪 肉食姉妹 登場, Yōkai Nikushoku Shimai Tōjō)
10. Yōkai Mock Parent (妖怪 親もどき 登場, Yōkai Shin Modoki Tōjō)
11. Yōkai Mother of Eyelids (Part 1) (妖怪 まぶたの母 登場（前編）, Yōkai Mabuta no Haha Tōjō (Zenpen))
12. Yōkai Mother of Eyelids (Part 2) (妖怪 まぶたの母 登場（後編）, Yōkai Mabuta no Haha Tōjō (Kōhen))

Dogoon V

1. Yōkai Gorgon Appears (妖怪 ゴーコン 登場, Yōkai Gōgon Tōjō)
2. Yōkai Muscle Girl Squad Appears (妖怪 筋肉少女隊 登場, Yōkai Kinniku Shōjo Tai Tōjō)
3. Yōkai Skinship Appears (妖怪 スキンシップ 登場, Yōkai Sukinshippu Tōjō)
4. Yōkai Free and Easy EX Appears (妖怪 無礼講EX 登場, Yōkai Bureikō Ī Ekkusu Tōjō)
5. Yōkai Forest Girl Appears (妖怪 森ガール 登場, Yōkai Mori Gāru Tōjō)
6. Yōkai Future Memory Appears (妖怪 未来の想い出 登場, Yōkai Mirai no Omoide Tōjō)
7. Yōkai Hello Ao-chan Appears (妖怪 こんにちは青ちゃん 登場, Yōkai Konnichi wa Aochan Tōjō)
8. Yōkai Doka-san Appears (妖怪 ドカちん 登場, Yōkai Dokasan Tōjō)
9. Space Girl Squad Shakos III Appears (宇宙少女隊シャコーズIII 登場, Uchū Shōjo Tai Shakōzu Surī Tōjō)
10. Yōkai Giant Apartment Wife Appears (妖怪 巨大団地妻 登場, Yōkai Kyodai Danchi Tsuma Tōjō)
11. Yōkai Closing Shell Appears (Part 1) (妖怪 最終貝 登場（前編）, Yōkai Saishūkai Tōjō (Zenpen))
12. Yōkai Closing Shell Appears (Part 2) (妖怪 最終貝 登場（後編）, Yōkai Saishūkai Tōjō (Kōhen))

== Cast ==
- Dogu-chan (ドグちゃん): Erika Yazawa (谷澤 恵里香, Yazawa Erika) of Idoling!!!
- Makoto Sugihara (杉原 誠, Sugihara Makoto): Masataka Kubota
- Dokigoro (ドキゴロー, Dokigorō; Voice): Romi Park (朴 璐美, Paku Romi)
- Kimika Shishido (宍戸 紀美香, Shishido Kimika): Rina Kirishima (桐島 里菜, Kirishima Rina)
- Shintarō Kadoma (門間 慎太郎, Kadoma Shintarō): Tokio Emoto (柄本 時生, Emoto Tokio)
- Sayuri Sugihara (杉原 小百合, Sugihara Sayuri): Yuki Saito (斉藤 由貴, Saitō Yuki)
- Kenzō Sugihara (杉原 謙三, Sugihara Kenzō): Takaya Kamikawa (上川 隆也, Kamikawa Takaya)

Dogoon V

- Doji-chan (ドジちゃん): Misaki Momose (桃瀬 美咲, Momose Misaki)
- Doro-chan (ドロちゃん): Rina Takeda (武田 梨奈, Takeda Rina)
- Doka-chan (ドカちゃん): Manami Nomoto (野元 愛, Nomoto Manami) of Idoling!!!
- Dore-chan (ドレちゃん): Maria Yoshikawa (吉川 まりあ, Yoshikawa Maria)
- Dori-chan (ドリちゃん): Haruka Dan (團 遥香, Dan Haruka)
- Shota Tsukimiya (月宮 翔太, Tsukimiya Shōta): Shogo Suzuki (鈴木 勝吾, Suzuki Shōgo)
- Yuzo Tsukimiya (月宮 雄三, Tsukimiya Yūzō): Teruhiko Saigō (西郷 輝彦, Saigō Teruhiko)

=== Guest stars ===
- Sonim
- Honoka (穂花, Honoka)
- Hiromasa Taguchi (田口 浩正, Taguchi Hiromasa)
- Kinuo Yamada (山田 キヌヲ, Yamada Kinuo)
- Noboru Iguchi (井口 昇, Iguchi Noboru)
- Shigeru Saiki (斉木 しげる, Saiki Shigeru)
- Yumi Adachi
- Naoto Takenaka (竹中 直人, Takenaka Naoto)
- Itsumi Ōsawa (大沢 逸美, Ōsawa Itsumi)
- Mayumi Satō (佐藤 真弓, Satō Mayumi)
- Jun Miho (美保 純, Miho Jun)

Dogoon V

- Sei Ashina
- Yuko Ito
- Kenji Ohtsuki
- Megumi Kagurazaka
- Ayumu Saitō (斎藤 歩, Saitō Ayumu)
- Momoko Tani (谷 桃子, Tani Momoko)

== Movie adaptation ==
On February 9, 2010, Outcast Cinema announced the film adaptation of the series. Several episodes of the show (including its unaired pilot), helmed by various directors, were edited into a feature film which debuted theatrically in Japan on February 20, 2010.
