= Tonooka =

Tonooka is a Japanese surname. Notable people with the surname include:

- Erica Tonooka (born 1991), Japanese actress
- Sumi Tonooka (born 1956), American jazz pianist and composer
