= S.O.W. Sense of Wonder =

Single by Idoling!!!
- Released: January 27, 2010
- Genre: Japanese pop
- Length: 16:21
- Label: Pony Canyon
- Songwriters: leonn, Hibino Hirofumi

Idoling!!! singles chronology
"Love Magic Fever" (2009)	"S.O.W. Sense of Wonder" (2010)	"Me ni wa Aoba, Yama Hototogisu, Hatsukoi" (2010)

Alternative cover
- Limited Edition CD Cover

Alternative cover
- FAIRY TAIL Edition CD Cover

"S.O.W. Sense of Wonder" (S.O.W. センスオブワンダー, S.O.W. Sensu obu wandā) is the 11th single from the Japanese idol group Idoling!!!. It reached number 6 on the Oricon weekly chart and sold 17,098 copies in the first week.

== Contents ==
"S.O.W. Sense of Wonder" was released in three types:

- Limited Edition (CD and DVD)
- FAIRY TAIL Edition (CD and DVD)
- Normal Edition (CD only)

The FAIRY TAIL edition features Lucy Heartfilia, Natsu Dragneel, Happy, and Plue on the cover. Limited and Normal editions feature Idoling!!! members wearing costumes inspired by Lucy Heartfilia's costume on the FAIRY TAIL edition cover.

== Track listing ==
=== CD ===
No.	Title	Lyrics	Music	Arrangement	Length
1.	"S.O.W. Sense of Wonder" (S.O.W. センスオブワンダー, S.O.W. Sensu obu wandā)	leonn	Hibino Hirofumi	Hibino Hirofumi	4:00
2.	"Don't be afraid"	leonn	BOUNCEBACK	Tooru Watanabe	4:13
3.	"Kishuhen Ecstasy" (機種変エクスタシィ, Kishuhen Ekusutashi)	Sakai Kensaku	Hibino Hirofumi	Hibino Hirofumi	4:09
4.	"S.O.W. Sense of Wonder" (S.O.W. センスオブワンダー, S.O.W. Sensu obu wandā)		Hibino Hirofumi	Hibino Hirofumi	4:00

=== DVD ===
==== Limited Edition ====
1. S.O.W. Sense of Wonder music video
2. Making-of S.O.W. Sense of Wonder music video

==== FAIRY TAIL Edition ====
1. S.O.W. Sense of Wonder music video
2. Credit-less Fairy Tail opening video

== Notes ==
1. "S.O.W. Sense of Wonder" was used as an opening song in the anime Fairy Tail from episode 12 until episode 24.
2. "Don't be afraid" was used as ending theme song for Fuji TV's reality show "Kiseki Taiken! Unbelievable" from January - March 2010.
3. Idoling!!! covered a TRF song "EZ DO DANCE" which was rearranged by Hibino Hirofumi. This cover song used most of the musical arrangement from "Kishuhen Ecstacy".
