= Ganbare Otome (Warai)/Friend =

Single by Idoling!!!

from the album Daiji na Mono
- B-side: "Kimi ga Suki" "Hyakkaryōran Idoling!!!"
- Released: July 11, 2007
- Recorded: 2007
- Genre: Pop
- Label: Pony Canyon

Idoling!!! singles chronology
"Ganbare Otome (Warai)/Friend"	""Snow Celebration/Moteki no Uta""

"Ganbare Otome (Warai)/Friend" (ガンバレ乙女（笑）/friend, lit. "Go For it, Girls (Haha)") is the debut single by pop girl group Idoling!!!. It was released both as a normal single, and a limited edition CD+DVD. Each copy of the normal edition contains 20 special trading cards. The DVD edition contains the Ganbare Otome (Warai) PV, as well as a special program, containing images of the girls in swimsuits. The single reached a peak of #13 on the Oricon weekly charts, and charted for eight weeks. The third track, "Hyakkaryōran Idoling!!!", was used as the image song of the Odaiba School 2008 Culture Festival. "Friend" was used as an ending theme of the anime Reborn!.

== Track listings ==
=== CD ===
1. "Ganbare Otome (Warai)" (ガンバレ乙女（笑）; "Go For it, Girls (Haha))
2. "Friend"
3. "Kimi ga Suki" (キミがスキ; "I Love You")
4. "Hyakkaryōran Idoling!!!" (百花繚乱アイドリング!!!)
  - (Note: This can be translated in many different ways - as many flowers blooming simultaneously, a gathering of beautiful women, or a simultaneous emergence of many talents.)
5. "Ganbare Otome (Warai) (Instrumental)" (ガンバレ乙女（笑）（インストゥルメンタル）)

=== DVD ===
1. "Ganbare Otome (Warai) PV Idoling!!! Tokubetsu Hen" (ガンバレ乙女(笑) PV アイドリング!!!特別編, Go For it, Girls (Haha) PV Idoling!!! Special Compilation)
