= Mujōken Kōfuku =

Single by Idoling
- Released: July 22, 2009
- Genre: J-pop
- Label: Pony Canyon

Idoling singles chronology
"baby blue"	"Mujōken Kōfuku"	"Te no Hira no Yūki"

Mujōken Kōfuku (無条件☆幸福, Unconditional☆Bliss) is the eighth single by the Japanese idol group Idoling. As well as the normal single, it was released in an A and B limited edition format, each containing its own DVD. Version A contains the Mujōken Kōfuku PV, as well as filming the photo-shoot for the jacket photos and for the video itself. Version B contains the baby blue PV, as well as "making of" filming of the video. Special trading cards were included with the normal edition, with eighteen in each copy. Mujōken Kōfuku was used as the ending song of Fuji TV's "Raion no Gokigenyō" from 29 June 2009 until 25 September 2009. Its highest position on the Oricon chart was #5.

== Track listings ==
=== CD ===
1. Mujōken Kōfuku (無条件☆幸福, Unconditional☆Bliss)
2. Hōkago Terepashī (放課後テレパシィ, After-School Telepathy)
3. U
4. Mujōken Kōfuku (Instrumental) (無条件☆幸福（instrumental）)

=== DVD ===
Limited Edition A

1. Mujōken Kōfuku (PV)
2. Mujōken Kōfuku (PV & CD - Jacket Photography & "Making of" Filming)

Limited Edition B

1. baby blue (PV)
2. baby blue (PV - "Making of" Filming)
