= One Up!!!/Ichigo Gyūnyū =

Single by Idoling!!!
- Released: August 8, 2012
- Genre: Japanese pop
- Length: 21:09 (Limited Edition Type A); 21:11 (Limited Edition Type B); 17:09 (Normal Edition)
- Label: Pony Canyon
- Composer: Tooru Watanabe
- Lyricist: leonn

One Up!!!/Ichigo Gyūnyū (One Up!!! / 苺牛乳; "One Up!!!" / "Strawberry Milk") is the 18th single from Japanese idol group Idoling!!!. It reached number 4 on the Oricon weekly chart and number 5 on Music Station Power Ranking. It is the first single to feature Idoling!!! 5th generation members who joined in April 2012.

== Contents ==
One Up!!!/Ichigo Gyūnyū released in three types:

- Limited A-type (CD and DVD)
- Limited B-type (CD and Blu-ray)
- Normal Type (CD only)

== Track listing ==
=== CD ===
| No. | Title | Lyrics | Music | Arrangement | Length |
|---|---|---|---|---|---|
| 1. | "One Up!!!" | leonn | Tooru Watanabe | Hirofumi Hibino | 4:04 |
| 2. | "Ichigo Gyūnyū" (苺牛乳) | Makoto Miyazaki | Makoto Miyazaki | Makoto Miyazaki | 4:31 |
| 3. | "Megami no Pulse" (女神のパルス, Megami no Parusu) | leonn | Tooru Watanabe | Katsumi Onishi | 4:00 |
| 4. | "Sayonara Junjyō" (サヨナラ純情) | leonn | Hirofumi Hibino | Hirofumi Hibino | 4:07 |
| 5. | "One Up!!! (Instrumental)" | | Tooru Watanabe | Hirofumi Hibino | 4:04 |
| 6. | "Ichigo Gyūnyū (Instrumental)" (苺牛乳 (Instrumental)) | | Makoto Miyazaki | Makoto Miyazaki | 4:31 |

=== DVD ===
1. One Up!!! -Music Video-
2. One Up!!! -Dancing Ver.-
3. Making of One Up!!! MV

=== Blu-ray ===
1. One Up!!! -Music Video-
2. One Up!!! -Dancing Ver.-
3. Making of One Up!!! MV
4. Ichigo Gyūnyū -Music Video-
5. Ichigo Gyūnyū -Solo Shot Ver.-
6. Making of Ichigo Gyūnyū MV

== Notes ==
1. Limited Edition Type A CD cover features 11 members: Mai Endo, Erica Tonooka, Rurika Yokoyama, Serina Nagano, Hitomi Sakai, Ami Kikuchi, Hitomi Miyake, Manami Nomoto, Kurumi Takahashi, Karen Ishida, and Reia Kiyoku.
2. Limited Edition Type B CD cover features 10 members: Yui Kawamura, Nao Asahi, Yurika Tachibana, Ai Ōkawa, Kaede Hashimoto, Ruka Kurata, Yūna Itō, Kaoru Gotō, Chika Ojima, and Ramu Tamagawa.
3. Megami no Pulse only available on Limited Edition Type A. Used as a CM song for Marudai Shokuhin Ganbare! Nippon! Campaign!
4. Sayonara Junjyō only available on Limited Edition Type B. Features Serina Nagano, Ami Kikuchi, Yurika Tachibana, and Ai Ōkawa as main vocals.
