= Mamore!!! =

Single by Idoling!!!
- Released: January 18, 2012
- Genre: Japanese pop
- Length: 16:49 (First Press Limited Edition); 12:52 (Normal Edition)
- Label: Pony Canyon
- Songwriters: leonn, Hibino Hirofumi

Idoling!!! singles chronology
"Big in Japan" (2011)	"Mamore!!!" (2012)	"One Up!!!/Ichigo Gyūnyū" (2012)

Mamore!!!, styled as MAMORE!!! is the 17th single from Japanese idol group Idoling!!!. Mamore!!! reached number 2 on the Oricon weekly chart and number 3 on Music Station Power Ranking.

== Contents ==
Mamore!!! was released in four types:

- Limited A-type (CD and DVD)
- Limited B-type (CD and Blu-ray)
- Limited C-type (CD and photobook)
- Normal Type (CD only)

== Track listing ==
=== CD ===
No.	Title	Lyrics	Music	Arrangement	Length
1.	"Mamore!!!"	leonn	Hibino Hirofumi	Hibino Hirofumi	4:07
2.	"Sara Sara Kyuuti Ko" (サラサラ★キューティコー)	Aiko Okumura	Makoto Miyazaki	Makoto Miyazaki	4:38
3.	"Bakkyun!" (バッキューン!)	Makoto Miyazaki, leonn	Makoto Miyazaki	Makoto Miyazaki	3:57
4.	"Mamore!!! (Instrumental)"		Hibino Hirofumi	Hibino Hirofumi	4:07

=== DVD ===
1. Mamore!!! Music video
2. Mamore!!! Dancing version
3. Mamore!!! Dancing version featuring Rurika & Ai
4. Making of Mamore!!! MV

=== Blu-ray ===
1. Mamore!!! Music video
2. Mamore!!! Music video, close up version
3. Mamore!!! Dancing version
4. Mamore!!! Dancing Version featuring Rurika & Ai
5. Making of Mamore!!! MV
6. Martin Solveig & Dragonette featuring Idoling!!!

== Notes ==
1. Mamore!!! used as Fuji TV Kiseki Taiken! Unbelievable ending theme song for January - March 2012.
2. Sara Sara Kyuuti Ko used as TBS Hanamaru Market ending theme song for January - March 2012. Participating members on this song are Erica Tonooka, Rurika Yokoyama, Hitomi Sakai, Kaede Hashimoto, Ruka Kurata, Kaoru Gotou, and Chika Ojima.
3. Bakkyun! only available on first press limited edition. Participating members are Suzuka Morita, Hitomi Miyake, and Yurika Tachibana.
