= Mai Endo =

Japanese idol singer from Tokyo

- 遠藤 舞
- Born: July 31, 1988 (age 38); Tokyo, Japan
- Height: 1.62 m (5 ft 4 in) (2011)

Mai Endo (遠藤 舞, Endō Mai; born July 31, 1988) is a Japanese idol, singer and talent from Tokyo. She was a member and former leader of the Japanese idol group Idoling!!!. She is represented by Box Corporation talent agency. She made her solo debut as a singer on July 13, 2013.

== Career ==
Two weeks before being scouted for the Idoling!!! audition, she was a normal high school student who was planning on entering a school for cosmetology. In November 2006, she passed the Idoling!!! audition and entered the group as number 3. In March 2009, when the former leader, Sayaka Katō, graduated, she became the next leader of the group. In May 2011, she starred in, and sang the theme song for an independent film Koneko no Kimochi (コネコノキモチ). The theme song was entitled "Sora no Ki" (空の木).

Her number in Idoling!!! is 3, and her image flower is the Japanese camellia. She belongs to the same talent agency as fellow members Erica Tonooka, Serina Nagano, Yuna Itō and Karen Ishida.

After being in the group for 7.5 years, she graduated from Idoling!!! on February 14, 2014, at Zepp DiverCity in Odaiba, Tokyo to focus on her solo career.

== Discography ==
=== Singles ===
- Today is the Day (2013.07.31) Binyl Records
- MUJINA (2014.05.14) Binyl Records
- Baby Love (2014.08.06) Binyl Records

== Filmography ==
=== Movies ===
- Kuchisake Onna 0 Beginning (2008)
- Abashiri Ikka The Movie (2009)
- Re:Play-Girls (2010)
- Koneko no Kimochi (2011)

=== TV dramas ===
- Tetsudo Musume (2008–2009)
- ShakenBabyY! Shakespeare Syndrome (2010) Fuji TV
- Kurohyou 2 Ryu ga Gotoku Asura-hen (2011) MBS

=== TV shows ===
- Idoling!!! (October 2006 – present) Fuji TV
- Aikatsu!! (December 2011 – present) Music Japan TV
- Box TV (September 2010 - July 2011) Enta!371, Pigoo HD

=== Image video ===
- Maipuru (October 26, 2007)
- Fantasy (August 20, 2008)
- Maipuru Mode (February 18, 2009)
- Kaze no Tani no Maipuru (April 7, 2010)

=== TV commercials ===
- Ryu ga Gotoku of the End (2010) Fuji TV CS

=== Voice dubbing ===
- The Final Destination (October 17, 2009) as Nadia Monroy
- Dollhouse (August 4, 2010) as Ivy
- Robot Taekwon V (December 2010)

=== Live performance ===
- Endo Mai Solo Live "Mai" at Billboard Live Tokyo (May 20, 2012)

=== Internet shows ===
- Nishikawa Takanori no Ienomi!! on Nico Nico Douga channel (April 12 - December 20, 2012) with T.M.Revolution

== Bibliography ==
=== Photobooks ===
- Maipuru (October 25, 2007) ISBN 978-4775602539
- Mai Birthday (July 30, 2008) ISBN 978-4902307047
- Photore Vol.7 Endo Mai (March 30, 2012) ISBN 978-4863362185
