= Idoling!!! =

Japanese idol group

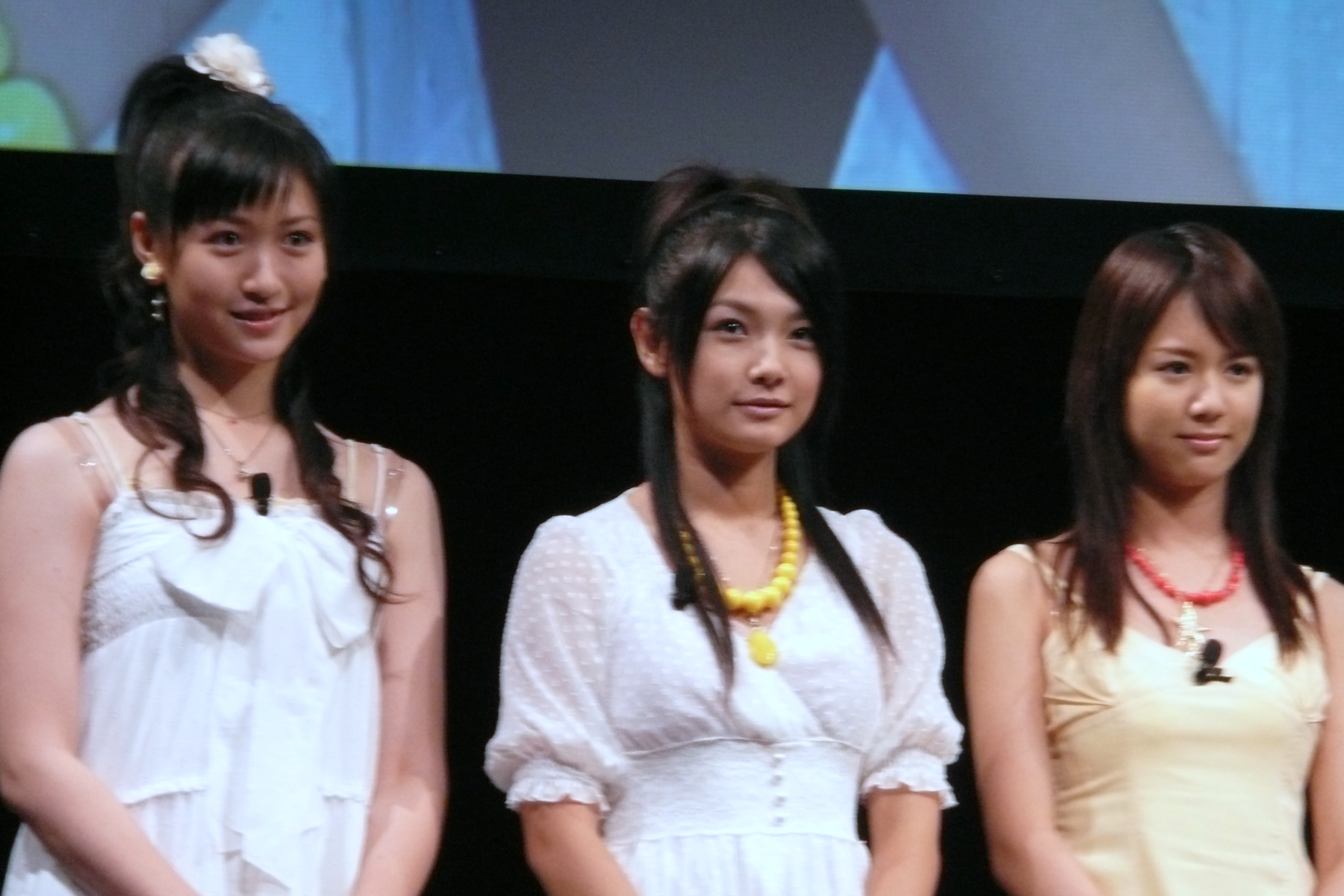
- Idoling!!! (L-R:Rurika Yokoyama, Erica Tonooka, Mai Endo)

Background information
- Origin: Odaiba, Tokyo, Japan
- Genres: J-pop, pop, teen pop, pop rock, bubblegum pop, dance-pop
- Years active: 2006–2015
- Labels: Pony Canyon; Fuji Television
- Website: www.fujitv.co.jp/idoling

Official Idoling!!! logo

Idoling!!! (アイドリング!!!, Aidoringu!!!) was a Japanese TV show with an attached female idol group created by Fuji TV. The concept of the group was to watch as the girls grow as idols and experience various things. Idoling's main source of exposure was their TV show, which aired several new episodes every week on FUJI TV ONE, with more than 1000 episodes broadcast since October 30, 2006. Over the years of the show, Idoling!!! released 7 studio albums, 24 singles, collaborated with other idol groups (such as AKB48), released DVD specials and gave many live performances and concerts. The group officially disbanded on October 27, 2015, with the graduation of all remaining members.

== History ==
=== 2006–2010 ===
In October, 2006 auditions were held for 50 people in agencies, and 9 idols were chosen out of them. The audition videos were released on a DVD that accompanied their first single, while the members' first meet-and-greet was featured on the DVD that accompanied their first album, Daiji na Mono.

On March 3, 2008, it was announced that new members would join the group, and then on March 31, on Fuji Television's official site, photos, names and ages of the new members were revealed. With the addition of new members, the group doubled to 18 members until Maia Kobayashi (#10) left shortly after her debut to focus on her education.

On January 18, 2009, Rumi Koizumi (#2) announced her graduation from Idoling!!! due in part to health concerns. Soon after, it was announced that Sayaka Kato (#1), Maria Eto (#4), Mira Takiguchi (#5) and Michelle Miki (#18) would all graduate from Idoling!!! in March 2009. Shortly after the departure of these members, three new members were added to commemorate the official third generation of Idoling!!!: Yurika Tachibana (#19), Ai Ōkawa (#20) and Idoling!!!'s youngest member yet, Kaede Hashimoto (#21).

On October 1, 2009, Idoling!!! opened auditions for its fourth generation to debut in Spring 2010, with the audition process carrying on into February 2010. The new members were announced on March 6. In April 2010, the new fourth generation members were introduced in the show: Ruka Kurata (#22), Yūna Itō (#23), Manami Nomoto (#24), Kaoru Gotō (#25) and Chika Ojima (#26).

=== 2011 ===
In February 2011, all members left Japan for the first time, and went to Taiwan. They did a small live promotion, broadcast on TV, for the release of their third album SUNRISE in Taiwan. This marks their first official release outside Japan.

On April 12, 2011, it was announced that Kaoru Gotō (#25) would take a six-month hiatus from Idoling!!! to deal with a family emergency. At the end of April 2011, Idoling!!! appeared on their second regular program, "Fuji TV Kara no~!" with host Yamazaki of the comedy duo, "Untouchable". At the end of August 2011 Kaoru Gotō (#25) returned from her hiatus and on Tokyo Idol Festival 2011 appeared on stage with the group. On October 1, 2011, Idoling!!! opened auditions for its fifth generation to debut in Spring 2012, with the audition process carrying until the end of November. The 15 finalists were presented at their eleventh live concert on December 4, 2011. The fans voted through a voting ID that comes with Idoling's 17th single "MAMORE!!!". The new members were announced during an event in February.

October 2011 saw the release of Idoling!!!'s first international collaboration on the fourth single from the album Smash of French DJ Martin Solveig with the song "Big In Japan", which also featured Canadian electronic music band Dragonette. A music video with Idoling!!! was released in October 2011. Shortly afterwards Idoling!!! released a video thanking Martin Solveig and expressed their wish to go to France. Just a week after their 11th Live, on December 11, 2011 Erika Yazawa (#7) and Phongchi (#8) announced their graduation from the group to pursue a career as talents. On December 23 a final graduation live concert was held. Neither of them were included in the single "MAMORE!!!".

=== 2012 ===
On March 2, 2012, the new fifth generation members were introduced on the show: Kurumi Takahashi (#27), Karen Ishida (#28), Ramu Tamagawa (#29), and Reia Kiyoku (#30).

On April 17, 2012, Fuji TV announced partnership with Google YouTube, including the Idoling!!! official YouTube channel. During press conference, Idoling!!! greeted in 15 languages. On May 9, 2012, the Idoling!!! official Facebook page was created but not yet active until July 19.

On May 30, 2012, Suzuka Morita officially graduated from Idoling!!!. Graduation Live was held on the same day at Zepp DiverCity Tokyo. On June 3, 2012, Idoling!!! started their first tour titled "Hatsu da!Tour da!!Zepp-ng!!!" (初だ!ツアーだ!!Zeppング!!!, Hatsu da!Tsua da!!Zeppunggu!!!; "First! Tour!! Zepp!!!"). On June 25, 2012, Idoling!!! took part in Yubi Matsuri, an idol festival produced by Rino Sashihara from AKB48. The concert was held at Nippon Budokan before a crowd of 8,000 people and featured such girl groups as Shiritsu Ebisu Chugaku, Super Girls, Tokyo Girls' Style, Nogizaka46, Passpo, Buono!, Momoiro Clover Z, and Watarirouka Hashiritai 7. On August 5, 2012, Idoling!!! announced their 12th Live to be held at NHK Hall on November 25. On August 10, 2012, Idoling!!! broadcast their 900th episode of their TV show on FUJI TV ONE.

On September 7, 2012, Idoling!!! sold a muffler towel with emblem design that resembled the emblem of J-League "Cerezo Osaka" Football Club. The item soon dropped from official website after being confirmed by Cerezo Osaka official. A few days later, Cerezo Osaka and Idoling!!! announced special collaboration. On September 20, during Cerezo Osaka vs F.C. Tokyo match fixture at Cerezo Osaka home ground "Kincho Stadium", five Idoling!!! members (#19 Tachibana, #20 Ōkawa, #22 Kurata, #23 Itō, #28 Ishida) performed three songs before the match at the main entrance and one song during the half-time at the pitch. All members wearing specially designed Cerezo Osaka uniform and to be called "Cerezo na Idoling!!!", except only Tachibana who was wearing F.C. Tokyo uniform due to her being F.C. Tokyo supporter, F.C. Tokyo TV show assistant and reporter.

On November 5, 2012, Idoling!!! announced official Niconico Channel. On December 26, 2012, #24 Nomoto announced graduation from Idoling!!! and retirement from entertainment business due to family circumstance.

=== 2013 ===
On January 18, all of the first generation members held a reunion live as they promised 5 years ago at Fuji TV Kyutai studio. Currently from the original nine members, six of them are already graduated from the group. On this event, they also talked about the inside story of the group's past. It was broadcast live on FUJI TV ONE titled "Hachitama Live 2013 presents First Generation Reunion Day Special" (はちたまライブ2013 presents 一期生再会の日SP!!!, Hachitama Raibu 2013 presents Ikkisei Saikai no Hi SP!!!). They promised to do a reunion event again in 2023.

On April 13, Rurika Yokoyama (#9) announced her solo debut at Idoling!!! Nishi e! Higashi e! Mystery Tour-ng!!! in Zepp Tokyo. A few months later on June 1, Mai Endō (#3) announced her solo debut at the tour final with a video message from Takanori Nishikawa.

On May 24, Idoling!!! celebrated their TV show's 1000th episode.

On June 27, Idoling!!! Producer, Seita Kadosawa, announced to leave his position in Idoling!!! project. Kadosawa stated that the Idoling!!! new members (6th generation) audition and the Idoling!!! 20th single "Summer Lion" are under the new Producer's management.

On July 8, it was revealed that the former Fuji TV show "Quiz! Hexagon" producer, Takashi Kanbara, is the new Idoling!!! Producer.

On July 17, Idoling!!! performed two songs at Ajinomoto Stadium before the J-league match between F.C. Tokyo against Ventforet Kofu. A few weeks later on August 28, Idoling!!! 20th Single "Summer Lion" melody was used by F.C. Tokyo supporters as one of their football chants for the first time during the match against Sagan Tosu.

On July 28, Idoling!!! 6th generation members, later to be called as Neo generation, were introduced at Tokyo Idol Festival 2013. They are Mayu Furuhashi (#31), Mayu Sekiya (#32), Ruka Hashimoto (#33), Rena Satō (#34), and Michaela Wako Satō (#35). It was revealed that Ruka Hashimoto is Kaede Hashimoto's real younger sister.

On August 28, a new group was announced and will be called as 'Idoling NEO'. Yūna Itō will also be transferring to this new group, later followed by Kaoru Gotō. It was also announced that both Idoling!!! and Idoling NEO will release a single on the same day sometime during November 2013. It will be a competition of who will rank the highest on the Oricon chart.

On December 8, it was announced during their 13th live concert that current leader Mai Endō would be graduating from the group on February 14, 2014, during a graduation live at Zepp DiverCity in Tokyo. After her graduation she will focus on her solo career.

=== 2015 ===
On February 28, it was announced that Idoling!!! would disband on October 27.

== Members ==
As of December 23, 2014, Idoling!!! had twenty one active members.

| No | Generation | Name | Flower | Birthday | Birthplace | Blood Type | Agency | Note |
|---|---|---|---|---|---|---|---|---|
| 6 | First (2006) | Erica Tonooka(leader) | Himawari (Sunflower) | 1991.06.11 | Kanagawa | A | Box Corporation | |
| 9 | First (2006) | Rurika Yokoyama | Yuri (Lily) | 1991.09.27 | Kanagawa | O | Production Ogi | |
| 12 | Second (2008) | Yui Kawamura (河村 唯, Kawamura Yui) | Sweet pea | 1989.08.05 | Shizuoka | A | Production Ogi | |
| 14 | Second (2008) | Hitomi Sakai (酒井 瞳, Sakai Hitomi) | Sumire (Violet) | 1989.05.03 | Miyazaki | O | Sony Music Artists Inc. | |
| 15 | Second (2008) | Nao Asahi (朝日 奈央, Asahi Nao) | Asagao (Japanese morning glory) | 1994.04.21 | Saitama | B | Vision Factory | |
| 17 | Second (2008) | Hitomi Miyake | Ran (Orchid) | 1992.07.10 | Tokyo | A | Biscuit Entertainment | |
| 19 | Third (2009) | Yurika Tachibana (橘 ゆりか, Tachibana Yurika) | Kasumisou (Baby's-breath) | 1992.12.23 | Shiga | A | avex vanguard | |
| 20 | Third (2009) | Ai Okawa | Bara (Rose) | 1993.07.17 | Hyogo | O | LesPros Entertainment | |
| 21 | Third (2009) | Kaede Hashimoto (橋本 楓, Hashimoto Kaede) | Suzuran (Lily of the valley) | 1997.01.21 | Kanagawa | A | Biscuit Entertainment | #33 Ruka Hashimoto's older sister |
| 22 | Fourth (2010) | Ruka Kurata (倉田 瑠夏, Kurata Ruka) | Gerbera | 1996.08.04 | Osaka | O | Avex Management | |
| 26 | Fourth (2010) | Chika Ojima (尾島 知佳, Ojima Chika) | Tsukimisou (Evening primrose, more specifically Oenothera tetraptera) | 1994.04.19 | Chiba | B | Horipro | |
| 27 | Fifth (2012) | Kurumi Takahashi (高橋 胡桃, Takahashi Kurumi) | Ayame (Japanese iris) | 1997.03.27 | Saitama | A | Biscuit Entertainment | |
| 28 | Fifth (2012) | Karen Ishida (石田 佳蓮, Ishida Karen) | Kalmia | 1997.08.06 | Fukuoka | A | Box Corporation | |
| 29 | Fifth (2012) | Ramu Tamagawa (玉川 来夢, Tamagawa Ramu) | Epidendrum | 1997.04.30 | Kanagawa | A | Biscuit Entertainment | |
| 31 | NEO/Sixth (2013) | Mayu Furuhashi (古橋 舞悠, Furuhashi Mayu) | Suisen (Narcissus) | 1998.10.30 | Kanagawa | O | Shochiku Geino | |
| 32 | NEO/Sixth (2013) | Mayu Sekiya (関谷 真由, Sekiya Mayu) | Plumeria | 1995.07.31 | Tokyo | A | avex artist academy | |
| 33 | NEO/Sixth (2013) | Ruka Hashimoto (橋本 瑠果, Hashimoto Ruka) | Carnation | 1999.09.25 | Kanagawa | AB | Biscuit Entertainment | #21 Kaede Hashimoto's younger sister. Currently the youngest member. |
| 34 | NEO/Sixth (2013) | Rena Sato (佐藤 麗奈, Satō Rena) | Iris | 1998.11.09 | Saitama | O | Box Corporation | |
| 35 | NEO/Sixth (2013) | Michaela Wako Sato (佐藤 ミケーラ 倭子, Satō Mikēra Wako) | Bougainvillea | 1996.04.17 | Tokyo | A | Avex Management | Half Brazilian |

=== Former members ===
| No | Name | Flower | Agency | Graduation |
|---|---|---|---|---|
| 10 | Maia Kobayashi (小林 麻衣愛, Kobayashi Maia) | Lavender | Fit-One | May 2008 |
| 2 | Rumi Koizumi (小泉 瑠美, Koizumi Rumi) | Dandelion | Biscuit Entertainment | January 2009 |
| 1 | Sayaka Katō (加藤 沙耶香, Katō Sayaka) (First Leader) | Cherry blossom | Fit-One | March 2009 |
| 4 | Maria Eto (江渡 万里彩, Eto Maria) | Argyranthemum | Shochiku Geino | March 2009 |
| 5 | Mira Takiguchi (滝口 ミラ, Takiguchi Mira) | Pansy | Horipro Osaka | March 2009 |
| 18 | Michelle Miki (ミシェル 未来, Misheru Miki) | Tagetes | Elite Japan | March 2009 |
| 7 | Erika Yazawa (谷澤 恵里香, Yazawa Erika) | Tulip | Horipro | December 2011 |
| 8 | Phongchi (フォンチー, Fonchii) | Hibiscus | SMA Entertainment Inc. | December 2011 |
| 11 | Suzuka Morita (森田 涼花, Morita Suzuka) | Rapeseed | Horipro Osaka | May 2012 |
| 24 | Manami Nomoto (野元 愛, Nomoto Manami) | Forget-me-not | Horipro Osaka | December 2012 |
| 3 | Mai Endo (遠藤 舞, Endō Mai) (Second Leader) | Tsubaki (Japanese Camellia) | Box Corporation | February 2014 |
| 25 | Kaoru Goto (後藤 郁, Gotō Kaoru) | Suiren (Water lily) | Horipro | June 2014 |
| 16 | Ami Kikuchi (菊地 亜美, Ami Kikuchi) | Anemone | LesPros Entertainment | November 2014 |
| 30 | Reia Kiyoku (清久 レイア, Kiyoku Reia) | Freesia | Production Ogi | December 2014 |
| 13 | Serina Nagano (長野 せりな, Nagano Serina) | Cosmos | Box Corporation | March 2015 |
| 23 | Yuna Ito (伊藤 祐奈, Itō Yuna) | Daisy | Box Corporation | April 2015 |

=== Timeline ===
- Black - hiatus
- Yuna Ito, Kaoru Goto, and the NEO generation members performed as "Idoling NEO," a separate subunit of Idoling!!!

== Discography ==
=== Idoling!!! Singles ===
| No. | Title | Release Date | Weekly Ranking * | First Week Sales * | Album | Note |
|---|---|---|---|---|---|---|
| 1 | "Ganbare Otome (Warai) / Friend" | 2007.07.11 | 13 | 10,163 | Daiji na Mono | |
| 2 | "Snow Celebration / Moteki no Uta" (Snow celebration/モテ期のうた) | 2008.01.23 | 9 | 14,880 | Daiji na Mono | |
| 3 | "Kokuhaku" | 2008.07.16 | 9 | 19,706 | Petit-Petit | |
| 4 | "Shokugyō: Idol" | 2008.11.19 | 5 | 14,670 | Petit-Petit | |
| 5 | "Hannin wa Anata Desu / Nagara" (犯人はあなたです♥/NA・GA・RA; "You're a Criminal" / "While Doing") | 2008.12.17 | 16 | 6,254 | Petit-Petit | Sub-unit Single |
| 6 | "Beta na Shitsuren (Shibuya ni Furu Yuki) / Haruka Naru Virgin Road" (ベタな失恋〜渋谷に降る雪〜/遥かなるバージンロード) | 2009.01.07 | 7 | 7,631 | Petit-Petit | Sub-unit Single |
| 7 | "baby blue" | 2009.04.29 | 10 | 14,383 | Petit-Petit | |
| 8 | "Mujōken Kōfuku" | 2009.07.22 | 5 | 10,868 | Petit-Petit | |
| 9 | "Te no Hira no Yūki" | 2009.12.01 | 17 | 7,316 | SUNRISE | Sub-unit Single |
| 10 | "Love Magic Fever" | 2009.12.15 | 10 | 8,444 | SUNRISE | Sub-unit Single |
| 11 | "S.O.W. Sense of Wonder" | 2010.01.27 | 6 | 17,098 | SUNRISE | |
| 12 | "Me ni wa Aoba, Yama Hototogisu, Hatsukoi" (目には青葉 山ホトトギス 初恋; "Sight of Aoba, Mountain Cuckoo, First Love") | 2010.06.09 | 6 | 27,707 | SISTERS | |
| 13 | "Poolside Daisakusen" (プールサイド大作戦, Pūrusaido Daisakusen; "Battle of the Poolside") | 2010.08.04 | 7 | 30,247 | SISTERS | |
| 14 | "eve" | 2010.11.23 | 5 | 39,923 | SISTERS | |
| 15 | "Yarakai Heart" | 2011.03.02 | 4 | 42,691 | SISTERS | |
| 16 | "Don't think. Feel !!!" | 2011.07.27 | 3 | 38,999 | GOLD EXPERIENCE | |
| 17 | "MAMORE!!!" | 2012.01.18 | 2 | 56,232 | GOLD EXPERIENCE | |
| 18 | "One Up!!!/Ichigo Gyūnyū" | 2012.08.08 | 4 | 42,796 | GOLD EXPERIENCE | |
| 19 | "Sakura Thank You" | 2013.02.13 | 3 | 37,456 | GOLD EXPERIENCE | |
| 20 | "Summer Lion" | 2013.08.07 | 6 | 40,745 | TBA | |
| 21 | "Shout!!!" | 2013.11.13 | 6 | 26,194 | TBA | |
| 22 | "Kyupi" | 2014.05.28 | 6 | 27,243 | TBA | |
| 23 | "Yuki Usagi" | 2014.12.24 | 6 | 26,344 | TBA | |
| 24 | "Cheering You!!!" | 2015.07.15 | 4 | 30,863 | TBA | |

* Data provided by Oricon Charts.

=== Idoling NEO Singles ===
| No. | Title | Release Date | Weekly Ranking * | First Week Sales * | Album |
|---|---|---|---|---|---|
| 1 | "mero mero" | 2013.11.13 | 14 | 13,155 | TBA |

* Data provided by Oricon Charts.

=== Albums ===
- 2008.02.27 - Daiji na Mono
- 2009.08.19 - Petit-Petit
- 2010.03.03 - SUNRISE
- 2011.02.11 - Sunrise (Taiwan Edition)
- 2011.03.16 - SISTERS
- 2014.01.08 - GOLD EXPERIENCE

=== Collaborations ===
| No. | Release title | Release Artist | Release date | Release Type | Song Performed | Associated Act |
|---|---|---|---|---|---|---|
| 1 | "Ponkikki Medley 2007" (ポンキッキメドレー2007) | Gachapin ・Mukku & Idoling!!! | 2007.09.26 | Single | Ponkikki Medley 2007 | Gachapin; Mukku |
| 2 | "Chū Shiyoze!" (チューしようぜ!) | AKB Idoling!!! | 2009.04.01 | Single | Chū Shiyoze!; Aitakatta^{1} | AKB48 |
| 3 | "Diversity" | Ichiro Ito | 2009.08.05 | Album | Shōjo Fuantei | Ichiro Ito |
| 4 | "Big in Japan" | Martin Solveig and Dragonette featuring Idoling!!! | 2011.10.24 | Single | Big in Japan | Martin Solveig; Dragonette |
| 5 | "TRF Respect Idol Tribute!!" (TRFリスペクトアイドルトリビュート!!) | IRF | 2012.12.19 | Album | BOY MEETS GIRL^{2}; EZ DO DANCE | TRF; BiS; Cheeky Parade; Tokyo Girls' Style; Dream5 |
| 6 | Zozozozozotte Zombitta | Idoling!!! x ZOMBIE SEASON | TBA | Single | | |
| 7 | "Summer Lion" | Idoling!!! | 2013.08.07 | Single | Milky Girl | Hana Taguchi (Sakura Gakuin) |

^{1} Each group exchanged a song. Idoling!!! performed the AKB48 song "Aitakatta" while AKB48 performed the Idoling!!! song "Moteki no Uta".
^{2} Each participating group represented one member. Idoling!!! was represented by #19 Yurika Tachibana.

== Filmography ==
=== Live and Concert ===
- 2008.06.18 - Idoling!!! 1st Live "Motto Ganbare Otome(Warai)"
- 2008.06.18 - Idoling!!! 2nd Live "Daiji na Mono"
- 2008.10.31 - Idoling!!! in Bouken'ou Final ~uRa no Ura Made Micchaku ng!!!~
- 2009.01.14 - Idoling!!! 3rd Live "Kimeru Nara Kono Natsussung!!!"
- 2009.06.24 - Idoling!!! 4th Live "Nanika ga Okoru Yokan ga...ng!!!"
- 2009.07.01 - Idoling!!! Sotsugyou Live ~Aratanaru Tabidaching!!!~
- 2009.10.21 - Idoling!!! in Odaiba Gasshuukoku ~uRa no Ura Made Micchakung!!!~
- 2009.12.25 - Idoling!!! Hachitama Live '09 SPRING
- 2010.04.21 - Idoling!!! 6th Live "Ya!O!ng!!!"
- 2010.05.19 - Idoling!!! Hachitama Live Autumn to Christmas
- 2010.07.07 - Idoling!!! 7th Live "Jinsei=Shugyounaring!!!"
- 2010.09.01 - Idoling!!! Hachitama Live '10 Winter & Audition
- 2010.11.17 - Idoling!!! 8th Live "Kono Kimochi wa Sou da Are da Koinandeshou ng!!!"
- 2010.12.22 - Idoling!!!×YGA Shinahachi Live in Shinagawa Yoshimoto Prince Theater & Osaka NGK
- 2011.02.09 - TOKYO IDOL FESTIVAL 2010
- 2011.05.18 - Idoling!!! 9th Live "Bonnou no Kazu dake Ai ga Aru! Oshougatsu eve ng!!!"
- 2011.11.16 - Idoling!!! 10th Live "Kangaeruna. Kanjirou! GO AHEADng!!!"
- 2012.01.27 - TOKYO IDOL FESTIVAL 2011 Eco&Smile feat. Idoling!!!
- 2012.06.06 - Idoling!!! 11th Live "Meccha Chikaizo! Big Egg ng!!!" (Blu-ray)
- 2012.12.19 - Idoling!!! Hatsu da! Tour da! ZEPPng!!! special contents Morita Suzuka Namida no Sotsugyō Live (Blu-ray)
- 2013.03.01 - TOKYO IDOL FESTIVAL 2012 feat. Idoling!!!
- 2013.05.24 - Idoling!!! 12th Live "Nice de Hot na Kiss shichaitai!Ryakushite NHK-ng!!!" (Blu-ray)
- 2013.09.18 - Idoling!!! Nishi e! Higashi e!! Mistery Tour-ng!!! 2013

=== Gravure DVD ===
- 2009.11.18 - Idoling!!! in Okinawa Manza Beach ~Gravure Idol no DVDtte Koko Made Yaranainjya...ng!!!~
- 2009.02.04 - Idoling!!! in Ishigakijima ~Gravure Idol no DVDppokushitemimashita ng!!!
- 2009.03.18 - Idoling!!! in Ishigakijima ~Idolppokunai uRa no Bubun mo Misechau ng!!!~
- 2009.11.18 - Idoling!!! in Okinawa Manza Beach ~Gravure Idol no DVDtte Kokomade Yaranainjya...ng!!!~
- 2010.02.17 - Idoling!!! in Okinawa Manza Beach ~Idolppokunai uRa no Bubun Made Mata Mata Misechau ng!!!~
- 2010.10.13 - Idoling!!! in Okinawa Manza Beach 2010 Gravure Idol no DVDppoidesukedo Karada wo Hatte Yattemasu ng!!!
- 2010.12.01 - Idoling!!! in Okinawa Manza Beach 2010 Natsu ~Idolppokunai uRa no Ura no Ura Made Misechau ng!!! URAHHH!~
- 2011.12.21 - Guam Idoling!!! Gravure Idol no DVDppoku Guam Battemasu Guam dake ni ng!!!
- 2012.02.24 - Guam Idoling!!! Idolppokunai uRa no Ura mo Mada Mada Guam Batte Misechau! Guam dake ni ng!!!
- 2012.11.21 - Ishigaki Idoling!!! Gravure Idol no Blu-rayppokushitemimashitang!!! Kimi to Ita Natsu (Blu-ray)
- 2013.01.16 - Ishigaki Idoling!!! 2012 Idolppokunai uRa no Ura mo Mada Mada Misechau-ng!!! (Blu-ray)
- 2013.07.26 - Idoling!!! Minami no Shima Tsuini Yume no Hawaii ni Kichaimashita-ng!!!

=== Video Collection ===
- 2009.03.18 - Idoling!!! MUSIC VIDEO COLLECTION 2007-2009 Soko Soko Tamattande Dashichaimasu ng!!!
- 2011.09.21 - Idoling!!! Music Video Collection 2 2009-2011

=== Limited Release DVD ===
- 2008.07.28 - Odaiba Bouken'ou Final Limited Edition "Idoling!!! no Natsu Yasuming!!!" ~Asa kara Hiru Hen~
- 2008.07.28 - Odaiba Bouken'ou Final Limited Edition "Idoling!!! no Natsu Yasuming!!!" ~Hiru kara Yoru Hen~
- 2009.07.27 - Odaiba Gasshuukoku Limited Edition "Idoling!!! no Natsu Yasuming!!! 2009" Part1 and Part2
- 2009.08.11 - Odaiba Gasshuukoku Limited Edition "Idoling!!! no Natsu Yasuming!!! 2009" Part3 and Part4, "Kyoufu no Jitsuwa Kaidan...Idoling Mimi Fukuro!!! Kore wa Gachi desu".
- 2010.07.17 - Odaiba Gasshuukoku Limited Edition "Idoling!!! no Natsu Yasuming!!! 2010" Part1 and Part2
- 2010.08.14 - Odaiba Gasshuukoku Limited Edition "Idoling!!! no Natsu Yasuming!!! 2010" Part3, "Maji Naki Member Zokushutsu... Idoling!!! Kimodameshing!!!" and Part4, "Kyoufu no Jitsuwa Kaidan...Idoling Mimi Fukuro!!! Kore wa Gachi desu".
- 2011.07.17 - Odaiba Gasshuukoku Limited Edition "Idoling!!! no Natsu Yasuming!!! 2011" Part1 and Part2
- 2011.08.15 - Odaiba Gasshuukoku Limited Edition "Idoling!!! no Natsu Yasuming!!! 2011" Part3, "Honki de Yarimasu... Idoling!!! Hyaku Monogatari!!! & Tokunatsu Island Basket Hen" and Part4, "Honki de Yarimasu... Idoling!!! Hyaku Monogatari!!! Sono Ni & Tokunatsu Island Mattari Talk Hen"
- 2012.07.21 - Odaiba Gasshuukoku Limited Edition "Idoling!!! no Natsu Yasuming!!! 2012" Part1 and Part2
- 2012.08.16 - Odaiba Gasshuukoku Limited Edition "Idoling!!! no Natsu Yasuming!!! 2012" Part3 and Part4

=== Blu-ray ===
- 2010.12.24 - Idoling!!! 3Dng de Blu-rayng!!!
- 2011.09.21 - Idoling!!! Music Video Collection 2 2009-2011
- 2012.07.18 - Guam Idoling!!! 3D de Tobideruyouni Guam Battemasu Guam Dakeni-ng!!!

=== DVD BOX ===
- 2008.06.27 - Idoling!!! Season1 DVD BOX (3 discs), contains episode 1–30 with extra footage
- 2008.11.28 - Idoling!!! Season2 DVD BOX (6 discs), contains episode 31–130 with extra footage
- 2009.04.15 - Idoling!!! Season3 DVD BOX (6 discs), contains episode 131–230 with extra footage
- 2009.09.02 - Idoling!!! Season4 DVD BOX (6 discs), contains episode 231–326 with extra footage
- 2010.03.17 - Idoling!!! Season5 DVD BOX (6 discs), contains episode 327–404 with extra footage
- 2010.06.16 - Idoling!!! Season6 DVD BOX (6 discs), contains episode 405–443 with extra footage
- 2010.10.29 - Idoling!!! Season7 DVD BOX (6 discs), contains episode 444–481 with extra footage
- 2010.12.15 - Idoling!!! Season8 DVD BOX (6 discs), contains episode 482–519 with extra footage
- 2011.04.27 - Idoling!!! Season9 DVD BOX (6 discs), contains episode 520–560 with extra footage
- 2011.09.21 - Idoling!!! Season10 DVD BOX (6 discs), contains episode 561–602 with extra footage
- 2012.03.07 - Idoling!!! Season11 DVD BOX (6 discs), contains episode 603–639 with extra footage
- 2012.06.29 - Idoling!!! Season12 DVD BOX (6 discs), contains episode 641–680 with extra footage
- 2012.10.17 - Idoling!!! Season13 DVD BOX (6 discs), contains episode 681–712 with extra footage
- 2013.03.20 - Idoling!!! Season14 DVD BOX (6 discs), contains episode 718–748 with extra footage
- 2013.06.28 - Idoling!!! Season15 DVD BOX (6 discs), contains episode 750–794 with extra footage

=== SD Card ===
- 2010.12.31 - Resort Idoling!!! Asobi Tsukaretashi Amai Mono Demo Tabeyo
- 2010.12.31 - Resort Idoling!!! Sekkaku Kitandashisa Umi e Ikouyo

=== Other ===
- 2010.03.24 - Yoshimoto Prince Theater Opening Kinen Live 6DAYS "Ninki Geinin vs Idol"
- 2010.03.24 - Yoshimoto Prince Theater Opening Kinen Live 6DAYS "Yoshimoto Shin Kigeki with Idol"
- 2011.07.20 - Fushigi no Kuni no Idoling!!! ~Sunda Hitomi de Itai Kara~
- 2012.04.18 - Gekidan Idoling!!! First Performance "Peron ~Tokusen Karubi 7 nin Mae wo Peron~"

== Other releases ==
=== Photobook ===
- 2008.03.14 - Idoling!!! Visual Blog "Nitsumarimasu!"
- 2008.06.04 - B.L.T Special Edition IDOLING!!! LIVE 2008 "Daiji na mono"
- 2008.12.12 - Idoling!!! in Ishigakijima
- 2008.08.28 - Idoling!!! Go Ikkou Sama
- 2010.10.01 - Idoling!!! San
- 2010.12.06 - Motto Idoling!!! Official Guide
- 2011.11.06 - Idoling!!! Four in Guam
- 2012.04.18 - Idoling!!! no Working!!!
- 2012.10.19 - Idoling!!! GO↑GO↑
- 2013.07.19 - Idoling!!! Mugyutto Hawaii

== Song Tie Ups and Collaborations ==
=== Anime ===
- Katekyo Hitman Reborn! Ending Theme Song(2007.7.7 - 2007.9.29): friend
- FAIRY TAIL Opening Theme Song(Episode 12 - 24): S.O.W. Sense Of Wonder
- FAIRY TAIL Ending Theme Song(Episode 86 - 98): Don't Think. Feel!!!

=== Games ===
- Konami Tokimeki Memorial 4 (PSP) Opening Theme Song: Te no Hira no Yuki
- Sega Puyo Puyo 7 (PSP/NDS/Wii) Image Song: Love Magic Fever
- Sony LittleBigPlanet 2 (PS3) CM Song: Yarakai Heart
- Sega Puyo Puyo!! 20th Anniversary Support Song: Koi no 20 Rensa!!
- Square-Enix "Sengoku IXA" Special Event (August 2 - September 1, 2010)
- Fuji TV & Cyber Agent "Dream Sengokuden ~Kibō no Miko~" Special Collaboration (April 18, 2011 - July 19, 2012)
- Pocelabo "Yakyutomo!" Special Collaboration (October 15 - November 4, 2010)
- Kurohyō 2: Ryū ga Gotoku Ashura-hen in-game characters (#3 Endō, #6 Tonooka, #19 Tachibana)
- Collaboration with MMORPG "Trickster"
- Collaboration with mobile mahjong game "Jyannabi Yonin Mahjong Online"
- GREE "IDOL☆J@M"
- NEC BIGLOBE "Yome Collection Idol" (February 21, 2013 – present)

=== TV Show ===
- Fuji TV "Kiseki Taiken! Unbelievable" Ending Theme Song(2009.4 - 7): baby blue
- Fuji TV "Raion no Gokigenyo" Ending Theme Song(2009.6.29 -): Mujouken Koufuku
- Fuji TV "Kiseki Taiken! Unbelievable" Ending Theme Song(2010.1 - 3): Don't be afraid
- Fuji TV "Kiseki Taiken! Unbelievable" Ending Theme Song(2011.1 - 3): Queen Bee ~Shoujo no Jidai Kara~
- CBC "Otakara Hasshin Tower DAI-NAMO" Ending Theme Song: Konayuki ga Mau Machinami de
- Fuji TV "Kiseki Taiken! Unbelievable" Ending Theme Song(2012.1 - 3): MAMORE!!!
- TBS Hanamaru Market Ending Theme Song(2012.1 - 3): Sara Sara Kyutiko
- TV Asahi "music-ru TV" Opening Theme Song (2013.11): Shout!!!
- NST "Smile Stadium" Ending Theme Song (2013.12): Shout!!!

=== Movie ===
- Pyokotan Profile Ending Theme Song: Lemon Drop

=== Event ===
- HOT☆FANTASY ODAIBA 2007-2008 Image song: Snow celebration
- ROBO_JAPAN 2008 Image Song: Tokimeki Dreaming!!!
- HOT☆FANTASY ODAIBA 2008-2009 Image Song: Hannin wa Anata Desu, NAGARA
- Idol Championship "Push★1" Image Song: Beta na Shitsuren ~Shibuya ni Furu Yuki~, Harukanaru Virgin Road
- Fuji TV Winter Festival 2013: Samui Yoru Dakara...

=== Software ===
- Microsoft Windows Vista "Vista Gakuen" Campaign Song: Kokuhaku

=== TV Commercial ===
- Ryū ga Gotoku OF THE END local TV commercial
- Marudai Shokuhin "Ganbare! Nippon!" Campaign Song(April 1 - May 31, 2012): Megami no Pulse
- P&G "Febreze"(2013)
- Glico "Caplico" (2013)

=== Other Collaborations ===
- Collaboration with Sony VAIO
- Collaboration with Microsoft Digital Quiz on Koto no Pa!
- Collaboration with Yahoo!Japan "Net Bandzuke 2010"
- Collaboration with Flash Animation "Naked Wolves"
- Collaboration with Hewlett-Packard Japan
- Tokyo Polytechnic University Future Exhibition 2009 Special Supporter
- Ōiso Prince Hotel, Ōiso Long Beach 55th Anniversary Campaign Girl
- Collaboration with WACOM "Tenohira Animal Land" (July 4 - August 6, 2012)
- Collaboration with fashion brand VANQUISH for Idoling!!! 12th Live Limited Edition T-shirt (October 26 - November 25, 2012)
- Collaboration with Glico Giant Caplico "Caplico Queen Ketteisen" (October 27 - December 9, 2012)
- Collaboration with Cedyna, Cedyna Card (June 27, 2013 – present)

== Live and Event Participation ==
=== Numbering Lives ===
| No. | Title | Date | Venue | Note |
|---|---|---|---|---|
| 1 | 1st Live Motto Ganbare Otome(Warai) (1stライブ「もっとガンバレ乙女（笑）」) | December 15, 2007 | Shinagawa Stellar Ball | |
| 2 | 2nd Live Daiji na Mono (2ndライブ「だいじなもの」) | March 30, 2008 | SHIBUYA-AX | |
| 2 | 2nd Live Daiji na Mono (2ndライブ「だいじなもの」) | April 4, 2008 | Osaka BIG CAT | |
| 3 | 3rd Live Idoling!!! Live 2008 Summer Kimerunara Kono Natsu-ssung!!! (3rdライブ「アイドリング!!!ライブ 2008サマー 決めるならこの夏っスング!!!」) | July 5, 2008 | Zepp Tokyo | |
| 4 | 4th Live Nani ka ga Okoru Yokan ga...ng!!! (4thライブ「何かが起こる予感が...ング!!!」) | January 18, 2009 | Nakano Sun Plaza | #2 Rumi Koizumi announced her graduation. |
| 5 | 5th Live Idoling!!! Sotsugyō Live Aratanaru Tabidachi-ng!!! (5thライブ「アイドリング!!!卒業ライブ 新なる旅立ちング!!!」) | March 18, 2009 | Shibuya C.C. Lemon Hall | #1 Sayaka Kato, #4 Maria Eto, #5 Mira Takiguchi, #18 Michelle Miki graduation live. |
| 6 | 6th Live Ya!O!!ng!!! (6thライブ「やーっ!おーっ!!ング!!!」) | September 22, 2009 | Hibiya Open-Air Concert Hall | Live band was introduced, Idoling!!! band performance was introduced. |
| 6 | 6th Live Ya!O!!ng!!! (6thライブ「やーっ!おーっ!!ング!!!」) | September 23, 2009 | Hibiya Open-Air Concert Hall | Live band was introduced, Idoling!!! band performance was introduced. |
| 7 | 7th Live Jinsei wa Shugyōnari-ng!!! (7thライブ「人生$=$修行ナリング!!!」) | January 24, 2010 | Tokyo Kōsei Nenkin Kaikan | 4th generation audition's last 15 participants were introduced. |
| 8 | 8th Live Kono Kimochi wa Sō da! Are da! Koi nandeshō-ng!!! (8thライブ「この気持ちは そうだ あれだ 恋なんでしょうング!!!」) | May 3, 2010 | Shibuya C.C. Lemon Hall | #7 Erika Yazawa injured her neck during the rehearsal. She was wearing a neck brace throughout the live as an MC and could only participate for a few songs. |
| 9 | 9th Live Bonnou no Kazu dake Ai ga aru! Oshōgatsu eve-ng!!! (9thライブ「ボンノウの数だけ愛がある!お正月eveング!!!」) | December 31, 2010 | Nakano Sun Plaza | Adult members also held a Countdown Live. |
| 10 | 10th Live Kangaeruna. Kanjiro! GO AHEAD-ng!!! (10thライブ「かんがえるな。感じろ! GO AHEADング!!!」) | June 26, 2011 | Nakano Sun Plaza | Idoling!!! dance performance was introduced. |
| 11 | 11th Live Meccha Chikazo! Big Egg-ng!!! (11thライブ「めっちゃ近いぞ! ビッグエッグング!!!」) | December 4, 2011 | Tokyo Dome City Hall | 5th generation audition finalist were introduced. |
| 12 | 12th Live Nice de Hot na Kiss shichaitai! Ryakushite NHK-ng!!! (12thライブ「NiceでHotなKissしちゃいたい! 略してNHKング!!!」) | November 25, 2012 | NHK Hall | Fans were encouraged to record the new song's live performance using smartphone and upload it to video hosting sites. |
| 13 | 13th Live Shijou Saidai! 25-nin no Daisakusen-ng!!! Hare, Tokidoki GOD (13thライブ「史上最大！25人の大作戦グ!!! 晴れ、時々神」) | December 8, 2013 | Nakano Sun Plaza | The group's leader, Mai Endō (#3), announced her graduation. |

=== Fixed-term Lives ===
- Hachitama Live (April 2009 - March 2010)

Hachitama live was held once a month at Fuji TV Kyutai Studio, a studio inside the spherical structure on top of Fuji TV's headquarter in Odaiba, Tokyo. Special live was held twice outside the Kyutai Studio.

- Hachitama Live SP Idoling!!! in Oiso Long Beach, was held in Oiso Long Beach resort in Kanagawa Prefecture.
- Idoling!!! 4th Generation Final Audition, was held in Yoshimoto Prince Theater.

- Shinahachi Live (April 2010 - November 2011)

Shinahachi Live was held several times a month at Yoshimoto Prince Theater in Shinagawa, Tokyo. It is a joint-live with Yoshimoto's idol group YGA. Special live was held three times at Namba Grand Kagetsu (NGK) in Osaka.

- Jukuhachi Live (December 2011 - July 2012)

Jukuhachi Live was held once a month at Lumine the Yoshimoto in Shinjuku, Tokyo. It is the continuation of the joint-live with YGA which was moved from Yoshimoto Prince Theater due to the closing down of the property. Special live was held once at Namba Grand Kagetsu in Osaka.

- Shibuhachi Live (September 2012 – present)

Shibuhachi Live is held several times a month at Mt. Rainier Hall Shibuya Pleasure Pleasure in Shibuya, Tokyo. The "Namagoe live" performance, a live singing without microphone, was introduced in this live as one of the main attractions.

- Nicohachi Live (November 2011 – present)

Nicohachi Live is held twice a month at Nicofarre in Roppongi, Tokyo. The live is divided in two sessions in one day performance, from 18:30 - 21:30 local time. The live is broadcast on Niconico namahousou for 1,600 niconico point for both sessions. Viewer will have the right to watch the backstage live broadcast in between the sessions. The "Nicohachi enquête" was introduced in this live, where viewer can do a live vote for related questionnaire, usually "which song to be performed next" or "which member to perform the next song". Viewer can also do a live comment during the live, and all comments will be shown up on the screen at the stage, Nicofarre, which features LED wall surrounding the stage.

=== Events ===
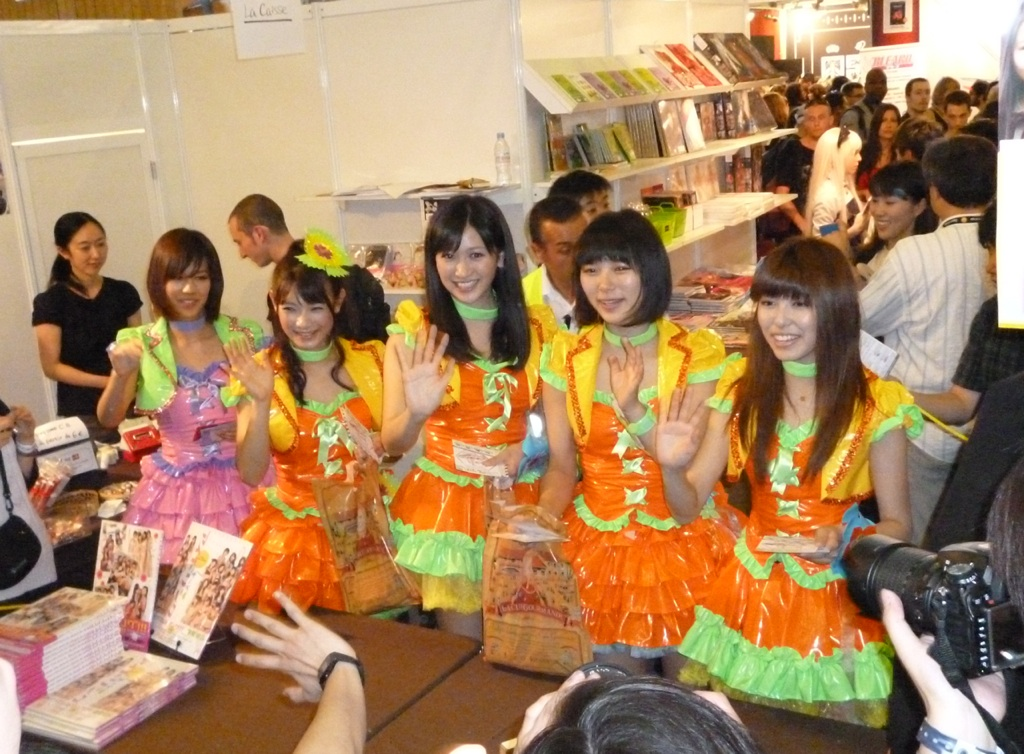
Idoling!!! Handshake session at Japan Expo 2012

- TOKYO IDOL FESTIVAL 2010 (2010.08.07-08)
- Tokyo Earth Ride 2010 (2010.10.11)
- TOKYO EARTH WORKERS collection 2011 (2011.01.23)
- TOKYO IDOL FESTIVAL 2011 (2011.08.27-28)
- EKIDEN for PEACE 2011 (2011.10.02) - Live performance and relay race.
- TOKYO EARTH WORKERS collection 2012 (2012.02.12)
- EXIT TUNES ACADEMY -EXIT TUNES 10th ANNIVERSARY SPECIAL- in Saitama Super Arena (2012.05.06) - Opening act.
- Yubi Matsuri ~Idol Rinji Soukai~ in Nippon Budokan produced by HKT48 Rino Sashihara (2012.06.25)
- Japan Expo 2012 (2012.07.07) - Live performance and handshake event.
- TOKYO IDOL FESTIVAL 2012 (2012.08.04-05)
- a-nation musicweek IDOL NATION in Yoyogi National Gymnasium (2012.08.11)
- Inazuma Rock Fes. 2012 (2012.09.15) - Live performance at the free area only
- TOKYO IDOL FESTIVAL 2013 (2013.07.27-28)
- a-nation IDOL NATION 2013 (2013.08.10)
- a-nation stadium fest. 2013 (2013.08.31) - Opening act
- Koyabu Sonic 2013 (2013.09.15)

== Awards ==
1. Lohas Design Award 2010 Special Prize for "Eco Idoling!!!"
2. Lohas Design Award 2011 Special Prize for Social game "Dream Sengokuden ~Kibō no Miko~"

== Subgroups ==
=== 2008/12 — 2009/01 ===
| Group | Furi Furi Idoling!!! | Giza Giza Idoling!!! | Kyun Kyun Idoling!!! | Ban Ban Idoling!!! |
| Single | "Hannin wa Anata Desu" | "Nagara"^{1} | "Beta na Shitsuren (Shibuya ni Furu Yuki)" | "Haruka Naru Virgin Road" |
| Members | Endō (#3); Yokoyama (#9); Morita (#11); Sakai (#14) | Koizumi (#2); Phongchi (#8); Miyake (#17); Miki (#18) | Tonooka (#6); Yazawa (#7); Kawamura (#12); Asahi (#15) | Katō (#1); Eto (#4); Takiguchi (#5); Nagano (#13); Kikuchi (#16) |

^{1} The missing heart in the Hannin wa Anata Desu PV can be seen in the PV for Na•Ga•Ra

=== 2009/12 ===
| Group | Tokimeki Idoling!!! | Puyo Puyo Idoling!!! |
| Single | "Te no Hira no Yūki" | "Love Magic Fever" |
| Group | Endō (#3); Tonooka (#6); Yokoyama (#9); Morita (#11)^{1} Miyake (#17); Tachibana (#19); Ōkawa (#20) | Yazawa (#7); Phongchi (#8); Kawamura (#12); Nagano (#13); Sakai (#14); Asahi (#15); Kikuchi (#16); Hashimoto (#21) |

^{1} Morita did not appear in the PV.

=== 2010/11 ===
In the fall of 2010, the 20 members were divided into pairs to form 10 groups. Fans then voted on which duo would perform their own track on the next single. Team Gakuran was the winner and performed the track "Ichikoi" on the Yarakai Heart single.

| Team | Hitorikko | OGI | BOX | Docchi Ienen | Oozumou | Gakuran | Touzai Ryuu Yokozuna | HaTaChi | Ojousama | Sainenshou |
| Members | Endō (#3); Tachibana (#19) | Yokoyama (#9); Kawamura (#12) | Tonooka (#6); Nagano (#13) | Morita (#11); Nomoto (#24) | Ōkawa (#20); Ojima (#26) | Asahi (#15); Gotō (#25) | Phongchi (#8); Sakai (#14) | Yazawa (#7); Kikuchi (#16) | Miyake (#17); Itō (#23) | Hashimoto (#21); Kurata (#22) |

In Summer 2010, a song "Makehende" was introduced at Shinahachi Live in NGK. The song was originally written only for this event but due to demand from fans, the song then applied to USEN Music Program. The song entered USEN ranking top 50 and decided to be included in Idoling!!! 4th album "SISTERS" released in 2011 . A music video then created after the song managed to enter top 30.

| Team | Kansai Idoling!!! |
| Members | Morita (#11); Tachibana (#19); Ōkawa (#20); Kurata (#22); Nomoto (#24) |

== Idoling!!! Programs ==
Idoling!!! TV show is airing in three different medias; the CS, the On Demand, and the Terrestrial broadcast. Each has different packaging.

=== Fuji TV CS ===
The Idoling!!! program started on October 30, 2006, airing every weekday on two Fuji TV's satellite channels, Fuji TV 739 (also formerly on Fuji TV 721) and Fuji TV CSHD. On this version, the TV show is unedited. Since 2009, the show is airing two and three times per week. Since the show is unedited, mistakes and happenings can be seen sometimes throughout the show, for example was episode 459. The show is a variety show, making each airing different. However, there are a few recurring core segments.

| Mani Idol!!! | This segment is Idoling!!!'s miscellaneous segment. Anything from racing Mini Yonku (Mini 4WD) to learning how to finger-whistle is dealt with in this segment. |
| Ganbaringu!!! | This segment is Idoling!!!'s miscellaneous physical activity / sport segment. Past challenges included having all the members jump rope simultaneously, dribble basketballs through an obstacle course of supine staff members and participate in badminton games where the position of the fallen shuttlecock determines a specific punishment. |
| Iisō Shiritori!!! | The members sit in a semicircle and play a game of Shiritori. The challenge lies in the rule that the contribution must be a sentence that would be said by something specific (a school-teacher, a nurse, a lottery winner, etc.). A new sentence must start with the same syllable as the previous one ended. If they stutter, reuse a line or end their sentence with an nn /ん sound, they are disqualified and held still while a staff member in a white unitard blasts them in the face with a leaf-blower. |
| Fan-sama Request!!! | Fans submit a specific phrase or sentence online that they want the members to say. One by one, the members stand behind a device with a rising panel and deliver their lines as appropriately or as cutely as they can. A winner is chosen once everyone has had their turn. |

Other segments
These segments are fairly new or do not appear as frequently as the above. Segments will often gain temporary popularity with the staff and fans, resulting in recurring airings for a short period, followed by a period where the once-popular segment does not air at all.

| Zenin Seikai Itadakimasu Quiz!!! | The members are presented with some type of food or dessert and must identify it. All members must have written the correct name to permit anyone to enjoy the food. If even a single member does not answer correctly, the entire group must drink a bitter tea concoction. |
| Eigo de GO! GO! GO!!! | Hashimoto, Asahi and Morita (named Nancy, George and Pinky for this segment) are suspected to have the worst grasp of English in the entire group. In this segment, they attempt to translate well-known Japanese phrases to the rest of the members. The members then do their best to decipher the phrase through the mangled English. |
| Baka-Rizumu wa Dare Da? | "Who is Baka-Rhythm?" In this segment, four members are chosen at a time to sit separate from the group. They all don an earpiece with the catch being that only a single headphone broadcasts a live-feed from Masuno, who sits in a vocal-booth off stage. Masuno commands the affected member to write or act-out various things. Once finished, the watching members must wager a guess at which participant was acting through Masuno's instruction. |

=== Fuji TV On Demand ===
Fuji TV On Demand is a paid streaming service. The On Demand duration of each episode depends on the filming, sometimes it can be 40 minutes long with the first 27 minutes the same as broadcast on the CS version. On Demand currently streams in MP4 format (1280x720 pixels, 2000 kbit/s bitrate).

=== Fuji TV Terrestrial ===
The terrestrial channel is known as Fuji TV main channel(CX), which is free but only available around Tokyo. The show known as Chijōha-han (地上波版), formerly Idoling!!! Nikki (アイドリング!!!日記). Idoling!!! show in this broadcast is edited to fit the 30 minutes slot with commercials, sometimes cramped two CS episodes into one. The edit includes narration, additional captions, and extra segment which is not available on other broadcasts. One of those segments is ARG started on December 29, 2012.

=== uRaIdoling!!! ===
uRaIdoling is a special collection of Idoling episodes available only to fanclub members. These episodes feature a behind-the-scenes look at the various activities of the members (and occasionally the staff) when they are not filming the main show. These episodes are not constrained to any format and cover topics and subjects with no specificity. Some examples of episodes include visiting member's houses, cooking with members, games or discussions between small groups of members, solo interviews, photo-shoot documentaries, and PV "making of" documentaries.

=== Gekkan Idoling!!! ===
Gekkan Idoling can be considered Idoling's monthly specials. These episodes feature off-location activities such as cooking lessons, camping trips, games. They are similar to uRaIdoling in their miscellaneousness, though they are longer in length and feature most, if not all, members. The full episodes were later released in a longer format on DVD for fan club members. After a year, Gekkan Idoling!!! became a direct-to-DVD production without TV broadcast.

=== Idoling!!! YouTube Channel ===
Since April 17, 2012, Idoling!!! started its official YouTube channel. Other than streaming old collections of TV show episode and Gekkan Idoling!!!, it also streams 2–3 minutes video called "Daily Idoling!!!" (日刊アイドリング!!!, Nikkan Idoling!!!) every weekday, and 10 minutes video called "Weekly Idoling!!!" (週刊アイドリング!!!, Shūkan Idoling!!!) every week. Daily Idoling!!! features member(s) daily activity, free talk, event report, etc. Weekly Idoling!!! features member(s) doing some challenge segment, field report, promotion video making-of, etc.

=== Related People ===
==== MC ====
- Bakarhythm (Hidetomo Masuno) (2006—present)

==== Fuji TV Announcer ====
- Sayaka Morimoto (2006—present)
- Maiko Saito (2006—present)
- Saori Ishimoto (2006—2007)
- Yōko Shōno (2007—2009)
- Reiko Endō (2008—2009)
- Sara Hosogai (2010—2011)
- Yurika Mita (2011)

==== TV Staff ====
- Takeshi Shimada (Chief Director)
- Yosuke Mori (Director)
- Seita Kadosawa (General Producer and Director, also the group's producer)(~2013)
- Shun'ya Hamada (Producer) (~2013)
