= Hitomi Miyake =

Japanese idol and talent from Tokyo (born 1992)

- 三宅 ひとみ
- Born: July 10, 1992 (age 34); Tokyo, Japan
- Height: 1.56 m (5 ft 1 1/2 in) (2008)

Hitomi Miyake (三宅 ひとみ, Miyake Hitomi; born July 10, 1992) is a former Japanese idol and talent from Tokyo. She is formerly represented by Biscuit Entertainment, and is a second generation member of the Japanese idol group Idoling!!!.

== Filmography ==
=== Movies ===
- Maria-sama ga Miteru (2010) as Yoshino Shimazu

=== TV dramas ===
- Great Teacher Onizuka (2012) as Megumi Asakura (Fuji TV)
- Ryomaden (2010) as Sato (NHK)

=== Anime ===
- Code Geass (2006) as Miya I. Hillmick
