= Phongchi =

Vietnamese-Japanese idol singer

Phuong Chi Fonchi フォンチー
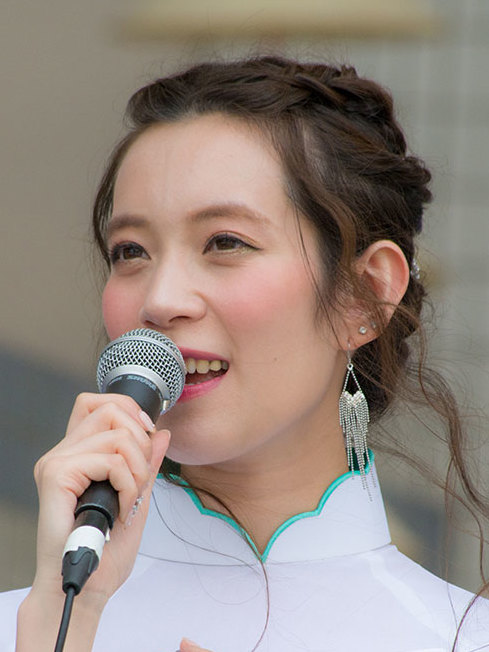
- Born: December 16, 1990 (age 35); Hiratsuka, Kanagawa, Japan
- Occupations: Idol; Gravure idol; Tarento; Actor; Singer
- Modeling information
- Agency: Sony Music Artists

Phongchi (フォンチー, Fonchī; born December 16, 1990) is a Japanese idol of Vietnamese descent. Often dubbed "Idoling No. 8", she is a former member of Japanese all-girl idol group Idoling. She was one of original members and had been the most popular member of the group. She also does glamour modeling as a gravure idol, having released two photobooks and five DVDs since 2008.

== Career ==
Phongchi was born in 1990 in Hiratsuka, Kanagawa to Vietnamese immigrant parents who came from Saigon, South Vietnam. Phongchi participated in an audition, the SMA Teens Audition, held by Sony Music Artists in 2005, becoming the runner up. She joined Idoling as an original member in 2006.

She began to be known as the "protégé" of Sayuri Kokusho, a seasoned actress known formerly as "Onyanko No. 8", and began appearing on numerous non-Idoling television shows in late 2007. She released her first photobook titled Fon Fonchi in September 2008 and first DVD titled Cam On : Precious Time in October 2008.

Her second DVD A Letter From a Teen was shot in Okinawa and released in September 2009. Her second photobook Ritual Heart was shot in Bali and released in March 2010. Her third DVD F : Angel's Wing was also shot in Bali and released in March 2010, and fourth DVD if : My Little Sister was released in November 2010.

In September 2010 she made her first Vietnam-related appearance at the annual Vietnam Festival event took place at the Yoyogi Park in Shibuya, Tokyo. She appeared in the event as its main host, along with several guests from Vietnam including famous Vietnamese artists as Ho Quynh Huong and Nam Cuong. Again, she worked as the host for the Vietnam Festival 2011 (September 17–18) where the guests again include Ho Quynh Huong.

Phongchi graduated from Idoling in December 2011 to start a career in acting, alongside "Idoling No. 7" Erika Yazawa who would later become a comedian. She released her fifth DVD Kaleidoscope in January 2012. It was her first DVD after leaving Idoling, where she dressed in costumes such as those inspired by Rihanna.

== Weight-loss obsession ==
Phongchi always talks about her weight and weight-loss plan whenever she is interviewed. She was a member of Idoling's Pocchari Dohmei ("Axis of Chubby"), a team consisting of the three heaviest members in the group, along with Erika Yazawa and Erika Tonooka. She has weighed up to 48 kg (105 lb) at 1.65m (5 ft 5 in), and she has stated that she considers herself overweight and has always been dieting. She said about it, "I can't announce my weight until I have a decent weight". She has stated that she has idolized the actress Risa Goto and especially the famous model Emi Suzuki, whose BMIs have been reported to be less than 14.

She has revealed that she has a strong addiction to Caramel Frappuccino, a Starbucks beverage which often appears on her blog. There are about 247 kcal in one Caramel Frappuccino bottle and she drinks it twice a day. This can be one reason why she struggles so much with her weight, but she has stated that she could not live without it.

== Personal life ==
Aside from her native Japanese, Phongchi is also fluent in Vietnamese. Her first DVD Cam On featured her conversations with native Vietnamese-speaking children.

She is known as a hardcore gamer, more specifically, a hardcore PS3 player. One time she played Demon's Souls in her room for about 20 hours straight, skipping an appearance on the Idoling show. She is also a wrestling fan, specifically a Dragon Gate fan and has several wrestling game titles.

As for fashion, in her personal life, she did not show any preference in the 2000s, but since around 2010 when she turned 20 she has shown a strong preference for the Ageha style which does not fit her vibrant "idol" image.

On August 8, 2022, she announced her marriage and pregnancy of her first child.

== Releases ==
=== Photobooks ===
- Fon Fon Chi, September 5, 2008
- Ritual Heart, March 12, 2010

=== DVDs ===
- Cam on, October 22, 2008
- 10-dai Kara no Tegami (A Letter from a Teen), September 30, 2009
- F : Angel's Wing, March 19, 2010
- if : Boku no Imoto (if : My Little Sister), November 27, 2010
- Kaleidoscope, January 25, 2012

== Filmography ==
=== Film ===
- Tokyo MER: Mobile Emergency Room – The Movie (2023), Hoang Lan Minh
- Tokyo MER: Mobile Emergency Room – Nankai Mission (2025), Hoang Lan Minh
- Tokyo MER: Mobile Emergency Room – Capital Crisis (2026), Hoang Lan Minh

=== Television ===
- MIU404 (Ep. 5) (2020)
- Tokyo MER: Mobile Emergency Room (2021), Hoang Lan Minh
