= Erica Tonooka =

Japanese idol singer and actress

- 外岡 えりか
- Born: June 11, 1991 (age 35); Kanagawa Prefecture, Japan
- Occupation: Actress
- Years active: 2006–present
- Height: 1.57 m (5 ft 2 in)

Erica Tonooka (外岡 えりか, Tonooka Erika; born June 11, 1991) is a Japanese actress and a member of the Japanese idol group Idoling!!!. While the pronunciation is the same, her former professional name used to be written as 外岡 枝里香. She is a graduate of Hosei University.

== Filmography ==
=== Movies ===
- Abashiri Ikka The Movie (2009), as Kikunosuke Abashiri
- Re:Play-Girls (2010), as Michi
- Koneko no Kimochi (2011), as Myu

=== Dramas ===
- Tetsudou Musume (2008-2009)
- Asu no Hikari o Tsukame (2010), as Ayame Mizushima
- Marumo no Okite (2011), as Rinka Ozaki
- Asu no Hikari o Tsukame 2 (2011), as Ayame Mizushima
- Koi Nante Zeitaku ga Watashi ni Ochitekuru no darou ka? (2012) Fuji TV Two
- Kurohyo 2 Ryu ga Gotoku Asura-hen (2012) MBS, as Erika

=== TV shows ===
- Idoling!!! (2006–2015) Fuji TV
- Ressha Sentai ToQger (2014), as Sakura Igawa (guest role)

=== Image video ===
- Hajimari (May 2, 2008)
- Refreshing (September 30, 2008)
- Tono Tono Smile (February 18, 2009)
- Bathroom kara Ai o Komete (April 7, 2010)

=== TV commercials ===
- ARAX Group (2006-2007) Chiba TV
- Agura Bokujo (2007-?)
- McDonald (2007-2009)
- SMBC Consumer Finance Promise (2012–?)
- Honda Cars (2014-?)

== Bibliography ==
=== Photobooks ===
- Himawari (November 22, 2007) ISBN 978-4776204756
- I am Seventeen (July 17, 2009) ISBN 978-4902307078
