= Erika Yazawa =

Japanese gravure idol (born 1990)

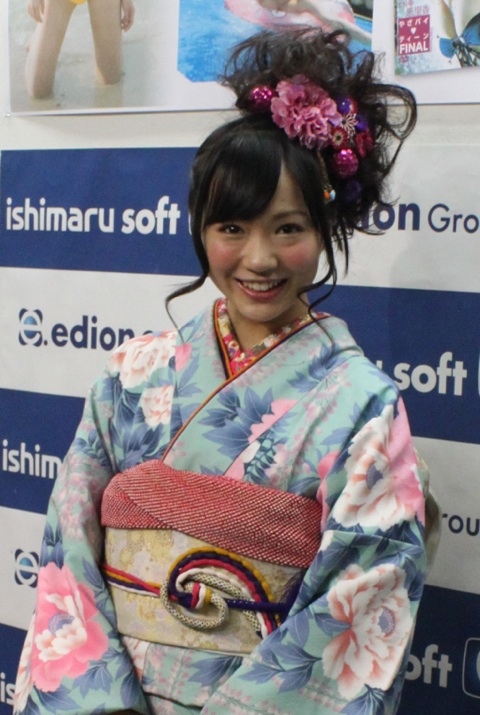
- Born: November 15, 1990 (age 35); Tokyo prefecture, Japan
- Height: 1.50 m (4 ft 11 in)

Erika Yazawa (谷澤恵里香, Yazawa Erika; born November 15, 1990) is a Japanese gravure idol. She is from Tokyo, and was a first year member (#7) of the idol group Idoling!!!. On December 11, 2011 it was announced that she would graduate from Idoling!!! on December 31 together with Fonchi (#8). Her nickname is 'Yaza-pai'.

== Bibliography ==
=== Photographs ===
- Eri Color (2007)
- No. 7 Second Yazawaa (2008)
- Yazawa no kaidan no boru (2010)

== Filmography ==
=== Dramas ===
==== TV shows ====
- Idoling!!! - Idoling #7 (2006-2011)
- Kudamaki Hachibee X - (2011-)

==== TV Dramas ====
- Tetsudou Musume - Kawaguchi Misono (2008)
- The Ancient Dogoo Girl - Role of Dogu-chan, the female lead character
- Kamen Rider W - Ai Nijimura (2010)
- Ancient Girl Squad Dogoon 5 - Role of Dogu-chan (2010)

=== Image Videos ===
- Eri color, 2007
- Pure Smile, Yazawa Erika, 2007
- Sumimasen, Yazawa Erika kudasai, 2008
- Yazapai School, 2009
- Yazapai Tension, 2009
- Yazapai Standard, 2010
- Yazapai Teen FINAL, 2010
- Yazapai Memorial~Married, no!? , 2011
