= Ami Kikuchi =

Japanese singer and radio personality

- 菊地 亜美
- Born: September 5, 1990 (age 35); Kitami, Hokkaido, Japan
- Other name: Amimi
- Occupations: Tarento; model; radio personality
- Years active: 2006–present
- Agent: LesPros Entertainment
- Height: 1.64 m (5 ft 4 1/2 in)
- Spouse: Unknown (m. 2018)
- Children: 2

Ami Kikuchi (菊地 亜美, Kikuchi Ami; born September 5, 1990) is a Japanese model, tarento and radio personality from LesPros Entertainment. She is from Kitami, Hokkaido, and is a second generation member (number 16) of the idol group Idoling.

Since her graduation from Idoling, Kikuchi has made numerous appearances as a television personality on various variety programs.

== Personal life ==
On February 1, 2018, Kikuchi announced her marriage to a non-celebrity man. She gave birth to her first child, a daughter, on August 24, 2020. In October 2024, she announced through her instagram that she is expecting the couples second child. Kikuchi later gave birth to her second daughter on March 13, 2025.

== Filmography ==
=== TV Shows (Regular) ===
- Idoling!!! - Idoling #16 (April 2008) Fuji TV
- News!371~Idol (April 2009- March 2010) Enta!371
- Shouri no Megami 5 (January 2010) Chiba TV
- Sweet Den of Premiere - (October 2011) Fuji TV

==== Radio shows ====
- Kikuchi Ami no 1ami9 (October 2009) Radio Nippon

=== Image Videos ===
- Angel Kiss ~Smile Paradise~ (2008)
- Angel Kiss ~Amimi no Smile Party~ (2009）
- Kikuchi Ami desu!!! (2009）
- ami4you ~Kikuchi janai-yo, Kukuchi dayo. (2010）
- Magical☆Switch (2010）

=== Film ===
- Everything Will Be Owlright! (2022)

== Bibliography ==
=== Photographs ===
- Ami-ing (March 2012)

=== Trading Cards ===
- Amimirakuru (January 2010)
