= Ai Okawa =

Japanese idol singer and model

- 大川藍
- Born: July 17, 1993 (age 33); Amagasaki, Hyogo, Japan
- Occupations: Fashion model and actress

Ai Okawa (大川藍, Ōkawa Ai), born July 17, 1993) is a Japanese idol, fashion model, actress and a former member of female idol group Idoling!!!.

== Life and career ==
Ai Okawa was born on July 17, 1993, in Amagasaki, Hyogo, Japan. She is the youngest of three children; she has two older brothers. Okawa joined idoling!!! as a third-generation member in 2009 and quickly established herself as one of the most popular members of Idoling!!!. She is known as an active participant of sports event within the group, especially sumo and badminton tournament. In 2012, she made her modeling debut for an influential Japanese fashion magazine JJ. She has walked the runway at Tokyo Girls Collection, Kobe Collection, Kansai Collection, Tokyo Runway and Girls Award. In April 2015, Okawa became the Saturday weather presenter for "Going! Sports & News" on Nippon Television Network.
