= Nao Asahi =

Japanese tarento, actress, idol, and model

- 朝日 奈央
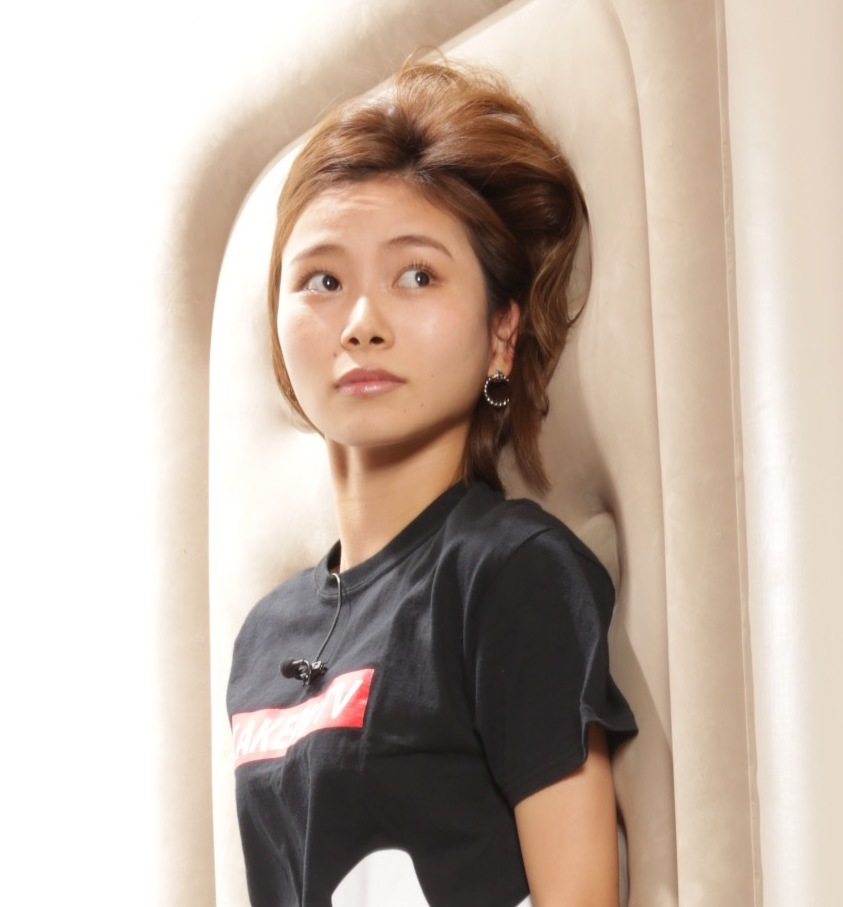
- Born: April 21, 1994 (age 32); Saitama Prefecture, Japan
- Other names: Asahi (あさひ☆); Nao (なお); Naorin (なおりん)
- Occupations: Tarento, actress, idol, model
- Years active: 2007–present
- Agent: Rising Production
- Height: 1.64 m (5 ft 5 in) (2016)
- Website: Official profile

Nao Asahi (朝日 奈央, Asahi Nao; born 21 April 1994, in Saitama Prefecture, Japan) is a Japanese tarento, actress, idol, and former fashion model. She is represented with Rising Production.

Asahi is a member of the idol group Maintenance. She was a former member of the idol group Idoling!!! Asahi also appears regularly on television variety programs.

== Filmography ==
=== TV series ===
Regular appearances

Year	Title	Network
2008	Idoling!!!	Fuji TV One Two Next
2008	Idoling!!! Nikki	Fuji TV

=== TV dramas ===
Year	Title	Network	Notes
2010	Kaibutsu-kun	NTV	Episode 2
2013	Limit	TV Tokyo	Episode 1

=== Anime ===
Year	Title	Role	Network
2013	Gatchaman Crowds	Hinata Yamamura, girlfriend, bus passenger	NTV

=== Internet series ===
Year	Title	Network	Notes
2013	Daimao Kosaku no Katsuake!	AmebaStudio	Assistant MC
2013	Nao Asahi Premium Hōsō	AmebaStudio	
2013	Joshi Collective	2.5D	
2014	Nao Asahina no Pop Step Asahi Kōkai-sei Meeting	2.5D	

=== Internet drama ===
Year	Title	Role	Network	Notes
2011	Secret girls	Miki Morikawa	Fuji TV Misanga	Lead role
	Cupit Club	Vision Cast		

=== Films ===
Year	Title	Role	Notes	Ref.
2009	Keroro Gunso the Super Movie 4: Gekishin Dragon Warriors	Tourist (voice)		
2023	Yudo: The Way of the Bath			
2023	Fly Me to the Saitama: From Biwa Lake with Love	Ino Wakatsuki		

=== Stage ===
Year	Title	Role	Notes	Ref.
2016	100-ten un Choice! Hapipura!	Saki Tsuruoka	Lead role	
2016	100-ten un Choice! Darekaga Kanojo ga Shitte Iru			

=== Advertisements ===
Year	Title
2009	Lovetoxic
2012	Fashion Center Shimamura
	Ezaki Glico Ebidabe! Deco Pocky
2016	Keisuke Yoshida 16SS

=== Magazines ===
Year	Title	Notes	Ref.
2007	Love Berry	Exclusive model	
2012	Weekly ASCII	Cover	

=== Delivery applications ===
Year	Title	Network
2015	Nao Asahi Official Namahōsō	Ameba Fresh! Studio

=== Events ===
Year	Title
2015	Hamura Nigiwai Ongaku-sai 2015
2016	Hamura Natsu Matsuri: LiFriends Live

== As a member of Maintenance ==
=== Internet series ===
Year	Title	Network
2015	Hamaguchi Comte Circle –Kikaku-hen−: Snack Umeko Special	Showroom
2016	Tokyo Idol Festival 2016: Snack Umeko Night	
2016	Tokyo Idol Festival 2016: After Snack Umeko	Niconico Live

=== Events ===
Year	Title	Ref.
2015	Hamaguchi Comte Circle –Kikaku-hen−: Snack Umeko Special	
2016	Tokyo Idol Festival 2016	
