= Superstar (Madonna song) =

Promotional single by Madonna

from the album MDNA
- Released: December 3, 2012
- Recorded: 2011
- Studio: MSR Studios, New York City
- Genre: Dance-pop
- Length: 3:55
- Label: Interscope
- Songwriters: Madonna; Hardy "Indigo" Muanza; Michael Malih
- Producers: Madonna; Muanza; Malih

MDNA track listing
- 16 tracks: 1. "Girl Gone Wild"; 2. "Gang Bang"; 3. "I'm Addicted"; 4. "Turn Up the Radio"; 5. "Give Me All Your Luvin'"; 6. "Some Girls"; 7. "Superstar"; 8. "I Don't Give A"; 9. "I'm a Sinner"; 10. "Love Spent"; 11. "Masterpiece"; 12. "Falling Free"; Deluxe edition: 13. "Beautiful Killer"; 14. "I Fucked Up"; 15. "B-Day Song"; 16. "Best Friend"

"Superstar" is a song by American singer-songwriter Madonna from her twelfth studio album MDNA (2012). It was released on December 3, 2012, in Brazil only as a special edition free CD with Brazilian newspaper Folha de S.Paulo. The song was written and produced by Madonna, Hardy "Indigo" Muanza and Michael Malih and is a dance-pop track, which has electronic and pop influences. Instrumentation featured in "Superstar" includes guitars and drum machines. Lyrically, Madonna compares her boyfriend with famous men, such as John Travolta, Abraham Lincoln, Al Capone, among others and claims to be his "biggest fan".

The accompanying artwork for the single was created by Brazilian graffiti artist Simone Sapienza, who won a contest sponsored by Johnnie Walker's Keep Walking Project in Brazil. She was chosen by Madonna from ten finalists of the contest. "Superstar" received mixed to positive reviews from music critics, most of whom felt it would be a potential single and praised the production, while others dismissed the lyrical content. A music video for the track was to be shot, however it was controversial since Madonna wanted to dress as a "Terror Bride", a combination of an Iraqi bridal veil and a US soldier's uniform. Subsequently, the video was never released. "Superstar" was used in a television campaign for US TV channel Bravo, supporting its "Summer by Bravo" promotion including stars from its original programming.

== Background and composition ==
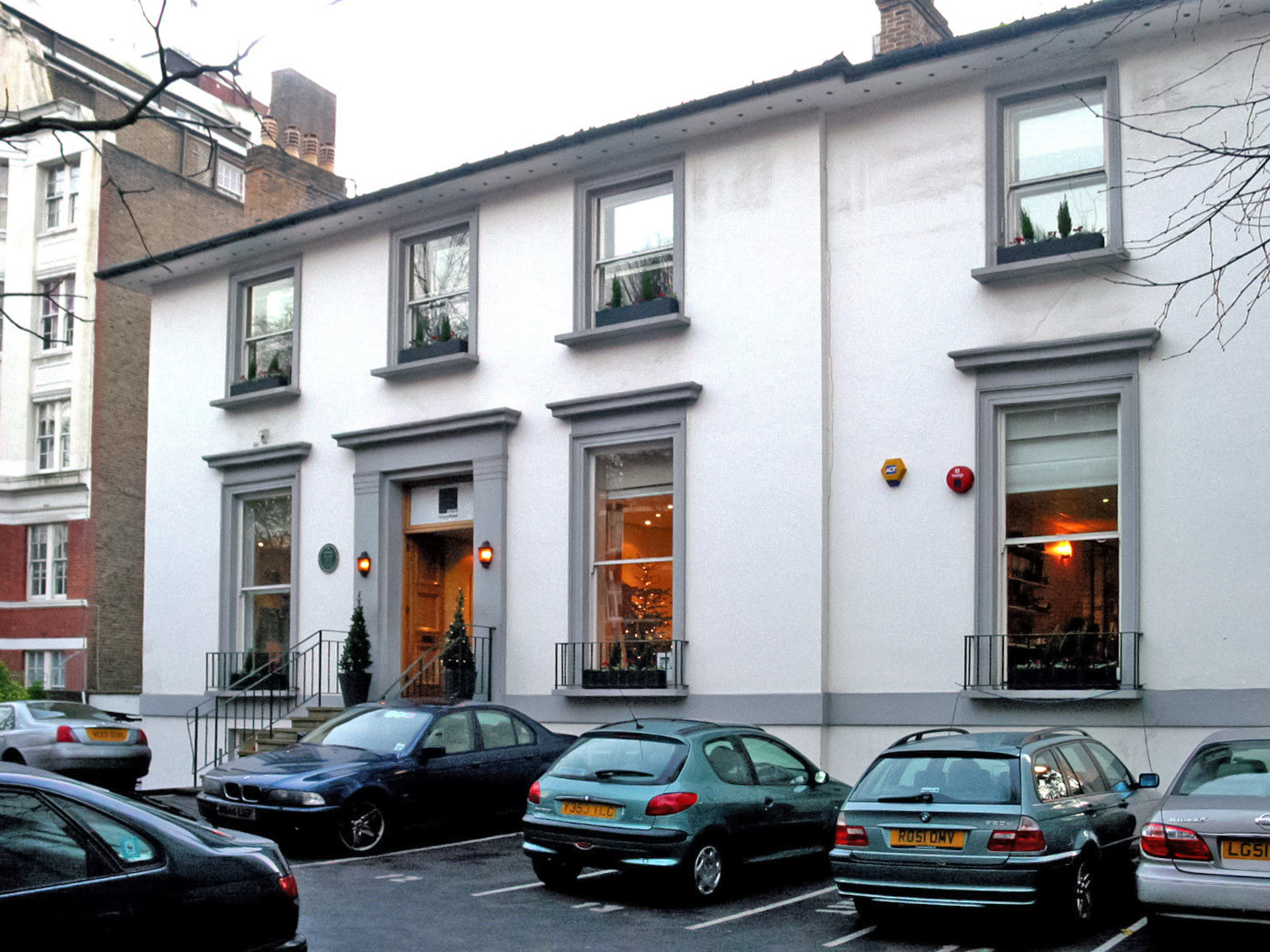
Abbey Road Studios, where MDNA was previewed and critics first heard "Superstar"

"Superstar" was written and produced by Madonna, Hardy "Indigo" Muanza and Michael Malih and was recorded at MSR Studios in New York City. After the completion of MDNA, critics around the world were invited to Abbey Road Studios for an initial review of the album. Many critics noted that Madonna's daughter Lourdes' vocals appeared in "Superstar", which was subsequently confirmed by the singer herself.

Musically, "Superstar" is an uptempo dance-pop song, that features influences of electronic and pop music. The track was mixed by Demacio 'Demo' Castellon for The Demolition Crew, and recorded by Angie Teo. Editing for the track was completed by Stephen 'The Koz' Kozmeniuk for The Demolition Crew. The song makes references to historical figures including Marlon Brando, James Dean, Al Capone, Bruce Lee, Julius Caesar, Abraham Lincoln and John Travolta. Billboard's Keith Caulfied noted dubstep influences during the bridge, and like other songs on MDNA, "Superstar" takes time to change the composition into a fast-paced track. According to Neil McCormick from The Daily Telegraph, the composition features a "shimmering ambiance built up from a ringing guitar loop and echoing tom-tom pattern that might have been constructed from Beatles' drum fills." Along with the looping music, the lyrics are simple and obtuse in nature, which McCormick believed was done deliberately like "You can have the password to my phone / I'll give you a massage when you get home". There are also references to her older songs like "Into the Groove" (1985) with the line, "You're Travolta getting into your groove".

== Artwork and release ==
The accompanying artwork for "Superstar" was created by Brazilian graffiti artist Simone Sapienza, known as Siss. It was directed by Binho Ribeiro and Giovanni Bianco. On the cover Madonna wears a shorts with a whip, while a phrase reads; "The shorts says: 'let's have dinner!'. The whip says, 'but you must pay for'". A contest sponsored by Keep Walking Brazil project selected 30 proposed covers, and Sapienza was chosen by Madonna after being among the ten finalists. The creator said she did not know she was participating in a cover contest and explained, "My work is connected to the status of women. I like strong women, who work hard for what they think is right."

"Superstar" was released as a promotional single in Brazil on December 3, 2012. Readers of Brazilian newspaper Folha de S.Paulo received a free copy of the single together with their newspaper. The single features the original album version along with a remixed version by DJ Eddie Amador. The song was also used in a television campaign for US TV channel Bravo, supporting its "Summer by Bravo" promotion including stars from its original programming.

In January 2026, Madonna released the "Superstar" EP, which included the Eddie Amador remix, to digital download and streaming sites.

== Critical reception ==
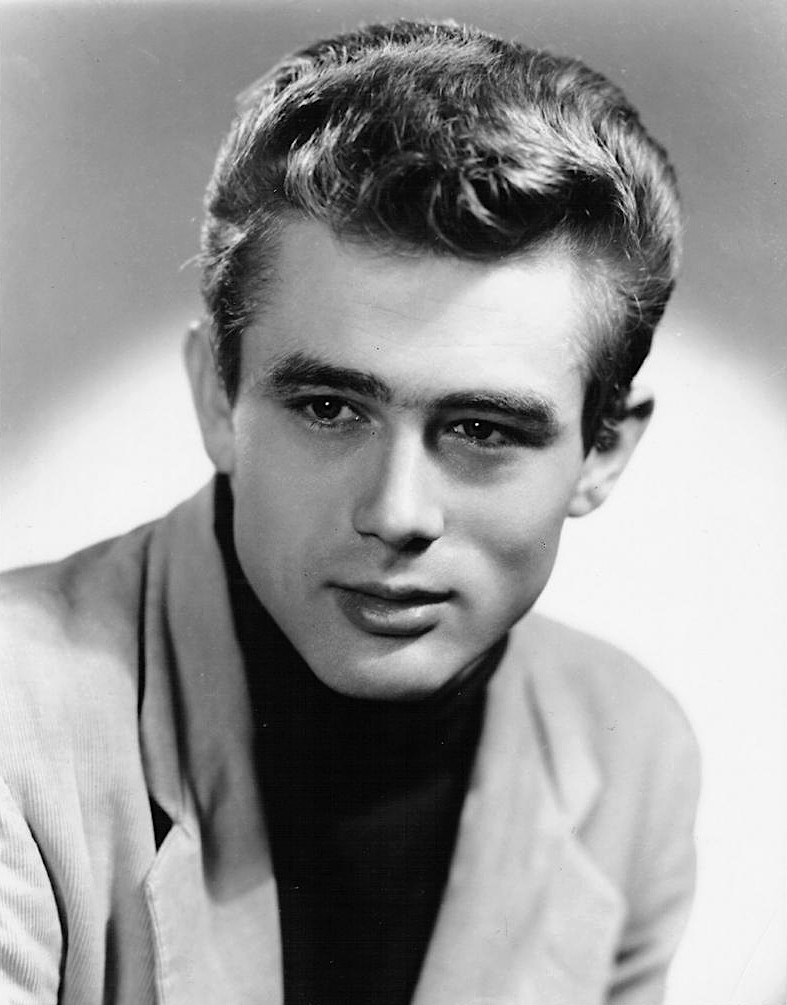
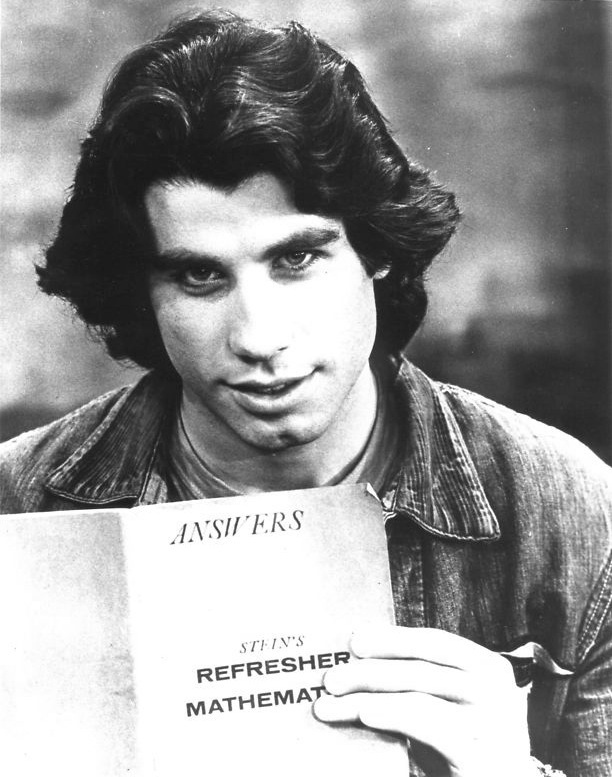
The lyrics for "Superstar" name actors like James Dean and John Travolta.

"Superstar" received generally mixed to favorable reviews from music critics. Andy Gill from The Independent stated the song was an "obvious hit single" and compared the song to her 1990 release, "Vogue". MuuMuse's Bradley Stern complimented "the sugary-sweet, instantly summer-friendly" nature of the song, while Alexis Petridis from The Guardian described the composition of the track as "saccharine". Priya Elan from NME was very positive towards the song, and described it, along with "Girl Gone Wild", as "accomplishments" and "sound better than they have any right to." While reviewing the album, Robert Copsey from Digital Spy noted that "Superstar" was the most "relaxed [sounding] song" compared to the rest of the tracks which he described as kind of "in-yer-face." Neil McCormick from The Daily Telegraph described the song as "sweet and summery". Writing for Popjustice, Brad O'Mance rated the song 9 out of 10 and explained in detail:

The lyrical reference points in ['Superstar'] are all quite interesting—if you consider the youth-obsessed reference collaborators of the first two singles and how uncomfortable it all feels. 'Superstar' offers a glimpse of something far more comfortable in its own skin. All the reference points will mean very little to your average 17-year-old. We suppose the idea is that they're icons whose imagery transcends generations blah blah blah but after all the aggressive positioning of the first two singles it's great to hear Madonna relaxing into this sort of song. The lyrics about being in love are a bit soppy but love makes you go a bit soppy sometimes.

Michael Roffman from Consequence of Sound was more critical towards the lyrical content, describing the song itself as "infantile" and her lyrics like they were "stripped from a fifth grader's notebook at the history fair." Slant Magazine's Sal Cinquemani gave it a mixed review, calling its lyrical content a "faux pas". Another mixed reception came from writers of Virgin Media, who awarded it three stars out of five, and called it a "passable slice of electro-hued chart-pop." Enio Chiola from PopMatters gave it a poor review for its lyrical content by calling it "badly written", but stated that songs like "'Superstar' and 'Masterpiece' indicates that Madonna isn't just a blubbering mess of bitterness." In his review of MDNA for Pitchfork, Matthew Perpetua said that the track, along with "B-Day Song" from the album, are "mesmerizingly dumb lyrics" and are as "spiteful trolling rather than vapid pandering." Gigwise listed the lyrics as one of the most embarrassing moments on MDNA. In August 2018, Billboard picked it as the singer's 86th greatest single; "a blatant copycat of Solveig's smash Dragonette collab 'Hello', it also has one of the sweetest, most straightforward choruses of the whole MDNA set".

== Music video ==
Although no music video was officially confirmed or produced, media outlets reported that a music video for "Superstar" was to be shot in October 2012. Madonna wanted to dress as a "Terror Bride", which is a combination of an Iraqi bridal veil and a US soldier's uniform. The dress was to be portrayed as a statement for oppression against women and warfare. However, the singer's advisers talked her out of wearing the costume because they thought it would "put her life at risk". Sources then stated "[Madonna] had the outfit ready to go. She was really proud of it and said it was her 'Terror Bride' costume [...] At first, when people started telling her it was madness, she just brushed it off, but when they mentioned that her actions could put her life at risk, she decided to ditch it from her video and certainly won't be wearing it on stage." Madonna said she was "really disappointed" about not wearing the outfit, but had put aside the idea for a future use.

== Track listing ==
- Keep Walking Brazil Special Edition CD single
1. "Superstar" – 3:55
2. "Superstar" (Eddie Amador Remix) – 6:18

== Credits and personnel ==
Credits adapted from the MDNA album liner notes.

- Madonna – vocals, songwriter, producer
- Hardy "Indigo" Muanza – songwriter, producer
- Michael Malih – songwriter, producer
- Demacio 'Demo' Castellon – audio mixing for The Demolition Crew
- Angie Teo – recording at MSR Studios, New York City
- Stephen 'The Koz' Kozmeniuk – music editing for The Demolition Crew
- Lourdes "Lola" Leon – background vocals

== Charts ==
After the release of MDNA, "Superstar" debuted at number 150 on the South Korea International Downloads chart, with a total of 174,917 streams and digital downloads.

Chart (2012)	Peak position
South Korea International Downloads (GAON)	150

== Release history ==
Country	Date	Format	Label
Brazil	December 3, 2012	Free CD single with Folha de S.Paulo	Interscope
