= Julien Jabre =

French-Lebanese electronic music composer, producer, and audio engineer

- Born: November 1976 (age 49)
- Genres: House, techno, deep house, tech house
- Occupations: Producer, composer, sound engineer
- Instruments: Synthesizer, programming, sequencer
- Years active: Since 1996
- Labels: Elias, Basic, Yellow, Defected, Ultra
- Website: Official website

Julien Jabre (born November 1976) is a French-Lebanese electronic music composer, producer, and audio engineer. Specializing in house music, he is associated with the French house.

== Biography ==
During the mid-'90s, three French house music pioneers, DJ Deep, DJ Gregory, and Alex from Tokyo, hosted a radio show dedicated to electronic music on the Parisian station FG. A fan of the show A Deep Groove, Julien Jabre met them in 1994 through a friend who was interning at the radio. He made his DJ debut during a guest appearance by DJ Gregory, who entrusted him with the decks for the first time. Over the next two years, he frequently appeared on the radio.

In 1997, the track "Faithfull" under the alias Fantom was released with Julien Jabre's as a producer. The success of Fantom was soon followed by "The Deep," another collaboration, this time with DJ Deep, and then Soha, a New York continuation of his partnership with Gregory. Simultaneously, he began releasing solo tracks on Basic Recordings, starting with "Jungle" and later the deep house EP "Time," which included tracks like "That Day" and "Delivrance".

In the early 2000s, Julien Jabre started gaining recognition with tracks like "Voodance" and "Yalopa". At the time, he distanced himself from the scene and DJing.
His first full-length release, released in 2003, was a compilation The Disco-Tech of Julien Jabre. This selection was published on the Yellow Productions label.

That same year, he established his own label, Elias.

Throughout the rest of the decade, Julien Jabre collaborated with artists including Dimitri From Paris (particularly on official remixes for the group CHIC) and Martin Solveig, both in mixing and production capacities. Simultaneously, he continued his solo career. "Swimming Places," released in 2006, is revered as a house music classic. He started collaborating with the Venezuelan group Los Amigos Invisibles, mixing three tracks on the album "Comercial," which won a Latin Grammy for Best Alternative Music Album.

In 2009, he released the EP "Wonderland" on Defected, following the previous year's release of "Talking Walls". Also on Defected, the compilation DJ Gregory & Julien Jabre – House Masters was released.

During the 2010s, Julien Jabre worked as a producer, composer, and sound engineer on an international level.

In 2012, he gained attention by co-writing an album for Madonna, MDNA, alongside Martin Solveig. He co-wrote two tracks, including "I Don't Give A" performed as a duet with Nicki Minaj. In 2019, he co-produced "Thando" with South African producer Black Coffee.

In 2019, he resumed his solo career and released the EP "Samana" / "Far at Sea" on his label Elias.

== Film Music ==
Starting in 2007, Julien Jabre began working on film soundtracks. He partnered with Michael Tordjman (co-founder of Basic Recordings label). Their initial collaboration was on Stéphane Clavier's thriller film, Paris Under Watch. He subsequently composed scores for feature films like Aux yeux de tous by Cédric Jimenez (2012), Rattrapage by Tristan Séguéla (2017), and La Collection by Emmanuel Blanchard (2018).

== The Joubert Singers ==
Julien Jabre contributed to the American gospel group, The Joubert Singers, whose track "Stand on the Word" recorded in 1982 by Phyliss McKoy Joubert with her church choir, then released by Next Plateau in 1985. Julien Jabre convinced the record label, Universal, to re-record and release the track along with other recordings. Eventually, Universal opted to publish a remix under the name Keedz, which gained considerable success, notably as the theme song for Le Grand Journal on Canal+. The re-recorded and unreleased version of "Stand on the Word" with Phyliss McKoy Joubert was unveiled to the public in 2011 through the movie Polisse. In 2015, Julien Jabre released this version, along with the entire album re-recorded by Joubert with the children of the original choir members, on his label Elias.
