= Gang Bang (song) =

Song performed by Madonna

Song by Madonna

from the album MDNA
- Released: March 23, 2012
- Recorded: 2011
- Studio: 3:20 Studios (Los Angeles, California); MSR Studios (New York City)
- Genre: Dance; electronic; electropop; techno
- Length: 5:26
- Label: Interscope
- Songwriters: Madonna; Mika; William Orbit; Priscilla Hamilton; Keith Harris; Jean-Baptiste; Don Juan "Demo" Casanova; Stephen Kozmeniuk
- Producers: Madonna; Orbit; The Demolition Crew

MDNA track listing
- 16 tracks: 1. "Girl Gone Wild"; 2. "Gang Bang"; 3. "I'm Addicted"; 4. "Turn Up the Radio"; 5. "Give Me All Your Luvin'"; 6. "Some Girls"; 7. "Superstar"; 8. "I Don't Give A"; 9. "I'm a Sinner"; 10. "Love Spent"; 11. "Masterpiece"; 12. "Falling Free"; Deluxe edition: 13. "Beautiful Killer"; 14. "I Fucked Up"; 15. "B-Day Song"; 16. "Best Friend"

Licensed audio
- "Gang Bang" on YouTube

"Gang Bang" is a song recorded by American singer Madonna, from her twelfth studio album MDNA (2012). It was written by Madonna, Mika, William Orbit, Priscilla Hamilton, Keith Harris, Jean-Baptiste, Don Juan "Demo" Casanova, and produced by Madonna, Orbit and The Demolition Crew. Madonna cited American director Quentin Tarantino as an inspiration for the song, revealing that she wanted him as the director for the song's music video.

A dance, electronic, electropop and techno song, it lyrically portrays a scorned woman seeking revenge on her lover. Police sirens, whispered vocals, throbbing beats and a dubstep breakdown provide the song with a suspense-filled atmosphere. The song received critical acclaim, most calling it a highlight of the album and also the boldest track of the album. Some even hailed it as one of Madonna's best songs.

"Gang Bang" charted on the French Singles Chart and the Dance/Electronic Digital Song Sales chart, due to digital downloads from MDNA. Madonna performed the song on the MDNA Tour, in a motel setting where she is seen shooting the male dancers who infiltrate her room, with blood being splattered on the backdrop. The performance was heavily criticized for its use of guns, but received favorable reviews from critics.

== Background and inspiration ==
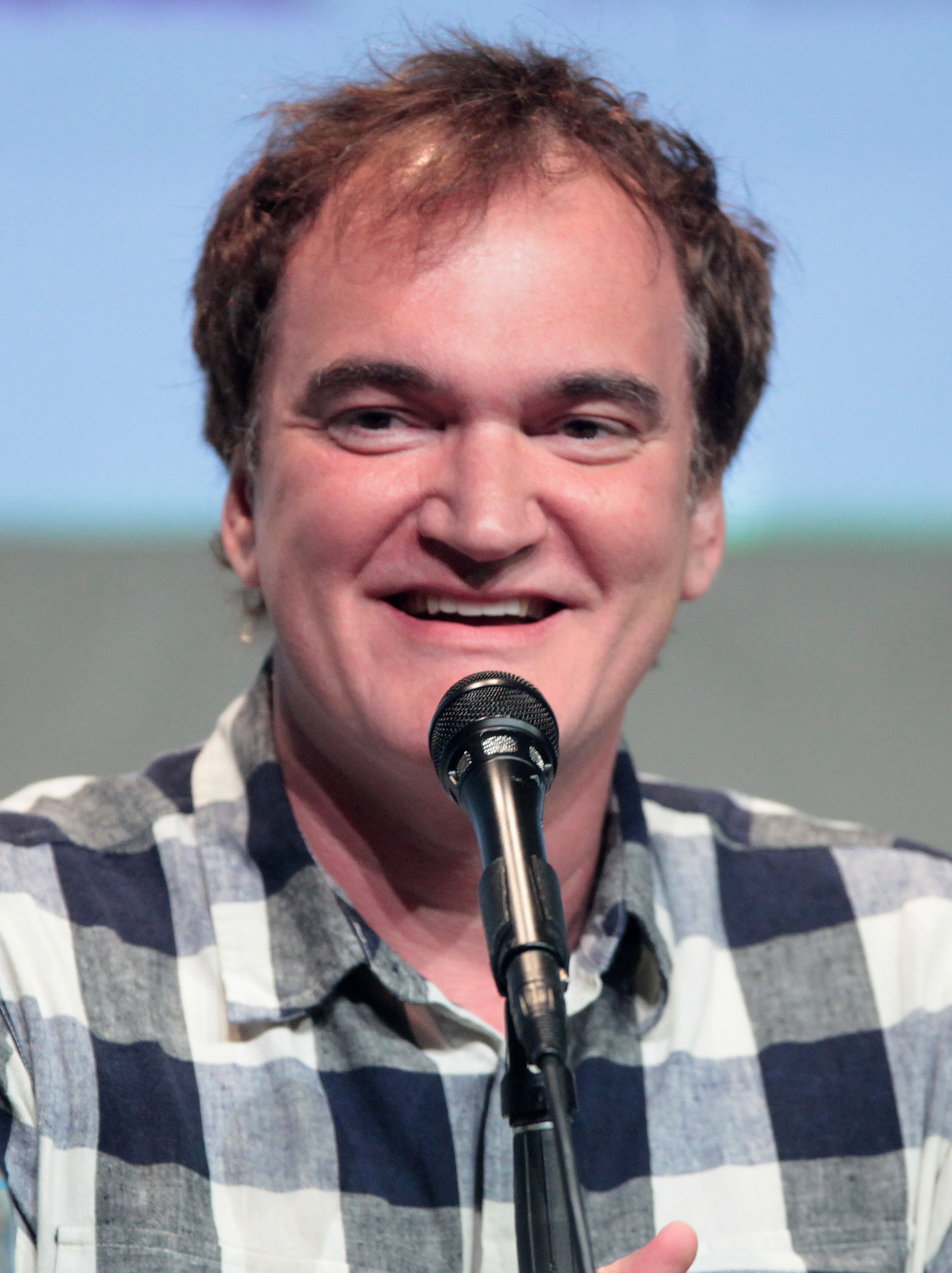
Madonna wrote the song with the American film director Quentin Tarantino in mind to direct its music video.

While working on her then-upcoming album, MDNA, Madonna enlisted William Orbit to work with her again; Orbit had previously worked with Madonna on songs like "Ray of Light", "Frozen" and "Beautiful Stranger", among others. The producer insisted that despite the abundance of pop music on the charts at that time, they did not pay much attention to what was being played on Top 40 radio. Instead, they focused on their own music and the "bubble of creativity" they were living in. Orbit also revealed, "We liked what we're doing in this current time and space," he continued. "What we tended to do was watch old French films from the '60s or listen to music that was so far away that it wasn't, in any way, relevant."

Among the songs recorded for the album, "Gang Bang" was confirmed by Madonna to be part of the track listing, which was revealed on her official website in February 2012. On March 8, the singer and co-writer of the track, Mika, tweeted that it was "weird as fuck, underground and lyrically cool; it's amazing and bizarre. I love it, she sounds so good singing words so harsh." The same day, a snippet of the track was released. Orbit also commented about the song's dark tone and lyrics:

"[It's] aggressive". "It's like she sang that off the bat. I mean that. She created it in the moment. And the lyrics were all there, but I think she fell into a character. It was actually a good day. It wasn't a dark day. There wasn't like aggression in the air. The demo created out of the blue pretty much. She loved the spirit of it. We were all dancing around the control room. ... It was a total atmosphere of spontaneity. Pretty good fun, but it's dark."

Madonna said that she wrote "Gang Bang" with director Quentin Tarantino in mind, saying, "That's who I was thinking about when I was writing the song. I was picturing one of his movies, and one of the female characters. I have a whole thing worked out. All Quentin has to do is show up with a camera. I can't afford a director's fee." However, when asked about the video, Tarantino said, "I don't know. I've been asked to direct commercials and music videos, Madonna and Jay-Z wanted me to direct their videos, but I refused. I'm not interested, just as I'm not interested in commercials. If it's not to make movies, I don't want to be on set."

== Composition ==
"Gang Bang"
A 30-second sample of "Gang Bang", which music critics acclaimed for its lyrics and experimental sounds.

"Gang Bang" was written by Madonna and Orbit with Priscilla Hamilton, Keith Harris, Jean-Baptiste, Mika, Don Juan "Demo" Casanova, and produced by Madonna, Orbit and the Demolition Crew. It is the longest song on the album, lasting for 5 minutes and 26 seconds. Lyrically, it follows a woman getting her cronies together to seek bloody vengeance against someone, with the singer declaring, "Shot you dead, shot my lover in the head / I'm going straight to hell / I've got a lot of friends there," before yelling, "Drive bitch, die bitch!". It ends with the line: "If you're going to [act] like a bitch then you're going to die like a bitch." According to MTV News' Bradley Stern, the song "revisits the role of the scorned songstress from Erotica's 'Thief of Hearts' (1992)."

"Gang Bang" is a dark dance, electronic, electropop and techno song with a dubstep breakdown in its middle eight and industrial-tinged beats. Michael Cragg from The Guardian commented that the track "recalls her American Life album in its slightly uneasy marrying of genres".

== Critical reception ==
The song received critical acclaim. Michael Cragg of The Guardian wrote that it is "a ridiculous collection of sound effects (police sirens, gunshots) and imposing menace that's actually pretty fun in a kind of slightly unhinged way." Neil McCormick of The Telegraph wrote that the song is "a solid techno groove and one of the album's odder and most interesting tracks." Stern commented that the song "is not only the highlight of the record, but a highlight of Madonna's career." Matthew Perpetua of Pitchfork wrote that "it's the album's boldest, most experimental track, and it's marred only by a just-off vocal performance that renders her very familiar voice a bit anonymous, and a halfhearted attempt at a dub-step bass drop." Nick Levine of BBC Music called it "a preposterous piece of pop schlock."

Priya Elan of NME wrote that "the music is cold and minimal, recalling the grubby house beats of Erotica, and Madge bleats on like some antagonistic disco Fury driven to the edge by her thirst for vengeance. And gosh, it's thrilling stuff." Sal Cinquemani of Slant Magazine called it "a standout cut in which Madonna quite convincingly portrays a jilted bride turned femme fatale in the vein of Beatrix Kiddo," writing that it "plays more like a piss take of Ritchie's gangster fetish than a glorification of it." Melinda Newman of HitFix called it "one of the most compelling tracks, with Madonna singing in a low whispery register, detailing that she’s shot her lover dead in the head and, furthermore, she has no regrets. It’s violent and explicit and it’s what Madonna used to represent: a sense of danger." Jim Farber of New York Daily News called it "historic" and "may be the world's first murder-ballad-as-disco song." Samuel R. Murrian from Parade ranked it at number 72 on his list of Madonna's 100 greatest songs, calling it "a vintage grindhouse exploitation revenge flick within a tune. This vividly cinematic track builds and builds until she's screaming at the end. It's a lot of fun".

== Commercial performance ==
"Gang Bang" entered some record charts due to digital downloads from MDNA. It entered the French Singles Chart at number 93 for issue date of March 31, 2012. In the United States, the song charted on the Billboard Dance/Electronic Digital Song Sales at number 30. In South Korea, the song debuted at number 90 on the Gaon International Downloads Chart with sales of 3,653 copies.

== Live performance and controversy ==
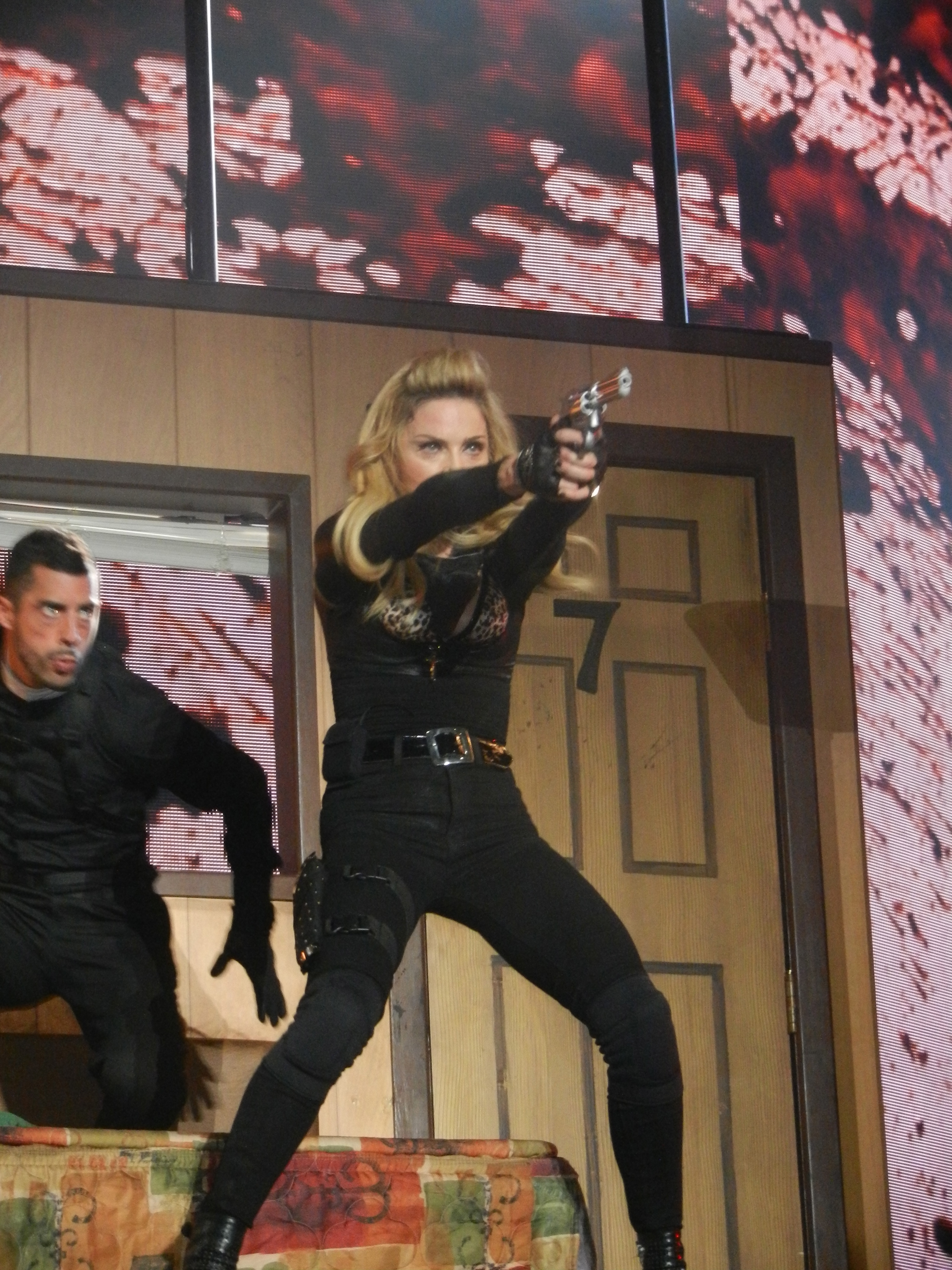
Madonna shooting a gun while performing "Gang Bang" during the MDNA Tour in 2012. Behind her, blood can be seen spattered on the backdrops.

"Gang Bang" was added to the setlist of the MDNA Tour (2012), and performed as the third song. In the performance, Madonna attacks several of her dancers with a fake gun in a moving "Paradise Motel", as blood spattered in the backdrop screens. The performance was condemned by groups like Mothers Against Guns, who said the singer should "know better". Audience member reactions were pretty severe, with one commenting, "We're dancing and all of a sudden people started realizing what the song was". A member of her tour staff told The Huffington Post that "Madonna would rather cancel her show than censor her art. Her entire career, she has fought against people telling her what she can and cannot do. She's not about to start listening to them now". Madonna herself explained the use of guns in a letter:

"I do not condone violence or the use of guns", she wrote. "Rather they are symbols of wanting to appear strong and wanting to find a way to stop feelings that I find hurtful or damaging. In my case I want to stop the lies and hypocrisy of the church, the intolerance of many narrow minded cultures and societies I have experienced throughout my life and in some cases the pain I have felt from having my heart broken".

She further commented about the controversy in an interview for Good Morning America, saying that she would not remove the weapons from the performance, adding: "That would be like asking people to not have guns in action movies... I mean, the thing is, guns don't kill people, people kill people. That whole first section of the show is like an action movie, and I was playing a super-vixen who wanted revenge".

While reviewing the live album MDNA World Tour, Arnold Wayne Jones of the Dallas Voice wrote that the "blood-spattering projections during 'Bang Bang', Madonna reminds us why we've followed her machinations for nearly 30 years". Entertainment Focus criticized those who complained about the violence on the performance, writing that, "This is a Madonna show and she's never been anything less than ballsy". Jim Farber of New York Daily News wrote that the song "could be history’s first disco murder ballad", saying that in the performance, "Madonna blows away an army of intruders with enough relish to secure a starring role in the next Quentin Tarantino gorefest".

Saeed Saeed of The National agreed, calling the performance, "a Quentin Tarantino revenge romp". Glenn Gamboa of Newsday called it "a season of Dexter condensed into five minutes, complete with blood splatters on the massive video screens". Mario Tarradell of The Dallas Morning News wrote that the performance "was all perfectly staged, and it had a clear message: Madonna will not be hindered". Andrew Matson of The Seattle Times wrote "the violence was so over the top, it overshadowed the rest of the show".

== Credits and personnel ==
- Madonna – songwriter, producer, vocals
- William Orbit – songwriter, producer
- Mika – songwriter
- Priscilla Renea Hamilton – songwriter
- Keith Harris – songwriter
- Don Juan "Demo" Casanova – songwriter, producer, mixer, drums & bass
- Jean-Baptiste – songwriter
- Stephen Kozmeniuk – songwriter, editor, keyboards,
- Michael Turco – producer, additional synths

Credits adapted from the liner notes of MDNA.

== Charts ==
Chart (2012)	Peak position
France (SNEP)	93
South Korea International (GAON)	90
US Dance/Electronic Digital Song Sales (Billboard)	30
