= I Don't Give A =

Song by Madonna featuring Nicki Minaj

from the album MDNA
- Released: March 23, 2012
- Recorded: 2011
- Studio: Sarm West Studios (London, England); MSR Studios (New York City)
- Genre: Electro-funk, House
- Length: 3:53
- Label: Interscope
- Songwriters: Madonna; Martin Solveig; Nicki Minaj; Julien Jabre
- Producers: Madonna; Martin Solveig

MDNA track listing
- 16 tracks: 1. "Girl Gone Wild"; 2. "Gang Bang"; 3. "I'm Addicted"; 4. "Turn Up the Radio"; 5. "Give Me All Your Luvin'"; 6. "Some Girls"; 7. "Superstar"; 8. "I Don't Give A"; 9. "I'm a Sinner"; 10. "Love Spent"; 11. "Masterpiece"; 12. "Falling Free"; Deluxe edition: 13. "Beautiful Killer"; 14. "I Fucked Up"; 15. "B-Day Song"; 16. "Best Friend"

Licensed audio
- "I Don’t Give A" on YouTube

"I Don't Give A" is a song recorded by American singer-songwriter Madonna for her twelfth studio album MDNA (2012). The song features rap vocals by American recording artist Nicki Minaj. It was written and produced by Madonna and Martin Solveig, with additional songwriting by Minaj and Julien Jabre. "I Don't Give A" is an electro-funk song with syncopated electronic hip hop and industrial house beats.

Lyrically, the song is about a day in Madonna's life with some portions of it directed at her ex-husband, film director Guy Ritchie, when she sings about a failed marriage. The song received generally favorable reviews from music critics who praised Minaj's appearance and its personal lyrics. Following the release of MDNA, the song peaked at number 117 in the Gaon Chart of South Korea. Madonna performed the song on the MDNA Tour as the closing track of the show's first segment.

== Background and production ==
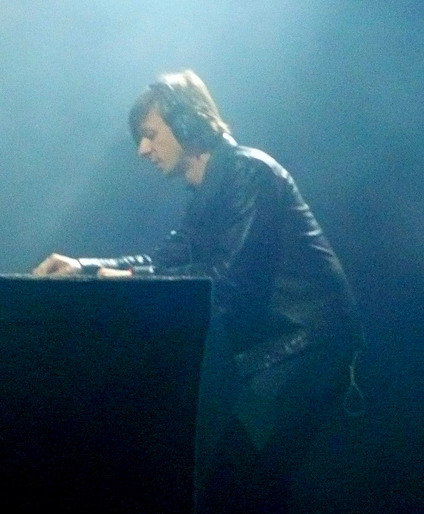
Martin Solveig (pictured) co-wrote and co-produced "I Don't Give A".

Madonna's manager Guy Oseary had contacted Martin Solveig wanting to know if he would be available to work with the singer, to which he responded affirmative. In July 2011, the singer invited Solveig for a writing session in London for her twelfth studio album, MDNA. This session produced three songs, including "I Don't Give A", "Give Me All Your Luvin'" and "Turn Up the Radio", the last two later becoming official singles off the album. According to the producer, few days after he had finished the composition, Madonna completed writing the lyrics of "I Don't Give A" . Solveig understood that the lyrics were probable references towards Madonna's life and thus received coverage in the press. However, he was not aware of the inner meaning behind the lyrics. With Billboard magazine, the producer further explained:

At first I thought we were going to work on one song; that was the original plan. Let's try to work on one song and take it from there – not spend too much time thinking about the legend, and do something that just makes sense. [...] We did one song and another song, and we were having fun making music. And actually it was a very privileged time. She wasn't under any kind of pressure, she had time to spend on it; it was the only thing she had to work on.

In an interview with Channel V Australia, he recalled that the two of them were able to communicate their thoughts about the tracks they developed, "on an organisational level", thus accelerating the process. Madonna was completely involved in the recording which was a surprise for Solveig, since he had expected the singer not to stay more than an hour or two in the recording studio and then leave. Madonna expressed her thoughts about the composition, including the instrumentation to be used as Solveig added, "at some point she wanted to choose the sound of a snare drum or a synth and that kind of stuff. She was really in the session!" Madonna reciprocated the feelings saying that she liked Solveig's way of working: "He's very organised and methodical in his thinking so I like his work process". The singer also stated that she was able to disapprove something which she did not like without hurting his feelings.

Regarding having Minaj feature as a guest vocalist, Madonna explained that she wanted to collaborate with female singers she believed had a "strong sense of themselves". They were shy of each other in the beginning but were able to pass that and dedicate to the tracks. Solveig described Minaj as a "pro" and recalled that she spent some time with the songs and wrote her rapping verse and recorded it within a short span of time.

== Recording and composition ==
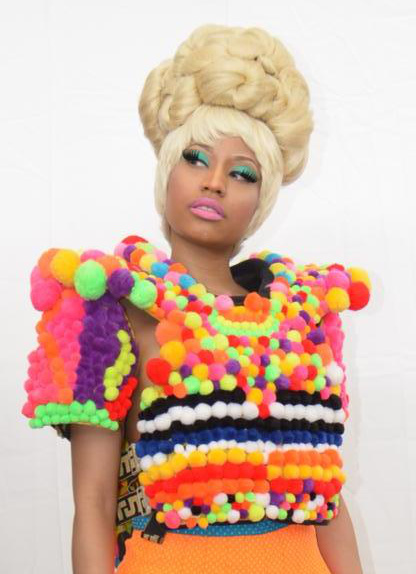
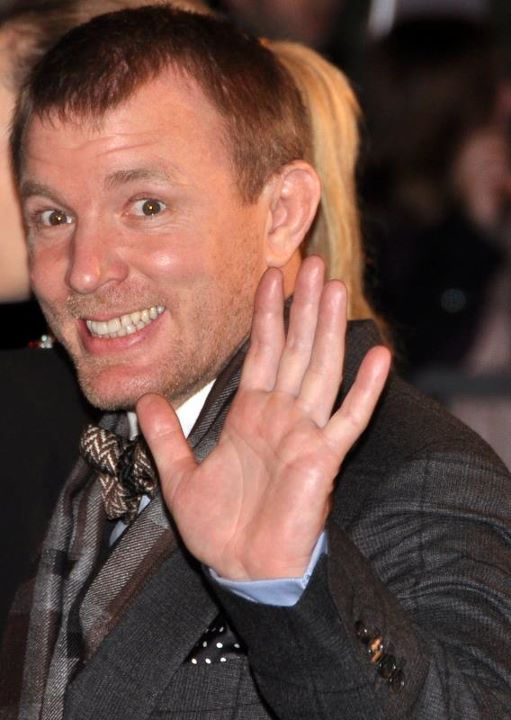
"I Don't Give A" features a rap by Nicki Minaj (left) and has lyrics about Madonna's ex-husband Guy Ritchie (right).

"I Don't Give A" was written by Madonna, Solveig, Minaj and Julien Jabre. Production was handled by Madonna and Solveig, while Minaj provided rap vocals for the track. It was mixed by Demacio "Demo" Castellon for The Demolition Crew, while it was recorded by Castellon, Philippe Weiss and Graham Archer, with additional recording by Jason "Metal" Donkersgoed, also for The Demolition Crew. The recording took place at Sarm West Studios, London, England and MSR Studios, New York City. Minaj appeared for one day during the recording, finishing off her work in "I Don't Give A" as well as "Give Me All Your Luvin'". Jabre also provided electric guitars, drums and synths, while Solveig provided additional instrumentation. Ron Taylor did the vocal editing for the track while Michael Turco added the outro music for The Demolition Crew. Other personnel working on the song included Romain Faure and Angie Teo, the latter of whom worked as mixing assistant.

"I Don't Give A" is a midtempo "pop-flavoured" electro-funk song with "ballsy" electronic hip hop and industrial beats. Tracklisted after the initial dance tunes in MDNA, the mood for the song is dark and somber, with a Sturm und Drang chorus and backed by an orchestra that The New York Times reviewer Jon Pareles compared to composer Carl Orff's cantata, Carmina Burana. The ending of the song consists of a big outro, with "grandiose" choirs, "crashing" cymbals and "escalating" strings. Critics noted that Madonna's rap in the song is similar to that on her 2003 single "American Life".

Lyrically "I Don't Give A" describes a day in the life of Madonna, with the singer working through her schedule. The verses during the chorus are representative of how Madonna had previously ignored her detractors, instead choosing to express it with her music with the lines, "I'm moving fast, Can you follow my track, I'm livin' fast, And I like it like that, I do ten things all at once, And if you have a problem, I don't give a." During the bridge, the lyrics presumably talks about a marriage which did not work out for unknown reasons, "I tried to be a good girl/ I tried to be your wife/ I diminished myself/ And I swallowed my light." Many critics agreed that the song has pretty direct lyrics that seem to take aim at her ex-husband, film director Guy Ritchie. However, when asked if Ritchie was indeed the subject of the song, Madonna's representative Liz Rosenberg added that "[Madonna] has not explained the lyrics and if they are about someone specifically ... [but] I appreciate that people will speculate." The song ends with Minaj uttering the final line, "There's only one queen and that's Madonna. Bitch!"

Brandon Soderberg from Spin observed how the song was a narrative against her "haters", a theme predominant in rap music. This is enunciated with the lyrics addressing Ritchie and tabloids, along with some of Minaj's verses being directed against pop singer Lady Gaga, with whom Madonna had been compared to previously. Soderberg deduced that Madonna might have noticed the shifting themes in rap music, where it had become acceptable to boast about one's wealth, hence the lyrics had more of a Sex and the City vibe with its depiction of Madonna's "fairly awesome life".

== Critical reception ==
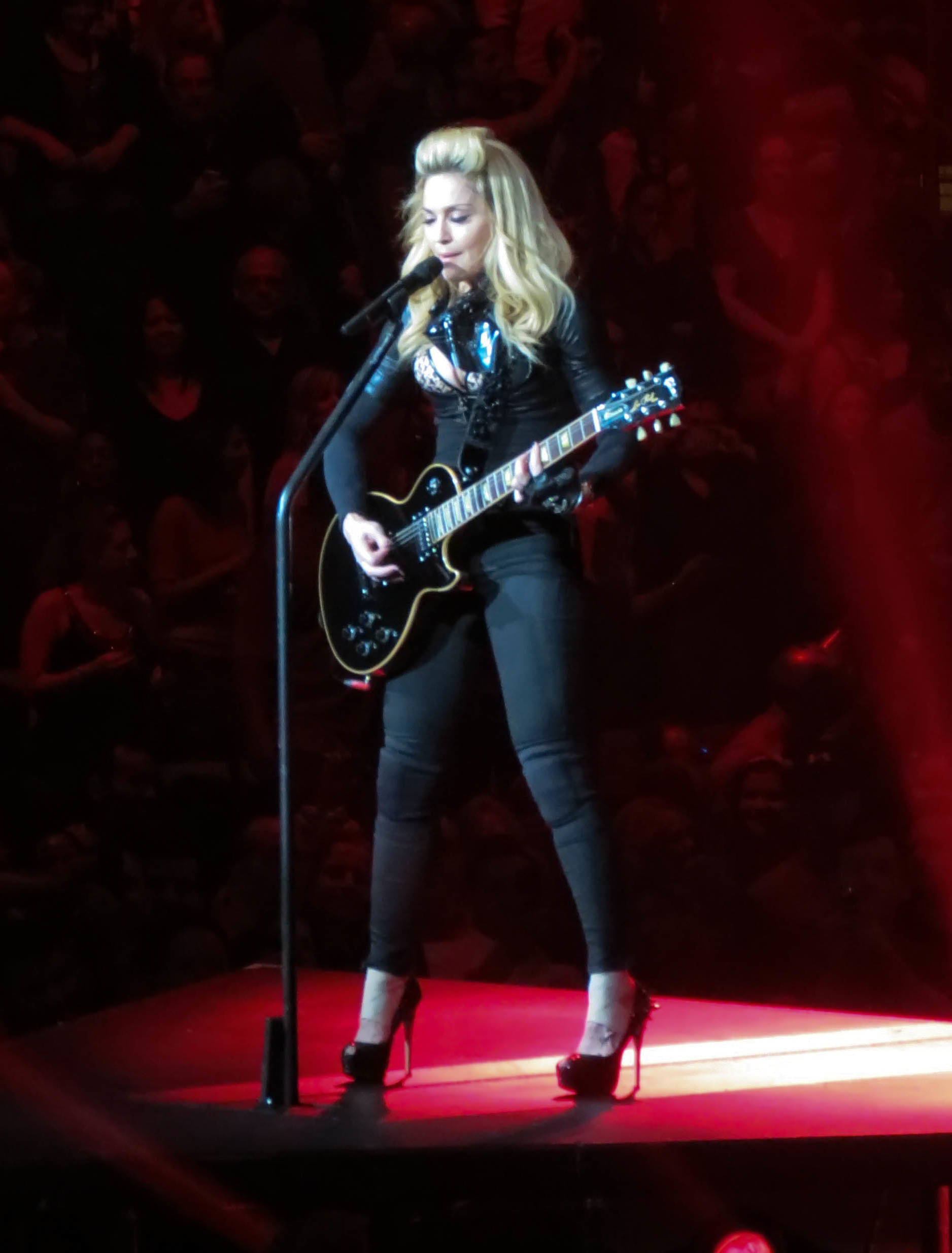
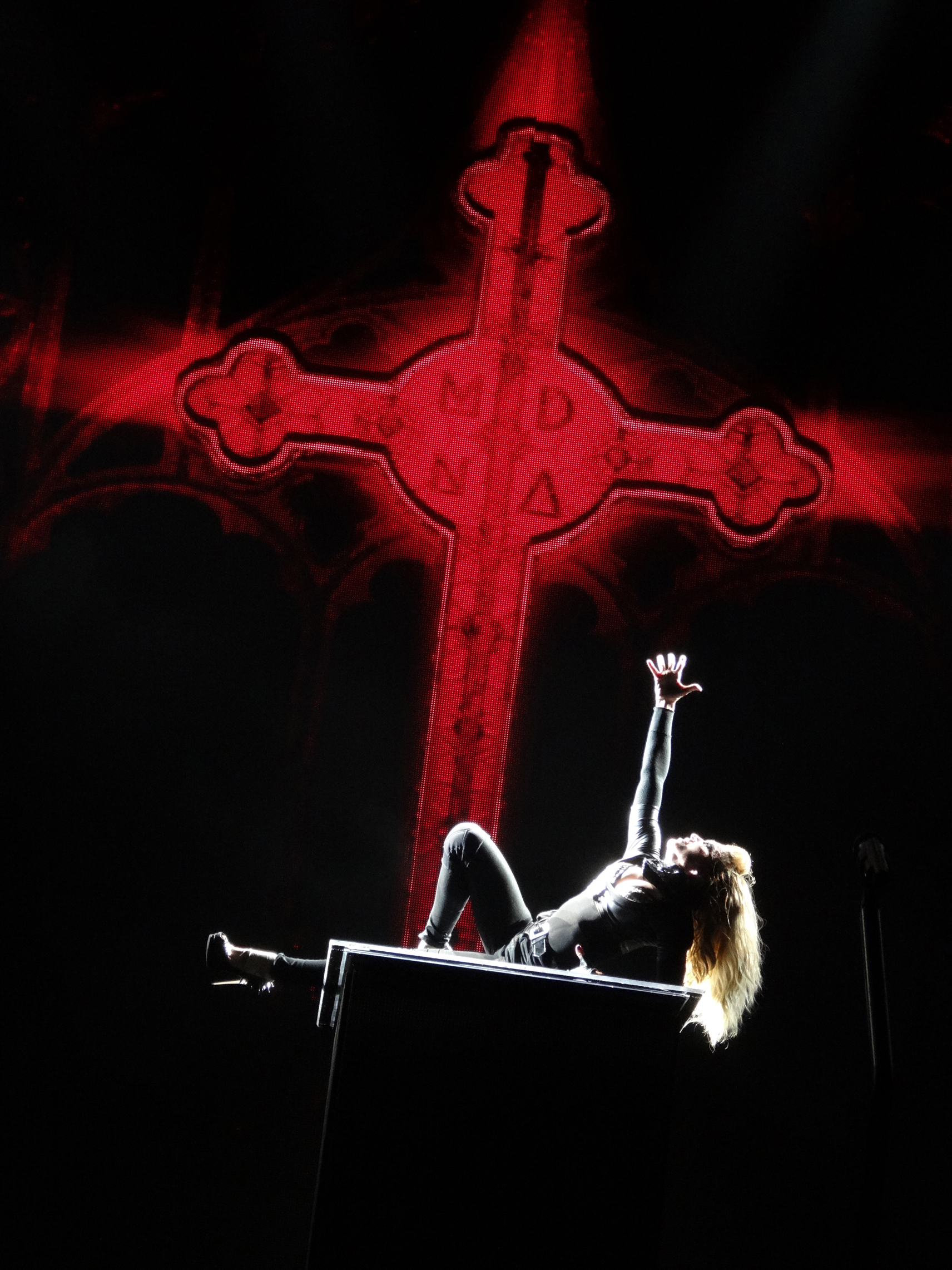
The live performance of "I Don't Give A" on the MDNA Tour (left) and its ending (right)

"I Don't Give A" received generally favorable reviews from music critics. Neal McCormick of The Daily Telegraph called it "an album highlight", writing that "there is real energy to this Martin Solveig production, though Nicki Minaj's explosive rap rather shows up Madonna's more static delivery". A writer from Virgin Media gave the song a rating of 4 out of 5 stars while complimenting the chorus. Michael Cragg of The Guardian labeled "I Don't Give A" as "brilliantly odd". He praised "the industrial beats" as well as "the spooky chants and out of nowhere [appearance of] Minaj".

Joel Meares of Time Out shared this view, adding that Minaj's rap verse was reminiscent of the times when Madonna's own songs were as good as the former's single "Starships". The Village Voice's Maura Johnston was also complimentary about Minaj, writing that, "[She] lays down a couple of rhymes that are by no means the best in her vast catalog, but her sudden presence shows that the music isn't the song's biggest weakness." Genevieve Koski of The A.V. Club also considered the rapper's performance as "one of her better features in a while", and better than her inclusion in the lead single "Give Me All Your Luvin'". Soderberg from Spin described the song as a "rap track that positions Nicki Minaj, as the brash, pop subversive in the tradition of Madonna" and criticized the latter's rapping, finding the vocals to be weak. Conversely, he appreciated Minaj's verses and vocal delivery, calling them "witty" and "confident".

Keith Caulfield of Billboard called it "a very rat-a-tat-tat song"; He complimented the lengthy orchestral portion of the track and called it "epic and sweeping, but comes out of nowhere". For Matthew Perpetua of Pitchfork the song showed how Madonna's strong rapping was upstaged by Minaj, "who turns in an entertaining performance that is nevertheless below the standards of her usual features". Nick Bond of Sydney Star Observer wrote that the song is "not her most GFC-friendly track", but explained that "Musically, it's the damp squib that was Hard Candy done right."

== Live performance ==
Madonna performed "I Don't Give A" on the MDNA Tour in 2012. The performance of the song closed the show's first segment known as Transgression, and found Madonna playing the guitar while Minaj appeared on the backdrops sitting on a throne singing her verse. Saeed Saeed of The National praised Madonna for "re-emerging once again triumphant in rock star mode," during the performance Kat Keogh of Birmingham Mail described that "The crowd was awash with a sea of camera phones as Madge grabbed a guitar for Nicki Minaj duet 'I Don’t Give A'." Jon Pareles of The New York Times was mixed in his review, writing that Madonna "still looks silly when, as she did in 'I Don't Give A', she slings an electric guitar and makes rocker-chick faces" and found it odd that "someone so physically disciplined can't fake better guitar moves." The performance was included on Madonna's fourth live album, MDNA World Tour.

== Credits and personnel ==
=== Management ===
- Nicki Minaj appears courtesy of Young Money Entertainment / Cash Money Records
- Webo Girl Publishing, Inc. (ASCAP), EMI Music Publishing France (SACEM), Money Mack Music / Harajuku Barbie Music adm. by Songs of Universal, Inc. (BMI)

=== Personnel ===
- Madonna – lead vocals, songwriter, producer
- Martin Solveig – songwriter, producer, additional drums, synths
- Nicki Minaj – guest vocals, songwriter
- Julien Jabre – songwriter, electric guitar, drums, synths
- Demacio "Demo" Castellon – recording, mixing for The Demolition Crew
- Philippe Weiss – recording
- Graham Archer – recording
- Jason "Metal" Donkersgoed – additional recording for The Demolition Crew
- Ron Taylor – vocal editing
- Romain Faure – additional synths
- Michael Turco – outro music for The Demolition Crew
- Angie Teo – mixing assistant

Credits adapted from the liner notes of MDNA.

== Charts ==
In South Korea, the song debuted at number 117 on the Gaon International Downloads Chart, selling 3,101 copies.

Chart (2012)	Peak position
South Korean International Singles (Gaon)	117
