= W.E. (soundtrack) =

W.E. (Music from the Motion Picture)

Soundtrack album by Abel Korzeniowski
- Released: January 31, 2012
- Recorded: April–May 2011
- Studio: Abbey Road Studios
- Genre: Film score; traditional orchestral; contemporary classical
- Length: 47:16
- Label: Interscope
- Producer: Abel Korzeniowski; William Orbit; Madonna

Abel Korzeniowski chronology
Copernicus' Star (2011)	W.E. (2012)	Escape from Tomorrow (2013)

Singles from W.E. (Music from the Motion Picture)
- 1. "Masterpiece" Released: April 1, 2012

W.E. (Music from the Motion Picture) is the soundtrack to the 2012 film W.E. written and directed by Madonna, and starred Abbie Cornish, Andrea Riseborough, Oscar Isaac, Richard Coyle, and James D'Arcy. The original score was written and produced by Polish composer Abel Korzeniowski, with eleven of them being featured in the film's soundtrack, whilst an original song featured the film's end credits "Masterpiece", performed by Madonna, was included in the soundtrack and later on Madonna's album, MDNA. The song would subsequently win the Best Original Song category at the 69th Golden Globe Awards, before the film's release. The soundtrack was released digitally through Interscope Records on January 31, 2012.

== Development ==
Madonna heard Korzeniowski's work on the soundtrack of A Single Man (2009) and remembered being "struck by the score's 'bittersweet' qualities, this melancholic, romantic, sweeping emotional kind of heartbreaking beauty." She then asked the film's director-fashion designer Tom Ford, about Korzeniowski and decided to sign him to compose W.E.'s score. Madonna also temp-tracked parts of score from A Single Man into the rough cut of W.E. The score features strings, electric guitar, harp, viola and piano, and the combination of instruments was used to bridge the film's two time periods.

Korzeniowski recorded a 60-piece orchestra conducted by Terry Davies at London's Abbey Road Studios in April 2011, adding that he concentrated on the characters' emotional states, and was not very concerned with differentiating the film's time periods. The composer said in a Variety interview that for the scenes featuring Simpson, he tried to make the score more modern than for those with Winthrop. Madonna wanted Korzeniowski to keep the score simple and direct, thinking that as a classically trained musician he would overcomplicate the score. He went on to say, "It is not the type of score where you go through crazy harmonic changes and modulations [...] This was one of the very precise notes I got from Madonna, that I was not supposed to over-think this music." The score was inspired by the film's irrational love, which Korzeniowski said could be "just an illusion". He wanted the music to reflect the film's powerful and conflicting emotions through the melodies, which alternated between despair and sorrow and hope and joy.

== Track listing ==
No.	Title	Writer(s)	Length
1.	"Charms"		4:03
2.	"Duchess Of Windsor"		3:09
3.	"Revolving Door"		4:19
4.	"I Will Follow You"		2:32
5.	"Abdication"		5:22
6.	"Six Hours"		3:30
7.	"Brooklyn Faces"		4:53
8.	"Evgeni's Waltz"		3:34
9.	"Satin Birds"		4:29
10.	"Letters"		4:19
11.	"Dance For Me Wallis"		3:08
12.	"Masterpiece" (performed by Madonna, appears on her twelfth studio album, MDNA)	Madonna; Julie Frost; Jimmy Harry	3:58
Total length:			47:16

== Reception ==
Writing for Main Titles, Bob den Hartog said "Without a strong thematic narrative progression, however, these pieces are never completely tied together, which makes W.E. seem more like a wonderful set of isolated concert pieces rather than a wholesome symphony, despite Korzeniowski’s best efforts to include recurring themes. Considering the quality of these well-rounded compositions, this shouldn’t be considered as a strong criticism for the album presentation (well hello, pop song-producer Madonna), but as a film score, it is a drawback from an otherwise outstanding work." A review from Music Muse stated "Abel Korzeniowski delivers one of the most attractive scores of the year. In fact, many of the highlights are worthy “best of the year” material. It seems as if the composer had a genuine sense of passion with this film (despite the criticism it has received for its superficial nature). That sense of magic and romanticism that is ever so prevalent in the music will make you wonder what in the film could have inspired such great music. Unfortunately, on a more technical level, the score fails to live up to its beauty. The fact that Korzeniowski took on different methods of thematic scoring in order to retain some sense of the emotional narrative (regardless of the inevitable flaws it will present) is an impressive way to handle the foolishness of his superiors. In the end, this score is a great success that serves as a model for composers burdened with production hassles everywhere."

== Accolades ==
At the 69th Golden Globe Awards, Korzeniowski received a nomination for Golden Globe Award for Best Original Score, while Madonna won Best Original Song for "Masterpiece". The song was however made ineligible for the similar category at the 84th Academy Awards, as it was not "used either in the body of the film, or as the 'first music cue' in the closing credits"; the song was played more one minute into the credits. Korzeniowski's score further received a nomination from the International Film Music Critics Association Award for Best Original Score for a Drama Film and won the Public Choice Award by the World Soundtrack Academy in 2012. Similarly, "Masterpiece" was also nominated for Best Original Song Written Directly for a Film but lost to Albert Nobbs theme "Lay Your Head Down" by Brian Byrne and Glenn Close.

== Personnel ==
Credits adapted from CD liner notes.

- Music production – Abel Korzeniowski
- Music assistance – Mina Korzeniowska
- Recording, mixing – Andrew Dudman
- Recording assistance – John Barrett, Paul Pritchard
- Editing – Nancy Allen
- Music supervisor – Maggie Rodford
- Assistant music supervisor – Helen Yates

Instruments

- Cello – Anthony Pleeth
- Piano – Michael A. Lang, Simon Chamberlain
- Viola – Vicci Wardman
- Violin – Thomas Bowes

Orchestra

- Orchestra leader – Julian Leaper
- Orchestration – Abel Korzeniowski
- Conductor – Terry Davies
- Contractor – Isobel Griffiths
- Assistant contractor – Jo Buckley

== Charts ==
Chart (2023)	Peak position
Hungarian Albums (MAHASZ)	37
