= Stand on the Word =

Song by Phyliss McKoy Joubert

Single by Joubert Singers
- Released: 1985
- Genre: Funk, post-disco, soul
- Length: 4:25
- Label: Next Plateau Records Inc.
- Songwriter: Phyliss McKoy Joubert

"Stand on the Word" is a funk/soul song written by Phyliss McKoy Joubert and recorded by the Joubert Singers, and remixed by George Rodriguez and Tony Humphries on Next Plateau Records Inc in 1985.

The original version was recorded in 1982, credited to The Celestial Choir on the compilation Somebody Prayed for This, produced by Phyliss Joubert and the First Baptist Church of Crown Heights, Inc. The 1985 Joubert Singers single is the well-known disco version.

Track list on 7" included

1. Stand on the Word (3:52)
2. Stand on the Word (original version) (4:25) (mixed by George Rodriquez, Tony Humphries)

The track list on the 12" and 33 ⅓ RPM extended single included:

1. Stand on the Word (6:24)
2. Stand on the Word (instrumental) (5:50)
3. Stand on the Word (original version) (4:44)
4. Stand on the Word (6:40)

Chart (2012)	Peak position
SNEP French singles chart	117

== Resurrection ==
French artist K.I.M. launched a compilation in 2004 with the song (Miyage, Tigersushi records), that reached the underground European electro scene. James Murphy later played it in the ParisParis disco club in Paris in 2005.

French director Maïwenn used it the Polisse movie in 2011. It also appeared in season one, episode one of Dear White People in 2017. The song was also featured during the second-season finale episode of Industry.

=== Keedz version ===
"Stand on the Word"

Single by Keedz

from the album Stand on the Word
- Released: 2008
- Genre: Electropop, nu-disco
- Label: Universal Music France
- Songwriter: Phyliss McKoy Joubert
- Producers: Sophie Delila; Julien Jabre; Phyliss McKoy Joubert; David Eugene Joubert

Music video
- "Stand on the Word" on YouTube

The biggest commercial success of the song has been by the French musical project Keedz that recorded it in 2008 and was the title track of their similarly titled album Stand on the Word. The revamped electronic production of the soul and funk song remixed by MiMa made up of Michael Tordjman and Maxime Desprez did not enter the French charts in its initial release in 2008. But it proved to be very popular after Keedz' version of "Stand on the Word" was used as a short introduction to Le Grand Journal broadcast on Canal+ for the week 29 September to 3 October 2008. The French Le Grand Journal picks weekly one particular song (called "coming next") as a jingle to its introduction and changes it on a weekly basis. The choices prove usually to be future hits. The Keedz version of the song was also used in 2008 in an episode of the Australian television series Underbelly.

The single was re-released a second time around in 2011. The single has been in the SNEP French Singles Chart since October 2011 totalling 28 weeks until end of July 2012 and reaching its peak position at #12 on chart dated 23 June 2012. The Keedz release was accompanied by a music video which became equally popular.

Chart (2012)	Peak position
SNEP French singles chart	12

== In popular culture ==
- The song is featured over the end credits of the final episode of Season 4 of FX's Snowfall.
- The song plays over the end credits of the finale of Season 2 of HBO's Industry, and over the ending of the first episode of HBO's The Righteous Gemstones.
