= Keedz =

French musical project

Keedz is a musical project of a group of young French singers who release songs as a choir accompanied by electro-disco-dance influences. In 2008, Keedz released a studio album entitled Stand on the Word containing 11 tracks on Elias Music / Mercury Records / Universal Music. It was produced by Julien Jabre, Jimmy Mikaoui and Laurent Tordjman with David Eugène Joubert and Phyliss McKoy Joubert, with the latter having written 7 of the 11 tracks. The vocals were by formation named The Children of God.

Keedz achieved fame with the big commercial success of the title track "Stand on the Word". The single, remixed by MiMa (made up of Michael Tordjman and Maxime Desprez), was a remake of a Joubert Singers song. Many drew similarities between it and the musical project Justice, particularly their single "D.A.N.C.E.", but this was disputed. The Keedz release was accompanied by a music video which became equally popular. The single has been in the SNEP French Singles Chart since October 2011 totalling 28 weeks until end of July 2012 and reaching its peak position at #12 on chart dated 23 June 2012.

Keedz' version of "Stand on the Word" was used as a short introduction to Le Grand Journal broadcast on Canal+ for the week 29 September to 3 October 2008. Le Grand Journal picks weekly one particular song (called "coming next") as a jingle to its introduction and changes it on a weekly basis. The choices prove usually to be future hits. The Keedz version of the song was also used in 2008 in an episode of the Australian television series Underbelly.

== Discography ==
=== Albums ===
- 2008: Stand on the Word

Track list:

1. "Stand on the Word" (MiMa Version) (3:28)
2. "Stomp" (2:55)
3. "Love is All" (3:29)
4. "Praises" (4:07)
5. "Crazy" (4:07)
6. "Wade in the Water" (3:48)
7. "Destiny" (3:05)
8. "Clap on" (3:22)
9. "World Hold On" (4:00)
10. "Can You Feel It" (4:47)
11. "Stand on the Word 1982" (4:46)

=== Singles ===
Year	Single	Peak position	Certification	Album
Year	Single	FR	Certification	Album
2011/2012	"Stand on the Word"	12		Stand on the Word
