= MDNA (album) =

2012 studio album by Madonna

- Standard edition cover

Studio album by Madonna
- Released: March 23, 2012
- Recorded: 2011
- Studios: Studio at the Palms (Las Vegas, Nevada); Guerilla Strip; Sarm West Studios (London, England); 3:20 Studios (Los Angeles, California); MSR Studios (New York City); Free School (California)
- Genres: Pop; EDM
- Length: 50:47
- Label: Interscope
- Producers: Madonna; Alle Benassi; Benny Benassi; The Demolition Crew; Michael Malih; Hardy "Indiigo" Muanza; William Orbit; Martin Solveig

Madonna chronology
Sticky & Sweet Tour (2010)	MDNA (2012)	The Complete Studio Albums (1983–2008) (2012)

Alternative cover
- Deluxe edition cover

Singles from MDNA
- 1. "Give Me All Your Luvin'" Released: February 3, 2012; 2. "Girl Gone Wild" Released: March 2, 2012; 3. "Turn Up the Radio" Released: June 29, 2012

MDNA is the twelfth studio album by American singer Madonna, released on March 23, 2012, by Interscope Records. The album was conceived while the singer was busy filming her directorial venture, W.E., throughout 2011. Madonna began recording in July 2011 and collaborated with producers including Alle Benassi, Benny Benassi, Demolition Crew, Free School, Michael Malih, Indiigo, William Orbit, and Martin Solveig, with Orbit and Solveig serving as the record's primary producers. The album features guest appearances by female rappers M.I.A. and Nicki Minaj.

The recording process was smooth, although Madonna had difficulty working with Benny Benassi, who did not speak fluent English, and used his cousin Alle Benassi as an interpreter. A pop and EDM album, MDNA consists of upbeat songs whose lyrics explore themes of partying, love for music, and infatuation, as well as heartbreak, revenge, and separation. The album's title is a triple entendre, alluding to DNA, MDMA, and Madonna's name. Its allusion to MDMA drew criticism from an anti-drug group.

MDNA was Madonna's first release under the 360 deal she had signed with Live Nation in 2007 and the three-album deal with Interscope in 2012. The record was promoted through Madonna's performance at the Super Bowl XLVI halftime show and the MDNA Tour, the latter of which became one of the highest-grossing tours of all time. Three singles were released—"Give Me All Your Luvin'", "Girl Gone Wild" and "Turn Up the Radio". Its first single reached number ten on the Billboard Hot 100, extending Madonna's then-record as the artist with the most top-ten singles in the chart's history.

Music critics were ambivalent toward the album. MDNA topped the record charts in many major music markets. Madonna set a new record for the most number-one albums by a solo artist in Australia and the United Kingdom. MDNA was the twelfth best-selling album of 2012 globally, and went on to sell two million copies. Billboard ranked Madonna as the ninth top-charting female artist of the year.

== Background and collaborations ==
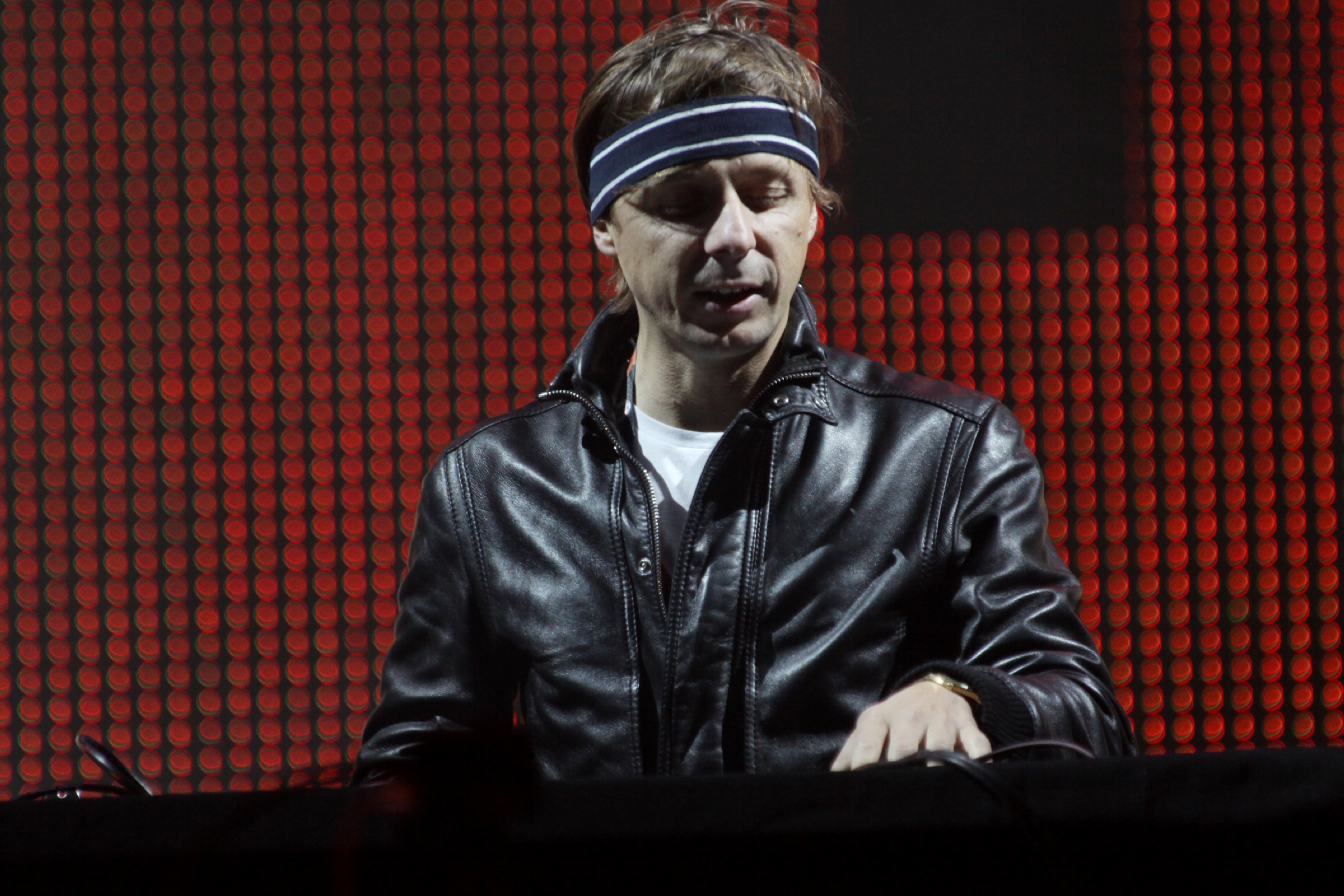
French DJ Martin Solveig wrote and produced six songs on MDNA.

Following the end of her eleventh studio album, Hard Candy (2008), Madonna branched out into different ventures. She released her third greatest-hits album, Celebration (2009), introduced her Material Girl clothing line, opened Hard Candy Fitness centers across the world, and unveiled fashion brand Truth or Dare by Madonna which included perfumes, footwear, underwear, and accessories. She also directed her second feature film, W.E., a biographical piece about the affair between King Edward VIII and Wallis Simpson.

While filming W.E., Madonna posted a message on her Facebook page writing: "Its official! I need to move. I need to sweat. I need to make new music! Music I can dance to. I'm on the lookout for the maddest, sickest, most badass people to collaborate with. I'm just saying." She started working with producer William Orbit, with whom the singer had not collaborated since her eighth studio album, Music (2000). Noting that they shared strong camaraderie, Madonna felt that Orbit would align with her musical choices.

In July 2011, French DJ Martin Solveig was invited for a writing session in London. Madonna originally enlisted Solveig for one song, but they ended up composing six in total: "B-Day Song", "Beautiful Killer", "Give Me All Your Luvin'", "I Don't Give A", "I Fucked Up" and "Turn Up the Radio". In an interview with Billboard, Solveig said that being Madonna's record producer would have been intimidating, so he avoided "thinking about the [singer], and do something that just makes sense". Several other producers joined the album, including Alessandro "Alle" Benassi and his brother Benny Benassi, The Demolition Crew, Michael Malih and Indiigo. Madonna enlisted female rappers Nicki Minaj and M.I.A. because she wanted to collaborate with "women who [...] have a strong sense of themselves". Australian singer Sia also submitted several proposals for the album, but none made the final cut. In 2020, French disc jockey David Guetta claimed that Madonna had been interested in working with him on the album, following the success of his remix to her 2009 single "Revolver". However, after he disclosed his Scorpio star sign, Madonna did not pursue the idea further.

In May 2012, producer William Orbit stated that some of the best tracks from MDNA did not make the final track listing because of timing issues, saying that those "breathtaking" records ended up on Chris Brown's Fortune and Kreayshawn’s Somethin' 'Bout Kreay.

== Recording sessions ==
On July 4, 2011, Madonna's manager Guy Oseary announced that she had begun recording the album. Sessions took place at Sarm West Studios and Guerrilla Strip in London, Studio at the Palms in Las Vegas, MSR Studios in New York, 3:20 Studios in Los Angeles, and Free School in California.

In an interview with Channel V Australia, Solveig recalled that the recording sessions were smooth because of his camaraderie with Madonna. After the three songs were composed, the producer drafted another track called "Beautiful Killer", inspired by the French film Le Samouraï (1967), which he and Madonna both admired. For Madonna, Solveig's "methodical" thinking was important because she could reject ideas during the process without worrying about hurting his feelings. Solveig commented about Madonna's involvement in the production of the album:

She is as involved as you can be in the recording process. This was a very good and big surprise for me! I was assuming that she would spend only an hour or two in the studio per day and come and see where we were and say, "Ok I like this, I don't like that. I'll sing this. Bye!" And absolutely not... I mean we co-produced the track and it's not just written on the credits "co-produced by Martin Solveig and Madonna", we literally co-produced the tracks. I mean, at some point she wanted to choose the sound of a snare drum or a synth and that kind of stuff. She was really in the session!

While working with the Benassis, Madonna faced language barriers because Benny was not fluent in English. She was shy about it but ultimately asked Alle Benassi to serve as an interpreter, which was difficult for all three before they eventually overcame the issue. "With music it's so much about the vibe and the energy and you know when things are working and when they're not," clarified the singer.

== Titling and artwork ==
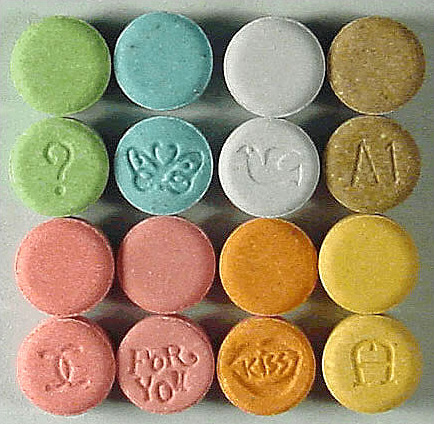
The album's name was a reference to the drug MDMA, commonly known as ecstasy

The album title was announced by Madonna as MDNA during an interview on The Graham Norton Show on January 11, 2012. When discussing the album on The Tonight Show with Jay Leno, Madonna explained that the title is a triple entendre, representing both her name and her DNA, as well as a reference to the drug MDMA, commonly known as ecstasy. During her gig at the Palau Sant Jordi as part of the MDNA Tour, Madonna told her audience: "Do you understand this concept? That we share DNA, regardless of beliefs or sexual orientation...? That we are all one?". Lucy Dawe, a spokesperson for the anti-drug campaign group Cannabis Skunk Sense, called the title "ill-advised".

The record's artwork was shot by Mert and Marcus and directed by Giovanni Bianco. The deluxe edition cover was unveiled on Madonna's official Facebook page on January 31, 2012. Jocelyn Vena of MTV News described the image as a "glamorous, deconstructed photograph" where Madonna "cocks her head up, her curly hair pulled back. She's wearing lots of mascara, bright red lipstick, a choker and a silky bright pink top. The photo has some kind of broken mirror filter over it, giving it a funky, dance-queen vibe." Robbie Daw of Idolator compared the artwork to the singer's third studio album cover, True Blue (1986), with similarity in Madonna's blond locks and the tilting of her head. The standard edition cover was revealed on February 6, 2012. Its art direction used the same color palette and distorted appearance as the deluxe edition image, but featured a full-body shot of Madonna in a red dress, gloves, and jewelry.

== Music and lyrics ==
MDNA is predominantly a pop and EDM album, which can be divided into two categories: "introspective" tracks created with Orbit, and "more ironic and funny and upbeat" tunes with Solveig. Christopher Rosa of Glamour noticed that although the album did not reference her ex-husband Guy Ritchie, he was a direct inspiration for the songwriting after their 2008 divorce. Thematically, it explored the different facets of a post-divorce scenario, from somber mourning to releasing one's inhibitions after being suppressed in marriage, as well as anger and disdain. The album opens with the track "Girl Gone Wild", which contains influences of four on the floor and sounds similar to songs from Madonna's tenth studio album, Confessions on a Dance Floor (2005). Its introduction includes elements of "Act of Contrition" from her fourth studio album, Like a Prayer (1989), while the chorus speaks of "a girl gone wild" with "burning desire". The next song, "Gang Bang", is an EDM track with a dubstep breakdown and industrial beats. The lyrics describe a woman taking revenge on her lover by shooting him in the head.

"Give Me All Your Luvin'"
A 20-second sample of "Give Me All Your Luvin'" which illustrates Madonna singing the chorus, which is backed by Nicki Minaj and M.I.A. with the cheerleading chant "L-U-V Madonna, Y-O-U You wanna."

In "I'm Addicted", Madonna compares her infatuation with a person to narcotic addiction, singing over a beat consisting of electro house and eurodance music. Fourth track "Turn Up the Radio" begins with a keyboard sequence before turning into a 1980s-inspired dance-pop number. Lyrically, it urges the audience to relax while listening to music. "Give Me All Your Luvin'" had elements of bubblegum pop, synthpop, new wave and disco. The track features cheerleading chants between the verses while Minaj and M.I.A. rap during the intermediate section. The dance song "Some Girls" was inspired by hardstyle, and Madonna lists different types of girls. "Superstar" has backing vocals from her daughter Lourdes. A dance-pop song with a dubstep hook and influences of electronica, the lyrics find Madonna comparing her lover to famous men including John Travolta, Abraham Lincoln and Al Capone, while she claims to be their "biggest fan".

"I Don't Give A" contains industrial beats and hip-hop influences, and lyrically addresses Madonna's daily life while responding to her critics. Minaj's guest rapping verse praises the singer, "There is only one queen, and that's Madonna, bitch" and references Madonna's "Material Girl". A 1960s-inspired mix of rock and roll and country music forms the backbone of "I'm a Sinner", with Madonna naming different saints and their virtues, and calling herself a transgressor. "Love Spent" has a contrasting composition from banjo and electronic music, creating a "refreshing, contemporary, radio-friendly pop sound". The song discusses how money was a triggering factor in ending Madonna's marriage. The overall tempo on MDNA slows down with the next two songs. "Masterpiece", which was also included in the soundtrack of W.E., is a ballad with traces of Latin music. The song has instrumentation from strings, guitars and percussion, and speaks about the pain of being in love with someone perfect. The standard version of the album ended with "Falling Free", a ballad with a simple melody on a bassline, and complex lyrics that highlighted love, freedom and exaltation.

The deluxe version of MDNA includes "I Fucked Up", a slow-paced song whose lyrics find Madonna admitting the reasons her marriage failed. The concept song "Beautiful Killer" has a string arrangement reminiscent of Madonna's 1986 single "Papa Don't Preach". The singer portrays the point of view of a victim and a murderer. "B-Day Song" is a "goof off" tune featuring M.I.A., with a punk style bassline and percussion. According to Jon Pareles, Madonna laments the loss of a lover in the closing song "Best Friend", and admits to feeling guilty and remorseful in the "haunting slow jam".

== Release and promotion ==
In December 2011, Oseary and Live Nation Entertainment announced that they had developed a long-term plan for Madonna through which she was booked for a three-album contract with Interscope Records. It was the beginning of the 360 deal which the singer had signed with Live Nation in 2007, and included "new studio albums, touring, merchandising, fan club/website, DVDs, music-related television and film projects and associated sponsorship agreements". MDNA's release date was confirmed as March 23, 2012, in Australia and Germany, and March 26 in other markets, including the United States. It was Madonna's third studio album to bear the Parental Advisory label after Erotica (1992) and American Life (2003), due to the profanity used in tracks such as "Gang Bang". In a 2011 year-end readers poll by Billboard, it was voted as the most anticipated album of 2012. An edited version of the standard edition of the album was made widely available, which completely omits the track "Gang Bang". An edited version of the deluxe edition was also released, which included an additional remix of "Give Me All Your Luvin'". The edited version of the deluxe edition was exclusively available at Wal-Mart stores in the US.

In January 2026, Madonna added an acoustic version of "Love Spent" to the digital deluxe version of the album.

=== Super Bowl ===
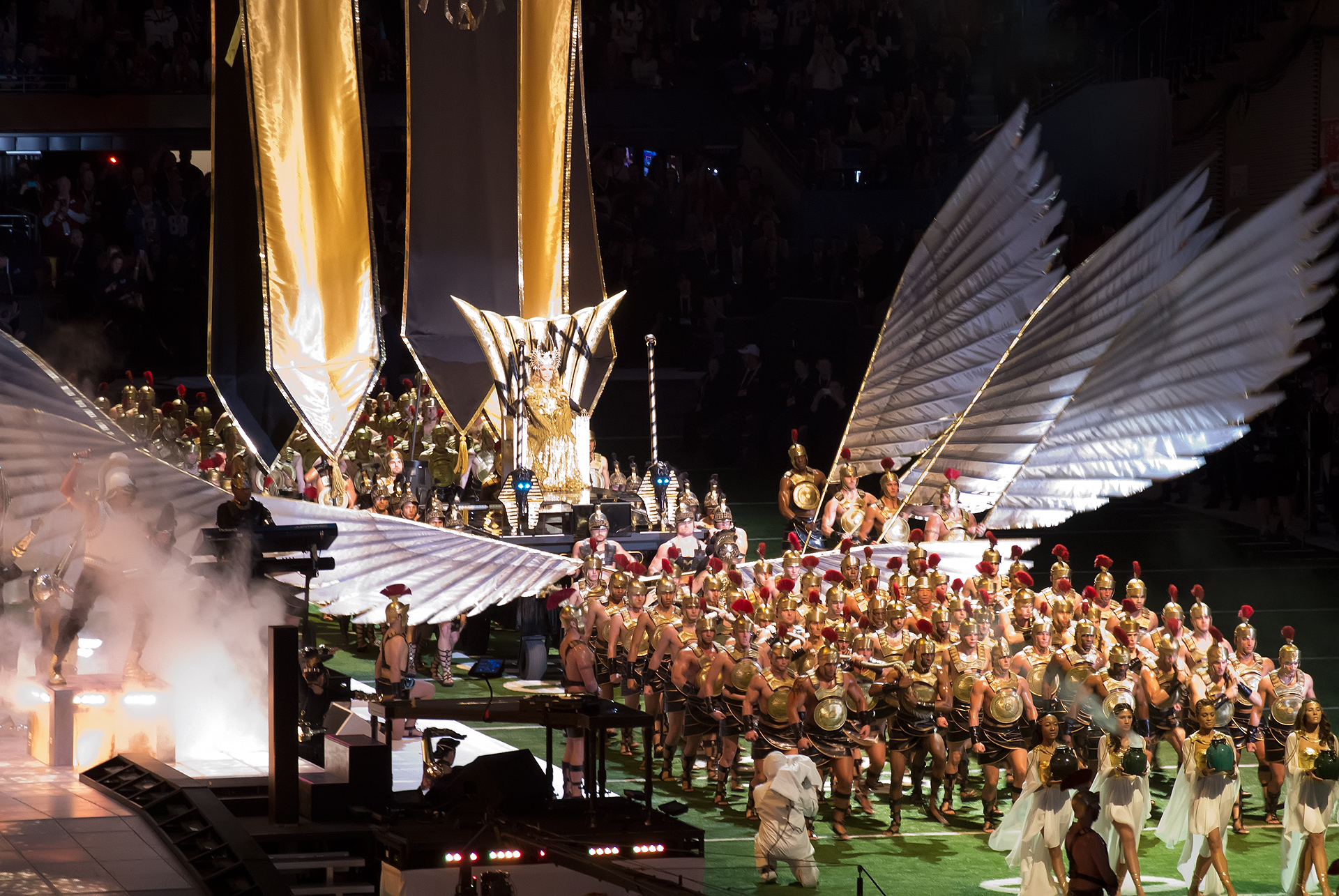
Madonna appearing onstage during the halftime show

The promotional activities for MDNA began with Madonna performing at the Super Bowl XLVI halftime show on February 5, 2012, at Lucas Oil Stadium in Indianapolis, Indiana. The show was conceptualized by Cirque Du Soleil and Madonna's longtime collaborator Jamie King, along with visual media group Moment Factory enlisted. The performance featured 17 dancers, 20 dancing dolls, a 200-member church choir, and a drum line consisting of 100 percussionists. A total of 36 image projectors were used for the lighting and visuals. The show began with Madonna being carried into the stadium by 150 bearers. She performed "Give Me All Your Luvin'" with Minaj and M.I.A. on the show, along with her past hits—"Vogue", "Music" and "Like a Prayer". Once the show concluded, a group of 250 volunteers dismantled the stage in six minutes.

Madonna was not paid for performing at the halftime show, which provided global exposure for an artist. The show was a success, setting a Super Bowl halftime-show record of 114 million viewers (higher than the viewership of the game itself). Keith Caulfield of Billboard reported a 17-fold sales increase for Madonna's back catalog and strong preorder sales for MDNA (about 50,000 copies ordered at the iTunes Store). However, the performance faced criticism when M.I.A. extended her middle finger to the camera near the end of her verse during "Give Me All Your Luvin'", in place of the word "shit". The rapper was penalized, and the NFL apologized for its inability to blur out the image during the broadcast.

=== Singles ===
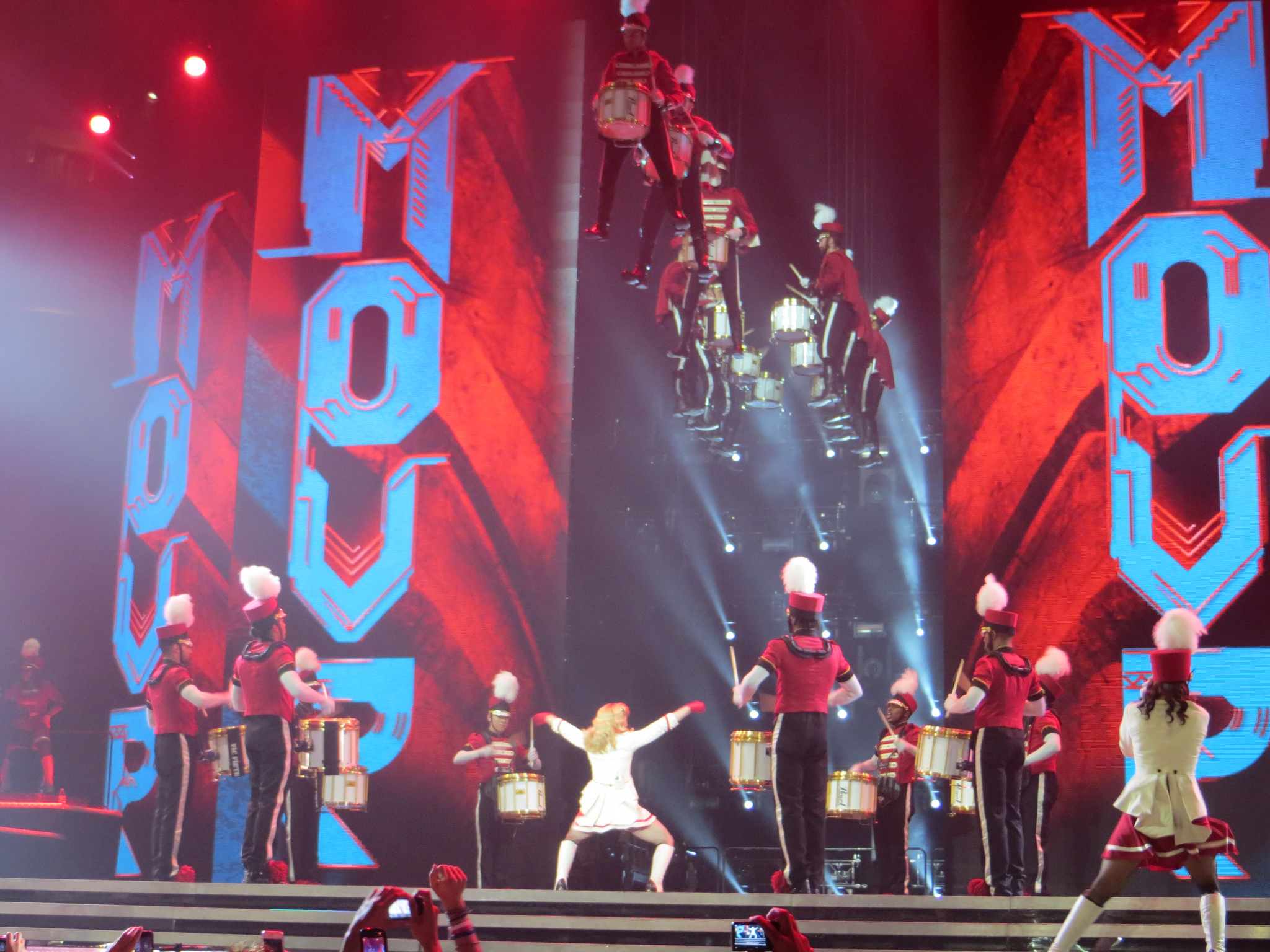
The performance of lead single "Give Me All Your Luvin'" during the MDNA Tour, which went on to become one of the highest-grossing concert tours of all time.

"Give Me All Your Luvin'" was released as the first single from the album on February 3, 2012. Sal Cinquemani from Slant Magazine complimented the "catchy" melodies, but declared the composition inferior to Madonna's previous singles. Other reviewers, including Alexis Petridis from The Guardian considered the track a weak lead single, and Joey Guerra from Houston Chronicle wrote that it was not a proper representation of the album. The song topped the charts in Canada, Finland, Hungary and Venezuela. It became Madonna's 38th top-ten hit on the Billboard Hot 100, extending her record as the artist with the most top-ten singles in the chart's history.

The album's second single, "Girl Gone Wild", was released as a digital download on March 2, 2012. The black-and-white music video for the song was directed by fashion photographers Mert and Marcus. "Girl Gone Wild" debuted at number six on the Billboard Bubbling Under Hot 100 Singles chart with 22,000 downloads sold. It reached the top of the Dance Club Songs chart, giving Madonna a record 73rd week atop the ranking.

"Masterpiece" was officially sent to radio stations in the United Kingdom on April 2, 2012. The song performed best in Russia, where it topped the Russian Music Charts for the week of December 2, 2012.

"Turn Up the Radio" was released as the fourth and final single from the album, on June 29, 2012, in Italy. It became the third single from MDNA to top the US dance charts.

In Brazil, "Superstar" was released on December 3, 2012, as a promotional single, as a special edition CD with Brazilian newspaper Folha de S. Paulo. The accompanying cover art was created by Brazilian graffiti artist Simone Sapienza, who won a contest sponsored by Johnnie Walker's Keep Walking Project in Brazil; she was chosen by Madonna from ten finalists.

=== Media ===
Following her performance at the Super Bowl, Madonna gave the album limited promotion, with Oseary citing the MDNA Tour rehearsals as the reason. Orbit expressed his displeasure about the scarcity of promotion, recalling that they had little time to record MDNA because Madonna's schedule was full of other commitments, such as "perfume launch and teen fashion contests". He also blamed the "rush marketing" and the timing of the record's release for the lack of promotion.

Madonna instead used social media to promote MDNA, by posting minute-long snippets of several album tracks, behind-the-scenes pictures of tour rehearsals, and online polls asking her fans regarding tour set list. On March 24 she participated in a livestream chat on Facebook, which was hosted by Jimmy Fallon. To boost the album streams Madonna partnered with Spotify, and launched an opportunity for its listeners to win two tickets for the MDNA Tour. For eligibility, users had to stream the album thrice on Spotify within two weeks of release. She later made a brief appearance on Ultra Music Festival in Miami a few days later, where she introduced Swedish DJ Avicii who played his remix of "Girl Gone Wild". At one point the singer asked the audience, "How many people in this crowd have seen Molly?" The statement was met with criticism, with producer Deadmau5 condemning her use of the word molly, which is a slang for MDMA. Madonna responded on Twitter by posting a 1989 picture of herself, wearing Minnie Mouse ears, and a comment: "From one mouse to another. I don't support drug use and I never have. I was referring to the song called 'Have You Seen Molly' written by my friend Cedric Gervais who I almost worked with on [MDNA]."

=== Tour ===
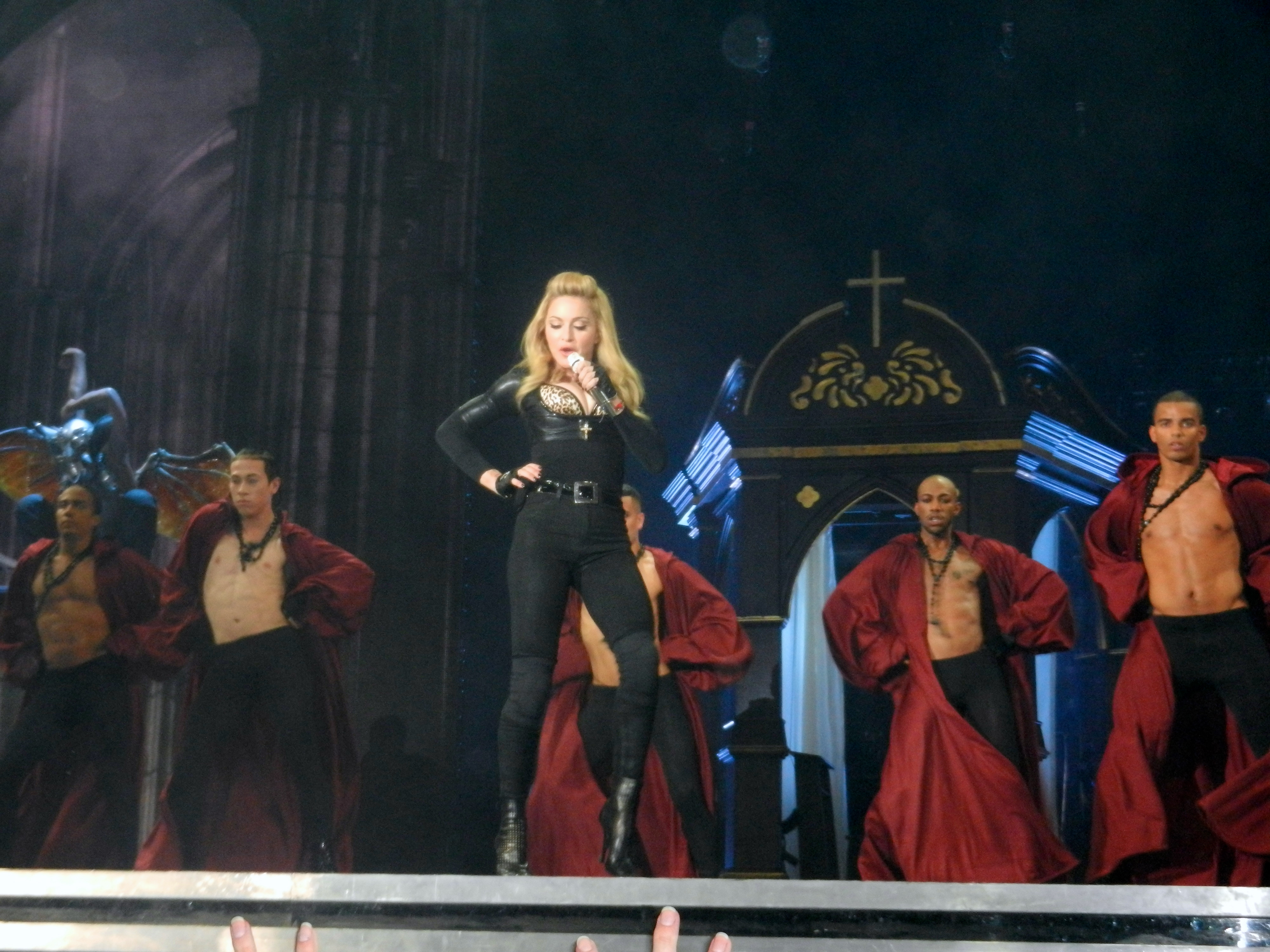
Madonna opening the MDNA Tour with a performance of "Girl Gone Wild", MDNA's second single.

Following the Super Bowl performance, Madonna announced the MDNA Tour which started in May 2012 at Tel Aviv, Israel and ended in South America in December 2012. The tour played in different venues like stadiums and arenas, as well as outdoor locations like the Plains of Abraham in Quebec. After visiting 26 markets in Europe, the tour returned to North America, where it remained until Thanksgiving 2012, and then moved South America. Like her previous few tours, Madonna canceled plans of visiting Australia and apologized for it. The tour was described by the singer as "a journey of a soul from darkness to light". It was divided into four sections: Transgression, Prophecy, Masculine/Feminine and Redemption. The triangle-shaped stage consisted of two walkways for Madonna to wade into the crowd and an enclosed area where fans could get closer. Designers working on the tour's wardrobe included Jean Paul Gaultier, Arianne Phillips and Givenchy's Riccardo Tisci.

The tour portrayed controversial subjects such as violence, firearms, human rights, nudity, and politics. During one sequence the face of French far right politician Marine Le Pen appeared on the screen with a swastika on her forehead. Other segments showed the singer attacking dancers with fake guns, blood spattering on the backdrop screens, mooning, and briefly exposing her breasts to the audience. Despite the controversies, the MDNA Tour received positive reviews and became the highest-grossing tour of 2012 and was at that time the tenth highest-grossing tour of all time, grossing $305.1 million in ticket sales from 88 sold-out performances, watched by an audience of 2.21 million. The Miami shows on November 19–20, 2012 were recorded and released as a live album.

== Critical reception ==
Professional ratings
Aggregate scores
Source	Rating
AnyDecentMusic?	5.6/10
Metacritic	64/100
Review scores
Source	Rating
AllMusic	3.5/5 stars
Robert Christgau	A−
Entertainment Weekly	B−
The Guardian	3/5 stars
Los Angeles Times	2/4 stars
Pitchfork	4.5/10
Q	4/5 stars
Rolling Stone	3.5/5 stars
Slant Magazine	3.5/5 stars
Spin	7/10

Upon its release, reviews ranged from favorable to mixed. At Metacritic, which assigns a normalized rating out of 100 to reviews from mainstream critics, MDNA received an average score of 64, based on 34 reviews, which indicates "generally favorable reviews". Andy Gill from The Independent felt that the record represented a "determined, no-nonsense restatement" of Madonna's brand of music, after the underwhelming response she had received for Hard Candy. Rolling Stone writer Joe Levy rated the release 3.5 out of 5 stars, describing it as a "disco-fied divorce record". He described the music composition as suggestive, but found depth in the content after repeated listening. Priya Elan of NME called MDNA as "a ridiculously enjoyable romp" while finding that lyrically they were the most intimate songwriting that Madonna had ever done. Slant Magazine's Sal Cinquemani found the album to be "surprisingly cohesive" in spite of the multiple producers, and commended Madonna and Orbit's compositions as among the best. Shirley Halperin from Billboard felt that Madonna was correct in not creating retro sounding music like her peers and believed that the singer's intuition in knowing what's popular in the musical landscape was beneficial for the album since EDM was becoming popular at that time. Also from Billboard, Joel Lynch opined that "while it didn't quite seem to resonate emotionally with fans upon its release, it certainly has its moments".

Nick Levine, from BBC News, pointed out that "there's no denying MDNA delivers thrills [...] but also has something the last two Madge albums lacked: ballads, both of which are quite lovely". He concluded his review by saying that "[MDNA] isn't just a good pop album, it's a good Madonna album too". Orbit's production received positive feedback from critics. Simon Goddard of Q listed MDNA as Madonna's best album since Ray of Light (1998), as did Chicago Tribune reviewer Greg Kot, who felt that the singer outdid on the Orbit-produced tracks. Caryn Ganz from Spin rated the album 7 out of 10 and said that "if there's one producer who knows how to pluck Madonna's heartstrings, it's Orbit". Writing for The New York Times, Jon Pareles summarized that it was Madonna's "pop instinct" and ability to craft hooks that helped the record become a success musically. In his consumer guide review, critic Robert Christgau gave the album an A− rating. He preferred an alternate track list of the record, highlighting the first 10 track as "updated 90s arena-dance power tracks". According to Jennifer Gannon, from Irish website State, "what MDNA offers is the ideal that pop doesn't always have to be the newest, craziest thing to be effective; it doesn't have to deny the past to be relevant".

Mixed reception came from AllMusic editor Stephen Thomas Erlewine, who described MDNA as "flinty" and "excessively lean" as a result of "cool calculations" used to develop the music and cater to the contemporary music market. Melissa Maerz of Entertainment Weekly found "all those reminders of her work ethic [in the song 'I Don't Give A' as] exhausting". Emily Mackay of The Quietus noted a "lack of ambition" and accused Madonna of "playing it safe" on MDNA. The Observer's Gareth Grundy was ambivalent toward the record's "clumsy rave-pop" tracks, feeling that "the more relaxed, less stentorian tracks sparkle". He opined that the second half of the release "sounds as if it's been borrowed from an entirely different and much better project". Alexis Petridis of The Guardian viewed the album as "neither triumph nor disaster", writing that it "turns out to be just another Madonna album". Similarly, Instinct's Samuel Murrian concluded that "there is no such thing as a bad Madonna album; MDNA, though, is the closest thing there is to a lifeless one". Graham Gremore from Queerty felt that, "had it been released by another pop artist — perhaps someone younger and less established — it may have fared better. But coming from an icon like Madonna, it was, put simply, a disappointment". From The National, Saeed Saeed deemed MDNA "one of the rare times Madonna sounded like a follower rather than a leader", further adding: "While ebullient tracks like 'I'm Addicted' and 'Girl Gone Wild' were club bangers, there is a deflating feeling [she] was trying to be cool with a younger generation".

Helen Brown of The Daily Telegraph criticized the songwriting for being "horribly clichéd", and Madonna's constant need to look and sound "like a teenager" in the tracks. Pitchfork's Matthew Perpetua found most of the record "shockingly banal" and "particularly hollow, the dead-eyed result of obligations, deadlines, and hedged bets". Maura Johnston of The Village Voice criticized Madonna's vocals and her incorporation of EDM as insincere. Los Angeles Times writer Randall Roberts felt that the composition suffers from "familiarity" and MDNA was evidence that Madonna's music had become regressive. The Evening Standard's El Hunt wrote: "[MDNA] is just not very good, and tries far too hard to conjure up an aura of rebellion and naughtiness. [...] barely distinguishable from the pulsing brand of dance-pop also peddled by Katy Perry and Kesha during that same era [...] is just too fragile sounding; even when the chorus hooks are looming and huge, they still sound strangely brittle and impersonal". Genevieve Koski from The A.V. Club criticized its "electronically manipulated" vocals and "big, generic Euro-dance beats", calling MDNA "competent, but equally perfunctory". Wiriting for Turkish newspaper Radikal, Yazi Boyutu called it a "parody of the real Madonna [...] an unnecessary and ridiculous dance album". The Advocate gave a scathing review: "Lacking a central image or theme, MDNA instead relied on uninspiring beats and silly references to guns and partying. Singles like 'Give Me All Your Luvin' and 'Girl Gone Wild' were so vapid, they made Taylor Swift songs look like cuts from a Joni Mitchell album. Almost instantly forgettable". The Sydney Morning Herald's Bernard Zuel panned the album as "cold, stale and depressingly ordinary".

== Commercial performance ==
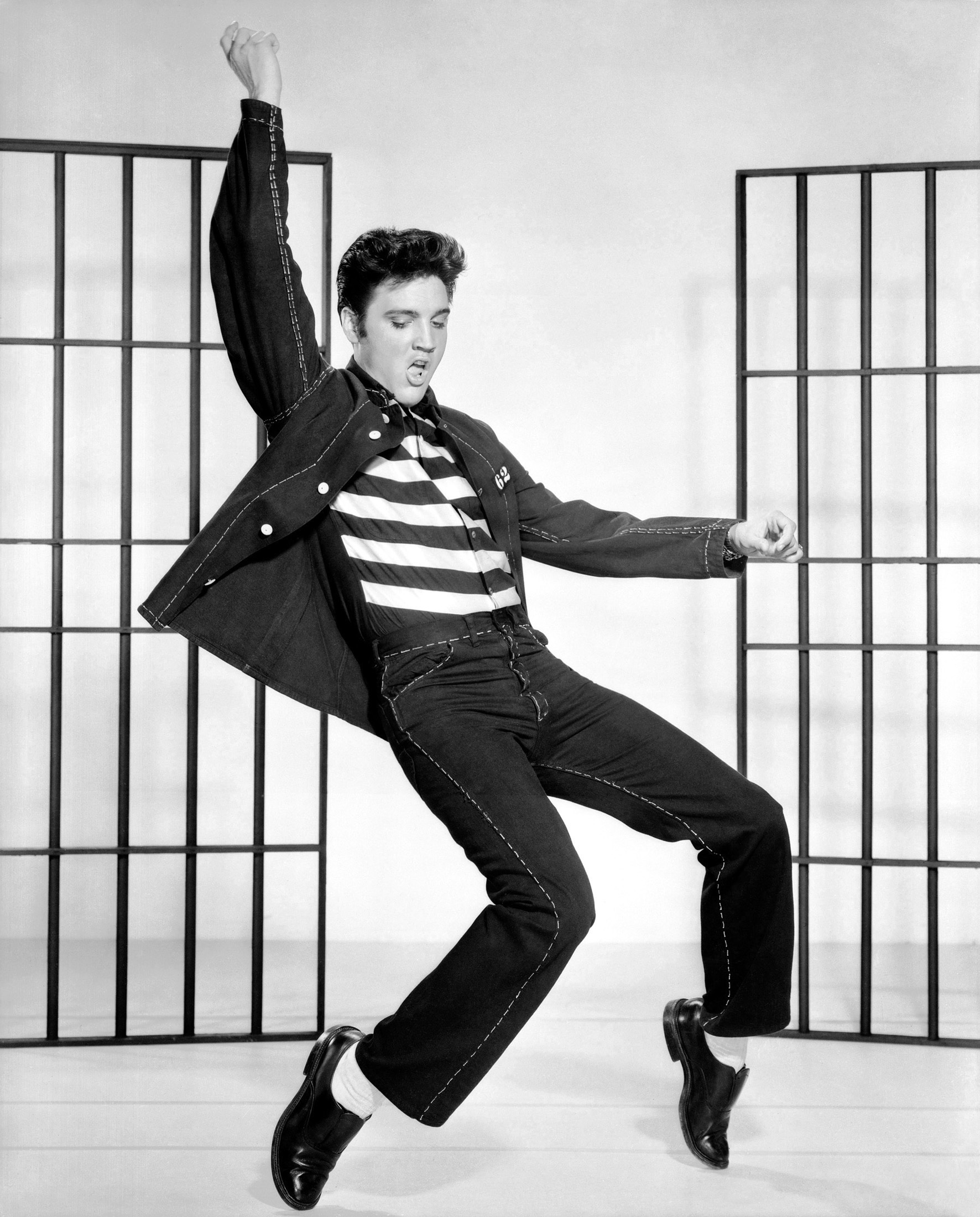
In the United Kingdom, Madonna surpassed Elvis Presley as the solo artist with the most number-one albums at that time

MDNA received the largest number of album pre-orders on the iTunes Store since it was announced in February 2012. According to the International Federation of the Phonographic Industry (IFPI), MDNA was the twelfth best-selling album of 2012 globally with sales of 1.8 million copies. As of March 2014, it has sold over two million copies worldwide.

In the United States, the album debuted at number one on the Billboard 200 with 359,000 copies sold, making it Madonna's biggest first-week sales since Music (2000). It became Madonna's eighth chart-topper and her fifth consecutive studio album to debut at number one. The album's sales were aided by her tour audience, who had the option to receive the release as part of their ticket purchase. Around 185,000 copies of the first-week sales reportedly came from the album-ticket bundling. The next week, the album descended to number eight with sales of 48,000 copies or 86.7% decline, making it the then-largest second-week percentage sales drop for a number-one debuting album of the Nielsen SoundScan era. The album was present on the Billboard 200 for a total of 13 weeks and was certified gold by the Recording Industry Association of America (RIAA), for shipment of 500,000 copies. As of February 2015, it had sold 539,000 copies in the United States. In Canada, MDNA debuted at number one on the Canadian Albums Chart, selling 32,000 copies in its first week. The album also debuted at number one in Brazil and was certified double platinum by the Associação Brasileira dos Produtores de Discos (ABPD) for sales of 80,000 copies.

In Australia, the album debuted at number one and was certified gold by the Australian Recording Industry Association (ARIA) for shipments of 35,000 copies during its first week. It became Madonna's tenth chart-topping album in Australia, making her the solo artist with the most number-one albums of all time, surpassing Jimmy Barnes, and placed behind only the Beatles with 14 and U2 with 11. In Japan, MDNA debuted at number four on the Oricon Albums Chart with first-week sales of 31,000 physical units. In the same week, her Warner Bros.-released box set, The Complete Studio Albums (1983–2008), also debuted at number nine, making Madonna the first international female artist in Japanese chart history to have two albums in the top ten. With those two releases, Madonna accumulated 22 top-ten albums in Japan, more than any other international artist. MDNA was certified gold by the Recording Industry Association of Japan (RIAJ) for shipments of 100,000 units. Madonna also set a record for a foreign album in Turkey as MDNA sold over 30,000 copies within four days, outselling all Turkish domestic albums.

In the United Kingdom, the album debuted at the top of the UK Albums Chart with first-week sales of 56,335 copies. It became Madonna's 12th album to top the chart, breaking the record previously held by Elvis Presley, as the solo artist with the most number-one albums ever. Up to that point, only the Beatles had more number-one albums in British chart history, with 15. Presley reclaimed that record with his posthumous compilation album, The Wonder of You (2016). In February 2025, Taylor Swift broke Madonna's record as the female artist with the highest amount of number ones on the chart, with Lover (Live from Paris) (2019). MDNA stayed in the top ten for two weeks before descending the chart. As of March 2015, the album had sold 134,803 copies in the country, being certified gold by the British Phonographic Industry (BPI). In Russia, the album debuted atop the chart with 26,000 sold. After two weeks, the album accumulated sales of over 50,000 units there and 1.5 million streams, and was later certified seven-times platinum equivalent for sales of 70,000 copies. Across Europe, the album reached the top of the charts in Belgium, Croatia, Czech Republic, Finland, Hungary, Ireland, Italy, Poland, Spain and Sweden, and the top ten in other nations.

== Recognition ==
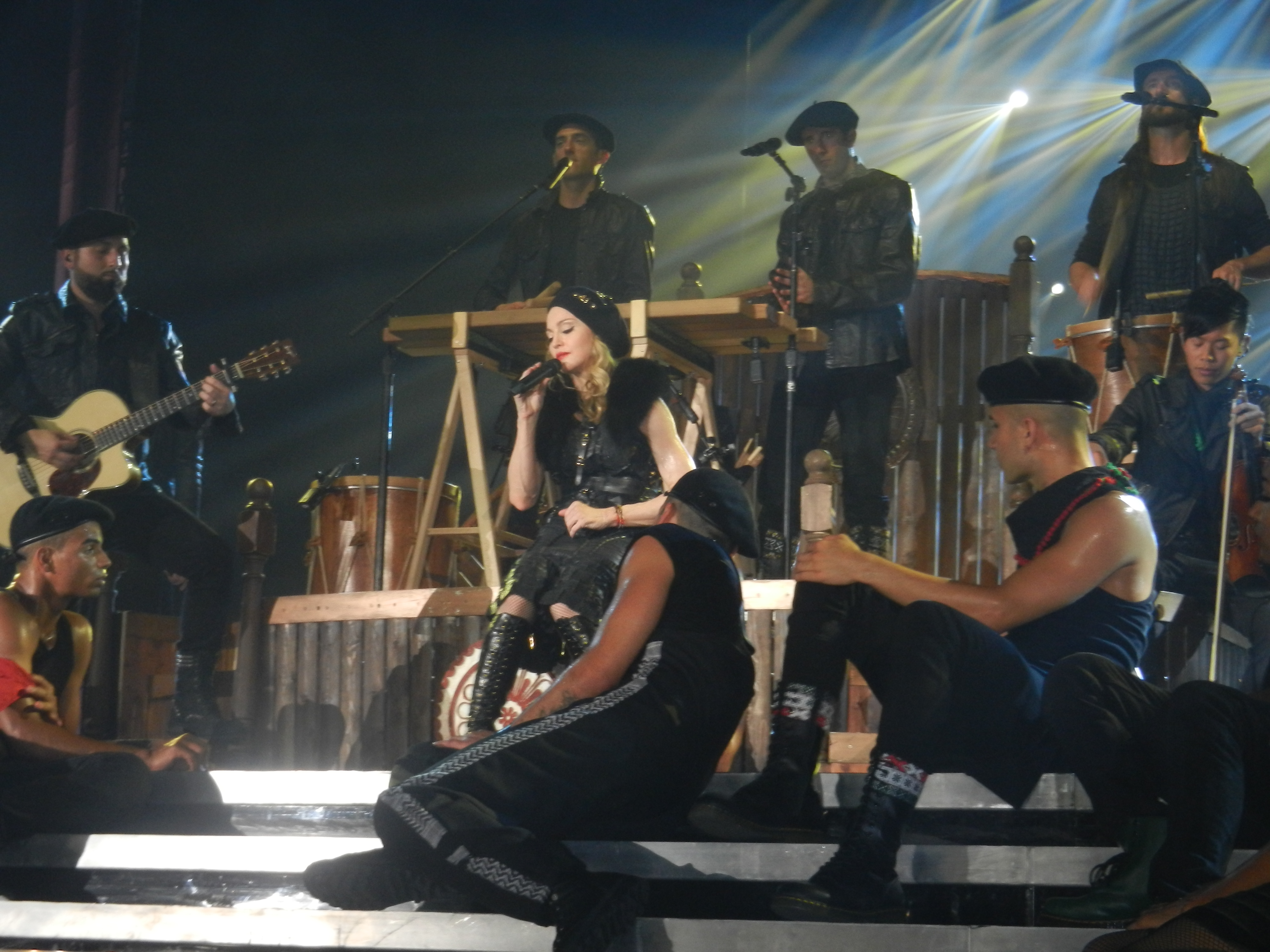
Madonna performing "Masterpiece" on the MDNA Tour. It won the Golden Globe for Best Original Song.

At the 69th Golden Globe Awards, "Masterpiece" won the Golden Globe Award for Best Original Song. The track was also sent to be shortlisted at the 84th Academy Awards, in the category of Best Original Song, but was not considered since a song is eligible only if it appears in a film no later than the start of the final credits and "Masterpiece" is played after more than one minute into the credits. MDNA won the category of Top Dance Album at the 2013 Billboard Music Awards, where Madonna was also honored with the Top Touring Artist and Top Dance Artist trophies. On the 2012 Billboard Year-End charts, Madonna was listed as the ninth top-charting female artist of the year. At the 2014 World Music Awards, the album was nominated for Best World Album, but did not win the award.

With MDNA reaching number one on the UK Albums Chart, Madonna was listed in the Guinness World Records for this achievement. Spin magazine listed MDNA as one of their 20 Best Pop Albums of 2012, where writer Carolina Guerra wrote: "If you can't hear Madge winking her way through EDM stunners 'Girl Gone Wild' and 'Some Girls', or retro bouncers 'Give Me All Your Luvin'' and 'I'm a Sinner' you're letting your assumptions about the Queen's reign speak louder than her still-solid studio work." A later review in 2018 by Christopher Rosa of Glamour called MDNA as the "Ultimate Divorce Album", explaining that within the album there lies "catharsis", and how Madonna's divorce had led to "an amalgamation of feeling: elation, betrayal, depression, numbness, fury—the list goes on and on. Madonna hits all of those points on MDNA and then some. Truthfully, you'll finish the album with emotional whiplash, but isn't that divorce? Isn't that life?"

== Track listing ==
Standard edition
No.	Title	Writer(s)	Producer(s)	Length
1.	"Girl Gone Wild"	Madonna; Jenson Vaughan; Alle Benassi; Benny Benassi	Madonna; Benny Benassi; Alle Benassi	3:43
2.	"Gang Bang^{[d]}"	Madonna; William Orbit; Priscilla Hamilton; Keith Harris; Jean-Baptiste; Mika; Don Juan Demacio "Demo" Casanova; Stephen Kozmeniuk	Madonna; Orbit; The Demolition Crew	5:26
3.	"I'm Addicted"	Madonna; A. Benassi; M. Benassi	Madonna; B. Benassi; A. Benassi; The Demolition Crew^{[a]}	4:33
4.	"Turn Up the Radio"	Madonna; Martin Solveig; Michael Tordjman; Jade Williams	Madonna; Solveig	3:46
5.	"Give Me All Your Luvin'" (featuring Nicki Minaj and M.I.A.)	Madonna; Solveig; Onika Maraj; Maya Arulpragasam; Tordjman	Madonna; Solveig	3:22
6.	"Some Girls"	Madonna; Orbit; Klas Åhlund	Madonna; Orbit; Åhlund^{[a]}	3:53
7.	"Superstar^{[e]}"	Madonna; Hardy "Indiigo" Muanza; Michael Malih	Madonna; Muanza; Malih	3:55
8.	"I Don't Give A" (featuring Nicki Minaj)	Madonna; Solveig; Maraj; Julien Jabre	Madonna; Solveig	4:19
9.	"I'm a Sinner"	Madonna; Orbit; Jean-Baptiste	Madonna; Orbit	4:52
10.	"Love Spent"	Madonna; Orbit; Jean-Baptiste; Hamilton; Alain Whyte; Ryan Buendia; Michael McHenry	Madonna; Orbit; Free School^{[a]}	3:46
11.	"Masterpiece"	Madonna; Julie Frost; Jimmy Harry	Madonna; Orbit; Harry^{[b]}	3:59
12.	"Falling Free"	Madonna; Laurie Mayer; Orbit; Joe Henry	Madonna; Orbit	5:13
Total length:				50:47

Deluxe edition
No.	Title	Writer(s)	Producer(s)	Length
13.	"Beautiful Killer"	Madonna; Solveig; Tordjman	Madonna; Solveig	3:49
14.	"I Fucked Up"	Madonna; Solveig; Jabre	Madonna; Solveig	3:29
15.	"B-Day Song" (featuring M.I.A.)	Madonna; Arulpragasam; Solveig	Madonna; Solveig	3:33
16.	"Best Friend"	Madonna; A. Benassi; M. Benassi	Madonna; The Demolition Crew; B. Benassi^{[a]}; A. Benassi^{[a]}	3:20
17.	"Love Spent" (Acoustic)	Madonna; Orbit; Jean-Baptiste; Hamilton; Alain Whyte; Ryan Buendia; Michael McHenry	Madonna; Orbit; Free School^{[a]}	4:24
18.	"Masterpiece" (Kid Capri's Remix)	Madonna; Julie Frost; Jimmy Harry	Madonna; Orbit; Harry^{[b]}	3:57
Total length:				73:32

=== Notes ===
- ^{^[a]} signifies a co-producer
- ^{^[b]} signifies an additional producer
- ^{^[c]} signifies a remixer and additional producer
- ^{^[d]} The clean version of the album does not include "Gang Bang".
- ^{^[e]} "Superstar" contains uncredited vocals from Madonna's daughter, Lourdes Leon.
- Deluxe edition was initially featuring the Party Rock Remix of "Give Me All Your Luvin'" featuring LMFAO and Nicki Minaj as track 17. In 2026 the remix got replaced with track 17 and 18.
- iTunes Store pre-order included track 17.
- Spotify edition includes the Dave Audé Wild Dub version of "Girl Gone Wild".
- Nightlife Edition consists of previously released MDNA tracks and multiple remix versions of "Give Me All Your Luvin’", "Turn Up the Radio", and "Masterpiece" with the Spotify edition containing a shorter track list with only remix tracks.
- Taiwan, Philippines and Thailand limited slipcase includes the bonus CD single no rap version of "Give Me All Your Luvin'".

== Personnel ==
Credits adapted from the album's liner notes.

=== Production ===
- Madonna – songwriter, producer, executive producer, vocals, acoustic guitar
- William Orbit – songwriter, producer, instrumentation, orchestra arrangement, orchestration
- Martin Solveig – songwriter, producer, synths, drums, instruments, additional synths, additional drums
- Klas Åhlund – songwriter, co-producer, instrumentation, original vocoder
- Maya Arulpragasam – songwriter, vocals
- Jean-Baptiste – songwriter, additional vocals
- Elena Barere – concertmaster
- Alle Benassi – songwriter, producer, co-producer
- Benny Benassi – songwriter, producer, co-producer
- Lise Berthaud – viola
- Jade Williams – songwriter
- Don Juan Demo Casanova – songwriter
- Julie Frost – songwriter
- Priscilla Hamilton – songwriter
- Keith Harris – songwriter
- Jimmy Harry – songwriter, additional producer
- Joe Henry – songwriter
- Nicki Minaj – songwriter, vocals
- Indiigo – songwriter, producer
- Ryan Buendia – songwriter, instrumentation
- Julien Jabre – songwriter, electric guitars, drums, synths
- Stephen Kozmeniuk – songwriter
- Michael Malih – songwriter, producer
- Michael McHenry – songwriter
- Mika – songwriter
- Laurie Mayer – songwriter
- Andros Rodriguez – engineer
- Michael Tordjman – songwriter, synths, guitars
- Jenson Vaughan – songwriter
- Alain Whyte – songwriter, instrumentation
- The Demolition Crew – producer, co-producer

=== Musicians ===
- Graham Archer – recording
- Quentin Belarbi – assistant engineer
- Hahn-Bin – violin
- Diane Barere – celli
- David Braccini – violin
- Christophe Briquet – viola, musicians contractor
- Karen Brunon – violin
- Bob Carlisle – French horn
- Jeff Carney – bass
- Demo Castellon – mixing, recording, drums, bass, engineering
- Cecile Coutelier – live strings recording assistant
- David Eggert – dancing
- Stephanie Cummins – celli
- Barbara Currie – French horn
- Jason Metal Donkersgoed – additional editing, additional recording
- Desiree Elsevier – violin
- Romain Faure – additional synths
- Frank Filipetti – engineering
- Akemi Fillon – violin
- Pierre Fouchenneret – violin
- Free School – co-producer
- Jean-Baptiste Gaudray – guitar
- Chris Gehringer – mastering
- Anne Gravoin – violin
- Mary Hammann – violin
- Gloria Kaba – assistant engineer
- Ian Kagey – assistant engineer
- Rob Katz – assistant engineer
- Abel Korzeniowski – conductor
- The Koz – editing, vocoder, keyboard, synths, additional programing, additional editing
- Paul Kremen – marketing
- Raphael Lee – assistant engineer
- Brad Leigh – assistant engineer
- Lola Leon – background vocals
- Diane Lesser – English horn
- Vincent Lionti – violins
- LMFAO – remix, additional producer
- Brett Mayer – assistant engineer
- Nelson Milburn – assistant engineer
- Christophe Morin – cello
- Sarah Nemtanu – violin
- Jessica Phillips – clarinet
- Stephane Reichart – live strings recording
- Miwa Rosso – cello
- Dov Scheindlin – violins
- Stacey Shames – harp
- Fred Sladkey – assistant engineer
- Sébastien Surel – violin
- Ayako Tanaka – violin
- Ron Taylor – Pro Tools editing, additional vocal editing
- Natasha Tchitch – viola
- Angie Teo – recording, mix assistant, additional editing, engineering, assistant engineers
- Alan Tilston – assistant, drums, percussion, instrumentation
- Michael Turco – additional synths, outro music
- Sarah Veihan – cello
- David Wakefield – French horn
- Dan Warner – guitars
- Philippe Weiss – recording
- Ellen Westermann – celli
- Peter Wolford – assistant engineer
- Kenta Yonesaka – engineer

=== Business ===
- Jill Dell Abate – contractor, production coordinator
- Cathialine Zorzi – musicians contractor assistant
- Sara Zambreno – management
- Liz Rosenberg – publicity
- Guy Oseary – management
- Richard Feldstein – business management
- Shari Goldschmidt – business management
- Marlies Dwyer – legal
- Michael Goldsmith – legal
- P.C. – legal
- Joseph Penachio – legal
- Shire & Meiselas – legal
- Mark Baechle – copyist
- Grubman – legal
- Indursky – legal

=== Packaging ===
- Giovanni Bianco – art direction
- Mert and Marcus – photography
- Arianne Phillips – styling
- Gina Brooke – makeup
- Garren – hair
- Antonio Bernardi – wardrobe
- YSL – wardrobe
- Alexandre Vauthier – wardrobe
- Tom Ford – wardrobe
- Prada – wardrobe
- Markus Lupfer – wardrobe
- Miu Miu – wardrobe
- Gucci – wardrobe
- Kiki de Montparnasse – wardrobe
- Dolce & Gabbana – wardrobe
- Delfina Delettrez – wardrobe
- Dorothy Gaspar – wardrobe

== Charts ==
=== Weekly charts ===
Chart (2012)	Peak position
Argentine Albums (CAPIF)	5
Argentine Albums (CAPIF) Deluxe version	1
Australian Albums (ARIA)	1
Austrian Albums (Ö3 Austria)	3
Belgian Albums (Ultratop Flanders)	1
Belgian Albums (Ultratop Wallonia)	3
Brazilian Albums (Billboard)	1
Canadian Albums (Billboard)	1
Croatian Albums (HDU)	1
Czech Albums (ČNS IFPI)	1
Danish Albums (Hitlisten)	2
Dutch Albums (Album Top 100)	1
Estonian Albums (Eesti Ekspress)	3
Finnish Albums (Suomen virallinen lista)	1
French Albums (SNEP)	2
German Albums (Offizielle Top 100)	3
Greek Albums (IFPI)	1
Hungarian Albums (MAHASZ)	1
Indian Albums (Planet M)	1
Irish Albums (IRMA)	1
Italian Albums (FIMI)	1
Japanese Albums (Oricon)	4
Mexican Albums (AMPROFON)	1
New Zealand Albums (RMNZ)	3
Norwegian Albums (VG-lista)	2
Polish Albums (ZPAV)	1
Portuguese Albums (AFP)	2
Russian Albums (2М)	1
Scottish Albums (Official Charts)	1
South African Albums (RISA)	17
South Korean Albums (Circle) Deluxe Version	20
Spanish Albums (Promusicae)	1
Swedish Albums (Sverigetopplistan)	1
Swiss Albums (Schweizer Hitparade)	2
UK Albums (Official Charts)	1
US Billboard 200	1
US Top Dance Albums (Billboard)	1

=== Monthly charts ===
Chart (2012)	Peak position
Uruguayan Albums (CUD)	13
Uruguayan Albums (CUD) Deluxe version	5

=== Year-end charts ===
Chart (2012)	Position
Argentine Albums (CAPIF)	58
Argentine Albums (CAPIF) Deluxe version	25
Australia Dance Albums (ARIA)	19
Belgian Albums (Ultratop Flanders)	40
Belgian Albums (Ultratop Wallonia)	23
Canadian Albums (Billboard)	40
Danish Albums (Hitlisten)	33
Dutch Albums (MegaCharts)	38
Finnish Foreign Albums (Suomen virallinen lista)	10
French Albums (SNEP)	44
German Albums (Offizielle Top 100)	76
Hungarian Albums (MAHASZ)	12
Hungarian Albums & Compilations (MAHASZ)	35
Italian Albums (FIMI)	15
Japanese Albums (Oricon)	83
Mexican Albums (AMPROFON)	48
Polish Albums (ZPAV)	26
Russian Albums (2М)	1
Spanish Albums (PROMUSICAE)	23
Swedish Albums (Sverigetopplistan)	39
Swedish Albums & Compilations (Sverigetopplistan)	61
Swiss Albums (Schweizer Hitparade)	32
UK Albums (OCC)	81
US Billboard 200	44
US Dance/Electronic Albums (Billboard)	2
Worldwide (IFPI)	12

Chart (2015)	Position
Australia Dance Albums (ARIA)	48

== Certifications and sales ==
Region	Certification	Certified units/sales
Argentina (CAPIF)	Gold	20,000^{^}
Australia (ARIA)	Gold	35,000^{^}
Austria (IFPI Austria)	Gold	10,000^{*}
Brazil (Pro-Música Brasil)	2× Platinum	100,000
Canada	—	32,000 (Note: Canadian sales as of March 2012 according to Nielsen SoundScan.)
Colombia	2× Platinum	
Denmark (IFPI Danmark)	Gold	10,000^{^}
Finland (Musiikkituottajat)	Gold	10,908
France (SNEP)	Platinum	150,000
Germany (BVMI)	Gold	100,000^{^}
Hungary (MAHASZ)	Gold	3,000^{^}
India	Gold	
Italy (FIMI)	Platinum	60,000^{*}
Japan (RIAJ)	Gold	100,000^{^}
Mexico (AMPROFON)	Gold	30,000^{^}
Netherlands (NVPI)	Gold	25,000^{^}
New Zealand (RMNZ)	Gold	7,500^{‡}
Poland (ZPAV)	Platinum	20,000^{*}
Portugal (AFP)	Gold	7,500^{^}
Russia (NFPF)	7× Platinum	70,000^{*}
South Korea	—	2,770 (Note: In South Korea, MDNA sold in the first two-months a total of 2,770 copies: 1,720 for the deluxe version and 1,050 for the standard.)
Spain (Promusicae)	Gold	30,000
Sweden (GLF)	Gold	20,000^{‡}
Turkey	—	30,000
United Kingdom (BPI)	Gold	140,000
United States (RIAA)	Gold	539,000
Summaries
Worldwide	—	2,000,000
^{*} Sales figures based on certification alone.^{^} Shipments figures based on certification alone.^{‡} Sales+streaming figures based on certification alone.

== Release history ==
Region	Date	Format(s)	Edition(s)	Label(s)
Australia	March 23, 2012	CD; digital download	Standard; deluxe	Universal Music
Germany	March 23, 2012	CD; digital download	Standard; deluxe	Universal Music
Canada	March 23, 2012	CD; digital download	Standard; deluxe	Universal Music
Colombia	March 26, 2012	CD; digital download	Standard; deluxe	Universal Music
Japan	March 26, 2012	CD; digital download	Deluxe	Universal Music
Turkey	March 26, 2012	CD; digital download	Standard; deluxe	Universal Music
United Kingdom	March 26, 2012	CD; digital download	Standard; deluxe	Polydor
United States	March 26, 2012	CD; digital download	Standard; deluxe	Interscope
Thailand	March 26, 2012	CD; digital download	Standard; deluxe	Universal Music
United States	April 10, 2012	LP	Deluxe	Interscope
Various	January 1, 2026	Digital download; streaming	Reissue	Warner
Japan	May 27, 2026	CD	Reissue	Warner

== See also ==
- List of Billboard 200 number-one albums of 2012
- List of Billboard number-one electronic albums of 2012
- List of number-one albums of 2012 (Australia)
- List of number-one albums of 2012 (Canada)
- List of number-one albums of 2012 (Finland)
- List of number-one albums of 2012 (Ireland)
- List of number-one albums of 2012 (Mexico)
- List of number-one albums of 2012 (Poland)
- List of number-one albums of 2012 (Spain)
- List of number-one hits of 2012 (Italy)
- List of number-one singles and albums in Sweden
- List of UK Albums Chart number ones of the 2010s
