= Masterpiece (Madonna song) =

Promotional single by Madonna

from the album MDNA and W.E. (Music from the Motion Picture)
- Released: April 2, 2012
- Recorded: 2011
- Studio: 3:20 Studios (Los Angeles); MSR Studios (New York City)
- Genre: Pop; folk-pop
- Length: 3:59
- Label: Interscope
- Songwriters: Madonna; Julie Frost; Jimmy Harry
- Producers: Madonna; William Orbit

Licensed audio
- "Masterpiece" on YouTube

"Masterpiece" is a song by American singer Madonna for the soundtrack of the 2011 film W.E. The song was later included on her twelfth studio album MDNA (2012). It served official radio release in the United Kingdom on April 2, 2012, to promote the album. Madonna composed the song alongside Julie Frost and Jimmy Harry, and produced it with William Orbit. "Masterpiece" is a midtempo pop and folk-pop ballad which is reminiscent of her works from the 1990s. The song garnered positive reviews from contemporary critics, who praised its lyrical content and Madonna's vocal performance.

"Masterpiece" won the Best Original Song category at the 69th Golden Globe Awards, but was deemed ineligible for the similar category at the 84th Academy Awards. Its Golden Globe nomination sparked a red carpet rivalry between Madonna and fellow nominee, singer Elton John. "Masterpiece" peaked at number one in Russia, while reaching the lower regions of the charts in the Czech Republic, Japan, South Korea and the United Kingdom. It was performed by Madonna on The MDNA Tour (2012), where she was accompanied by Basque musicians Kalakan trio. The performance was considered a highlight of the tour.

== Writing and development ==
"Masterpiece" was composed by Madonna, Julie Frost and Jimmy Harry and produced by Madonna and William Orbit. When Madonna was directing her film W.E., her manager Guy Oseary persuaded the singer to compose a song for the soundtrack. Frost was living in Los Angeles at that time and was assessing her priorities in the music world, and wanted to collaborate with a number of artists, Madonna being the first. "She is an icon", Frost said, "But most importantly she has some of the best Pop songs in the history of music... so yeah it's always a dream to work with people like her." Orbit, who was working with Frost and Harry on an assignment, contacted them for collaborating with Madonna on "Masterpiece". He had heard Frost's initial composition of the song and knew that Madonna would love it. According to Frost the theme explained to them was about bittersweet love and the hardships felt being in a relationship. Madonna, Frost and Harry sat together with this idea and brainstormed and came up with the lyrics and the melody. Over time, Madonna changed the structure of the song and the final version was ready for recording. Madonna recalled:

"[Guy Oseary] harangued me for the entire time I was filming and editing my movie to write a song. And I said, 'Please, Guy, I'm trying to focus on being a director and I want people to pay attention to the film and I don't have time.' So then I finished the film and I started making my record and somehow magically and miraculously the song emerged, 'Masterpiece,' so thank you, Guy Oseary, for being so irritating."

== Recording and composition ==
"Masterpiece"
A 23 second sample of "Masterpiece", featuring the chorus of the song with lyrics "And I'm right by your side, Like a thief in the night, I stand in front of a masterpiece".

"Masterpiece" is a midtempo pop and folk-pop ballad featuring basic recording and production by Orbit. It was recorded in two locations, 3:20 Studios, Los Angeles, California and MSR Studios, New York City. Madonna reflected on the recording sessions with Orbit: "We've worked on stuff for so many years that we kind of finish each other's sentences. He knows my taste and what I like. Magic happens when we get into a recording studio together." Additional production came from Harry, who also played acoustic guitars, keyboards, vocoder and did the programming for the track. Demacio "Demo" Castellon mixed and engineered the song with help from Frank Filipetti, while Angie Teo did additional engineering and editing. Other personnel working on "Masterpiece" was Ron Taylor who did Pro Tools editing and further editing from Stephen "The Koz" Kozmeniuk.

In "Masterpiece", Madonna sings about the pain of being in love with someone who is a great work of art, with the lyrics including "If you were the Mona Lisa, You'd be hanging in the Louvre, Everyone would come to see you, You'd be impossible to move." Madonna said the song describes Wallis Simpson and is "about a woman who has fallen in love with this untouchable thing, this man that was raised to be king. One of the lines of the song 'it must be so hard to always be the chosen one.' At the end of the day nothing is indestructible, no matter how high you might rise in the world you are still a human being." Marc Schneider from Billboard described "Masterpiece" as a slowed-down, moody ballad that showcases strong execution of vocals from Madonna. He described the production as "simple, direct and reminiscent of her sound in the 1990s". The lyrics were described as emotional, and was comparable to the film's love story, with the chorus as follows: "And I'm right by your side, Like a thief in the night, I stand in front of a masterpiece. And I can't tell you why it hurts so much to be in love with a masterpiece. 'Cause after all, nothing's indestructible".

== Critical reception ==
"Masterpiece" received positive reviews from music critics. Bradley Stern from MTV wrote that "with its poetic lyrics and gorgeous orchestration, "Masterpiece" is an instant classic addition to Madonna's back catalog of stellar balladry." Another review from MTV stated that "the song doesn't follow Madonna's usual style of sexy, energetic and mischievious [sic], rather it shows Madge's wisdom of naked beauty with stripped down vocals, strong penned lyrics and haunting melodies." Michael Cragg from The Guardian praised the song as one of the best vocal performances on MDNA. Neil McCormick from The Daily Telegraph described the song as "sweet, gentle love song with a Spanish guitar loop, a light beat and flowing melody, filled out by synthetic strings."

Kyle Anderson of Entertainment Weekly described the song as a throwback to Madonna's mid-1990s style. Nick Levine from The National felt that the song would fit neatly onto her 1995 ballads compilation Something to Remember. Blogcritics editor Tyrone S. Reid called the song a "slow-burning instant classic," which recalls Madonna's Ray of Light era. Robert Copsey from Digital Spy felt that the song's production is more "organic" and "it doesn't try to be anything other than a solid pop song."

== Accolades ==
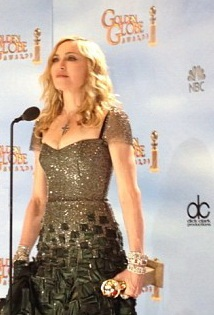
Madonna received the trophy for Best Original Song at the 69th Golden Globe Awards.

On January 15, 2012, "Masterpiece" won the Best Original Song category at the 69th Golden Globe Awards. Its nomination sparked rivalrous comments on the red carpet from fellow singer Elton John, whose song—"Hello, Hello" from Gnomeo & Juliet—was also nominated in the category. John told host Carson Daly that Madonna "hasn't got a fucking chance" of winning the award. When Madonna later had her red carpet interview with Daly, she took swipes at John's masculinity first, asking about his wardrobe: "Was he wearing a dress?" and after being informed of his comments stating, "May the best man win".

Subsequent to the announcement, John's husband, David Furnish, opined on his personal Facebook page that "Madonna winning Best Original Song truly shows how these awards have nothing to do with merit". Madonna commented backstage: "I hope [Elton John] speaks to me for the next couple of years. He's been known to get mad at me so I don't know. He's brilliant and I adore him so he'll win another award. I don't feel bad!"

"Masterpiece" was ineligible for the Best Original Song category at the 84th Academy Awards, since it was not "used either in the body of the film, or as the 'first music cue' in the closing credits (i.e. the first song that plays once the screen fades to black)." It was used too late in the film credits to be eligible. "Masterpiece" was also nominated for Best Original Song Written Directly for a Film at the 2012 World Soundtrack Awards, but lost to Albert Nobbs theme "Lay Your Head Down" by Brian Byrne and Glenn Close.

== Chart performance ==
"Masterpiece" was released to radio stations the United Kingdom on April 2, 2012. The song reached number 25 on the UK Airplay Chart with 26.60 million audience impressions and 660 plays on radio during the eleventh week of 2012. The song later debuted at number 68 on the UK Singles Chart for issue date of April 7, 2012, due to digital download of the track from MDNA. The next week was its final appearance on the chart, dropping at number 87. In Japan, the song debuted at number 77 on the Japan Hot 100 chart on the issue date of February 13, 2012 and remained on the chart for one week. The song also debuted on the Japanese Hot Top Airplay at number 58 as well as on the Digital and Airplay Overseas at number 19. In Czech Republic, the song debuted at number 83 on the official airplay chart for the ninth week of 2012. It peaked at number 58 in its seventh week and stayed on the chart for 12 weeks. In South Korea, the song debuted at number 147 on the Gaon International Downloads Chart with sales of 2,516 copies. The song achieved its strongest chart performance in Russia, where it topped the Russian Music Charts in the week of December 2, 2012. It became the sixth most successful song of 2012 with 409,334 radio plays across Russia.

== Live performance ==
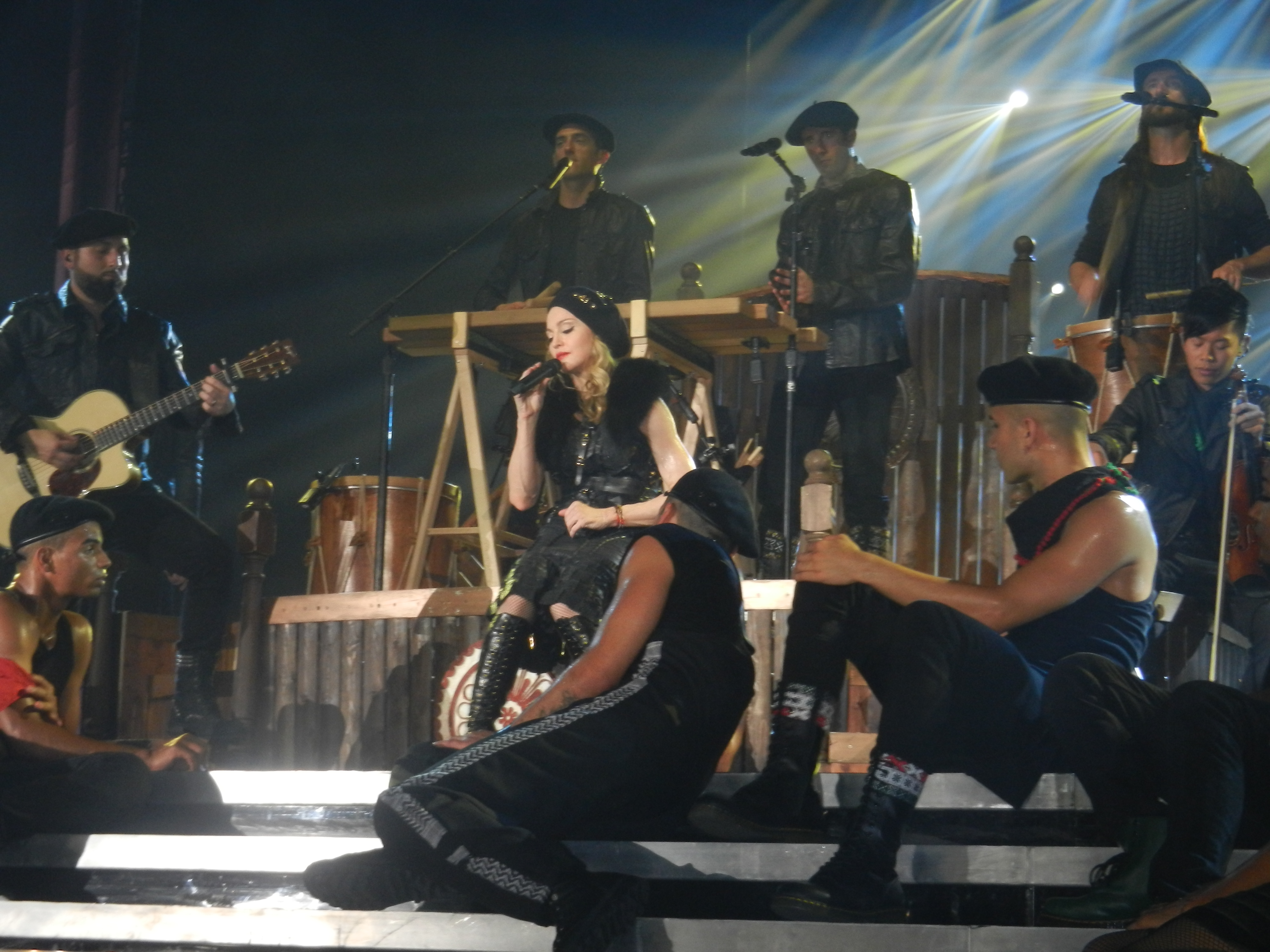
Madonna, flanked by her dancers and the Kalakan trio at the back, performs "Masterpiece" during The MDNA Tour

Madonna performed "Masterpiece" at The MDNA Tour in 2012. It was a part of the third segment of the concert, titled Prophecy, where a mix of joyful songs that "bring people together" were performed. The wardrobe during the performance included an all-leather look, a custom design by Hervé Léger and Max Azria, with knee-high boots and a mini fur bolero. After finishing an energetic performance of "Open Your Heart", Madonna is joined by Basque musicians Kalakan trio and they perform a Basque song called "Sagarra Jo". After that, Madonna sat down to sing an acoustic guitar, fiddle, and beat-based version of "Masterpiece", as clips from W.E. appeared in the backdrops. The Kalakan trio backed the singer during the performance, while her dancers accompanied Madonna on stage, dressed as soldiers. The performance of the song at the November 19–20, 2012, shows in Miami, at the American Airlines Arena were recorded and released in Madonna's fourth live album, MDNA World Tour.

Sarah Rodman from The Boston Globe felt that the addition of the Kalakan trio "enriched" the song, which was already a stand-out track from MDNA. The Atlanta Journal-Constitution's Melissa Ruggieri considered it the show's highlight, while a writer for The Glasgow Herald felt that the performance invigorated Madonna's artistic side.

== Credits and personnel ==
Credits and personnel adapted from the liner notes of MDNA.

=== Management ===
- Recorded at 3:20 Studios, Los Angeles, California and MSR Studios, New York City
- Webo Girl Publishing, Inc. (ASCAP), EMI April Music Inc., Totally Famous Music and Curvature Music (ASCAP),

=== Personnel ===
- Madonna – songwriter, producer, vocals
- Julie Frost – songwriter
- Jimmy Harry – songwriter, additional production, acoustic guitars, keyboards, vocoder, programming
- William Orbit – producer
- Demacio "Demo" Castellon – mixing, engineering
- Frank Filipetti – engineering
- Angie Teo – engineering, additional editing
- Ron Taylor – Pro Tools editing
- Stephen "The Koz" Kozmeniuk – additional editing

== Charts ==
=== Weekly charts ===
Weekly chart performance for "Masterpiece"
Chart (2012)	Peak position
CIS Airplay (TopHit)	2
Czech Republic Airplay (ČNS IFPI)	58
Iceland (RÚV)	28
Japan Hot 100 (Billboard)	77
Russia (Billboard)	1
Russia Airplay (TopHit)	1
South Korea International (GAON)	147
UK Singles (Official Charts)	68
Ukraine Airplay (TopHit)	11

=== Year-end charts ===
2012 year-end chart performance for "Masterpiece"
Chart (2012)	Position
CIS (TopHit)	7
Russia Airplay (TopHit)	6
Ukraine Airplay (TopHit)	62

2013 year-end chart performance for "Masterpiece"
Chart (2013)	Position
CIS (TopHit)	74
Russia Airplay (TopHit)	83
Ukraine Airplay (TopHit)	104

== Release history ==
Country	Date	Format	Label
United Kingdom	April 2, 2012	Contemporary hit radio	Polydor Records
