= List of songs recorded by Dragonette =

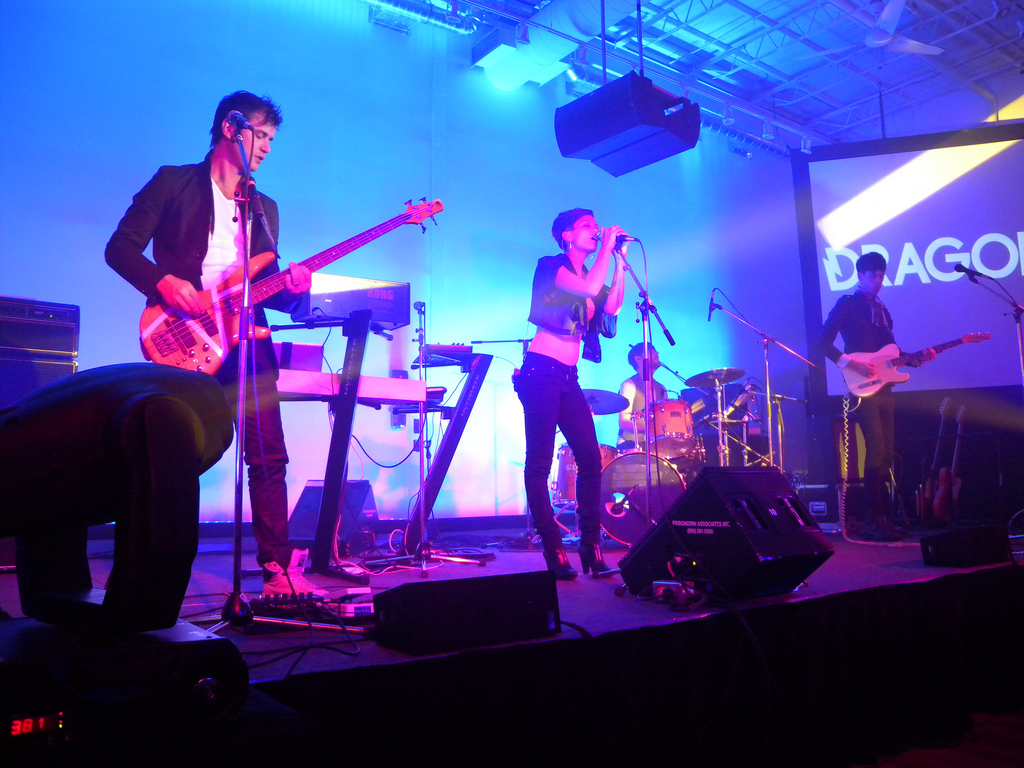
Dragonette have recorded songs for three studio albums.

Canadian electronic music group Dragonette have recorded songs for four studio albums, one extended play, one compilation album and several guest features. The group was founded in 2005 by Martina Sorbara, Dan Kurtz, Joel Stouffer and Simon Craig. They released a self-produced EP that same year and later signed with Mercury Records.

Dragonette released their debut studio album, Galore, in September 2007. Sorbara and Kurtz co-wrote all of its songs, and would continue to do so for their later albums. Sorbara and Kurtz collaborated with Steve Chrisanthou and Pete Prilesnik on the album's second single "Take It Like a Man", while American producer Greg Kurstin co-wrote the song "Black Limousine". The United States version of the album featured a cover version of "The Girls" (retitled "The Boys"), a song originally recorded by Scottish electronic artist Calvin Harris.

The band released their second studio album, Fixin to Thrill, in September 2009. It reached the top ten in Canada and was followed by Mixin to Thrill (2010), a remix album that contained three new songs written by Sorbara and Kurtz. In 2010, Dragonette collaborated with French DJ Martin Solveig on the single "Hello". The song reached number one in five countries and earned the band a Canadian Juno Award for Dance Recording of the Year in 2012. Three other songs performed with Solveig appeared on his fourth studio album Smash (2011). Bodyparts, the band's third studio album, was released in September 2012. Dragonette collaborated with Australian musician Felix Bloxsom on the song "Right Woman" and Sorbara and Kurtz co-wrote "Giddy Up" with producer Rene Arsenault. Their fourth studio album, Royal Blues, was released in 2016.

== Songs ==
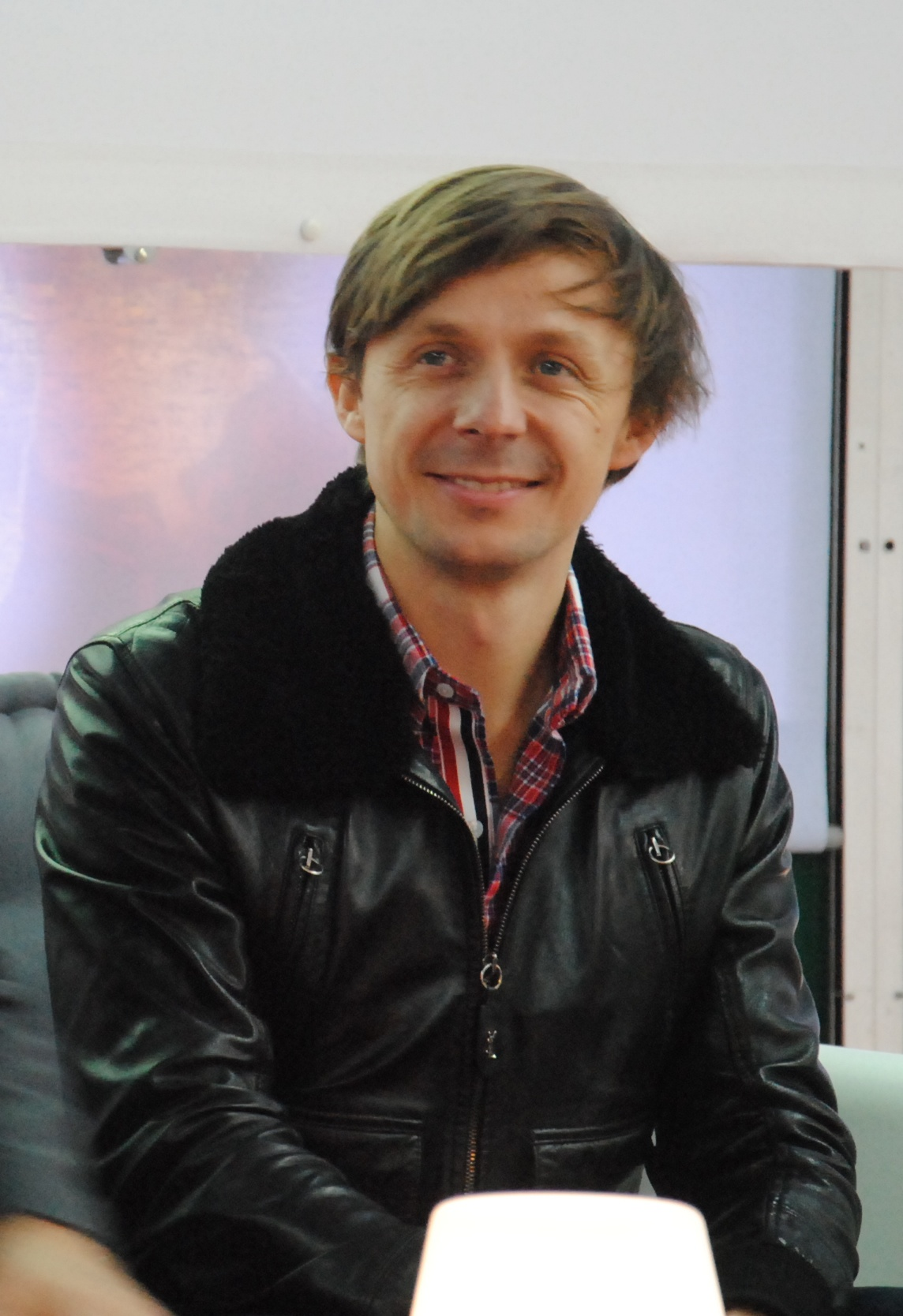
Martin Solveig (pictured) recorded four songs with Dragonette for his fourth studio album Smash (2011).

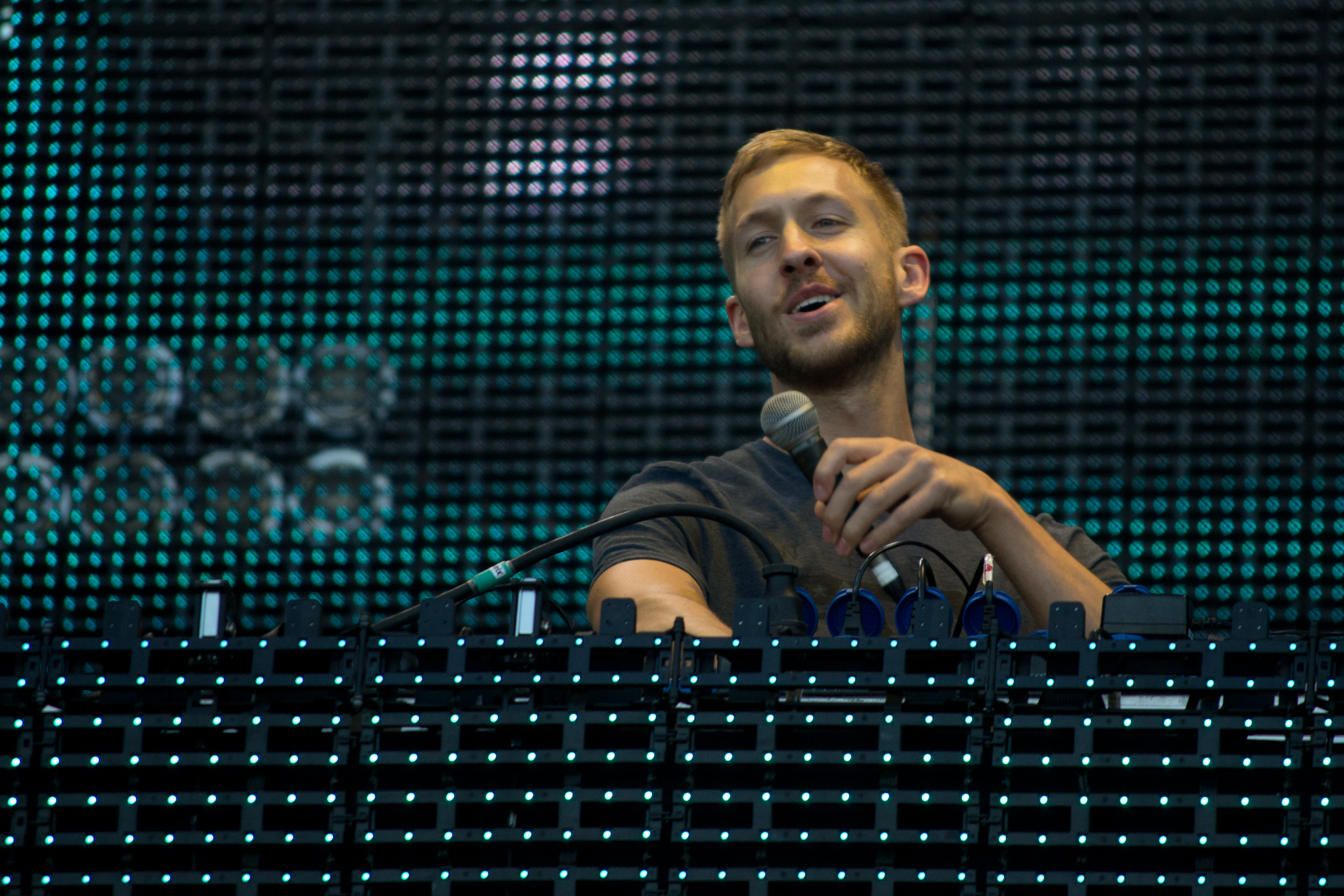
Dragonette recorded a cover of Calvin Harris' (pictured) song "The Girls" for the American version of their debut studio album Galore (2008).

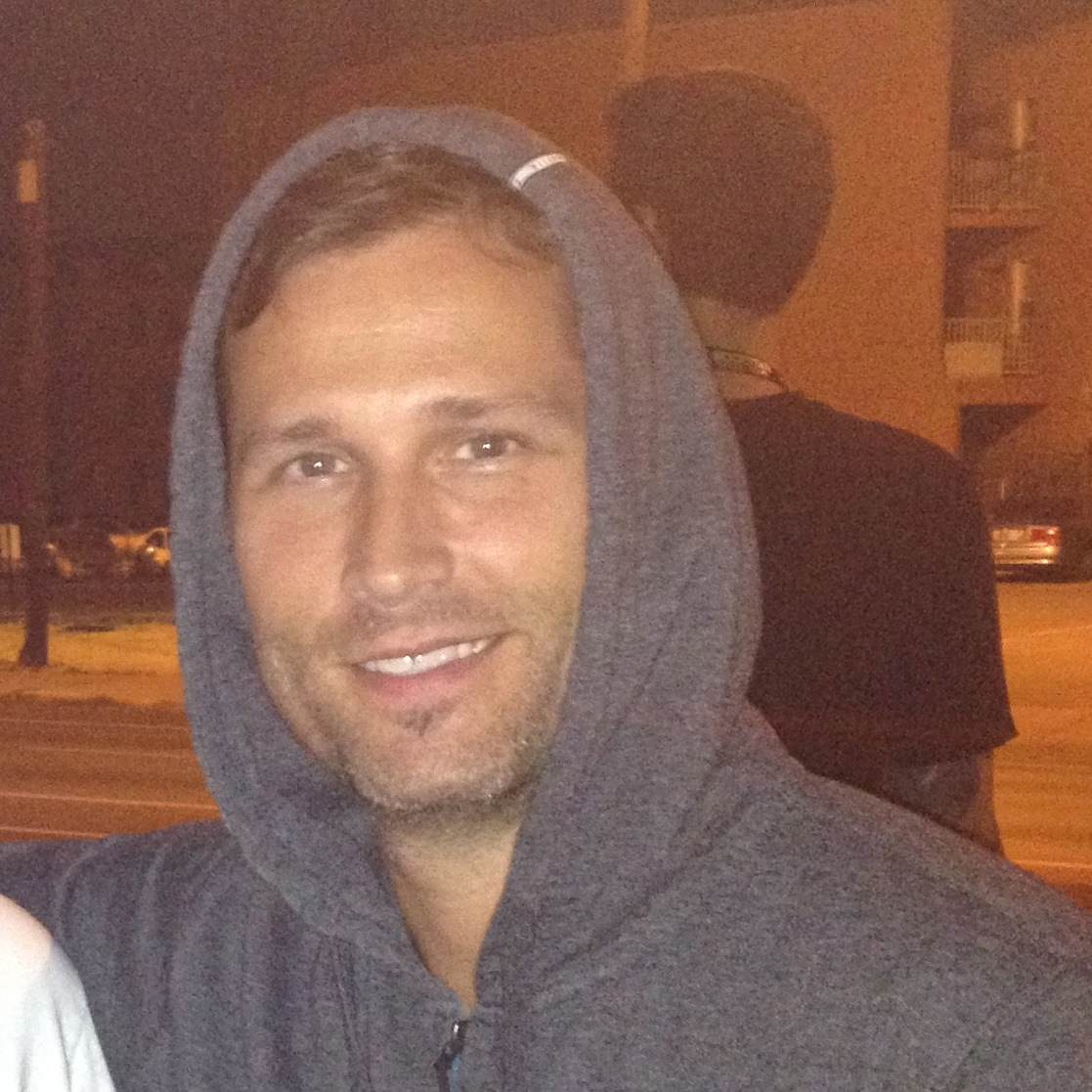
Dragonette collaborated with American DJ Kaskade (pictured) on the song "Fire in Your New Shoes" from his sixth studio album Dynasty (2010).

Key
†	Indicates single release
#	Indicates promotional single release

Song	Artist(s)	Writer(s)	Release	Year	Ref.
"Animale" †	Don Diablo featuring Dragonette	Don Schipper; Martina Sorbara	Animale	2010	
"Another Day"	Dragonette	Martina Sorbara; Dan Kurtz	Galore	2007	
"Big in Japan" †	Martin Solveig featuring Dragonette and Idoling!!!	Martin Solveig; Martina Sorbara	Smash	2011	
"Big Sunglasses"	Dragonette	Martina Sorbara; Dan Kurtz	Fixin to Thrill	2009	
"Black Limousine"	Dragonette	Martina Sorbara; Dan Kurtz; Greg Kurstin	Galore	2007	
"Boys & Girls" †	Martin Solveig featuring Dragonette	Martin Solveig	Smash	2011	
"Can't Stop"	Martin Solveig featuring Dragonette	Martin Solveig; Martina Sorbara; Michael Tordjman	Smash	2011	
"Cuckoo"	Dragonette	Martina Sorbara; Dan Kurtz	Bodyparts	2012	
"Come On Be Good" #	Dragonette	Martina Sorbara; Dan Kurtz	Fixin to Thrill	2009	
"Competition" #	Dragonette	Martina Sorbara; Dan Kurtz	Galore	2007	
"Don't Be Funny"	Dragonette	Martina Sorbara; Dan Kurtz	Fixin to Thrill	2009	
"Easy" †	Dragonette	Martina Sorbara; Dan Kurtz	Fixin to Thrill	2009	
"Fire in Your New Shoes" †	Kaskade featuring Dragonette	Ryan Raddon; Mark Phillips; Finn Bjarnson; Martina Sorbara	Dynasty	2010	
"Fixin to Thrill" †	Dragonette	Martina Sorbara; Dan Kurtz	Fixin to Thrill	2009	
"Get Lucky"	Dragonette	Martina Sorbara	Galore	2007	
"Ghost"	Dragonette	Martina Sorbara; Dan Kurtz	Bodyparts	2012	
"Giddy Up"	Dragonette	Martina Sorbara; Dan Kurtz; Rene Arsenault	Bodyparts	2012	
"Gone Too Far" †	Dragonette	Martina Sorbara; Dan Kurtz	Fixin to Thrill	2009	
"Gold Rush"	Dragonette	Martina Sorbara; Dan Kurtz; Joel Stouffer	Galore	2007	
"Hello" †	Martin Solveig featuring Dragonette	Martin Solveig; Martina Sorbara	Smash	2011	
"Holidaisy"	Dragonette	Martina Sorbara	Bodyparts	2012	
"I Get Around" †	Dragonette	Martina Sorbara; Dan Kurtz	Galore	2007	
"Jesus Doesn't Love Me" #	Dragonette	Martina Sorbara; Dan Kurtz	Galore	2007	
"Lay Low"	Dragonette	Martina Sorbara; Dan Kurtz	Bodyparts	2012	
"Let It Go" †	Dragonette	Martina Sorbara; Dan Kurtz	Bodyparts	2012	
"Liar"	Dragonette	Martina Sorbara; Dan Kurtz	Fixin to Thrill	2009	
"Live in This City" †	Dragonette	Martina Sorbara; Dan Kurtz	Bodyparts	2012	
"Magic Fantastic"	Dragonette	Martina Sorbara; Dan Kurtz; Joel Stouffer	Dragonette EP	2005	
"Marvellous"	Dragonette	Martina Sorbara; Dan Kurtz	Galore	2007	
"Merry Xmas (Says Your Text Message)" #	Dragonette	Martina Sorbara; Dan Kurtz Alan Tilston Ron Feemster	Merry Xmas (Says Your Text Message)	2012	
"My Legs" †	Dragonette	Martina Sorbara; Dan Kurtz	Bodyparts	2012	
"My Things"	Dragonette	Martina Sorbara; Dan Kurtz	Mixin to Thrill	2010	
"My Work Is Done"	Dragonette	Martina Sorbara; Dan Kurtz	Bodyparts	2012	
"Neck and Neck"	Zeds Dead featuring Dragonette	Martina Sorbara; Dylan Mamid; Zachary Rapp-Rovan	Northern Lights	2016	
"Okay Dolore"	Dragonette	Martina Sorbara; Dan Kurtz	Fixin to Thrill	2009	
"Our Summer" †	Dragonette	Martina Sorbara; Dan Kurtz	Mixin to Thrill	2010	
"Outlines" †	Mike Mago featuring Dragonette	Mike Mago; Martina Sorbara; Matt Schwartz; Paul Harris	Non-album single	2014	
"Pick Up the Phone" †	Dragonette	Martina Sorbara; Dan Kurtz	Fixin to Thrill	2009	
"Red Heart Black" †	Dada, Paul Harris featuring Dragonette	Martina Sorbara; Matt Schwartz; Paul Harris	Non-album single	2015	
"Right Woman"	Dragonette	Martina Sorbara; Dan Kurtz; Felix Bloxsom	Bodyparts	2012	
"Riot" #	Dragonette	Martina Sorbara; Dan Kurtz	Bodyparts	2012	
"Rocket Ship"	Dragonette	Martina Sorbara; Dan Kurtz	Bodyparts	2012	
"Run Run Run" #	Dragonette	Martina Sorbara; Dan Kurtz	Bodyparts	2012	
"Shock Box"	Dragonette	Martina Sorbara; Dan Kurtz; Simon Craig	Dragonette EP	2005	
"Stupid Grin"	Dragonette	Martina Sorbara; Dan Kurtz	Fixin to Thrill	2009	
"Take It Like a Man" †	Dragonette	Martina Sorbara; Dan Kurtz; Steve Chrisanthou; Pete Prilesnik	Galore	2007	
"Teacher Teacher"	Dragonette	Martina Sorbara; Dan Kurtz; Simon Craig	Dragonette EP	2005	
"The Boys"	Dragonette	Calvin Harris	Galore	2008	
"True Believer"	Dragonette	Martina Sorbara; Dan Kurtz	Galore	2007	
"Untouchable"	Dragonette	Martina Sorbara; Dan Kurtz	Bodyparts	2012	
"Volcano" †	Dragonette	Martina Sorbara; Dan Kurtz	Mixin to Thrill	2010	
"We Rule the World"	Dragonette	Martina Sorbara; Dan Kurtz	Fixin to Thrill	2009	
"You're a Disaster"	Dragonette	Martina Sorbara; Dan Kurtz	Fixin to Thrill	2009	
"You Please Me"	Dragonette	Martina Sorbara; Dan Kurtz	Galore	2007	
"Won't You Be My Neighbor?"	Dragonette	Fred Rogers	Won't You Be My Neighbor?	2013	
