= Turn Up the Radio (Madonna song) =

2012 single by Madonna

Single by Madonna

from the album MDNA
- Released: June 29, 2012
- Studio: Sarm West Studios (London); MSR Studios (New York City)
- Genre: Dance-pop; electropop; Eurohouse
- Length: 3:46
- Label: Interscope
- Songwriters: Madonna; Martin Solveig; Michael Tordjman; Jade Williams; Mark Leggett; Jared Washburn
- Producers: Madonna; Martin Solveig

Madonna singles chronology
"Girl Gone Wild" (2012)	"Turn Up the Radio" (2012)	"Living for Love" (2014)

Music videos
- "Turn Up the Radio" on YouTube; "Turn Up the Radio (Explicit)" on YouTube

"Turn Up the Radio" is a song recorded by American recording artist Madonna for her twelfth studio album, MDNA (2012). It was written by Madonna, Martin Solveig, Michael Tordjman and Jade Williams, and produced by Madonna and Solveig. The song was released as the third and final single from the album on June 29, 2012. The single was also released as a digital EP, and included a remix featuring the group Far East Movement. "Turn Up the Radio" is a dance-pop, electropop and Euro house song with a French house-inspired chorus.

"Turn Up the Radio" received generally positive reviews from music critics. Some reviewers believed that the song should have been the lead single from the album. In the United States, the song became Madonna's 43rd number-one hit on the Billboard Hot Dance Club Songs chart. However, "Turn Up the Radio" had minor placements in other markets, peaking at number 175 on the UK Singles Chart.

An accompanying music video was shot in Italy, and directed by Tom Munro. It shows Madonna escaping the paparazzi on the back of a convertible. She travels throughout the city and the Italian countryside, picking up men from the roadside and having a party on the car. The video received general acclaim from critics, who commended the simplicity of the video and labeled it as Madonna's most fun video in years. The song was included on the setlist of the MDNA Tour where she performed it while playing a guitar.

== Background and release ==
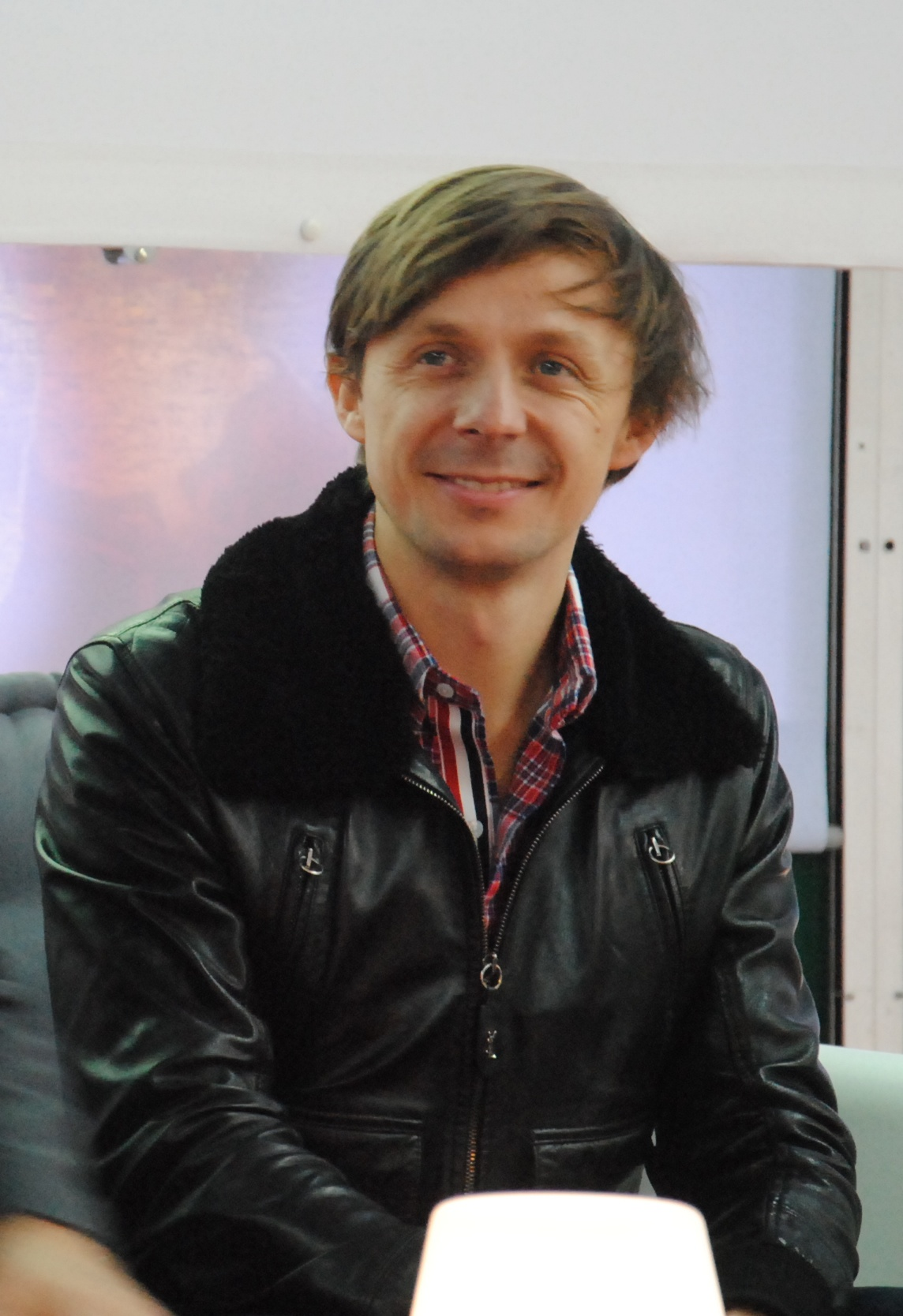
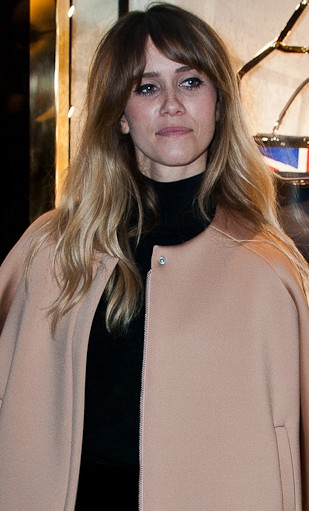
"Turn Up the Radio" was co-written by Martin Solveig (left) and Jade Williams (right).

In December 2010, Madonna posted a message on her Facebook page, expressing willingness to record new music. She also stated that she was "on the lookut for the maddest, sickest, most badass people to collaborate with." One of the collaborators was French DJ and producer Martin Solveig, who was invited to a writing session by Madonna in London in July 2011. Originally, Madonna wanted to work with Solveig on one song, but eventually it turned into three tracks—"Give Me All Your Luvin'", "I Don't Give A" and "Turn Up the Radio". In an interview with Billboard, Solveig explained that Madonna had ample amount of time to delve into the project, and after working on one song, they continued recording. Solveig described the sessions as fun and labeled them a "privileged time".

"Turn Up the Radio" was written by Madonna, Solveig, Michael Tordjman and British singer Jade Williams, best known as Sunday Girl. The existence of the song was first reported by a Madonna fan website in December 2011. It was recorded for Solveig's fifth studio album, Smash (2011), featuring lead vocals by Williams. However, the song was shelved in favor of their other collaboration called "Let's Not Play Games". Despite the track not appearing on Solveig's album, he still played the song live.

On April 11, 2012, Madonna's manager Guy Oseary responded to a Madonna fan on Twitter, who was asking for the song to be a single from MDNA. He replied saying the song "is feeling like the next single." The cover art was released on Madonna's official website on July 13, 2012. Before the single was released, Smirnoff released a seven-track digital remix EP titled MDNA: Nightlife Edition Remix EP in the UK to promote the album. It included three remixes of "Turn Up the Radio" by Leo Zero, Richard Vission and Marco V. The mixes by Zero and Vission were also included on the MDNA: Nightlife Edition of the album which was exclusively sold in the U.S. The single remix was released on August 3, 2012 in Australia and New Zealand, and August 5, 2012 in the United Kingdom. The EP included remixes by Offer Nissim, Martin Solveig and R3hab. Madonna also collaborated with group Far East Movement, who featured on the Laidback Luke remix of the single. The song was serviced to contemporary hit radio in the United States by Interscope on September 25, 2012.

== Recording and composition ==
'Turn Up the Radio' (2012)
A 22 second sample of "Turn Up the Radio", where Madonna sings the "you feel the wind on your face and your skin and it's here that I begin my story" line. The keyboard sounds accompany it and around the seven second mark, the music "crashes" to a beat.

"Turn Up the Radio" was recorded at MSR Studios and Sarm West Studios. It was produced by both Madonna and Solveig, the latter also working on the synth arrangement, the drums and the instrumentation for the song. Tordjman assisted Solveig on the synth arrangement. Demacio "Demo" Castellon, who represented The Demolition Crew group, was responsible for recording and mixing the track. Philippe Weiss and Graham Archer assisted Castellon on the recording, and Angie Teo assisted on the mixing. Lastly Jason "Metal" Donkersgoed did the additional editing of the song. According to Solveig, "Turn Up the Radio" was his first composition which Madonna approved for the album. On the first day of recording, the singer prepared all the things she wanted to change in the song and how she wanted to have the final version. She wanted to change the top lines and the melodies from the demo sung by Williams. During recording, Solveig muted the vocals and just played the instrumentals, then Madonna sang the song. The producer added that among all the songs they recorded, "Turn Up the Radio" was the most characteristic of a Madonna track.

The song begins with a keyboard, then turned into a midtempo, 1980s-inspired dance-pop, electropop and Euro house number. Reminiscent of Solveig's hit single "Hello", the song has a "catchy" hook and French house-inspired chorus, inline with Madonna's 2006 single "Get Together". According to Brad O'Mancey from Popjustice, the music continues to grow after the keyboard introduction and then crashes loudly. John Mitchell from MTV News described that there was a "propulsive" energy in the track that felt "authentic and alive". He added that "the calculated perfectionism" of other club tracks by Madonna might appear to be chilly, but the composition of "Turn Up the Radio" instead was "effervescent" and "happy". According to the sheet music of the song published by Guitar Tabs, "Turn Up the Radio" is set in the time signature of common time, with a moderate tempo of 127 beats per minute. It is composed in the key of D major with Madonna's vocals ranging from C♭ to A♭. The song follows a sequence of D♭–B–A♭min–G♭ in the verses and D♭–G♭–B–E♭min during the chorus.

Lyrically, Madonna pleads the listener to stop for a moment, to get away from the world through music, with the lines going as: "I don't know how I got to this stage / Let me out of my cage cause I'm dying / Turn up the radio, turn up the radio / Don't ask me where I wanna go, we gotta turn up the radio." It also talks about the need to relax as well as the need to have fun. According to NME's Priya Elan, "the song continues [Madonna's] career-spanning themes of getting into the groove, of uniting the bourgeoisie and rebelling." O'Mancey called it an "escapist anthem" and the ability of the lyrics to leave real life behind and accept freedom.

== Critical reception ==
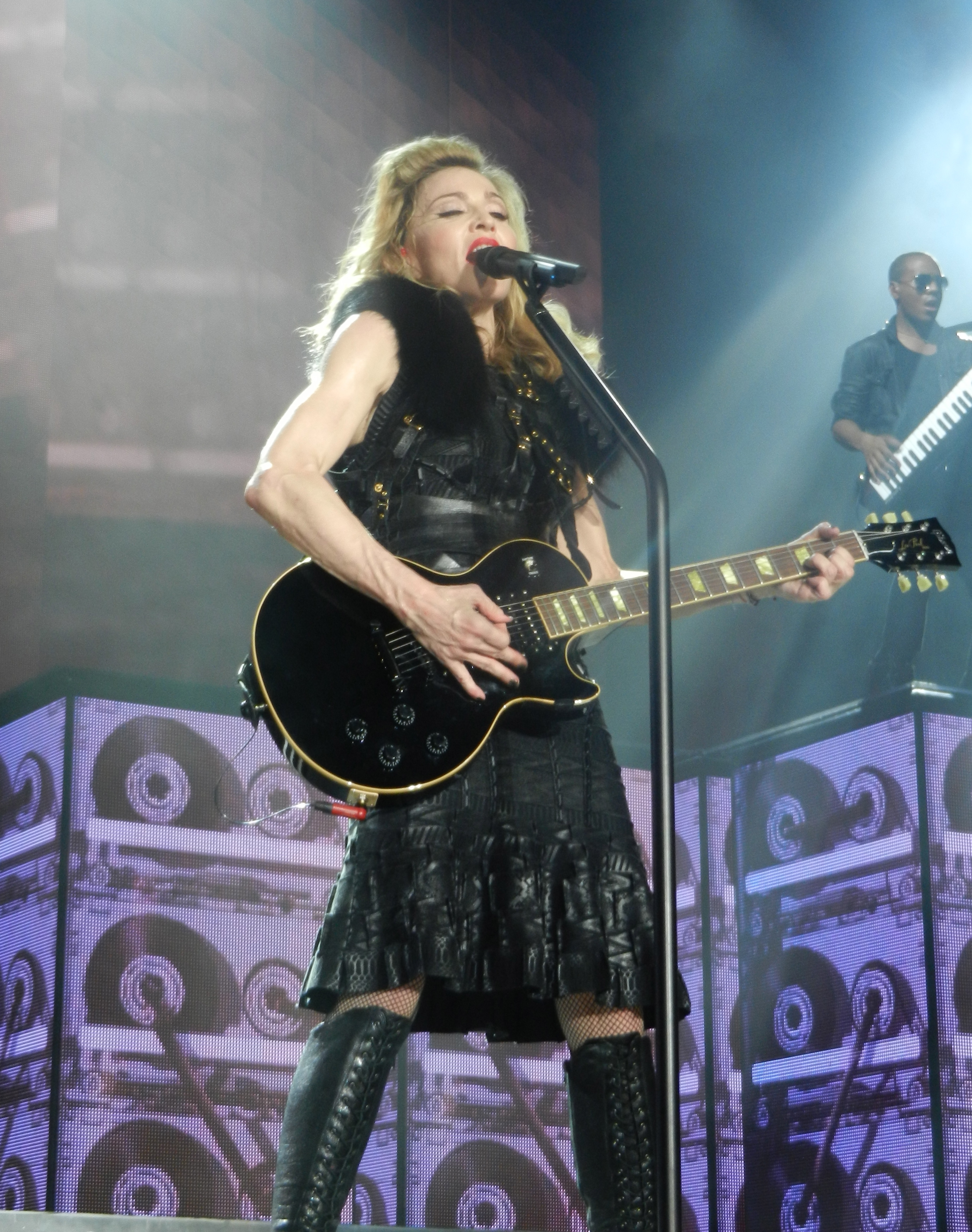
Madonna performing "Turn Up the Radio" during the opening night of The MDNA Tour on May 31, 2012

The song received generally positive reviews from music critics, who believed that it would have been a stronger choice as the lead single from MDNA. In a pre-release screening of MDNA, Matthew Todd from Attitude magazine praised the track, writing: "It may sound trite but there's urgency in its simplicity. It transforms into the album's most pounding moment, reaching a climax that threatens to blow the speakers." Todd added that some listeners might find the track "generic", and the song has characteristic elements of a Madonna release, and would be embraced by fans as a "dancefloor filler that will shake the clubs and would happily find a slot on the next series of Glee." Mitchell called it "a big, anthemic dance-pop wonder with glittery synths and fun lyrics." He also referred to the song as "the best thing [Madonna has] done since 'Hung Up'", and the most "mass accessible" track on MDNA. Enio Chiola from PopMatters found the song to be "complementing" the darker and edgier tracks on MDNA, but concluded that such tracks were few on the album. Chicago Tribune journalist Greg Kot found the song to be the one excelling in the first half of MDNA. Bernard Zuel of The Sydney Morning Herald called it a "compelling piece of hands-in-the-air dance" song, but wished Madonna would have included more of such tracks in MDNA. Michael Cragg from The Guardian appreciated the opening composition of the song, describing it as "a timely breather from the throbbing bass and feels more carefree and instinctive than what has gone before".

Keith Caulfield from Billboard called it one of the best tracks of the album, and wrote that "while the lyrics aren't provocative or necessarily new, it's still a peppy little tune that would sound great "on the radio." Laurence Green from musicOMH, also praised the track, writing that "the song repositions Madonna as the American Queen triumphant with the aid of a properly classic 'Madge melody' that echoes her '80s greats." Nick Levine, writing for The National, praised the composition and its similarity to "Get Together". In another review of the album for BBC News, Levine listed "Turn Up the Radio" as one of the thrilling tracks of MDNA, saying that the drop was like "an open manhole". Robert Copsey from Digital Spy noted that although there were few cliches with the lyrics, the production of the song was strong, and reminiscent of Daft Punk's music. Nitush Abebe from New York magazine called the song as one of the standouts on MDNA, along with "I'm a Sinner" and "I'm Addicted". Genevieve Koski from The A.V. Club felt that the lyrics were lazy and although the song had a "great hook", it is pulled down "by a pile of clichés [of] what could have been one of the album’s strongest tracks."

Slant Magazine's Paul Schrodt wrote: "One of MDNA' s many disparate attempts at pop relevance, 'Turn Up the Radio' is an innocuous but pleasurable enough anthem. The lyrics, aping 'Music' without the ironic wit, praise the restorative power of blasting tunes on a drive and forgetting your problems. In the end, though, Madonna isn’t able to put a distinctive stamp on the track, succumbing to producer Martin Solveig’s relentless beats and supersized bass". In a review of MDNA, Neil McCormick of The Daily Telegraph praised the track's dance-friendly nature, but called the lyrics banal. Aidin Vaziri of the San Francisco Chronicle also gave a mixed review, stating, "Madonna might actually be turning reflective...on the head-hammering 'Turn Up the Radio', when she sings, 'It was time I opened my eyes/ I'm leaving the past behind.' Is it about her doomed relationship with Guy Ritchie? Who knows? Who cares?". Matthew Parpetua from Pitchfork criticized Solveig's "unimaginative arrangements". Sian Rowe from NME found the track to be "flat", this view was also shared by Alex Macpherson from Fact magazine. Robert Leedham from Drowned in Sound called the song "mediocre", describing it as "synth-flavoured filler of the garden variety".

Jon Pareles from The New York Times called it shallow, effective club fodder, describing it as containing "blippy stereo-hopping synthesizers and generic title". Writing for the Houston Press, Nathan Smith opined it was "a much nicer, more danceable appropriation of French house by the singer, without a hint of the silly drumline crap and ill-advised rapping of 'Give Me All Your Luvin''". While ranking Madonna's singles in honor of her 60th birthday, Jude Rogers from The Guardian placed the track at number 41, calling it "bright, glossy and fun" and "proof that [Madonna] can still do classically simple pop singles nearly four decades into her career". Similarly, writing for Entertainment Weekly, Chuck Arnold listed "Turn Up the Radio" as the singer's 57th best single. He called it a "perfect intersection between EDM and classic Madonna". Writing for Gay Star News, Joe Morgan called it "the best song [Madonna] has released in the past few years. The production, with its blowing stereos and thrilling beats, is a work of art. In a perfect world, MDNA's output would have had this as the lead single".

== Chart performance ==
In the United States, "Turn Up the Radio" debuted at number 39 on the Hot Dance Club Songs chart, and reached number 19 the following week, earning the title of "Greatest Gainer". In its third week, the song once again earned the title of "Greatest Gainer" and reached number eight. It was Madonna's 57th top-ten song on the chart, and her 28th top-ten in a row, starting from "Beautiful Stranger" in 1999. It was the sixth song in the history of Hot Dance Club Songs to jump into the chart's top-ten in its third week; others being two songs by Madonna ("Give Me All Your Luvin'" and "Girl Gone Wild") and three songs by Lady Gaga ("Marry the Night", "You and I" and "Alejandro").

For the week ending August 30, 2012, the song jumped to the top position, earning Madonna her record-extending 43rd number-one single on the chart. With this feat, Madonna pulled further away from runner-up Janet Jackson, who has 19 number-one songs. Keith Caulfield from Billboard noted that with one more number one on Hot Dance Club Songs, Madonna would be able to claim another honor, that of having the most number ones on any single Billboard chart. Madonna broke this record in 2015, her single "Ghosttown" reached number one on this chart, giving her 45 number ones. With "Turn Up the Radio" reaching the top, Madonna also had her 156th overall number-one song on an active and current tabulated charts for Billboard, the most for any artist. Along with Hot Dance Club Songs, the song also debuted and peaked at number two on the Hot Dance Singles Sales and number three on the Hot Singles Sales charts.

== Music video ==
=== Background and synopsis ===
The music video for "Turn Up the Radio" was shot in Florence, Italy in June 2012. The director was Tom Munro, who previously directed Madonna's music video for "Give It 2 Me" (2008). Madonna was on The MDNA Tour, which supported the album, and decided to shoot the video at Florence, where she had a performance at the Stadio Artemio Franchi. Fashion house Balmain provided the costumes for the video. It was released on July 16, 2012, with a preview having been released on July 13, 2012.

The video begins with Madonna getting picked up by her chauffeur amidst a crowd of paparazzi] She appears to be irritated and exhausted. The chauffeur turns on the radio and she gradually calms down. Along the drive, the singer picks up several men who are scantily dressed with whom she sets off on a long ride through the town and country as the crowd continue to chase her. Madonna also picks up street dancers and exotic women in her car as the journey continues. By the end of the video, Madonna has a whole group of people with whom she parties on the car, and throws out her chauffeur on the street, with his pants down. Interspersed throughout are scenes of Madonna actually filming the music video, with the film crew seen in front of the convertible. The ending features an exhausted Madonna laying down in the backseat of the convertible as the chauffeur says in Italian: "La festa è finita, adesso allacciati la cintura stronzetta!," which means in English: "The party is over, now fasten the seat-belt, bitch!".

=== Reception ===
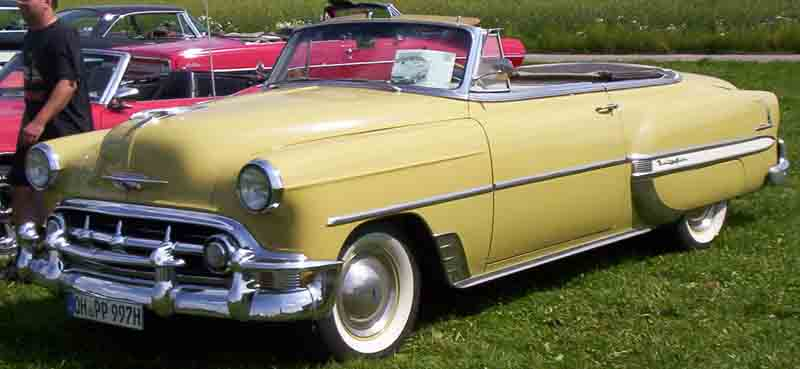
A convertible, like the one pictured, was used as Madonna's ride in the music video.

The music video received favorable response from critics, who praised its simplicity. Amanda Dobbins of New York gave props to Madonna for looking good in a leotard and for giving break to the young actors accompanying her in the video. Brett Warner of the website Ology appreciated the vintage feel of the video writing: "Heavy sigh. Remember a time when pop videos didn't have to shimmer and sparkle, when you didn't need choreographed dance routines or outlandish costumes? Remember when cars and cleavage was enough? Madonna clearly does." Mark Hogan from Spin noted that the video appeared a literal take on the song's lyrics but the change of scenery to the Italian countryside and the party scenes made it endearing. Melinda Newman from HitFix stated that although the video did not live up to Madonna's other endeavors, it fit the "carefree" theme of the song. She found influences of Italian film director Federico Fellini's works, especially his 1957 release Nights of Cabiria, in the scene showing Madonna picking up prostitutes in her car.

A writer for Rolling Stone noticed how Madonna's fans also make an appearance in the "simple" video. Brennan Carly from Billboard wrote that Madonna seemed "down-to-earth and affable" in the video. Bradley Stern from MuuMuse called the video as La Dolce Vita "through Instagram filters" and found elements of the music video for Madonna's 1998 single "Drowned World/Substitute for Love", with the paparazzi shots. He declared the scenes showing Madonna's then-boyfriend Brahim Zaibat, the singer's cleavage and booty slaps as highlights of the video. Stern concluded by saying that he "thought this would be much worse because the concept is so flimsy, but I have to say: It's kind of a treat to see Madonna letting loose and having some fun." Belinda White from The Daily Telegraph wrote that Madonna refused to act "her age" in the video but "she has us more than a little envious of all the fun she's having, not to mention how incredible she looks." Leslie Price from Pop Dust website found Madonna's getup as similar to actress Brigitte Bardot.

Erick Strecker from Entertainment Weekly was critical in his review since he felt that "nothing" worthwhile happened in the video and the party never achieved its full potential. Leslie Gornstein from E! found that the shots of Madonna being irritated by the paparazzi is "classic love-me-pity-me game that celebrities have been playing since Marilyn Monroe, and the original pop princess manipulates it to full effect in her latest video". She concluded by saying that the whole setup of the video was "laughable".

== Live performance ==
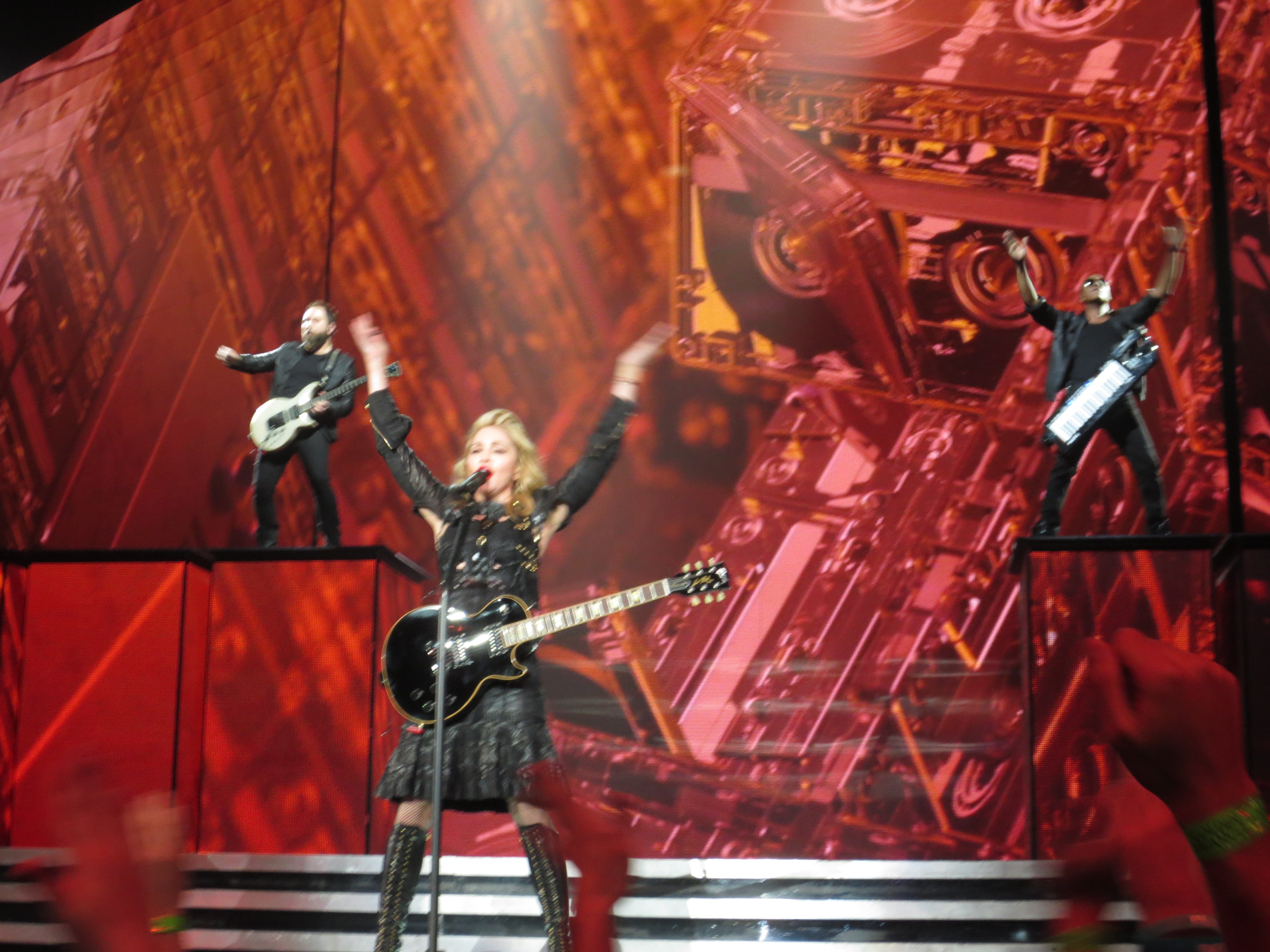
Madonna backed by her guitarists while performing the song on the MDNA Tour

Madonna performed "Turn Up the Radio" on the MDNA Tour as the third song of the second segment of the concert, titled Prophecy, where a mix of joyful songs that "bring people together" were performed. The wardrobe during the performance included an all-leather look, a custom design by Hervé Léger and Max Azria, with knee-high boots and a mini fur bolero. After "Give Me All Your Luvin'", she left the stage early for a costume change. A video interlude called "Turning Up the Hits" started, where excerpts of "Holiday", "Into the Groove", "Lucky Star", "Like a Virgin", "4 Minutes", "Ray of Light" and "Music" were played. Madonna appeared on the stage with a guitar and started singing the song. She was accompanied by two guitarists on the steps, which moved up-and-down. In the middle of the track, she invited the audience to sing-along with her.

Jordan Levin from The Miami Herald called the performance "gutsy", and labeled it as "an anthem for [Madonna] and pop music". Glenn Gamboa from Newsday wrote that the "aggressively peppy" performances of the song, along with "Give Me All Your Luvin'" was one of the most joyous moments of the show, and it could have been extended more. "Turn Up the Radio" was also the opening song for Madonna's one-stop performance for 45 minutes at Paris' Olympia music hall. The performance of the song at the November 19–20, 2012, shows in Miami, at the American Airlines Arena were recorded and released in Madonna's fourth live album, MDNA World Tour.

== Track listing and formats ==
- Digital Remixes EP
1. "Turn Up the Radio" (Offer Nissim Remix) – 7:28
2. "Turn Up the Radio" (Martin Solveig Club Mix) – 5:31
3. "Turn Up the Radio" (R3hab Remix) – 5:41
4. "Turn Up the Radio" (Madonna vs. Laidback Luke) featuring Far East Movement – 3:23
- Beatport Digital Remixes
1. "Turn Up the Radio" (Offer Nissim Remix) – 7:28
2. "Turn Up the Radio" (Martin Solveig Club Mix) – 5:31
3. "Turn Up the Radio" (R3hab Remix) – 5:41
4. "Turn Up the Radio" (Madonna vs. Laidback Luke Alternative Remix) featuring Far East Movement – 6:02
5. "Turn Up the Radio" (Album Version) – 3:46
6. "Turn Up the Radio" (Instrumental) – 3:46

== Credits and personnel ==
Credits and personnel adapted from MDNA album liner notes.

=== Management ===
- Recorded at MSR Studios, New York City and Sarm West Studios, London
- Webo Girl Publishing, Inc. (ASCAP), EMI Music Publishing France (SACEM)

=== Personnel ===
- Madonna – lead vocals, songwriter, producer
- Martin Solveig – songwriter, producer, synths, drums, instruments
- Jade Williams – songwriter
- Michael Tordjman – songwriter, synths
- Demacio "Demo" Castellon – recording, mixing for The Demolition Crew
- Philippe Weiss – recording
- Graham Archer – recording
- Jason "Metal" Donkersgoed – additional editing for The Demolition Crew
- Angie Teo – mixing assistant

== Charts ==
=== Weekly charts ===
Chart (2012)	Peak position
Belgium (Ultratip Bubbling Under Flanders)	20
Belgium Dance (Ultratop Flanders)	2
Belgium (Ultratip Bubbling Under Wallonia)	13
Belgium Dance (Ultratop Wallonia)	34
Global Dance Songs (Billboard)	17
Italy (FIMI)	58
Italy Airplay (EarOne)	15
Japan Hot 100 (Billboard)	68
Spain (Promusicae)	30
South Korea International (Gaon)	125
UK Singles (Official Charts Company)	175
US Dance Club Songs (Billboard)	1
US Dance Singles Sales (Billboard)	2
US Hot Singles Sales (Billboard)	3

=== Year-end charts ===
Chart (2012)	Position
US Dance Club Songs (Billboard)	33
US Dance Singles Sales (Billboard)	21
US Hot Singles Sales (Billboard)	38

== Certifications ==
Certifications for "Turn Up the Radio"
Region	Certification	Certified units/sales
Brazil (Pro-Música Brasil)	Platinum	60,000^{‡}
^{‡} Sales+streaming figures based on certification alone.

== Release history ==
Region	Date	Format	Label
Italy	June 29, 2012	Contemporary hit radio	Interscope
Australia	August 3, 2012	Digital download – Remixes	Interscope
New Zealand	August 3, 2012	Digital download – Remixes	Interscope
United Kingdom	August 5, 2012	Digital download – Remixes	Interscope
Mexico	August 7, 2012	Digital download – Remixes	Interscope
United States	August 7, 2012	Digital download – Remixes	Interscope
Germany	August 17, 2012	Digital download – Remixes	Interscope
United States	September 25, 2012	Contemporary hit radio	Interscope

== See also ==
- Artists with the most number-ones on the U.S. Dance Club Songs chart
- List of Billboard Dance Club Songs number ones of 2012
