= Bodyparts (album) =

Studio album by Dragonette
- Released: September 22, 2012
- Recorded: Malvern Airlines (London, England); Burnt River Cabin (Kinmount, Canada); Urca72 (Rio de Janeiro, Brazil)
- Genre: Electropop
- Length: 41:27
- Label: Dragonette, Inc.
- Producer: Rene Arsenault; Davey Badiuk; Felix Bloxsom; Dragonette

Dragonette chronology
Mixin to Thrill (2010)	Bodyparts (2012)	Royal Blues (2016)

Singles from Bodyparts
- 1. "Let It Go" Released: April 2, 2012; 2. "Live in This City" Released: August 7, 2012; 3. "My Legs" Released: May 20, 2013

Bodyparts is the third studio album by Canadian electronic music band Dragonette, self-released on September 22, 2012 by Dragonette, Inc.. The album was nominated for Dance Recording of the Year at the Juno Awards of 2013.

== Background and recording ==
Recording sessions took place in London, England; Kinmount, Canada; and Rio de Janeiro, Brazil. Lead singer Martina Sorbara listened to a Phoebe Snow album the entire period the band was making the album. She stated, "I find that when we're writing I think I'm more inspired by hearing something that's really different from our sound and then thinking about how that would work in conjunction with what we do. Like hearing an old 70s smooth music track and thinking, 'what would happen if we tried incorporating this into an electropop track?' But really there's not a clear line to what we do."

The band decided to name the album Bodyparts because it often mentions body parts in the lyrics. Dragonette announced the title on June 21, 2012. Sorbara remarked that she saw the word as "something musical, beautiful and sexual."

The band released the album's artwork on July 25. In mid-2012, the band launched a contest inviting fans to submit their own versions of the song "Untouchable", using Dragonette's original lyrics alone. The winning track was announced on September 7, and will be used as a B-side to a future Dragonette single.

== Release and promotion ==
Two tracks from the album, "Right Woman" and "Rocket Ship", were uploaded to Dragonette's SoundCloud page on March 5 and June 19, 2012, respectively. The band posted the official sampler for Bodyparts online on September 4, 2012. On September 11, the album was officially streamed in full on The Hype Machine.

"Let It Go" was released as the album's lead single on April 2, 2012. It reached number twenty-three on the Canadian Hot 100, becoming the band's highest-peaking solo single on the chart to date. The album's second single, "Live in This City", was released on August 7, 2012, charting at number sixty-five in Canada. "My Legs" was released on May 20, 2013 as the third and final single from the album.

To promote the album, Dragonette embarked on a North American fall tour, which kicked off at the Red River Exhibition in Winnipeg on June 23, 2012 and ended at Babylon in Ottawa on October 20. The trio also performed "Let It Go" and "Hello" on Good Morning America's Summer Concert Series in Central Park in New York City on July 20, 2012.

== Critical reception ==
Professional ratings
Review scores
Source	Rating
AllMusic	4/5 stars
Consequence of Sound	D−
Slant Magazine	3/5 stars

Allmusic's Heather Phares wrote, "With each album they've released, Dragonette have become more confident and focused, and Bodyparts is no exception; it should please not only longtime fans, but those won over by 'Hello'—though it might leave some listeners hungering for something quite as undeniable as that single." Greg White of So So Gay viewed Bodyparts as Dragonette's "strongest effort to date", commenting that the band "seem to have landed closer to the mark they've always been aiming for; a perfect blend of electro-pop glamour with a moderate dose of rock 'n roll swagger", although he felt that "[t]he album could use a little more variety". Jonathan Keefe of Slant Magazine opined that "[w]hile nothing on the album approaches the tawdry heights of past singles 'I Get Around' and 'Gone Too Far,' Bodyparts does improve in the latter half", which "showcases far more of Dragonette's distinctive personality." He continued, "Bodyparts is the first album on which Dragonette seem like they're maybe a little bit ashamed of themselves, hiding their most sordid tales behind some overly polite, anonymous dance tracks that are uncharacteristically vanilla."

== Track listing ==
All tracks are written by Dan Kurtz and Martina Sorbara, except where noted.

No.	Title	Producer(s)	Length
1.	"Run Run Run"	Dragonette	4:07
2.	"Live in This City"	Dragonette; Davey Badiuk^{[a]}	2:56
3.	"Let It Go"	Dragonette	3:32
4.	"Untouchable"	Dragonette	3:48
5.	"Lay Low"	Dragonette	3:11
6.	"Right Woman" (writers: Felix Bloxsom, Kurtz, Sorbara)	Bloxsom; Dragonette	3:59
7.	"My Legs"	Dragonette; Rene Arsenault^{[a]}	3:18
8.	"Giddy Up" (writers: Arsenault, Kurtz, Sorbara)	Bloxsom; Dragonette; Arsenault^{[a]}	3:17
9.	"Rocket Ship"	Dragonette	3:31
10.	"Riot"	Badiuk	3:04
11.	"My Work Is Done"	Dragonette	3:01
12.	"Ghost"	Dragonette	3:43
Total length:			41:27

iTunes bonus track
No.	Title	Length
13.	"Cuckoo"	2:17

Japanese edition bonus tracks
No.	Title	Length
13.	"Holidaisy"	3:37
14.	"Let It Go" (Laidback Luke Remix)	6:05
15.	"Let It Go" (Trippple Nippples Remix)	2:45
Total length:		53:54

Notes

- ^{^[a]} signifies an additional producer.
- LP pressings of the album omit the track "Rocket Ship".

== Personnel ==
Credits adapted from Bodyparts liner notes.

Dragonette

- Dragonette – production
- Martina Sorbara – vocals, keyboards, recorder
- Dan Kurtz – bass, guitar, keyboards, programming, vocals
- Joel Stouffer – drums, drum programming

Additional personnel

- Richard Andrews – design
- Rene Arsenault – additional production, keyboards (7, 8)
- Davey Badiuk – additional production (2); mixing, production (10)
- Felix Bloxsom – keyboards (6); production (6, 8)
- Simon Colin – mixing assistant (1–9, 11, 12)
- Dan Grech-Marguerat – additional vocal recording and production
- Stefan "Stef" Heger – mastering
- Shervin Lainez – photography
- Punkdafunk – management
- Redbastard – drum programming (2, 3, 7, 11)
- Sam Ryan – mixing (10)
- Philippe Weiss – mixing (1–9, 11, 12)

== Charts ==
Chart (2012)	Peak position
US Dance/Electronic Albums	17
US Heatseekers Albums	33

== Release history ==
Region	Date	Label	Format(s)
Australia	September 22, 2012	onelove	Digital download
Canada	September 25, 2012	Dragonette, Inc.	CD, digital download
United Kingdom	September 25, 2012	Dragonette Inc.	Digital download
United States	September 25, 2012	Dragonette Inc.	CD, LP, digital download
Japan	September 26, 2012	KSR Corp.	CD, digital download
