= Gone Too Far (Dragonette song) =

Single by Dragonette

from the album Fixin to Thrill
- Released: July 28, 2009
- Genre: Electropop; new wave
- Length: 3:40
- Label: Universal Music Canada
- Songwriter(s): Dan Kurtz and Martina Sorbara,
- Producer(s): Dragonette

Dragonette singles chronology
"Fixin' to Thrill" (2009)	"Gone Too Far" (2009)	"Pick Up the Phone" (2009)

"Gone Too Far" is an electropop/new wave song performed by Canadian band Dragonette. The song was written and produced by Dragonette for their second album Fixin to Thrill (2009). It serves as the album's second single, following the lead single, "Fixin' to Thrill". The song was released digitally in July 2009, and was later sent to radio in August 2009. "Gone Too Far" had its premiere when the band performed live at the Red Studios in New York City in October 2008. A music video for the song was made by friends of the band, and posted on the video hosting website YouTube.

Lyrically, the song is about a girl who starts out trying to seduce a man on a short-term basis, however, he shows a greater interest and she falls in love with him. The girl is trying to get the man into something much more long-term, but also trying to keep from scaring him off at the same time.

== Critical reception ==
After its premiere in October 2008, some critics expected the song to appear as a B-side, or bonus track, rather than an album track. Aside from being received well by fans, the song received mostly positive reviews from music critics, who favored the track for its 'hillbilly vibe'.

== Track listing ==
=== Digital Download ===
From CD Universe.

No.	Title	Writer(s)	Length
1.	"Gone Too Far"	Dragonette	3:40
