= Easy (Dragonette song) =

Single by Dragonette

from the album Fixin to Thrill
- Released: March 23, 2010
- Recorded: 2009
- Genre: Electropop; new wave
- Length: 3:47
- Label: Universal Music Canada
- Songwriter(s): Dan Kurtz and Martina Sorbara
- Producer(s): Dragonette

Dragonette singles chronology
| "Boys & Girls" (2009) | "Easy" (2010) | "Fire in Your New Shoes" (2010) |

"Easy" is an electropop/new wave song performed by Canadian band Dragonette. The song was written and produced by Dragonette for their second studio album, Fixin to Thrill (2009). It serves as the album's final single. The track was remixed by a number of producers, including Fabian and Buffetlibre, and the latter of which appeared on Dragonette's remix album "Mixin to Thrill".

== Lyrics and composition ==
Lyrically, the song speaks about staying in a bad relationship knowingly. The girl is making a plea to her lover; she's letting them know that she is not some weak, dependent person and that she has no problem leaving this person if they don't stop their destructive behavior.

== Critical reception ==
The song was received well by critics, some praising Martina for her vocals on the chorus of the track, and others claimed it to be one of the best tracks on the album, along with Pick Up the Phone.

== Music video ==
The official music video for the song premiered on Much, and was later uploaded to Dragonette's official VEVO channel. The video features Martina Sorbara appearing with different styling, such as hair, make-up and clothing, walking around a room full of bright lights and mirrors. A music video featuring the Buffetlibre remix of the song also exists.
