= The Night Out =

Single by Martin Solveig

from the album Smash
- Released: 2 April 2012
- Genre: Electro house; synth-pop
- Length: 4:15
- Label: Mixture Stereophonic; Mercury; Spinnin'; 3Beat
- Songwriter(s): Martin Solveig
- Producer(s): Martin Solveig

Martin Solveig singles chronology
"Big in Japan" (2011)	"The Night Out" (2012)	"Hey Now" (2013)

"The Night Out" is a song by French DJ and record producer Martin Solveig from his fifth studio album, Smash (2011). The song was released as the album's fourth and final single on 2 April 2012. The track has charted in Belgium and Germany.

== Music video ==
The music video for "The Night Out" premiered on 17 April 2012. The video features fellow DJs A-Trak, Dillon Francis, Sidney Samson, Laidback Luke, Madeon, Porter Robinson and Zedd. It reunites Solveig with She (Flo Lafaye) from "Hello".

== Track listing ==
- Digital download
1. "The Night Out" (A-Trak vs. Martin rework) – 3:52
2. "The Night Out" (Madeon remix) – 3:40
3. "The Night Out" (A-Trak remix) – 6:00
4. "Can't Stop" – 3:37
5. "Hello" (featuring Ish) [Why Are We Whispering remix] – 3:04
6. "Ready to Go" (initial SHE version) – 4:32
7. "Big in Japan" (Les Bros remix) – 5:30
8. "The Night Out" (TheFatRat remix) – 5:17
9. "The Night Out" (Maison and Dragen remix) – 5:55
10. "The Night Out" (François-Xavier Mounoury and Matthew Adda remix) – 5:08
11. "The Night Out" (single version) – 4:15

== Credits ==
- Written and produced by: Martin Solveig
- Composed by: Martin Solveig, Michaël Tordjman
- Lead vocals, backing vocals, other instruments and programming: Martin Solveig
- Guitar: Jean-Baptiste Gaudray
- Additional synthesizer: Michaël Tordjman
- Mixed by: Martin Solveig and Philippe Weiss at Red Room Studio, Suresnes

== Charts ==
Chart (2012)	Peak position
Belgium (Ultratop 50 Flanders)	23
Belgium (Ultratop 50 Wallonia)	22
Czech Republic (Rádio – Top 100)	22
France (SNEP)	78
Germany (GfK)	71
Romania (Romanian Top 100)	74
Scotland (OCC)	27
UK Dance (OCC)	5
UK Singles (OCC)	36
US Dance Club Songs (Billboard)	1

=== Year-end charts ===
Chart (2012)	Position
US Billboard Hot Dance Club Songs	26

== Release history ==
Country	Date	Format	Label
Belgium	2 April 2012	Digital download	Temps D'Avance
France	2 April 2012	Digital download	Temps D'Avance
Germany	6 April 2012	Digital download	Kontor
United Kingdom	20 May 2012	Digital download	All Around the World
Ireland	20 May 2012	Digital download	All Around the World

== See also ==
- List of number-one dance singles of 2012 (U.S.)
