= Vitiello =

Vitiello is an Italian surname. Notable people with the surname include:

- Cory Vitiello, Canadian restaurateur and celebrity chef
- Francesco Vitiello (born 1981), Italian actor
- Gennaro Vitiello (1929–1985), Italian stage actor and director
- Joe Vitiello (born 1970), American baseball player
- Leandro Vitiello (born 1985), Italian footballer
- it:Pasquale Vitiello (1912–1962), Italian painter
- Roberto Vitiello (born 1983), Italian footballer
- Ronald Vitiello (born 1963), American law enforcement official
- Sandro Vitiello (born 1958), American football player
- Stephen Vitiello, American musician
