= Fixin to Thrill =

2009 studio album by Dragonette

Studio album by Dragonette
- Released: September 25, 2009
- Studio: Estudio Pau Claris (Barcelona); Grandma Oda's House, Vespa Music Group (Toronto); Malvern Airlines (London); Two Sticks (Seattle)
- Genre: Electropop
- Length: 42:41
- Label: Universal Music Canada
- Producer: Black Wrappers

Dragonette chronology
Galore (2007)	Fixin to Thrill (2009)	Mixin to Thrill (2010)

Singles from Fixin to Thrill
- 1. "Fixin to Thrill" Released: May 26, 2009; 2. "Gone Too Far" Released: July 28, 2009; 3. "Pick Up the Phone" Released: September 23, 2009; 4. "Easy" Released: March 23, 2010

Professional ratings
Review scores
Source	Rating
AllMusic	4/5 stars
ChartAttack	3/5
Consequence of Sound	4.5/5 stars

Fixin to Thrill is the second studio album by Canadian electronic music band Dragonette, released on September 25, 2009, by Universal Music Canada.

== Track listing ==
All tracks are written by Dan Kurtz and Martina Sorbara, except where noted.

Fixin to Thrill track listing
No.	Title	Length
1.	"Fixin to Thrill"	4:07
2.	"Gone Too Far"	3:40
3.	"Liar"	3:56
4.	"Stupid Grin"	3:45
5.	"Easy"	3:47
6.	"Pick Up the Phone"	3:35
7.	"We Rule the World"	3:41
8.	"Big Sunglasses"	3:30
9.	"Okay Dolore"	2:33
10.	"Come On Be Good"	3:22
11.	"You're a Disaster"	3:32
12.	"Don't Be Funny"	3:13

Australian edition bonus track
No.	Title	Writer(s)	Length
13.	"Boys & Girls" (Martin Solveig featuring Dragonette)	Solveig	3:44

=== Notes ===
- LP pressings of the album omit the track "We Rule the World".

== Personnel ==
Credits adapted from the liner notes of Fixin to Thrill.

=== Dragonette ===
- Martina Sorbara – vocals (all tracks); keyboards (tracks 2, 10–12)
- Dan Kurtz – keyboards, programming (all tracks); guitar (tracks 1, 3, 4, 6–11); bass (tracks 2, 3, 5–12); backing vocals (track 8); acoustic guitar (track 12)
- Joel Stouffer – drums (tracks 1, 2, 4–6, 8, 10–12); programming (tracks 1, 3, 7–10); percussion (tracks 2, 5, 6, 8, 11, 12); keyboards (track 10)
- Christopher Hugget – guitar (tracks 7, 9)

=== Additional personnel ===
- Caitlin Abogouv – choir (track 4)
- Rich Andrews – design
- Black Wrappers – production
- Leo Cackett – band photography
- Jason Chhangur – mixing assistance
- Emily Cho – choir (track 4)
- Jacqueline Cohen – choir (track 4)
- Brian Crone – saxophone (track 1)
- Perry Curties – photography
- Chris Gehringer – mastering
- Evangeline Gogou – choir (track 4)
- Alison Goldlist – choir (track 4)
- Dan Grech-Marguerat – mixing
- Mira Korngold – choir (track 4)
- Yaela Korngold – choir (track 4)
- Jackson Long – assistant recording
- Rob Mee – trombone (track 1)
- Punkdafunk Inc – management
- Sara Quin – backing vocals (track 9)
- Eric Ratz – drum recording
- Joseph Shabason – saxophone (track 1)
- Will Stapleton – guitar (tracks 2, 4, 5, 8)
- Kurt Swinghammer – guitar (track 1)

== Charts ==
Chart performance
Chart (2009–2010)	Peak position
Canadian Albums (Nielsen SoundScan)	63
US Heatseekers Albums (Billboard)	37
US Top Dance Albums (Billboard)	21

== Release history ==
Release dates and formats
Region	Date	Format	Label	Ref.
Australia	September 25, 2009	Digital download	Bandroom	
Canada	September 29, 2009	CD; digital download	Universal	
Australia	October 2, 2009	CD	Bandroom	
United States	October 27, 2009	Digital download	I Surrender	
United States	November 18, 2009	CD	I Surrender	
Canada	November 27, 2012	LP	Universal	
