= Fixin to Thrill (song) =

Single by Dragonette

from the album Fixin to Thrill
- Released: May 26, 2009 (Canada)
- Genre: Electropop; new wave
- Length: 4:07
- Label: Universal Music Canada
- Songwriter(s): Dan Kurtz and Martina Sorbara
- Producer(s): Dragonette

Dragonette singles chronology
"Take It Like A Man" (2007)	"Fixin to Thrill" (2009)	"Gone Too Far" (2009)

"Fixin to Thrill" is an electropop/new wave song performed by Canadian band Dragonette. The song was written and produced by Dragonette for their second album Fixin to Thrill (2009). It was released as the album's lead single in May 2009.

== Music video ==
The video features lead singer Martina Sorbara as some sort of golem created by a group of children. Once brought to life, the children dance with and customize their creation in a suburban home. The video concludes with the children's parents attempting to destroy Sorbara unsuccessfully. The fourth wall is frequently broken during the duration of the video by integrating behind the scenes turmoil into the main story.

== Track listing ==
=== Digital Remix EP ===
(Released May 26, 2009)

No.	Title	Length
1.	"Fixin' to Thrill"	4:07
2.	"Fixin' to Thrill (Radio Edit)"	3:22
3.	"Fixin' to Thrill (Don Diablo remix)"	7:01
4.	"Fixin' to Thrill (Don Diablo remix dub)"	7:01
5.	"Fixin' to Thrill (Automatic Panic vs. DJ Cat NYC remix)"	6:06
