= Ready 2 Go =

2011 single by Martin Solveig

Single by Martin Solveig featuring Kele

from the album Smash
- Released: 28 March 2011
- Genre: Electro house; dubstep
- Length: 4:25
- Label: Mixture Stereophonic; Mercury; Spinnin'; 3Beat
- Songwriters: Martin Solveig; Kele Okereke
- Producer: Martin Solveig

Martin Solveig singles chronology
"Hello" (2010)	"Ready 2 Go" (2011)	"Big in Japan" (2011)

Kele singles chronology
"On the Lam" (2010)	"Ready 2 Go" (2011)	"What Did I Do?" (2011)

Music video
- "Ready 2 Go" on YouTube

" Ready 2 Go" is a song performed by French DJ and record producer Martin Solveig from his fifth studio album, Smash (2011). It features vocals from British singer Kele Okereke. The dubstep-influenced song was released as the album's second single on 28 March 2011. It peaked at number 20 on the French Singles Chart. It is a secondary theme song of the 2011 Copa América tournament. The song has been featured in the episode "Disturbing Behavior" of The Vampire Diaries, on its sister show The Secret Circle in the episode "Masked" and Launch Trailer of Forza Horizon. The Hardwell remix of the song was used for the Iceland sponsorship advert for the 2011 series of I'm a Celebrity...Get Me Out of Here!

== Music video ==
The music video for the song was uploaded to YouTube on 4 May 2011. The entire 11-minute music video was shot in the Stade de France, during half-time of the football match between France and Croatia, with the participation of many of the 80,000 fans in the stadium. In the video, Solveig comes into the stadium with a majorette, sings on the tape "Ready 2 Go", then begins to dance. Later, he runs around the stadium and fans in the stands brandish square papers of different colors to form the words "Ready to Go".

== Track listing ==
- Digital download
1. "Ready 2 Go" (single edit) – 4:25
- German CD single
1. "Ready 2 Go" (radio edit) – 3:05
2. "Ready 2 Go" (single edit) – 4:25
- UK digital EP
1. "Ready 2 Go" (UK radio edit) – 2:32
2. "Ready 2 Go" (single edit) – 10:34
3. "Ready 2 Go" (club edit) – 6:27
4. "Ready 2 Go" (Arno Cost Remix) – 6:46
5. "Ready 2 Go" (Hardwell Remix) – 6:35

== Credits ==
- Written by Kele Okereke and Martin Solveig
- Composed and produced by Martin Solveig
- Published by EMI Music Publishing Ltd. and Temps D'Avance
- Lead vocals and backing vocals – Kele Okereke
- Instruments, programming, and lead vocals (Verse 1) – Martin Solveig
- Mixed and mastered by Philippe Weiss at Red Room Studio, Suresnes
- Back photography – Romina Shama

== Charts ==
Chart (2011)	Peak position
Austria (Ö3 Austria Top 40)	49
Belgium (Ultratip Bubbling Under Flanders)	15
Belgium (Ultratop 50 Wallonia)	41
Czech Republic Airplay (ČNS IFPI)	55
France (SNEP)	20
Germany (GfK)	45
Ireland (IRMA)	38
Netherlands (Single Top 100)	52
Poland (ZPAV)	4
Polish Dance Chart (ZPAV)	38
Slovakia Airplay (ČNS IFPI)	30
Spain (Promusicae)	43
UK Dance (Official Charts)	13
UK Singles (Official Charts)	48
US Hot Dance Club Songs (Billboard)	33

== Release history ==
Country	Date	Format	Label
Belgium	28 March 2011	Digital Download	Mercury
France	28 March 2011	Digital Download	Mercury
Netherlands	11 April 2011	Digital Download	Mercury
Germany	13 May 2011	CD single; digital download	Kontor
United Kingdom	26 June 2011	Digital download	3 Beat; All Around the World
