= Don't think. Feel !!! =

Single by Idoling!!!
- Released: July 27, 2011
- Genre: Japanese pop
- Length: 16:59
- Label: Pony Canyon
- Songwriter(s): PA-NON, Shihori

Idoling!!! singles chronology
"Yarakai Heart" (2011)	"Don't think. Feel !!!" (2011)	"Big in Japan" (2011)

"Don't think. Feel !!!" is the 16th single from a Japanese idol group Idoling!!!. It reached number 3 on the Oricon chart. It was used as an ending theme song the anime TV series Fairy Tail . and its coupling song "Koi no 20 Rensa!!" was used an Puyo Puyo!! 20th Anniversary support song under the name "Puyo Puyo Idoling!!!" with new formation consisting all Idoling!!! members. Idoling!!! #25 Kaoru Gotou did not participate on this single due to hiatus for six months since April 12, 2011.

== Track listing ==
=== Limited A-type edition ===
==== CD ====
No.	Title	Lyrics	Music	Arrangement	Length
1.	"Don't think. Feel !!!"	PA-NON	Shihori	KOUTAPAI	3:48
2.	"Koi no 20 Rensa!! ~Besobeso ver.~" (恋の20連鎖!!～べそべそver.～)	leonn	Hirofumi Hibino	Hirofumi Hibino	4:15
3.	"Alphabet de Kore Nanda!? ~Hokenshitsu Daisakusen~" (アルファベットでこれなんだ!?～保健室大作戦～)	leonn	Katsumi Ohnishi	Katsumi Ohnishi	5:08
4.	"Don't think. Feel !!! (Instrumental)"		Shihori	KOUTAPAI	3:48

==== DVD ====
1. "Don't think. Feel !!!" promotion video.
2. Making-of video.

=== Limited B-type edition ===
==== CD ====
No.	Title	Lyrics	Music	Arrangement	Length
1.	"Don't think. Feel !!!"	PA-NON	Shihori	KOUTAPAI	3:48
2.	"Koi no 20 Rensa!! ~Garagara ver.~" (恋の20連鎖!!～がらがらver.～)	leonn	Hirofumi Hibino	Hirofumi Hibino	4:15
3.	"Alphabet de Kore Nanda!? ~Hokenshitsu Daisakusen~" (アルファベットでこれなんだ!?～保健室大作戦～)	leonn	Katsumi Ohnishi	Katsumi Ohnishi	5:08
4.	"Don't think. Feel !!! (Instrumental)"		Shihori	KOUTAPAI	3:48

==== DVD ====
1. Fairy Tail credit-less ending video.

=== Normal edition ===
==== CD ====
No.	Title	Lyrics	Music	Arrangement	Length
1.	"Don't think. Feel !!!"	PA-NON	Shihori	KOUTAPAI	3:48
2.	"Koi no 20 Rensa!! ~Matamata ver.~" (恋の20連鎖!!～またまたver.～)	leonn	Hirofumi Hibino	Hirofumi Hibino	4:15
3.	"Alphabet de Kore Nanda!? ~Hokenshitsu Daisakusen~" (アルファベットでこれなんだ!?～保健室大作戦～)	leonn	Katsumi Ohnishi	Katsumi Ohnishi	5:08
4.	"Don't think. Feel !!! (Instrumental)"		Shihori	KOUTAPAI	3:48
