= Live in This City =

"Live In This City"

Single by Dragonette

from the album Bodyparts
- Released: August 7, 2012
- Recorded: 2012
- Genre: Electropop; new wave
- Length: 2:56
- Label: Dragonette, Inc.
- Songwriter(s): Dan Kurtz and Martina Sorbara
- Producer(s): Dragonette

Dragonette singles chronology
"Let It Go" (2012)	"Live In This City" (2012)	"My Legs" (2013)

"Live In This City" is an electropop/new wave song performed by Canadian band Dragonette. The song was written and produced by Dragonette for their third studio album Bodyparts (2012). It was released as the album's second single in August 2012.

== Music video ==
The official music video for the track premiered September 17, 2012, on Dragonette's official YouTube channel.

== Charts ==
Chart (2012)	Peak position
Canadian Hot 100	65

== Track listing ==
=== Digital download ===
(Released August 7, 2012)

No.	Title	Length
1.	"Live In This City"	2:56

=== Digital Remix EP ===
(Released October 9, 2012)

No.	Title	Length
1.	"Live in This City (Madera Remix)"	5:31
2.	"Live in This City (Heren Remix)"	5:39
3.	"Live in This City (Database Remix)"	5:43
4.	"Live in This City (Davey Badiuk Remix)"	2:56
