= Chef in Your Ear =

2015 Canadian TV series

- Genre: Reality
- Created by: Justin Scroggie
- Starring: Greg Komorowski
- Country of origin: Canada
- No. of seasons: 1
- No. of episodes: 26

Production
- Executive producers: Henry Less, Lee Herberman, Daniel Gelfant
- Producers: Daniel Gelfant, Leanne Armano
- Running time: 60 min.
- Production companies: Shaw Media; HLP + Partners

Original release
- Network: Food Network Canada
- Release: August 31, 2015

Chef in Your Ear is a Canadian cooking competition television series, that premiered on Food Network Canada on August 31, 2015.

Hosted by Greg Komorowski, each episode of the series features a competition between two professional chefs who must "compete without cooking", by providing remote direction to an absolutely clueless cook. Using only a video monitor to watch the amateur's actions and a microphone to communicate direction into an earpiece, the chefs must guide the amateurs through the process of preparing a restaurant-quality meal in one hour.

The competing professional chefs are Jordan Andino, Devin Connell, Craig Harding, Rob Rossi and Cory Vitiello.

The series was purchased by Food Network Canada in December 2014, and production formally began in April 2015.
