= Eve (Idoling!!! song) =

"eve"

Single by Idoling!!!
- Released: November 23, 2010
- Genre: Japanese pop
- Length: 17:41
- Label: Pony Canyon
- Songwriter(s): leonn. Hirofumi Hibino

Idoling!!! singles chronology
"Poolside Daisakusen" (2010)	"eve" (2010)	"Yarakai Heart" (2011)

Eve is a Japanese-language song, and the 14th single, by Japanese idol group Idoling!!!. It reached number 5 on Oricon chart.

== Contents ==
Eve released in three types:

- Limited A-type (CD and DVD)
- Limited B-type (CD and original QT Card)
- Normal Type (CD only)

== Track listing ==
=== CD ===
No.	Title	Lyrics	Music	Arrangement	Length
1.	"eve"	leonn	Hirofumi Hibino	Hirofumi Hibino
2.	"StarGirl★StarBoy"	leonn	Tomoya Minami	Hirofumi Hibino
3.	"Caramel Latte Nomi Iko-!" (キャラメルラテ飲み行こー!; Kyarameru Rate Nomi Iko-!)	Kyasu Morizuki	Katsumi Ohnishi	Tooru Watanabe, Hirofumi Hibino
4.	"eve (Instrumental)"		Hirofumi Hibino	Hirofumi Hibino

=== DVD ===
1. "eve" music video
2. Making-of "eve" music video and CD jacket photo session

== Notes ==
1. "Caramel Latte Nomi Iko-!" sung by #3 Mai Endō, #6 Erica Tonooka, #7 Erika Yazawa, #8 Phongchi, #12 Yui Kawamura, #13 Serina Nagano, #14 Hitomi Sakai, #16 Ami Kikuchi, #17 Hitomi Miyake, #21 Kaede Hashimoto, and #26 Chika Ojima.
