= Let It Go (Dragonette song) =

Single by Dragonette

from the album Bodyparts
- Released: April 2, 2012
- Recorded: 2012
- Genre: Electropop; new wave
- Length: 3:32
- Label: Dragonette, Inc.
- Songwriter(s): Dan Kurtz and Martina Sorbara,
- Producer(s): Dragonette

Dragonette singles chronology
"Big in Japan" (2011)	"Let It Go" (2012)	"Live in This City" (2012)

"Let It Go" is an electropop/new wave song performed by Canadian band Dragonette. The song was written and produced by Dragonette for their third studio album Bodyparts (2012). It was released as the album's lead single in April 2012.

== Music video ==
The official music video for the track premiered May 2, 2012, on Dragonette's official VEVO channel, following a trailer for the video, which was released a week before. The video features a number of scientists, played by the male members of the band, along with extras, who kidnap Martina Sorbara and a group of extras to "leach happiness" from the unsuspecting victims, and condensing it into pills, to ensure happiness of every user.

== Track listing ==
=== Digital Download ===
(Released April 2, 2012)

No.	Title	Length
1.	"Let It Go"	3:32

=== Digital Remix EP ===
(Released April 16, 2012)

No.	Title	Length
1.	"Let It Go"	3:32
2.	"Let It Go (Laidback Luke Remix)"	6:05
3.	"Let It Go (The Knocks Remix)"	5:01
4.	"Let It Go (Faustix & Imanos Remix)"	5:48

== Charts ==
=== Weekly charts ===
Chart (2012)	Peak position
Canada (Canadian Hot 100)	23
Canada AC (Billboard)	22
Canada CHR/Top 40 (Billboard)	10
Canada Hot AC (Billboard)	9

=== Year-end charts ===
Chart (2012)	Position
Canada (Canadian Hot 100)	73

== Release history ==
Region	Date	Format(s)	Label	Ref.
Canada	April 2, 2012	Digital download	I Surrender!	
United States	April 2, 2012	Digital download	I Surrender!	
