= Trippple Nippples =

Japanese electropop band

Trippple Nippples (トリプル・ニプルス)
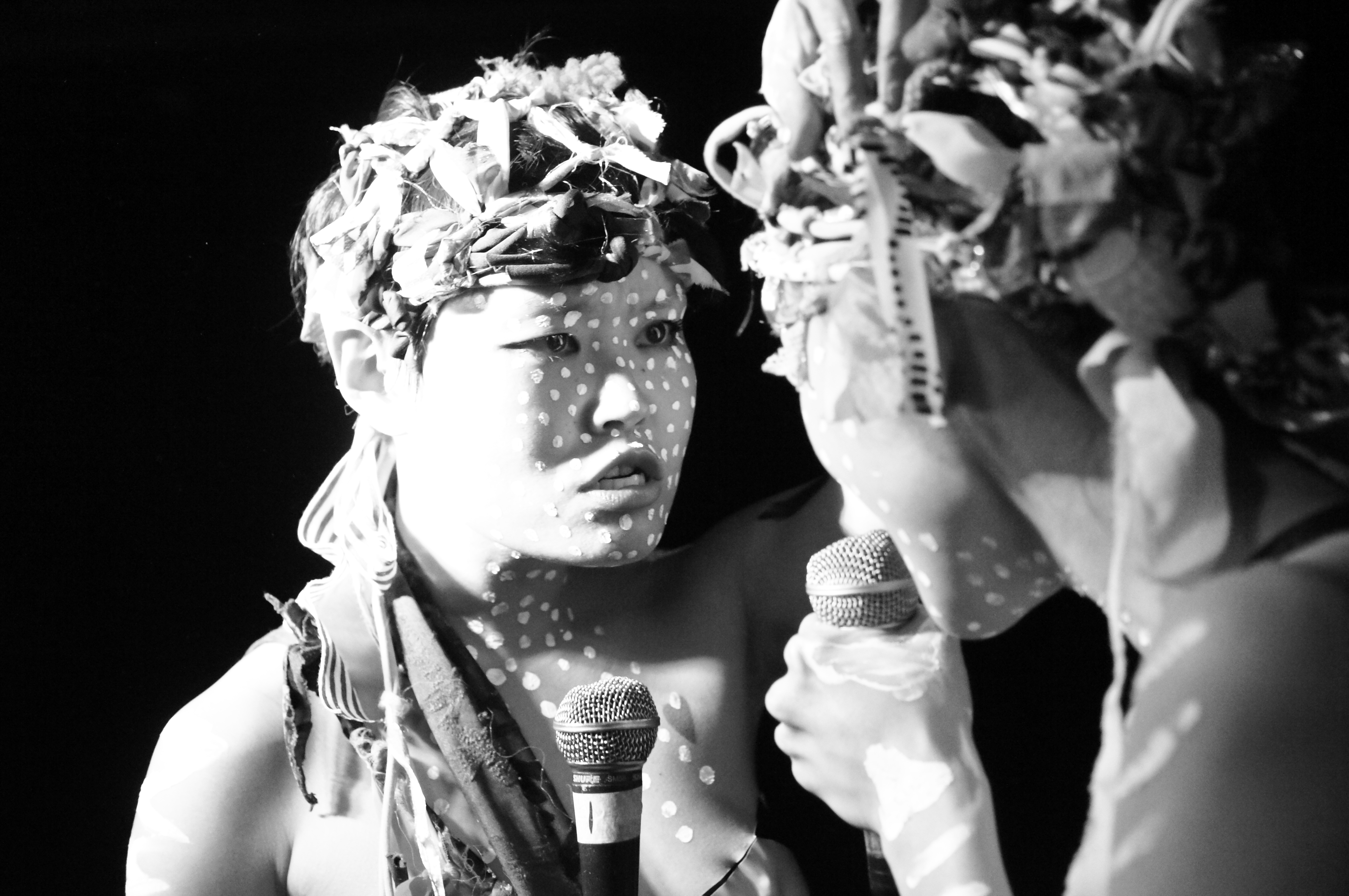
- Trippple Nippples performing live in April 2011.

Background information
- Origin: Tokyo, Japan
- Genres: J-Pop
- Years active: 2005–present
- Members: Qrea Nippple; Yuka Nippple; Nabe Nippple

Trippple Nippples (Japanese トリプル・ニプルス) is a Japanese electropop band from Tokyo. Famous for their unique performances, the band was formed in 2005. The artists going by the stage names Qrea Nippple, Yuka Nippple and Nabe Nippple do the singing and dancing. The Australians Joseph No and Jimi Mased perform on keyboards, synthesizers, guitar, bass and laptop. American Eddie Clay plays the drums. In an endorsement deal with the footwear brand Palladium Boots, Pharrell Williams hosted a documentary that featured Trippple Nippples' live show.
