= Boys & Girls (Martin Solveig song) =

Single by Martin Solveig featuring Dragonette

from the album C'est la Vie
- Released: 28 September 2009
- Length: 3:44
- Label: Mercury
- Songwriter: Martin Solveig
- Producer: Martin Solveig

Martin Solveig singles chronology
"One 2.3 Four" (2009)	"Boys & Girls" (2009)	"Hello" (2010)

Dragonette singles chronology
"Pick Up the Phone" (2009)	"Boys & Girls" (2009)	"Easy" (2010)

"Boys & Girls" is a song recorded by French DJ and record producer Martin Solveig featuring Canadian synthpop group Dragonette. It was released on 28 September 2009 as the first single from the reissue of Solveig's third studio album, C'est la Vie (2008), subtitled the Definitive Edition (2009). The song also appears on Solveig's fourth studio album, Smash (2011), and as a bonus track on the Australian edition of Dragonette's second studio album, Fixin to Thrill (2009).

== Music video ==
The music video for "Boys & Girls" was directed by Tristan Séguéla and shot at French fashion designer Jean Paul Gaultier's boutique in Paris, with Gaultier himself making a cameo appearance. In the video, Solveig and Dragonette lead singer Martina Sorbara are seen dancing with several men and women wearing black and white clothes. At one point, Solveig chases Sorbara to the rooftop of the boutique overlooking Paris, where they dance for a while.

== Track listings ==
- French CD single and digital download
1. "Boys & Girls" (Original Edit) – 3:44
2. "Boys & Girls" (Extended) – 6:23
3. "Boys & Girls" (David E. Sugar Remix – MS Edit) – 5:29
4. "Boys & Girls" (Les Petits Pilous Remix) – 4:29
5. "Boys & Girls" (Laidback Luke Remix) – 5:38
- Beatport digital download
1. "Boys & Girls" (Original Edit) – 3:44
2. "Boys & Girls" (Extended Mix) – 6:24
3. "Boys & Girls" (Laidback Luke Remix) – 5:38
4. "Boys & Girls" (Laidback Luke Dub Mix) – 5:39
5. "Boys & Girls" (Bart B More Dans Tes Rave Remix) – 6:48
6. "Boys & Girls" (Bart B More Siren's Call Remix) – 6:19
7. "Boys & Girls" (Les Petits Pilous Remix) – 4:28
8. "Boys & Girls" (David E. Sugar Remix – MS Edit) – 5:30
- Italian 12" single

A1. "Boys & Girls" (Extended Mix) – 6:24
A2. "Boys & Girls" (Bart B More Dans Tes Rave Remix) – 6:48
B1. "Boys & Girls" (Laidback Luke Remix) – 5:38
B2. "Boys & Girls" (Laidback Luke Dub) – 5:38

== Personnel ==
Credits adapted from CD single liner notes.

- Martin Solveig – songwriting, production, composition, lead vocals, backing vocals, all instruments, programming
- Dragonette – lead vocals, backing vocals
- Philippe Weiss – mixing (Studio Davout, Paris)
- Tom Coyne – mastering (Sterling Sound, New York City)

== Charts ==
Chart (2009)	Peak position
France (SNEP)	17

== Release history ==
Region	Date	Format	Label	Ref.
France	28 September 2009	CD single; digital download	Mercury	
Worldwide	13 October 2009	Beatport digital download	Mixture Stereophonic	
