= Jade Williams =

British pop singer (born 1988)

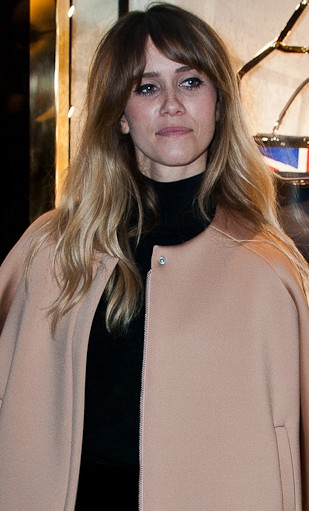
- Williams at the opening for Fendi store, May 2014

Background information
- Also known as: Sunday Girl; Whinnie Williams
- Born: Jade Williams; 21 May 1988 (age 38); Sidcup, Greater London, England
- Genres: Indie pop, alternative pop
- Occupation: Singer-songwriter
- Years active: 2009–present
- Labels: Island; Polydor

Jade Williams (born 21 May 1988 in Sidcup, Greater London, England) professionally known as Whinnie Williams, is a British independent pop singer, interior designer and presenter. She founded interiors brand Poodle & Blonde in 2018 and is host for BBC 3 show Flat Out Fabulous since 2020.

Williams grew up in Broxbourne. During her early teenage years, Williams was employed at a local pet shop where she worked every Sunday. Having not revealed her name to the other members of staff, Williams became known as Sunday Girl, which would later become her music alias. Growing up, Williams was always shy when it came to performing and singing in front of people, so her mother took her to see a hypnotist when she was 17, and it helped her to overcome the fear.

With her fear of performing gone, Williams joined many cover bands including a ska band, a jazz band, and a trio who did covers of '40s blues standards with a ukulele and double bass. Williams completed an Art Foundations course at University and studied set design at Wimbledon College of Art, but took a gap year during her studies to travel and, more importantly, focus on songwriting, as she was getting bored with only singing covers of other artists songs. During the gap year, she was discovered by a manager one night while singing in a night club, and he helped direct her to work with other songwriters, which led to her eventual signing with Polydor Records and Universal's Geffen Records in late 2009.

== Career ==
=== Music ===
Prior to her renderings of songs for the supermarket chain Aldi, Williams released her debut single as Sunday Girl, "Four Floors", through Polydor Records on 28 March 2010. A music video directed by Elisha Smith-Leverock was also released to accompany the release of the single. On 15 July 2010, she released her second single, "Self Control", a cover of the 1984 Raf song popularized worldwide by Laura Branigan. A music video, again directed by Smith-Leverock, was released to accompany the single release.

She supported Ellie Goulding on tour during November 2010, and played her first headlining show at London's XOYO on 15 December 2010. Her third single, "Stop Hey," was officially released through iTunes by Polydor in February 2011. She wrote and produced the song (along many others from her yet-to-be-released album) with Jim Eliot, who has also worked with Kylie Minogue, Ladyhawke, and Ellie Goulding. A music video for "Stop Hey" was directed by Smith-Leverock, and themes for the video came from superstitions about bad luck. In June 2011, Williams was featured on Martin Solveig's album Smash, performing "Let's Not Play Games," which she co-wrote. Her cover of "Love U More", originally by Sunscreem, was promotionally released along with its accompanying video in October 2011, but its commercial release was delayed indefinitely. That November, she also went on tour to support LMFAO on a few of their UK dates. Williams then recorded a cover of Pixies' "Where Is My Mind?" for Thomson's 2011 holiday TV campaign, and the single's success helped her to be signed by Universal's Island Records in early 2012.

Williams became one-half of DJ duo Ooh La La! in February 2012 with model Zara Martin . The pair have since streamed mixes 90s Hip Hop, R&B and Pop at night clubs and fashion parties in London and other cities in the UK. In March 2012, she co-wrote a song titled "Turn Up the Radio" for Madonna's twelfth studio album MDNA. Furthermore, she released "High & Low" from the official motion picture soundtrack of StreetDance 2. In February 2013, Williams announced the end of the Sunday Girl project, and released her first single and music video under the moniker of Whinnie Williams, "You Don't Love Me", in early 2013, later followed by "Break Hearts in Your Sleep". Both of these singles were released free via Williams' SoundCloud page, as was her first mixtape, Mix Tape Vol 1, released in December 2013.

=== Fashion ===
Fashion has been a huge part of Jade Williams' career alongside her passion for music. Her first role as a model came in October 2010 when she became the new face of River Island's Design Forum campaign. She has a fashion blog/vlog on MSN Life & Style, puts together all of her tour outfits and stage design, and even put out her own fashion line with Firetrap in September 2011. Williams cites her fashion icons as Coco Chanel and Karl Lagerfeld, and describes her own style to be masculine, tailored, and tom-boyish.

In 2011, a portrait of Williams was painted by British artist Joe Simpson, the painting was exhibited around the UK including a solo exhibition at The Royal Albert Hall.

== Discography ==
=== Extended plays ===
Title	Album details
Bad Girl	Released: 6 October 2014; Format: 12", digital download; Label: Night Beach

=== Mixtapes ===
Title	Album details
Mix Tape Vol 1	Released: 24 December 2013; Format: Digital download; Label: Independent
Mix Tape Vol 2	Released: 20 June 2014; Format: Digital download; Label: Independent

=== Singles ===
List of singles
Title	Year	Peak chart positions	Album
Title	Year	UK	Album
"Four Floors"^{[a]}	2010	—	—N/a
"Self Control"^{[a]}	2010	—	—N/a
"Stop Hey"^{[a]}	2011	—	—N/a
"Where Is My Mind?"^{[a]}	2012	133	—N/a
"High & Low"^{[a]}	2012	—	StreetDance 2 Soundtrack
"Too Strong"	2015	—	—N/a
"Real Damn Bad"	2016	—	—N/a

==== Featured singles ====
List of featured singles
Title	Year
"Not Alone" (DHP featuring Sunday Girl)	2012

=== Promotional singles ===
List of singles
Title	Year	Album
"Love U More"^{[a]}	2011	—N/a
"You Don't Love Me"	2013	Bad Girl
"Break Hearts in Your Sleep"	2013	Bad Girl

=== Guest appearances ===
List of guest appearances
Title	Year	Album
"Let's Not Play Games" (Martin Solveig featuring Sunday Girl)	2011	Smash

a Released under the Sunday Girl moniker.
