= Dragonette =

Canadian electronic music band

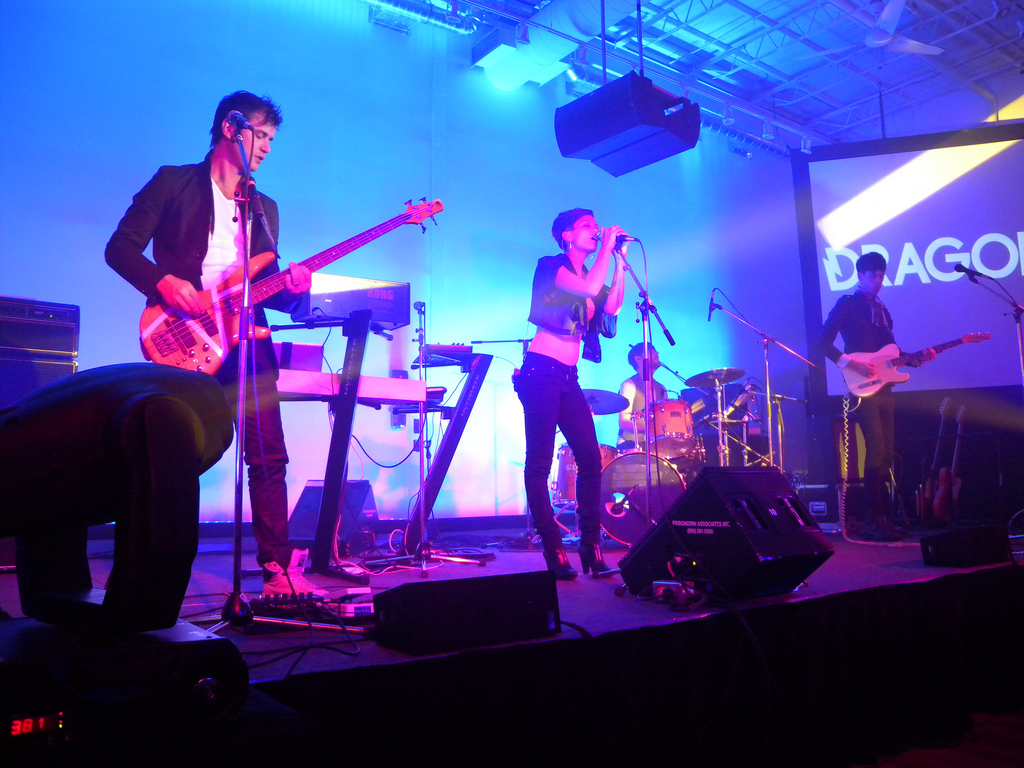
- Dragonette performing at the MSN.ca Launch Party on October 1, 2009

Background information
- Origin: Toronto, Ontario, Canada
- Genres: Electropop; synth-pop; new wave; dance-pop; dance-rock
- Years active: 2005–present
- Labels: Mercury; Universal; I Surrender; Dragonette Inc.
- Members: Martina Sorbara
- Past members: Dan Kurtz; Joel Stouffer; Simon Craig; Will Stapleton; Chris Huggett
- Website: dragonetteonline.com

Dragonette is the solo project of Canadian singer-songwriter Martina Sorbara. Originally an electronic music band from Toronto, Ontario, formed in 2005, the band consisted of Sorbara with her then husband Dan Kurtz as bassist and producer (also in The New Deal) and drummer Joel Stouffer.

Dragonette released a self-titled EP in 2005 before being signed to Mercury Records and relocating to London, where they recorded and released their debut studio album, Galore, in August 2007 to moderate critical appreciation. A second studio album, Fixin to Thrill, was released in September 2009. The group's third studio album, Bodyparts, was released in September 2012 and their fourth, Royal Blues, followed in November 2016.

They performed as a group until 2016, when both Kurtz and Stouffer left the band, with Sorbara continuing under the Dragonette moniker as a solo act.

Dragonette's fifth album, Twennies (and the first as a solo act) was released in October 2022.

== History ==
=== 2005–2008: Formation and Galore ===
Sorbara and Kurtz met at a Canadian music festival and formed a duo named The Fuzz, making music together in their basement recording studio for fun. The duo formed Dragonette after these initial recordings, and supported New Order on only their second live performance. In 2005, the band released the six-track Dragonette EP, prior to signing a record deal with UK record label Mercury Records.

Dragonette relocated to London to record their debut studio album, Galore, released on August 6, 2007, and toured the UK supporting local acts, including Basement Jaxx (with whom Sorbara also recorded the track "Take Me Back to Your House") and Sugababes and played headline gigs in small venues across the UK and Canada. British musician Will Stapleton replaced Simon Craig on guitar following the relocation. Dragonette filmed two music videos, one for "Jesus Doesn't Love Me" and another for "I Get Around". The former video leaked onto the Internet, while the other served as promotion for their first single release. "I Get Around" reached number 92 on the UK Singles Chart. A follow-up single release, "Take It Like a Man", fared no better, failing to enter the top 100 of the UK Singles Chart. "I Get Around" was released in the band's home country of Canada where it outperformed the UK release, peaking at number 57 on Billboard's Canadian Hot 100. After Galore failed to sell as expected, Dragonette parted ways with Mercury Records.

Dragonette received a nomination for New Group of the Year at the Juno Awards of 2008. Kurtz and Sorbara co-wrote and co-produced the song "Grab a Hold" for Cyndi Lauper's 2008 album Bring Ya to the Brink. That same year Will James Stapleton left the band, to be replaced by Chris Huggett.

=== 2009–2011: Fixin to Thrill and collaborations ===
Dragonette's second studio album, Fixin to Thrill, was released on September 29, 2009. The album was nominated for Dance Recording of the Year at the Juno Awards of 2011.

Dragonette have collaborated with several house DJs for releases, to varying degrees of success. Although Basement Jaxx's 2006 song "Take Me Back to Your House" only featured Sorbara on vocals, it was promoted by the band as a Dragonette collaborative. The band have since recorded several tracks with French DJ Martin Solveig, including "Boys & Girls" in 2009, "Hello" in 2010, and "Can't Stop" and "Big in Japan" in 2011; all of these tracks appear on Solveig's 2011 album Smash. Solveig and Dragonette won the Juno Award for Dance Recording of the Year for "Hello" in April 2012. In 2010, the band also collaborated with Kaskade on "Fire in Your New Shoes" and with Don Diablo on "Animale".

A double A-side single containing the songs "Our Summer" and "Volcano" was released digitally on July 27, 2010. On August 3, 2010, Dragonette released the compilation album Mixin to Thrill digitally, while a limited-edition CD was sold via the band's online store. The compilation contains three new songs—"Volcano", "Our Summer", and "My Things"—as well as several remixes from the previous year. In 2011, Dragonette worked with Girls Aloud member Nicola Roberts, co-writing and producing the single "Lucky Day" for her debut solo album Cinderella's Eyes.

=== 2012–2013: Bodyparts ===
On June 21, 2012, Dragonette announced the title of their third studio album, Bodyparts, which was released on September 22, 2012. The album's lead single "Let It Go" was released on April 2, 2012. "Rocket Ship", a track from the album, was made available as a free download on the band's official SoundCloud page. The album's second single, "Live in This City", was released on August 7, 2012.

In February 2013, Dragonette recorded a version of "Won't You Be My Neighbour?", the theme song to the American children's television series Mister Rogers' Neighborhood, for use in Target Canada's first ad campaign.

=== 2014–2017: Royal Blues ===
In 2014, Dragonette collaborated with Dutch producer and DJ Mike Mago on the single "Outlines". The band also released the single "Let the Night Fall" on June 16, 2015. The band's fourth studio album, Royal Blues, was released on November 11, 2016.

During the promotion of Royal Blues, Sorbara and Kurtz revealed that they had separated in 2013, shortly after performing at the ET Canada New Year's Eve Show, leaving Dragonette as just Sorbara.

=== 2020–present: Solo singles, Twennies and Revelation ===
In October 2020, Dragonette released a cover version of Sam Roberts Band song "We're All In This Together".

In 2021, Dragonette featured on several singles, including "Phantom" with Gianni Kosta; "Summer Thing" with Sunnery James & Ryan Marciano, and "Slow Song" with The Knocks.

In August 2022, Dragonette released "New Suit", which would become the lead single from her fifth album Twennies, released in October 2022. This album, her first release as the sole member of Dragonette, marked a move toward more acoustic sounds and personal lyrics.

In 2025, The Knocks and Dragonette again worked together, playing a stint of live shows together, including a scheduled performance at Electric Forest 2025, and co-releasing the singles, "Revelation", "Thorn", "Dreams", "Foolish Pleasure", and "The Hero." On June 6, 2025, they co-released the full-length album Revelation. The album featured synth-pop sounds and visuals inspired by 1980's corporate marketing, with drag queen Aquaria featuring in music videos for the singles.

== Discography ==
=== Studio albums ===
Title	Details	Peak chart positions	
Title	Details	CAN	US Dance
Galore	Released: August 6, 2007; Label: Mercury; Formats: CD, digital download	80	—
Fixin to Thrill	Released: September 25, 2009; Label: Universal Music Canada; Formats: CD, LP, digital download	63	21
Bodyparts	Released: September 22, 2012; Label: Dragonette Inc.; Formats: CD, LP, digital download	—	17
Royal Blues	Released: November 11, 2016; Label: Dragonette Inc.; Formats: CD, LP, digital download	100	—
Twennies	Released: October 28, 2022; Label: Dragonette Inc.; Formats: CD, LP, digital download	—	—
Revelation (with The Knocks)	Released: June 6, 2025; Label: Neon Gold Records; Formats: CD, LP, digital download	—	—
"—" denotes a recording that did not chart or was not released in that territory.

=== Compilation albums ===
Title	Details
Mixin to Thrill	Released: August 3, 2010; Label: Dragonette Inc.; Formats: CD, digital download

=== Extended plays ===
Title	Details
Dragonette EP	Released: 2005; Label: Self-released; Format: CD

=== Singles ===
==== As lead artist ====
Title	Year	Peak chart positions					Certifications	Album
Title	Year	CAN	BEL (FL)	IRE	NL	UK	Certifications	Album
"I Get Around"	2007	57	—	—	—	92		Galore
"Take It Like a Man"	2007	—	—	—	—	112		Galore
"Fixin to Thrill"	2009	—	—	—	—	—		Fixin to Thrill
"Gone Too Far"	2009	—	—	—	—	—		Fixin to Thrill
"Pick Up the Phone"	2009	28	—	—	—	—		Fixin to Thrill
"Easy"	2010	—	—	—	—	—		Fixin to Thrill
"Our Summer"/"Volcano"	2010	—	—	—	—	—		Mixin to Thrill
"Big in Japan" (with Martin Solveig featuring Idoling!!!)	2011	36	— (Note: "Big in Japan" did not enter the Ultratop 50, but peaked at number 37 on the Flemish Ultratip chart.)	—	—	118		Smash
"Let It Go"	2012	23	—	—	—	—		Bodyparts
"Live in This City"	2012	65	—	—	—	—		Bodyparts
"My Legs"	2013	—	—	—	—	—		Bodyparts
"Outlines" (with Mike Mago)	2014	47	18	77	26	8	BPI: Silver	Non-album single
"Let the Night Fall"	2015	—	—	—	—	—		Royal Blues
"Red Heart Black" (with Dada and Paul Harris)	2015	—	—	—	—	—		Non-album singles
"Feel This Way" (with Philip George)	2016	—	—	—	—	136		Non-album singles
"Lonely Heart"	2016	—	—	—	—	—		Royal Blues
"Sweet Poison" (featuring Dada)	2016	—	—	—	—	—		Royal Blues
"Galactic Appeal" (with Pretty Sister featuring Tobtok)	2016	—	—	—	—	—		Non-album singles
"Secret Stash" (with Mike Mago)	2016	—	—	—	—	—		Non-album singles
"Awake" (with Sonny Alven)	2017	—	—	—	—	—		Non-album singles
"Body 2 Body"	2017	—	—	—	—	—		Royal Blues
"Hope for Tomorrow" (with Autograf and Klingande)	2018	—	—	—	—	—		Non-album singles
"Tokyo Nights" (with Digital Farm Animals and Shaun Frank)	2018	97	—	—	—	—	MC: Gold	Non-album singles
"Faith in Love" (with Kokiri)	2018	—	—	—	—	—		Non-album singles
"We're All In This Together"	2020	—	—	—	—	—		Non-album singles
"New Suit"	2022	—	—	—	—	—		Twennies
"Twennies"	2022	—	—	—	—	—		Twennies
"Seasick"	2022	—	—	—	—	—		Twennies
"—" denotes a recording that did not chart or was not released in that territory.

==== As featured artist ====
List of singles as a featured artist, with selected chart positions, showing year released and album name
Title	Year	Peak chart positions										Certifications	Album
Title	Year	CAN	BEL Tip (FL)	FRA	NL	AUT	BEL (FL)	AUS	FRA	GER	US	Certifications	Album
"Boys & Girls" (Martin Solveig featuring Dragonette)	2009	—	—	17	—	—	—	—	—	—	—		C'est la Vie
"Fire in Your New Shoes" (Kaskade featuring Dragonette)	2010	69	—	—	—	—	—	—	—	—	—	MC: Gold	Dynasty
"Hello" (Martin Solveig featuring Dragonette)	2010	8	1	5	1	1	1	13	5	5	46	MC: 2× Platinum; ARIA: 2× Platinum; BEA: Platinum; BPI: Gold; BVMI: 3× Gold; RIAA: Platinum	Smash
"Animale" (Don Diablo featuring Dragonette)	2010	—	2	—	33	—	—	—	—	—	—		Non-album singles
"The Best" (LENNO featuring Dragonette)	2015	—	—	—	—	—	—	—	—	—	—		Non-album singles
"Pride of Lions" (Joey Stylez featuring Dragonette)	2015	—	—	—	—	—	—	—	—	—	—		Grey Magic
"One Night Lover" (Paul Harris featuring Dragonette)	2015	—	—	—	—	—	—	—	—	—	—		Non-album singles
"Leave a Light On" (Plastic Plates featuring Dragonette)	2017	—	—	—	—	—	—	—	—	—	—		Non-album singles
"Rich Girl" (DJ Licious featuring Dragonette)	2018	—	—	—	—	—	—	—	—	—	—		Non-album singles
"Unicorn" (Yash featuring Dragonette)	2022	—	—	—	—	—	—	—	—	—	—		
"Slow Song" (The Knocks with Dragonette)	2022	—	—	—	—	—	—	—	—	—	—		History
"—" denotes a recording that did not chart or was not released in that territory.

==== Promotional singles ====
Title	Year	Album
"Come On Be Good"	2009	Fixin to Thrill
"Merry Xmas (Says Your Text Message)"	2012	Non-album single

=== Guest appearances ===
Title	Year	Album
"Can't Stop" (with Martin Solveig)	2011	Smash
"Get Some Freedom" (Big Data featuring Dragonette)	2015	2.0
"Neck and Neck" (Zeds Dead featuring Dragonette)	2016	Northern Lights

=== Music videos ===
Title	Year	Director(s)	Ref(s)
"I Get Around"	2007	Wendy Morgan	
"Jesus Doesn't Love Me"	2007	Pablo Ros-Cardona	
"Take It Like a Man"	2007	Ben Taylor	
"Competition"	2008	Jeff Scheven	
"Fixin to Thrill"	2009	Wendy Morgan	
"Boys & Girls" (Martin Solveig featuring Dragonette)	2009	Tristan Séguéla	
"Pick Up the Phone"	2009	Drew Lightfoot	
"Easy"	2010	Drew Lightfoot	
"Fire in Your New Shoes" (Kaskade featuring Dragonette)	2010	Chic & Artistic	
"Let It Go"	2012	Drew Lightfoot	
"Live in This City"	2012	Wendy Morgan	
"Run Run Run"	2013	Drew Lightfoot	
"Giddy Up"	2013	Jeff Scheven	
"Pride of Lions" (Joey Stylez featuring Dragonette)	2015	Alison Honey Woods	
"Let the Night Fall"	2015	Justin Broadbent and Vinit Borrison	
"Lonely Heart"	2016	Sammy Rawal	
"Body 2 Body"	2017	Sammy Rawal	

== See also ==
- List of songs recorded by Dragonette
