= Animale =

Single by Don Diablo featuring Dragonette
- Released: October 10, 2010
- Recorded: 2010
- Genre: Electronica, Electro-house
- Length: 3:08
- Label: Ego Music, Sellout Sessions
- Songwriters: Don Pepijn Schipper, Martina Sorbara
- Producer: Don Diablo

Don Diablo singles chronology
"Who's Your Daddy" (2010)	"Animale" (2010)	"Make You Pop" (2010)

Dragonette singles chronology
"Hello" (2010)	"Animale" (2010)	"Big In Japan" (2011)

Music video
- "Animale" on YouTube

"Animale" is a song performed by electronic music DJ and producer Don Diablo featuring Canadian electropop group Dragonette. As of 2010, the song has reached #2 on the Flanders Ultratip chart and #33 on the Dutch Top 40 chart. The music video was released afterwards and currently has over a million views.

== Track listing ==
No.	Title	Length
1.	"Animale" (Radio Edit)	3:21
2.	"Animale" (VIP Mix)	3:28
3.	"Animale" (Club Mix)	5:33
4.	"Animale" (Datsik Remix)	4:09
5.	"Animale" (Oliver Remix)	5:50
6.	"Animale" (Skitzofrenix Remix)	6:15
7.	"Animale" (TWR72 Remix)	6:17
8.	"Animale" (The Prototypes Remix)	4:53
9.	"Animale" (Extended Dub)	4:54

== Charts ==
Chart (2010)	Peak position
Belgium (Ultratip Bubbling Under Flanders)	2
Netherlands (Single Top 100)	33
