= Smash (Martin Solveig album) =

Studio album by Martin Solveig
- Released: 6 June 2011
- Recorded: 2009–2010
- Genre: House
- Length: 37:38
- Label: Mixture Stereophonic; Mercury
- Producer: Julien Jabre; Martin Solveig; Michael Tordjman

Martin Solveig chronology
| C'est la Vie (2008) | Smash (2011) | Back to Life (2023) |

Singles from Smash
- 1. "Hello" Released: 6 September 2010; 2. "Ready 2 Go" Released: 28 March 2011; 3. "Big in Japan" Released: 24 October 2011; 4. "The Night Out" Released: 2 April 2012

Smash is the fourth studio album by French DJ and record producer Martin Solveig. It was released on 6 June 2011 by Mixture Stereophonic and Mercury Records. The album's lead single, "Hello" (a collaboration with Canadian band Dragonette), was released on 6 September 2010 and became a worldwide hit, topping the charts in five countries. "Ready 2 Go" was released as the album's second single on 28 March 2011 and features English singer Kele Okereke.

== Track listing ==
| No. | Title | Writer(s) | Producer(s) | Length |
|---|---|---|---|---|
| 1. | "Hello" (with Dragonette) | Martin Solveig; Martina Sorbara | Solveig | 4:41 |
| 2. | "Ready 2 Go" (featuring Kele) | Solveig; Kele | Solveig | 4:24 |
| 3. | "The Night Out" | Solveig | Solveig | 4:43 |
| 4. | "Can't Stop" (with Dragonette) | Solveig; Sorbara; Michael Tordjman | Solveig; Tordjman | 3:37 |
| 5. | "Racer 21" | Tordjman; Solveig | Tordjman; Solveig | 3:10 |
| 6. | "We Came to Smash (In a Black Tuxedo)" (featuring Dev) | Solveig; Dev; Julien Jabre | Solveig; Jabre | 3:23 |
| 7. | "Big in Japan" (with Dragonette featuring Idoling!!!) | Solveig; Sorbara | Solveig | 4:18 |
| 8. | "Get Away from You" | Solveig | Solveig | 2:24 |
| 9. | "Boys & Girls" (featuring Dragonette) | Solveig | Solveig | 3:44 |
| 10. | "Let's Not Play Games" (featuring Sunday Girl) | Solveig; Jade Williams; Jabre | Jabre; Solveig | 3:14 |
| Total length: | | | | 37:38 |

Digital deluxe edition, German limited edition and Japanese edition bonus tracks
| No. | Title | Writer(s) | Producer(s) | Length |
|---|---|---|---|---|
| 11. | "Ready 2 Go" (Arno Cost Remix) (featuring Kele) | Solveig; Kele | Solveig; Arno Cost^{[a]} | 6:46 |
| 12. | "Hello" (Sidney Samson Remix) (with Dragonette) | Solveig; Sorbara | Solveig; Samson^{[a]} | 5:18 |
| 13. | "Ready 2 Go" (Hardwell Remix) (featuring Kele) | Solveig; Kele | Solveig; Hardwell^{[a]} | 6:34 |
| 14. | "Hello" (Michael Woods Remix) (with Dragonette) | Solveig; Sorbara | Solveig; Woods^{[a]} | 7:18 |
| Total length: | | | | 63:34 |

US edition bonus tracks
| No. | Title | Writer(s) | Producer(s) | Length |
|---|---|---|---|---|
| 11. | "The Night Out" (Madeon Remix) | Solveig | Solveig; Madeon^{[a]} | 3:39 |
| 12. | "Hello" (Dada Life Remix) (with Dragonette) | Solveig; Sorbara | Solveig; Dada Life^{[a]} | 5:33 |
| 13. | "Ready 2 Go" (Hardwell Remix) (featuring Kele) | Solveig; Kele | Solveig; Hardwell^{[a]} | 6:34 |

US digital deluxe edition bonus tracks
| No. | Title | Writer(s) | Producer(s) | Length |
|---|---|---|---|---|
| 14. | "The Night Out" (Single Version) | Solveig | Solveig | 4:15 |
| 15. | "Hello" (Sidney Samson Remix) (with Dragonette) | Solveig; Sorbara | Solveig; Samson^{[a]} | 5:18 |
| 16. | "Big in Japan" (Les Bros Remix) (with Dragonette featuring Idoling!!!) | Solveig; Sorbara | Solveig; Les Bros^{[a]} | 5:30 |
| 17. | "The Night Out" (live at Studio Ferber) | Solveig | | 3:22 |
| 18. | "Hello" (with Dragonette) (video) |
| 19. | "The Night Out" (A-Trak vs. Martin Rework) (video) |

Notes

- ^{^a} signifies a remixer and additional producer

== Personnel ==
Credits adapted from the liner notes of Smash.

- Martin Solveig – instruments, production, programming (all tracks); lead vocals, backing vocals (tracks 3, 8, 9)
- Birdyben – design
- Tom Coyne – mastering (tracks 1, 3–10)
- Dev – lead vocals, backing vocals (track 6)
- Dragonette – lead vocals, backing vocals (tracks 1, 4, 7, 9)
- JB Gaudray – guitar (tracks 1, 3, 6, 8)
- Idoling!!! – lead vocals, backing vocals (track 7)
- Julien Jabre – instruments, production, programming (tracks 6, 10)
- Kele – lead vocals, backing vocals (track 2)
- Sunday Girl – lead vocals, backing vocals (track 10)
- Michael Tordjman – instruments, production, programming (tracks 4, 5)
- Philippe Weiss – mixing (all tracks); mastering (track 2)

== Charts ==
| Chart (2011–12) | Peak position |
|---|---|
| Belgian Albums (Ultratop Wallonia) | 37 |
| French Albums (SNEP) | 18 |
| German Albums (Offizielle Top 100) | 84 |
| Swiss Albums (Schweizer Hitparade) | 77 |
| US Top Dance Albums (Billboard) | 22 |
| US Heatseekers Albums (Billboard) | 36 |

== Release history ==
| Region | Date | Format | Edition | Label | Ref. |
|---|---|---|---|---|---|
| France | 6 June 2011 | Digital download | Standard; deluxe | Mixture Stereophonic; Mercury | |
| France | 13 June 2011 | CD | Standard | Mixture Stereophonic; Mercury | |
| Germany | 17 June 2011 | CD | Standard; limited | Kontor | |
| Germany | 17 June 2011 | Digital download | Standard; deluxe | Kontor | |
| Japan | 31 August 2011 | Digital download | Japan standard | KSR Corporation | |
| Japan | 7 September 2011 | CD | Japan standard | KSR Corporation | |
| United States | 28 August 2012 | Digital download | US standard; US deluxe | Big Beat; Atlantic | |
| United States | 18 September 2012 | CD | US standard | Big Beat; Atlantic | |
