= Pick Up the Phone (Dragonette song) =

"Pick Up The Phone"

Single by Dragonette

from the album Fixin to Thrill
- Released: September 23, 2009
- Genre: Electropop; new wave
- Length: 3:35
- Label: Universal Music Canada
- Songwriter(s): Dan Kurtz and Martina Sorbara
- Producer(s): Dragonette

Dragonette singles chronology
"Gone Too Far" (2009)	"Pick Up The Phone" (2009)	"Boys & Girls" (2009)

"Pick Up The Phone" is an electropop/new wave song performed by Canadian band Dragonette. The song was written and produced by Dragonette for their second studio album Fixin to Thrill (2009). It serves as the album's third single, released two days before the album. The song peaked at #28 on the Canadian Hot 100.

== Music video ==
The music video for 'Pick Up The Phone' was directed by Drew Lightfoot, and premiered September 9, 2009 on Dragonette's official YouTube channel. The video features Martina Sorbara and a group of girls vandalizing a school, vandalizing a laundromat, riding around doing doughnuts in a car, running around the city, and performing in a school gym. Also included in the video are scenes in which Martina Sorbara and her friends seduce a janitor, and pop a child's balloons.

== Charts ==
Chart (2012)	Peak position
Canadian Hot 100	28

== iTunes Remix EP ==
On February 23, 2010, a Remix Bundle was released to the Canadian iTunes Store. The Track listing is as follows.

Pick Up The Phone (Remix Bundle) - EP

1. "Pick Up the Phone (Arthmatix Remix)"
2. "Pick Up the Phone (Francis Preve Remix)"
3. "Pick Up the Phone (Daisy O'Dell Remix)"
4. "Pick Up the Phone (Richard X 12" Remix)"
