= Big in Japan (Martin Solveig and Dragonette song) =

Single by Martin Solveig and Dragonette featuring Idoling!!!

from the album Smash
- Released: 24 October 2011
- Genre: Electro house
- Length: 3:06
- Label: Mixture Stereophonic; Mercury; Spinnin'; 3Beat
- Songwriters: Martin Solveig; Martina Sorbara
- Producer: Martin Solveig

Martin Solveig singles chronology
"Ready 2 Go" (2011)	"Big in Japan" (2011)	"The Night Out" (2012)

Dragonette singles chronology
"Animale" (2010)	"Big in Japan" (2011)	"Let It Go" (2012)

Idoling!!! singles chronology
"Don't think. Feel !!!" (2011)	"Big in Japan" (2011)	"MAMORE!!!" (2012)

"Big in Japan" is a song performed by French DJ and record producer Martin Solveig and Canadian synthpop band Dragonette from Solveig's fifth studio album, Smash (2011). It features vocals from Japanese girl group Idoling!!!. The song was written and produced by Solveig, and released as the album's third single on 24 October 2011. "Big in Japan" charted in Belgium, Canada and the United Kingdom.

The song's album version has different lyrics than the single version.

== Music video ==
The music video for "Big in Japan" premiered on 18 October 2011. The video was shot just one week before the 2011 Tōhoku earthquake and tsunami. It closes with the caption: "This video was shot before the tragic events of March 2011. We share the grief of our Japanese friends and admire their courage throughout these difficult times. With this in mind and together, there are more reasons than ever to be Big in Japan!".

== Track listings ==
- Digital download
1. "Big in Japan" (feat. Idoling!!!) – 3:06
- UK digital EP
1. "Big in Japan" (radio edit) - 2:46
2. "Big in Japan" (single version) - 3:06
3. "Big in Japan" (club edit) - 4:50
4. "Big in Japan" (Ziggy Stardust mix) - 5:26
5. "Big in Japan" (Les Bros mix) - 5:30
6. "Big in Japan" (Denzal Park mix) - 6:44
7. "Big in Japan" (Thom Syma mix) - 5:51
- 12" single
1. "Big in Japan" (club edit)
2. "Big in Japan" (Les Bros remix)
3. "Big in Japan" (Denzal Park remix)
4. "Big in Japan" (radio edit)

== Credits ==
- Written by Martin Solveig & Martina Sorbara
- Composed & produced by Martin Solveig
- Published by Dragonette Inc., Fujipacific Music Inc. & Temps D'Avance
- Lead vocals & backing vocals - Dragonette & Idoling!!!
- Instruments & programming - Martin Solveig
- Mixed by Martin Solveig & Philippe Weiss at Red Room Studio, Suresnes
- Mastered by Tom Coyne at Sterling Sound, New York City
  - Idoling!!! appears courtesy of Pony Canyon Inc.

== Charts ==
Chart (2011–12)	Peak position
Belgium (Ultratip Bubbling Under Flanders)	37
Belgium Dance (Ultratop Flanders)	32
Belgium (Ultratip Bubbling Under Wallonia)	22
Belgium Dance (Ultratop Wallonia)	39
Canada (Canadian Hot 100)	36
Romania (Romanian Top 100)	61
UK Singles (Official Charts Company)	118
UK Dance (Official Charts)	21

== Release history ==
Country	Date	Format	Label
Belgium	24 October 2011	Digital download	Temps D'Avance
France	24 October 2011	Digital download	Temps D'Avance
United Kingdom	12 February 2012	Digital download	All Around the World
Ireland	12 February 2012	Digital download	All Around the World
