= Fire in Your New Shoes =

Single by Kaskade featuring Martina of Dragonette

from the album Dynasty
- Released: April 13, 2010
- Genre: Electro house
- Length: 2:39
- Label: Ultra
- Songwriters: Ryan Raddon; Finn Bjarnson; Mark Phillips; Martina Sorbara
- Producers: Kaskade; Finn Bjarnson

Kaskade singles chronology
| "Dynasty" (2010) | "Fire in Your New Shoes" (2010) | "Don't Stop Dancing" (2010) |

Dragonette singles chronology
| "Easy" (2010) | "Fire in Your New Shoes" (2010) | "Hello" (2010) |

Music video
- "Fire in Your New Shoes" on YouTube

"Fire in Your New Shoes" is the second single from Dynasty, an album by American house DJ Kaskade. It features the lead singer from Dragonette, Martina Sorbara. It was released digitally on April 13, 2010.

"Fire in Your New Shoes" was also featured in an episode of NCIS: Los Angeles, The Vampire Diaries and Criminal Minds.

== Charts ==
| Chart (2007) | Peak position |
|---|---|
| Canada Hot 100 (Billboard) | 69 |

== Certifications ==
| Region | Certification |
|---|---|
| Canada (Music Canada) | Gold |

== Track listings ==
- Digital download - single
1. "Fire in Your New Shoes" - 2:39
- Fire in Your New Shoes (Remixed)
1. "Fire in Your New Shoes" (Angger Dimas Remix) - 6:31
2. "Fire in Your New Shoes" (Joachim Garraud Vocal Mix) - 6:53
3. "Fire in Your New Shoes" (Joachim Garraud Dub Mix) - 6:23
4. "Fire in Your New Shoes" (Ming Radio Edit) - 3:59
5. "Fire in Your New Shoes" (Ming Extended Mix) - 4:59
6. "Fire in Your New Shoes" (Innerpartysystem Radio Edit) - 3:26
7. "Fire in Your New Shoes" (Innerpartysystem Mix) - 4:56
8. "Fire in Your New Shoes" (Innerpartysystem Extended Mix) - 6:30
9. "Fire in Your New Shoes" (Innerpartysystem Instrumental Mix) - 4:56
- Digital download - remix single
1. "Fire in Your New Shoes" (Sultan & Ned Shepard Electric Daisy Remix) - 7:11

== Credits and personnel ==
- Vocals – Martina Sorbara
- Guitar – Mark Phillips
- Lyrics – Ryan Raddon, Finn Bjarnson, Martina Sorbara
- Music – Ryan Raddon, Finn Bjarnson, Mark Phillips
- Label: Ultra Records
