= Cory Vitiello =

Canadian celebrity chef and restaurateur

- Born: 1979 (age 46–47); Brantford, Ontario, Canada
- Education: Stratford Chefs School
- Partner: Martina Sorbara
- Children: 1
- Culinary career
- Current restaurant
- The Chase
- Television show
- Chef in Your Ear

Cory Vitiello (born 1979) is a Canadian restaurateur and chef. He is the director of concept and culinary development at LFG Growth Partners. Vitiello was a competing professional chef on the show Chef in Your Ear.

== Early life and education ==
Vitiello was born and raised in Brantford, Ontario. He has two brothers. Monthly, his family would visit his Italian paternal grandparents in Fort Erie, Ontario.

His interest in cooking started at an early age. When Vitiello was 7 years old, he requested an Easy-Bake Oven for Christmas. He graduated from Stratford Chefs School. He completed an apprenticeship at Scaramouche Restaurant in Toronto.

== Career ==
Vitiello worked as a sous-chef at Cecconi's in Melbourne in 2003 and as the chef de cuisine at Drake Hotel from 2004 to 2007. In 2009, he was voted best new chef in Toronto by EnRoute. He was the national spokesperson for Thermador in 2010 and 2011. He has opened three restaurants, Harbord Room, THR & Co. and Flock. Vitiello was a competing professional chef on the show Chef in Your Ear. Vitiello was previously head of culinary development at Cactus Club Cafe. He is currently the director of concept and culinary development at LFG Growth Partners.

== Personal life ==
Vitiello was in a relationship with Meghan Markle from 2014 to May 2016. In September 2018, Vitiello's partner, Martina Sorbara, gave birth to their son.
