= Hello (Martin Solveig and Dragonette song) =

2010 single by Martin Solveig and Dragonette

Single by Martin Solveig and Dragonette

from the album Smash
- Released: 6 September 2010
- Genre: Electro-rock: Electro house
- Length: 4:42
- Label: Mercury
- Songwriters: Martin Solveig; Martina Sorbara
- Producer: Martin Solveig

Martin Solveig singles chronology
"Boys & Girls" (2009)	"Hello" (2010)	"Ready 2 Go" (2011)

Dragonette singles chronology
"Fire in Your New Shoes" (2010)	"Hello" (2010)	"Animale" (2010)

Music video
- "Hello" short version on YouTube "Hello" long version on YouTube

"Hello" is a song performed by French DJ and record producer Martin Solveig and Canadian electronic music band Dragonette, taken from Solveig's fifth studio album, Smash (2011). The song was released as the album's lead single on 6 September 2010 by Mercury Records.

It is Solveig's most successful single to date, reaching number one in Austria, Belgium (Flanders), the Czech Republic and the Netherlands, while charting within the top 10 in ten other countries. It reached number one on the Hot Dance Club Songs chart in the United States. Additionally, the song became Solveig's and Dragonette's first appearance on the Billboard Hot 100 in April 2011, eventually peaking at number 46 in June. It has since been certified Platinum by the Recording Industry Association of America (RIAA) for sales of one million units.

The song has been featured in 90210, The Vampire Diaries, Gossip Girl, Alvin and the Chipmunks: Chipwrecked, Let's Be Cops, Skins, Some Girls, Ted Lasso, and Swiped. It was also featured in Tim Hortons' 2013 ad for their 'Roll up the Rim to Win' promotion. It was used as the intro theme to the TV series Cheer! on CMT. The song appears in the video games Dance Central 3 and Just Dance: Decades of Hits.

== Music video ==
The music video is a tennis match scene played on the grounds of the French Open tournament in Paris. There are two variants: a long version which is the first episode of a series of music videos called "Smash", and a short condensed version.

The long version of the music video is divided into two chapters. The first chapter is an introductory dialogue and backstory (by Nelson Monfort) involving two of the main characters, a tennis player named Martin Solveig (as himself) and his tennis coach or manager Lafaille (played by DJ Grégory Darsa).

In Chapter 2 the song plays over a tennis match, recorded live at the main stadium court of the Roland Garros complex, court Philippe Chatrier. The short version consists of a re-cut version of this chapter. In the tennis match, Martin Solveig faces fellow DJ Bob Sinclar. As the match progresses Solveig struggles to gain any points, and is unable to win a game. With the score at 6–0, 6–0, 5–0, Sinclar is about to serve for matchpoint when "She" (Solveig's love interest, played by Flo Lafaye) enters the crowd, and Solveig decides he must win to impress her. He returns a serve but a lineswoman (Mathilde Johansson) calls the ball out, awarding the match to Sinclar. Novak Djokovic enters the arena and convinces the referee to overturn the call. Solveig makes a strong comeback, rallying to match point. However, Gaël Monfils comes into the stadium and kisses Solveig's love interest. Solveig sees this and decides to (literally) throw in the towel. That means he gives up and exits. In the long version only, the video ends with "to be continued" displayed on the screen. This portion of the music video was shot and recorded prior to the 2010 French Open commencing.

== Cover versions ==
The song was covered by the Baseballs on their second studio album, Strings 'n' Stripes. The Chipettes also covered this song as an exclusive iTunes bonus track on the 2011 Alvin and the Chipmunks: Chipwrecked: Music from the Motion Picture soundtrack album. A live performance by the Argentine electropop band Miranda! was also recorded, and later included on their double live-album, Luna Magistral (2012).

== Track listings ==
- French 12-inch vinyl
1. "Hello" (Club)
2. "Hello" (Dada Life Remix)
3. "Hello" (Bassjackers Remix)
4. "Hello" (Michael Woods Remix)
- French digital download
1. "Hello" – 4:42
- French CD single
1. "Hello" (single edit) – 4:41
2. "Hello" (club edit) – 5:33
3. "Hello" (Sidney Samson Remix) – 5:18
4. "Hello" (Bassjackers Remix) – 5:03
5. "Hello" (Michael Woods Remix) – 7:18
- German CD single
1. "Hello" (radio edit) – 3:11
2. "Hello" (club edit) – 5:33
- US digital download
1. "Hello" – 4:41
- US digital EP
1. "Hello" (Sidney Samson Remix) – 5:18
2. "Hello" (Bassjackers Remix) – 5:03
3. "Hello" (Michael Woods Remix) – 7:16
4. "Hello" (Michael Woods Dub) – 7:18
5. "Hello" (Dada Life Remix) – 5:33
- UK digital EP
1. "Hello" (UK radio edit) – 2:45
2. "Hello" (single edit) – 4:41
3. "Hello" (Michael Woods Remix) – 7:18
4. "Hello" (Michael Woods Dub) – 7:18
5. "Hello" (Sidney Samson Remix) – 5:18
6. "Hello" (Bassjacker Remix) – 5:03
7. "Hello" (Dada Life Remix) – 5:33
- Summer 11 Remixes
1. "Hello" (Caveat Remix) – 6:53
2. "Hello" (Dead Battery Remix) – 5:39
3. "Hello" (Relanium Remix) – 6:38
4. "Hello" (Ken Loi Remix) – 6:15
5. "Hello" (Awiin Remix) – 5:47
6. "Hello" (MINE Remix) – 6:35
7. "Hello" (Singularity Remix) – 7:12
8. "Hello" (Pace Remix) – 4:11
9. "Hello" (Why Are We Whispering Remix) – 3:04
10. "Hello" (Jeremy Ebell Remix) – 2:56

== Credits and personnel ==
- Written by Martin Solveig and Martina Sorbara
- Composed and produced by Martin Solveig
- Published by Dragonette Inc. and Temps D'Avance
- Lead vocals and backing vocals – Dragonette
- Other instruments and programming – Martin Solveig
- Guitar – Jean-Baptiste Gaudray
- Mixed by Philippe Weiss at Red Room Studio, Suresnes
- Mastered by Tom Coyne at Sterling Sound, New York City

== Charts ==
=== Weekly charts ===
Chart (2010–2011)	Peak position
Australia (ARIA)	13
Austria (Ö3 Austria Top 40)	1
Belgium (Ultratop 50 Flanders)	1
Belgium (Ultratop 50 Wallonia)	2
Canada Hot 100 (Billboard)	8
Canada CHR/Top 40 (Billboard)	6
Czech Republic Airplay (ČNS IFPI)	1
Denmark (Tracklisten)	33
France (SNEP)	5
Germany (GfK)	5
Hungary (Dance Top 40)	2
Hungary (Rádiós Top 40)	12
Ireland (IRMA)	6
Italy (FIMI)	7
Mexico (Billboard Mexican Airplay)	1
Mexico Anglo (Monitor Latino)	1
Netherlands (Dutch Top 40)	1
Netherlands (Single Top 100)	1
New Zealand (Recorded Music NZ)	5
Poland Airplay (ZPAV)	4
Poland Dance (ZPAV)	8
Poland (Polish Airplay New)	5
Romania (Romanian Top 100)	7
Scottish Singles Sales (Official Charts)	8
Slovakia Airplay (ČNS IFPI)	3
Spain (Promusicae)	17
Sweden (Sverigetopplistan)	31
Switzerland (Schweizer Hitparade)	10
UK Singles (Official Charts)	13
UK Dance (Official Charts)	2
US Billboard Hot 100	46
US Adult Pop Airplay (Billboard)	30
US Dance Club Songs (Billboard)	1
US Pop Airplay (Billboard)	19

Chart (2021–2022)	Peak position
US Hot Dance/Electronic Songs (Billboard)	11

=== Year-end charts ===
Chart (2010)	Position
Belgium (Ultratop 50 Flanders)	97
Belgium (Ultratop 50 Wallonia)	93
France (SNEP)	74
Italy (FIMI)	74
Netherlands (Dutch Top 40)	180

Chart (2011)	Position
Australia (ARIA)	73
Austria (Ö3 Austria Top 40)	5
Belgium (Ultratop 50 Flanders)	14
Belgium (Ultratop 50 Wallonia)	24
Canada (Canadian Hot 100)	11
France (SNEP)	72
Germany (Official German Charts)	24
Hungary (Dance Top 40)	8
Hungary (Rádiós Top 40)	65
Italy (Musica e dischi)	56
Netherlands (Dutch Top 40)	12
Netherlands (Single Top 100)	4
Polish Dance Singles Chart	21
Romania (Romanian Top 100)	24
Sweden (Sverigetopplistan)	86
Switzerland (Schweizer Hitparade)	26
UK Singles (OCC)	52
US Dance Club Songs (Billboard)	5

== Certifications ==
Region	Certification	Certified units/sales
Australia (ARIA)	2× Platinum	140,000^{^}
Belgium (BRMA)	Platinum	30,000^{*}
Canada (Music Canada)	2× Platinum	160,000^{*}
Germany (BVMI)	3× Gold	450,000^{‡}
Italy (FIMI)	Platinum	30,000^{*}
Mexico (AMPROFON)	Platinum	60,000^{*}
Netherlands (NVPI)	2× Platinum	40,000^{^}
New Zealand (RMNZ)	Platinum	15,000^{*}
Sweden (GLF)	2× Platinum	80,000^{‡}
Switzerland (IFPI Switzerland)	Platinum	30,000^{^}
United Kingdom (BPI)	Platinum	600,000^{‡}
United States (RIAA)	Platinum	1,000,000^{‡}
^{*} Sales figures based on certification alone.^{^} Shipments figures based on certification alone.^{‡} Sales+streaming figures based on certification alone.

== Release history ==
Release dates and formats for "Hello"
Region	Date	Format	Label(s)	Ref.
United States	22 March 2011	Mainstream airplay	Mercury	
