= Martina Sorbara =

Canadian singer-songwriter

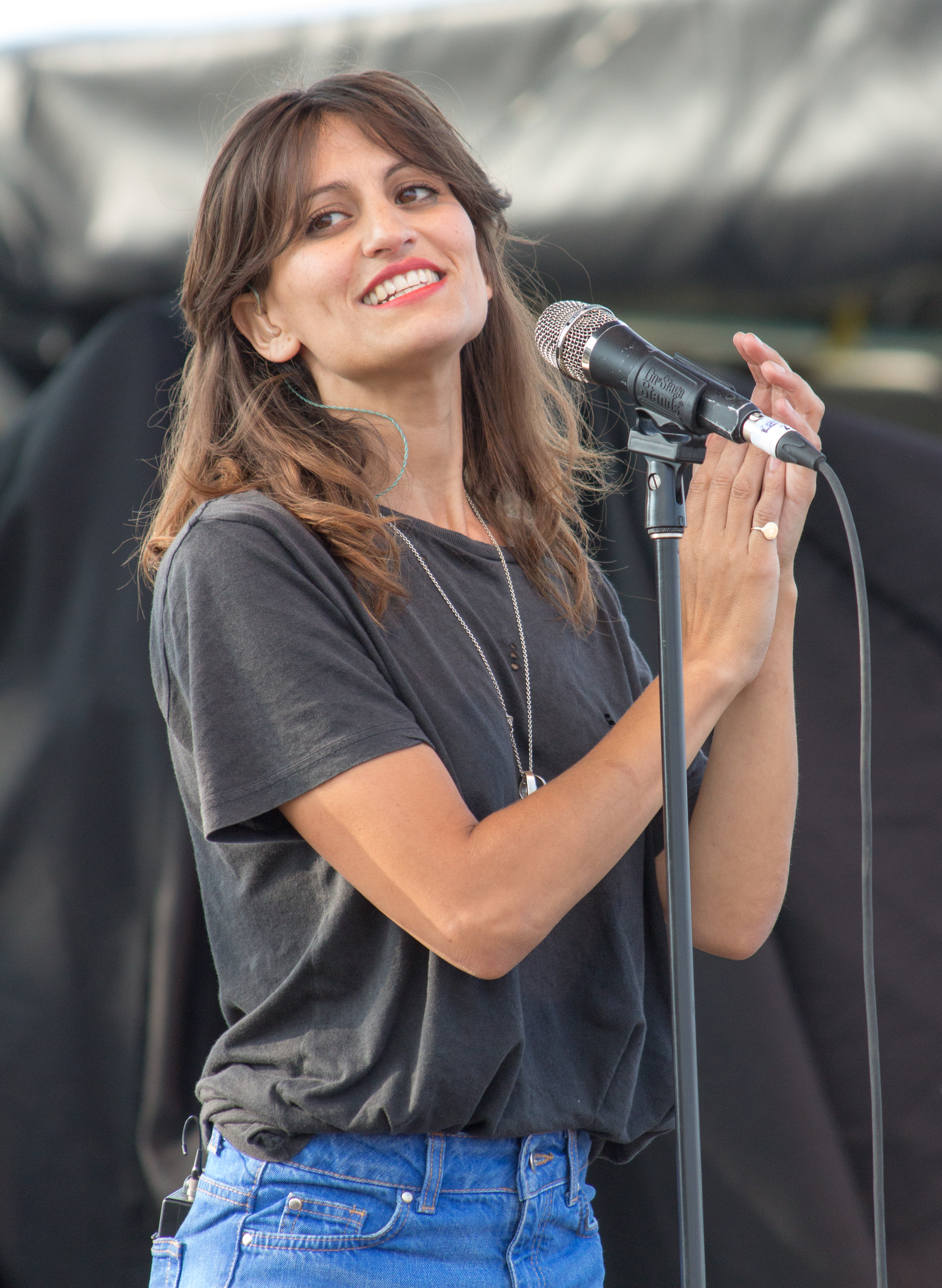
- Sorbara performing with Dragonette at the 2013 Festival of Friends

Background information
- Born: November 13, 1978 (age 48); Vaughan, Ontario, Canada
- Genre: Electropop
- Occupation: Singer-songwriter
- Instrument: Vocals
- Years active: 1998–present
- Member of: Dragonette

Martina Sorbara (born November 13, 1978) is a Canadian singer-songwriter. Initially a solo artist under her own name, she later became the frontwoman of the band Dragonette.

== Background ==
The daughter of Greg Sorbara, a former Member of Provincial Parliament and Minister of Finance in Ontario, she grew up in Maple, Ontario and attended the Toronto Waldorf School in Thornhill, Ontario.

== Career ==
Her debut album, Unplaceables, was released independently in 1998 and is no longer in print. During her early solo career, an early hook that often got media attention was that she sewed many of her own clothes and built her own guitars.

Sorbara's second album, The Cure for Bad Deeds, was released independently in 2000. An expanded version of the album, adding five newly-recorded tracks not present on the original independent release, appeared on Nettwerk in 2002. Both versions of the album were produced by Jian Ghomeshi.

She supported the second album with a national tour, performing on the folk festival circuit and as an opening act for Danny Michel and Sarah Harmer. Sorbara's main single from the album was "Bonnie & Clyde II", which also had a music video that got airplay on MuchMusic and MuchMoreMusic, reaching #26 on the MuchMusic Countdown, as well as making an appearance on the Women & Songs compilations and appearing in the film All I Want. The album was a nominee for Pop Album of the Year at Canadian Music Week's Canadian Independent Music Awards in 2003.

Sorbara recorded a version of the Christmas song "It's the Most Wonderful Time of the Year" for the 2003 Nettwerk compilation album, Maybe This Christmas Too?. That same year, she was featured on the soundtrack to Uptown Girls singing the song "Spinning Around the Sun". She can also be heard on the From the Girls compilations issued by Nettwerk that contained a new recording of a song called "Withered on the Vine".

She had begun working on her third solo album, which was tentatively slated for release in 2005, but abandoned the project after meeting Dan Kurtz of The New Deal at a Canadian music festival and forming an electropop duo with him. Initially named The Fuzz, that project evolved into Dragonette. She subsequently characterized her early solo music as sounding like it had been made for tampon commercials.

Sorbara co-wrote and sang in the 2006 Basement Jaxx single "Take Me Back to Your House". She also appeared in the video for the song. She was credited as Martina Bang.

In 2009, Sorbara was featured on The Henrys album Is This Tomorrow, singing on the track "Chair by the Window". In 2010, Sorbara performed the vocals in Martin Solveig's songs "Hello", "Boys & Girls" and "Big in Japan". She is also featured in Kaskade's song "Fire in Your New Shoes", which was released on April 13, 2010. In November 2010 she was featured in the song "Animale", which was the result of a collaboration between a Dutch DJ and a producer Don Diablo and Dragonette.

== Personal life ==
Sorbara was married to Dragonette's bassist Dan Kurtz, but announced their separation in May 2016.

In September 2018, she gave birth to her first child with her partner, the Canadian celebrity chef Cory Vitiello.

== Discography ==
- 1998: Unplaceables
- 2002: The Cure for Bad Deeds (Nettwerk)
