= Martin Solveig discography =

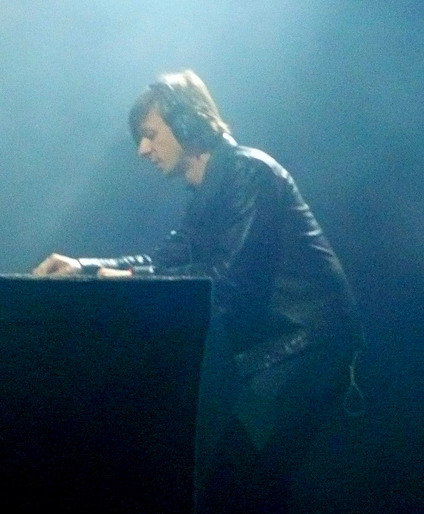
- Solveig performing at Pukkelpop in 2009
- Studio albums: 6
- Compilation albums: 1
- Singles: 31

The discography of Martin Solveig, a French DJ and record producer, consists of six studio albums, one compilation album and thirty-one singles (including one as a featured artist).

His debut studio album, Sur la terre, was released in June 2002. The album includes the singles "Madan", "Rocking Music" and "I'm a Good Man".

His second studio album, Hedonist, was released in September 2005, the album peaked at number 43 on the French Albums Chart. The album includes the singles "Everybody", "Jealousy", "Something Better" and "Rejection".

His third studio album, C'est la Vie, was released in October 2008, the album peaked at number 16 on the French Albums Chart. "C'est la Vie" was released as the lead single from the album on 21 January 2008. "I Want You" was released as the second single from the album on 15 September 2008. "One 2.3 Four" was released as the third single from the album on 22 December 2008. "Boys & Girls" was released as the fourth single from the album on 28 September 2009.

His fourth studio album, Smash, was released in June 2011, peaking at number 18 on the French Albums Chart. On 6 September 2010 he released the single "Hello" with Dragonette as the lead single from the album. It is Solveig's most successful single to date, peaking at number one in Austria, Belgium (Flanders), Czech Republic and the Netherlands, while charting within the top 10 in ten other countries. The song also peaked at number 13 on the UK Singles Chart. "Ready 2 Go" was released as the second single from the album on 28 March 2011. On 24 October 2011 "Big in Japan" was released as the third single from the album. On 2 April 2012 "The Night Out" was released as the fourth single from the album.

== Albums ==
=== Studio albums ===
Title	Album details	Peak chart positions					
Title	Album details	FRA	BEL (Fl)	BEL (Wa)	GER	SWI	US Dance
Sur la Terre	Released: 17 June 2002; Label: Penso Positivo; Format: Digital download, CD	—	—	—	—	—	—
Suite^{[A]}	Released: 24 June 2003; Label: Penso Positivo; Format: Digital download, CD	84	—	—	—	—	—
Hedonist	Released: 12 September 2005; Label: Penso Positivo; Format: Digital download, CD	43	99	—	—	—	—
C'est la Vie	Released: 28 October 2008; Label: Temps D'Avance; Format: Digital download, CD	16	99	23	—	59	—
Smash	Released: 6 June 2011; Label: Mercury Records; Format: Digital download, CD	18	—	37	84	77	22
Back to Life	Released: 20 October 2023; Label: Virgin EMI Records; Format: Digital download, CD	—	—	—	—	—	—
"—" denotes an album that did not chart or was not released in that territory.

=== Compilation albums ===
Title	Album details	Peak chart positions		
Title	Album details	FRA	BEL (Fl)	SWI
So Far	Released: 2006; Label: Interowners; Format: Digital download, CD	38	100	85

== Singles ==
=== As lead artist ===
Title	Year	Peak chart positions										Certifications	Album
Title	Year	FRA	AUS	AUT	BEL (Fl)	GER	ITA	NL	SWI	UK	US	Certifications	Album
"Madan" (with Salif Keita)	2003	37	—	—	64	—	17	87	66	—	—		Sur la Terre
"Rocking Music"	2004	47	39	—	64	—	—	82	—	35	—		Sur la Terre
"I'm a Good Man"	2004	—	—	—	—	—	—	—	—	57	—		Sur la Terre
"Everybody" (featuring Lee Fields)	2005	37	33	—	27	—	—	—	—	22	—		Hedonist
"Jealousy" (featuring Lee Fields)	2006	36	—	—	40	—	29	—	60	62	—		Hedonist
"Rejection"	2007	34	—	—	52	—	23	—	55	—	—		Hedonist
"C'est la Vie"	2008	—	—	—	59	—	—	—	63	—	—		C'est la Vie
"I Want You" (featuring Lee Fields)	2008	59	—	—	37	—	—	—	—	—	—		C'est la Vie
"One 2.3 Four"	2008	—	—	—	57	—	—	—	—	—	—		C'est la Vie
"Boys & Girls" (featuring Dragonette)	2009	17	—	—	—	—	—	—	—	—	—		C'est la Vie
"Hello" (with Dragonette)	2010	5	13	1	2	5	1	1	10	13	46	ARIA: 2× Platinum; BEA: Platinum; BVMI: 3× Gold; FIMI: Platinum; IFPI SWI: Platinum; BPI: Gold; RIAA: Platinum	Smash
"Ready 2 Go" (featuring Kele)	2011	20	—	49	41	45	—	52	70	48	—		Smash
"Big in Japan" (with Dragonette featuring Idoling)	2011	—	—	—	72	—	—	—	—	118	—		Smash
"The Night Out"	2012	78	—	—	22	71	—	—	—	36	—		Smash
"Hey Now" (with The Cataracs featuring Kyle)	2013	55	—	8	43	10	—	—	38	—	—	BVMI: Gold	Non-album singles
"Blow" (with Laidback Luke)	2014	—	—	—	80	—	—	—	—	—	—		Non-album singles
"Intoxicated" (with GTA)	2015	15	81	23	8	11	—	11	33	5	—	BEA: Platinum; BPI: Platinum; BVMI: 3× Gold; FIMI: Platinum	Non-album singles
"+1" (featuring Sam White)	2015	31	—	—	49	38	—	76	—	51	—	BPI: Silver; BVMI: Gold	Non-album singles
"Do It Right" (featuring Tkay Maidza)	2016	48	56	72	69	41	—	—	—	97	—	SNEP: Gold; BPI: Gold	Non-album singles
"Places" (featuring Ina Wroldsen)	2016	56	—	72	43	44	—	—	—	27	—	SNEP: Gold; BPI: 2× Platinum	Non-album singles
"All Stars" (featuring Alma)	2017	11	—	24	11	33	—	—	94	83	—	SNEP: Diamond; BPI: Silver; BEA: Gold; BVMI: Gold; FIMI: Gold	Non-album singles
"My Love"	2018	74	—	—	52	—	—	—	—	—	—		Non-album singles
"All Day and Night" (with Jax Jones and Madison Beer)	2019	82	—	—	52	85	—	79	85	10	—	SNEP: Gold; BPI: Platinum; BVMI: Gold	Snacks
"Thing for You" (with David Guetta)	2019	—	—	—	66	—	—	—	—	89	—		Non-album singles
"Juliet & Romeo" (with Roy Woods)	2019	—	—	—	69	—	—	—	—	51	—	BPI: Gold	Non-album singles
"Tequila" (with Jax Jones and Raye)	2020	—	—	—	—	—	—	—	—	21	—	BPI: Silver	Europa
"No Lie" (with Michael Calfan)	2020	—	—	—	—	—	—	—	—	—	—		Non-album single
"Lonely Heart" (with Jax Jones and Gracey)	2022	—	—	—	—	—	—	—	—	71	—		Non-album single
"Allo Allo" (with Raphaella)	2023	—	—	—	—	—	—	—	—	—	—		Back to Life
"I Don't Wanna Work" (with Stefflon Don)	2023	—	—	—	—	—	—	—	—	—	—		Back to Life
"—" denotes a single that did not chart or was not released in that territory.

=== As featured artist ===
Title	Year	Album
"1234" (Laidback Luke featuring Chuckie and Martin Solveig)	2012	Non-album single
