= Jealousy (Martin Solveig song) =

Single by Martin Solveig

from the album Hedonist
- Released: 8 May 2006 (France)
- Genre: Funky house
- Length: 5:17
- Label: Mixture Stereophonic; Universal Licensing Music; Defected
- Songwriter(s): Martin Solveig
- Producer(s): Martin Solveig

Martin Solveig singles chronology
"Everybody" (2005)	"Jealousy" (2006)	"Rejection" (2007)

"Jealousy" is a song by French DJ and record producer Martin Solveig featuring Lee Fields. The song was released in France as a CD single on 8 May 2006. It was released as the second single from his second studio album Hedonist (2005). The song was written and produced by Martin Solveig. The song peaked at number 36 on the French Singles Chart, and at number 62 on the UK Singles Chart.

== Track listing ==
CD single (Universal)
No.	Title	Length
1.	"Jealousy" (Edit Version)	3:20
2.	"Jealousy" (Album Version)	5:17

Extras
No.	Title	Length
3.	"Jealousy" (Video)	3:47
4.	"Interview Martin Solveig" (Lee Fields)	3:48

== Chart performance ==
Chart (2006)	Peak position
Belgium (Ultratop 50 Flanders)	30
Belgium (Ultratop 50 Wallonia)	40
France (SNEP)	36
Hungary (Dance Top 40)	9
Italy (FIMI)	29
Spain (PROMUSICAE)	8
Switzerland (Schweizer Hitparade)	60
UK Singles (OCC)	62

== Release history ==
Region	Date	Format	Label
France	8 May 2006	CD single	Universal Licensing Music
