= Kévin Aymoz =

French figure skater (born 1997)

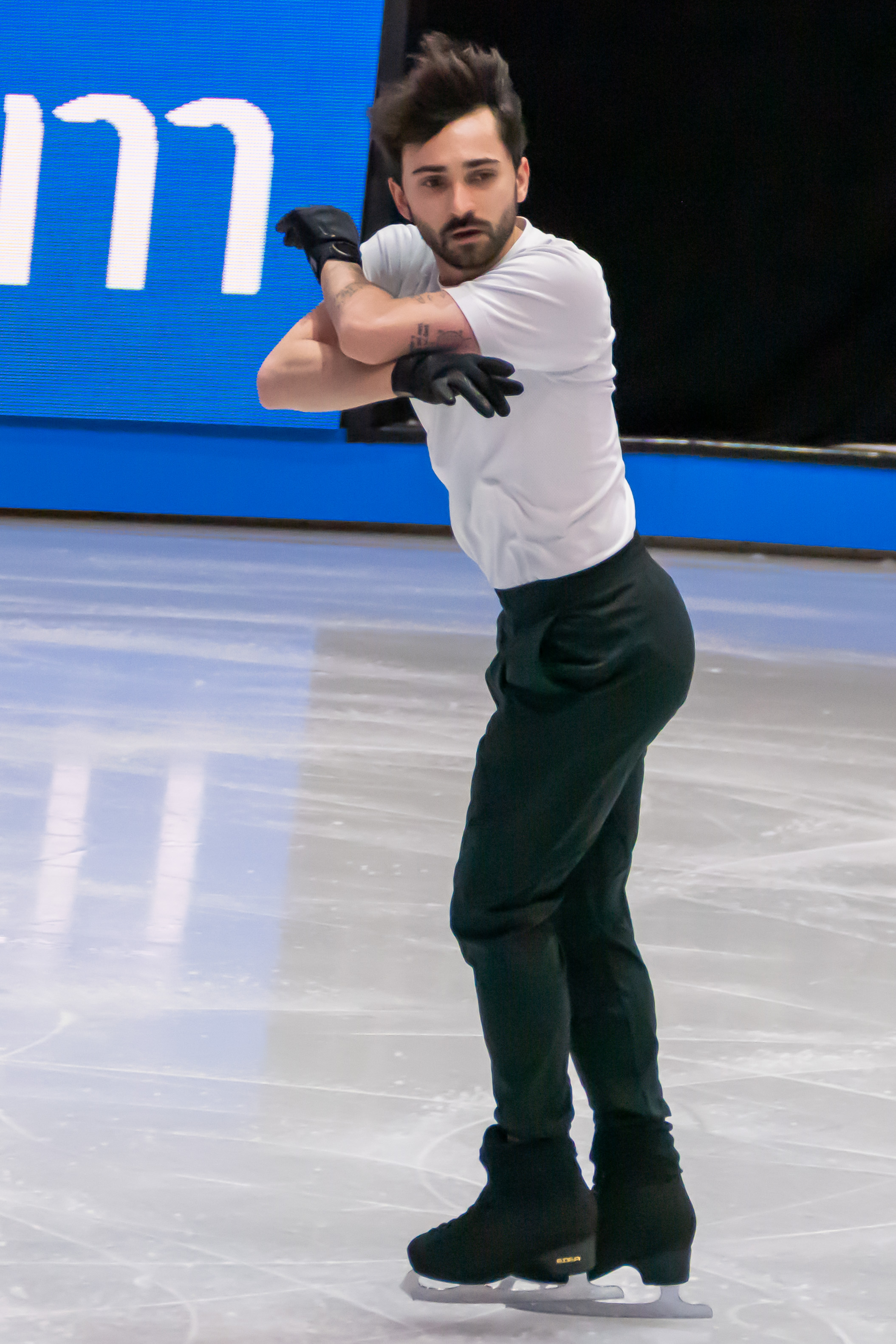
- Aymoz at the 2025 World Championships

Personal information
- Born: 1 August 1997 (age 29) Échirolles, France
- Home town: Jarrie, France
- Height: 1.60 m (5 ft 3 in)

Figure skating career
- Country: France
- Discipline: Men's singles
- Coach: Silvia Fontana; Françoise Bonnard
- Skating club: GIMP Grenoble
- Began skating: 2003
- Highest WS: 12th (2020–21)

Medal record
Grand Prix Final
Bronze medal – third place	2019–20 Turin	Singles
French Championships
Gold medal – first place	2017 Caen	Singles
Gold medal – first place	2019 Vaujany	Singles
Gold medal – first place	2020 Dunkirk	Singles
Gold medal – first place	2021 Vaujany	Singles
Gold medal – first place	2022 Cergy-Pontoise	Singles
Gold medal – first place	2025 Annecy	Singles
Gold medal – first place	2026 Briancon	Singles
Silver medal – second place	2018 Nantes	Singles
Silver medal – second place	2023 Rouen	Singles

Kévin Aymoz (French pronunciation: [ke.vin e.moz]; born 1 August 1997) is a French figure skater. He is the 2019–20 Grand Prix Final bronze medalist, a nine-time ISU Grand Prix medalist, and a six-time ISU Challenger Series medalist. Domestically, he is a seven-time French national champion (2017, 2019–2022, 2025–26).

Aymoz represented France at the 2022 and 2026 Winter Olympics, where he finished twelfth and eleventh respectively. He has placed as high as fourth at the World Championships (2023), and twice finished fourth at the European Championships (2019, 2023).

== Personal life ==
Aymoz was born on 1 August 1997 in Échirolles, in France.

He was one of the six French gay athletes featured in the documentary We Need to Talk.

== Career ==
=== Early years ===
Aymoz began learning to skate in 2003. He became the French national junior bronze medalist in the 2012–2013 season and repeated the following season.

=== 2014–2015 season: Junior national title and senior international debut ===
Aymoz started the 2014–2015 season on the junior level, winning gold at the Lombardia Trophy and bronze at the International Cup of Nice. Making his senior international debut, he finished eighth at the 2014 NRW Trophy at the end of November. He placed fifth on the senior level at the French Championships, held in December, before winning the national junior title in February 2015. Aymoz ended his season with a senior international medal, silver at the Coupe du Printemps in March.

=== 2015–2016 season: Junior Grand Prix debut ===
Early in the season, Aymoz was coached by Véronique Cartau, Bernard Glesser, and Jean-François Ballester in Grenoble. His ISU Junior Grand Prix debut came in late August 2015; he placed fourth at his sole assignment, in Riga, Latvia. After winning the senior bronze medal at the Lombardia Trophy in September, he made his first appearances on the ISU Challenger Series (CS), placing seventh at the 2015 Tallinn Trophy in November and twelfth at the 2015 Golden Spin of Zagreb in December.

In February 2016, Aymoz won his second French national junior title. In March, he represented France at the 2016 World Junior Championships in Debrecen, Hungary; he qualified for the free skate by placing fifth in the short program. He finished ninth overall after placing eleventh in the free skating. By the end of the season, he was training in both Grenoble and Annecy, overseen by Cartau, Didier Lucine, Claudine Lucine, and Sophie Golaz.

=== 2016–2017 season: First national title ===
In the first half of the season, Aymoz was coached by Didier Lucine, Sophie Golaz, and Véronique Cartau in Annecy. In December 2016, he won the French national title. On 16 January 2017, the FFSG reported that Aymoz had decided to return to Grenoble and that the federation had sent Katia Krier for the intermediary period. He placed fifteenth at the 2017 European Championships in Ostrava, Czech Republic.

=== 2017–2018 season ===
During the season, Aymoz trained with Katia Krier in Paris and with John Zimmerman in Tampa, Florida. He took gold at the Denkova-Staviski Cup and finished tenth at his debut Grand Prix event, the 2017 Internationaux de France. His season ended after he finished second to Chafik Besseghier at the French Championships.

=== 2018–2019 season: Second national title ===
At his first event of the season, the 2018 CS Autumn Classic International, Aymoz placed eighth in the short, third in the free, and fifth overall.

Aymoz received two Grand Prix assignments, the 2018 Skate Canada International and 2018 Internationaux de France. He placed seventh and fifth, respectively. At the year's close, Aymoz won his second French national title.

At the 2019 European Championships, Aymoz placed fourth in both the short program and free skate, finishing fourth overall, and only 0.74 points behind bronze medalist Matteo Rizzo of Italy. At the 2019 World Championships in Saitama, Japan, he placed eleventh, setting a new personal best in the short program and total score.

=== 2019–2020 season: Grand Prix Final bronze ===
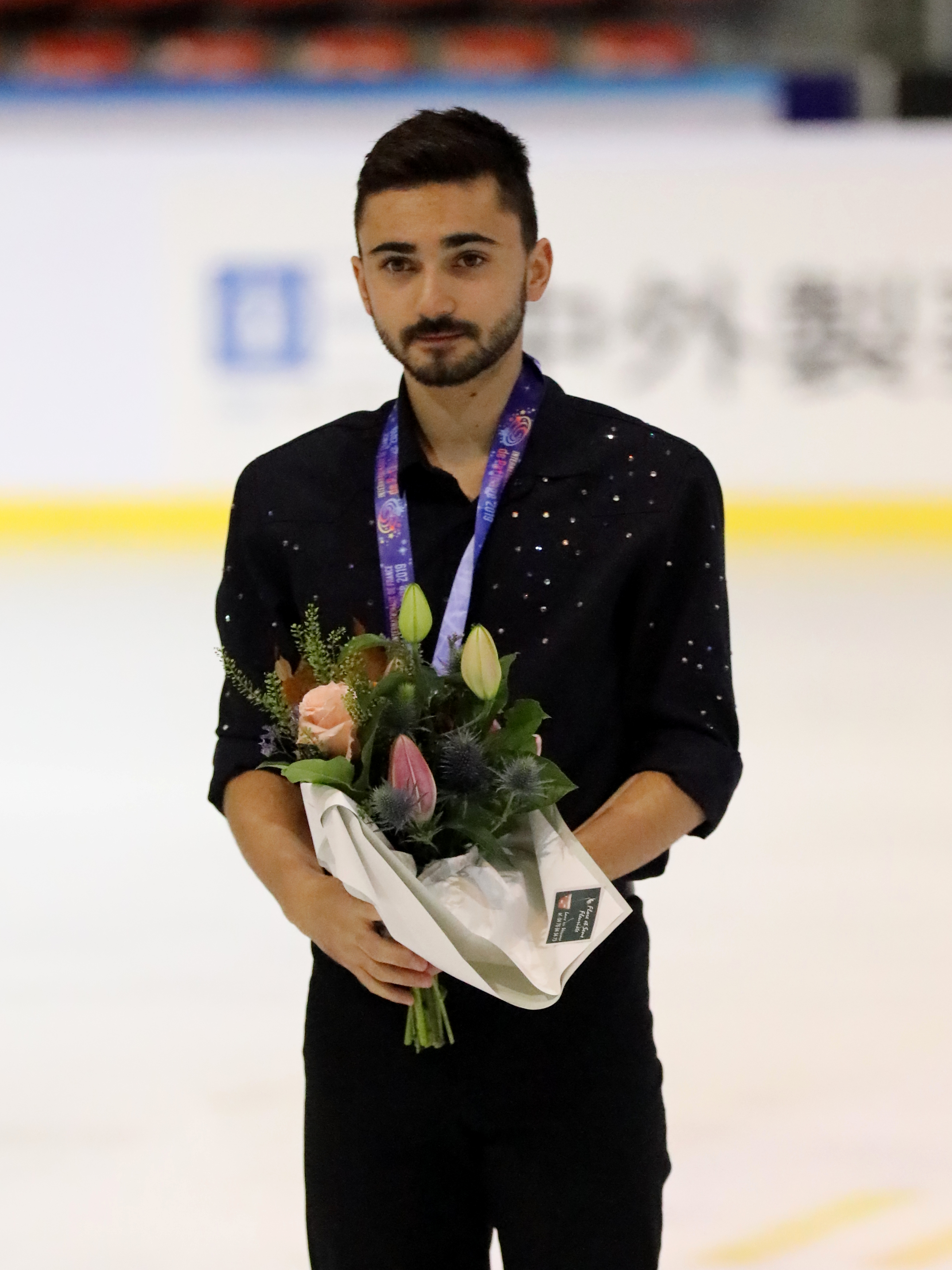
Aymoz at the 2019 Internationaux de France

Aymoz again began his season on the Challenger series at the 2019 Autumn Classic International, where he won the silver medal with second-place finishes in both segments. Aymoz landed two quads in a free skate for the first time.

On the Grand Prix, Aymoz competed first at the 2019 Internationaux de France, where a fall on his combination attempt in the short program left him in third place, distantly behind Nathan Chen and Alexander Samarin but only a few points ahead of Shoma Uno. He placed second in the free skate, behind Chen, winning the bronze medal overall. Aymoz then continued this successful streak by winning silver at the following NHK Trophy and thereby qualifying for the Grand Prix Final. He was second in the short program behind Yuzuru Hanyu, making only a small error on his quad toe loop, and third in the free skate behind Hanyu and Roman Sadovsky. Competing at the Final, Aymoz placed third in the short program, skating cleanly despite a musical mishap that initially played the music of competitor Dmitri Aliev. Third in the free skate as well with only one error with a fall on an underrotated quad toe, he won the bronze medal, the first Frenchman to medal at the Final since Brian Joubert in 2006.

After winning the French national title again, Aymoz headed into the 2020 European Championships as one of the favourites to take the title. However, in what commentators dubbed "a day to forget" for the skater, all three of his jumping passes failed in the short program. He placed twenty-sixth in that segment, failing to qualify for the free skate, to the "shock" of much of the audience. This proved to be Aymoz's final competition for the season, as the World Championships in Montreal were cancelled as a result of the coronavirus pandemic.

=== 2020–2021 season ===
With the pandemic continuing to affect international travel, the ISU opted to assign the Grand Prix based mainly on geographic location, with Aymoz being assigned to the 2020 Internationaux de France. However, this event was subsequently cancelled. In February, Aymoz won his fourth national title. On 1 March, he was named to the team for the 2021 World Championships.

Competing in Stockholm, Aymoz placed ninth in the short program. Ninth in the free skate as well; he held ninth place overall. Aymoz's result qualified one men's berth for France at the 2022 Winter Olympics, and the possibility of a second to be earned later. He was subsequently announced as part of the French team for the 2021 World Team Trophy. On 8 April, he was named as team captain. Aymoz placed fourth in both the short program and the free skate, while Team France finished in fifth place.

=== 2021–2022 season: Beijing Olympics ===
Aymoz recruited hip hop choreographer Mehdi Kerkouche to work on his programs for the new season, seeing someone from outside the skating world bring an "unexpected" perspective. Due to a case of athletic pubalgia, he was unable to practice on ice for two months, resuming training three weeks before Master's de Patinage, where he attempted less than his normal technical difficulty and won the bronze medal. He subsequently attempted to compete at the 2021 Skate America but withdrew after falling on all three jumping passes in the short program, citing his injury. He was ninth at the 2021 Internationaux de France, skating with reduced technical content.

After winning the French national title, Aymoz was named to the French Olympic team. Competing at the 2022 European Championships, he was tenth in the short program but rose to fourth in the free skate, finishing seventh overall.

Competing at the 2022 Winter Olympics, Aymoz placed tenth in the short program of the men's event, despite tripling a planned quad Salchow jump. Jump errors in the free skate saw him rank fifteenth in that segment, but he finished twelfth overall. He was eleventh at the 2022 World Championships to conclude the season.

=== 2022–2023 season: Top 5 at World Championships ===
After a difficult Olympic season, Aymoz contemplated whether he had the desire to continue for another four years to the 2026 Winter Olympics. He said he "took a summer break–reading books and watching TV shows. And then I was like: Okay, I'm ready to go again." For his free program for the season, he drew inspiration from Madeline Miller's novel The Song of Achilles, about the relationship between Achilles and Patroclus. Using primarily music from Gladiator, he explained, "my story is not about gladiators, but the music touches my heart, and it's the story of two people fighting for love."

Aymoz began the new season in September at the 2022 U.S. Classic. After winning the short program, placing ahead of American rising star Ilia Malinin, he finished second in the free skate and overall. He then traveled to France to compete at the Master's de Patinage but sustained an ankle injury while there and had to withdraw from the 2022 Grand Prix de France. After six weeks of recovery, he came back to win his first Challenger gold medal at the 2022 Warsaw Cup. The following week at 2022 Grand Prix of Espoo, he again won the short program over Malinin, despite not yet attempting any quad jumps post-injury. He was third in the free skate and won the bronze medal overall, a result of which he said he was "really proud."

At the French championships, Aymoz finished second behind Adam Siao Him Fa. He then competed at the 2023 European Championships, coming fourth in the short program after singling his triple Axel attempt. He was fourth in the free skate as well, and finished fourth overall, 7.09 points behind Swiss bronze medalist Lukas Britschgi.

Aymoz finished fifth in the short program at the 2023 World Championships in Saitama, saying that he had entered the competition without any "special goals" as to his placement, adding "I just want to be here and enjoy myself." He went on to finish fourth in the free skate, setting a new personal best score in the segment, and finishing fourth overall. He was less than sixth points behind American bronze medalist Ilia Malinin. This was the best world results for a Frenchman in eleven years, since Brian Joubert's 4th place in 2012. Subsequently, Aymoz was named for the second time in a row captain of the French team at the 2023 World Team Trophy. He set a new personal best score of 100.58 in the short program, finishing third in the segment and clearing the 100-point threshold for the first time in his career, which he celebrated. He came fourth in the free skate adding back two quads for the first time of the season, while Team France finished fifth overall at the event.

=== 2023–2024 season: Struggles and inconsistency ===
Aymoz began the season at the 2023 Autumn Classic International, winning the silver medal. He was invited to participate in the Japan Open as part of Team Europe. He came fourth of six in the men's event, while the team won the bronze medal. On the Grand Prix, Aymoz won the silver medal at the 2023 Skate America. In an interview soon after, he talked about "experience of dealing with nerves before his performances and how he effectively managed the stress." He went on to take the bronze at the 2023 Grand Prix of Espoo, recovering from short program errors that had seen him place fifth in that segment. He revealed afterward that he was working toward reintroducing the quad Salchow into competition, wanting to return to performing two quad types.

Qualifying to the 2023–24 Grand Prix Final, Aymoz finished fifth in the short program, his lone mistake being a foot down on the landing of his triple Axel. He had a poor free skate, falling three times, and dropping to sixth place. He then returned to France for the national championships in Vaujany, where he came second in the short program, but a "catastrophe" in the free skate saw him tenth in that segment, and drop to seventh place overall.

Despite his lower national championship ranking, Aymoz was sent to the 2024 European Championships in Kaunas. His struggles continued, and he placed thirty-first in the short program, failing to qualify for the free skate. Afterward, he announced his withdrawal from the 2024 World Championships and all other competitions for the rest of the season, citing a need to work on his mental health and prepare for the next two seasons.

=== 2024–2025 season ===
Aymoz struggled with depression during his time off; he was given support from those close to him and worked with a mental coach and therapists. He began his season at the Master's de Patinage, though he had resumed training his programs less than two weeks beforehand and had not yet skated an entire run-through that season. Aymoz performed poorly in the free skate, falling four times and finishing in seventh place. He later said, "I knew I could manage the short program, but you can't fake it in a free skate. You're either ready, or you're not. Sometimes, the magic of sport and adrenaline help, but I wasn't ready."

A few weeks later, Aymoz competed at the first of his two Grand Prix assignments, Skate America. He struggled in practices and later said he was not sure if he was ready to compete, but he placed fourth in the short program and earned the best component scores of the field. In the free skate, he earned a personal best score and won that segment of the competition, and he won the silver medal behind Ilia Malinin. "Since the last year I changed a lot in my training and in myself," the Frenchman said after the free skate. "I used to train three hours a day on the ice, now I do two times 40 min on the ice plus a lot of off-ice.

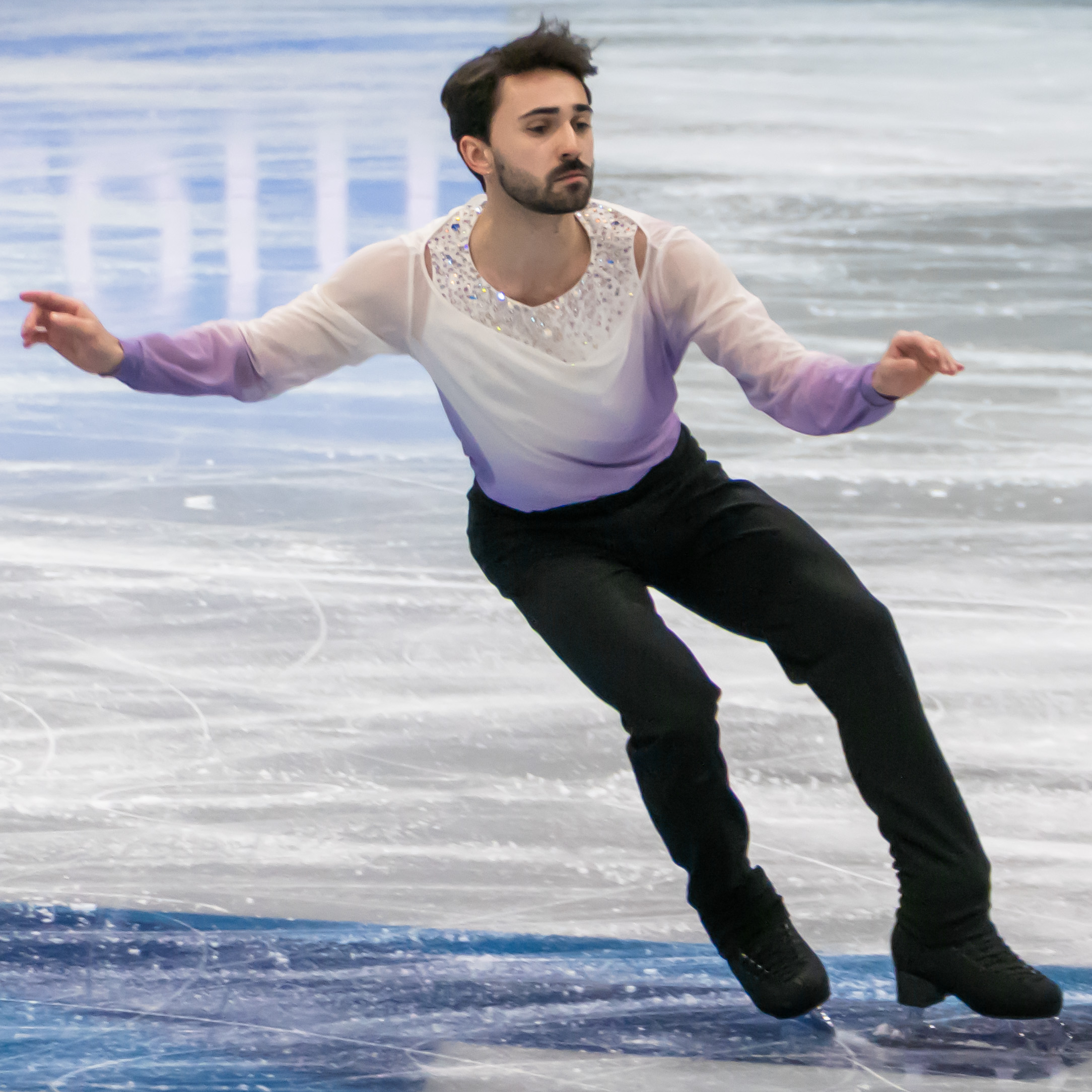
Aymoz during the short program at the 2025 World Championships

Aymoz took several days off to rest before his next competition, the 2024 Finlandia Trophy. He was third in the short program; afterward, he said that he was attempting to not succumb to the stress of trying to qualify for the Grand Prix Final, which would be held in his home rink in Grenoble. In the free skate, he fell on his opening quad toe loop attempt and had a poor exit on his second attempt at the jump. However, he performed more cleanly in the second half of the program and finished second overall behind Yuma Kagiyama. He said of his free skate, "I had to prove to myself I could get up and when I fell on the quad toe, I was almost felt like, 'Yes, now I have another chance to prove to everyone that I can get up'." Aymoz also relayed that this was one of the "most stressful" events of his career. However, his placements at his Grand Prix events qualified him for the Grand Prix Final.

At the Grand Prix Final, he placed sixth after having two falls in his short program and several errors on his jumps in his free skate, though he received good grades of execution on his spins and step sequences. Aymoz said that he felt "really lucky" to compete in the Final in his home rink and that he was happy despite his placement.

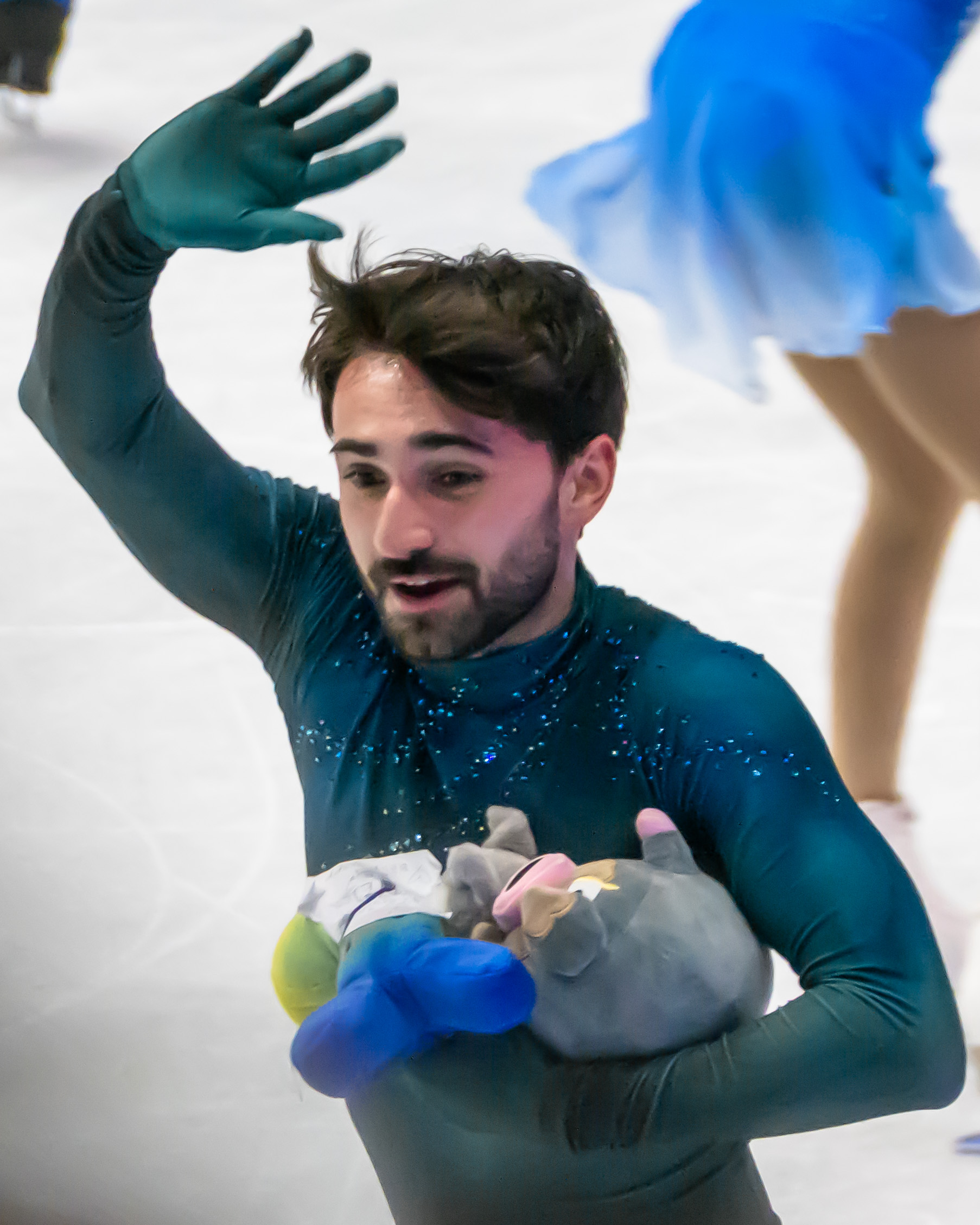
Aymoz waving to the crowd after his free skate at the 2025 World Championships

Aymoz competed in the 2025 European Championships, held in Tallinn beginning in late January. He placed twenty-second after problems in both programs and apologized for not being able to perform better for the audience. After the European Championships, he changed his short program to the one he had used in the previous season, saying that his newer short program no longer felt appropriate after the crash Flight 5342; he dedicated it both to the victims of the crash as well as to transgender people, saying the "original story" of the program was about them and that "I want to use my voice and tell this story in the United States, where it matters a lot right now."

In February, Aymoz won the Road to 26 Trophy, a test event for the 2026 Winter Olympics. In late March, he competed at the 2025 World Championships, held in Boston. He finished fourth in the short program. In the free skate, he had several errors in his jumps but received the third-highest component scores of that competition segment, and he finished in fifth place just behind compatriot Adam Siao Him Fa. He expressed joy about the supportive crowd and his improved mental health: "I remember last year, at the World Championships, I wasn't there. I was alone in the dark, crying. But now, I'm here." Siao Him Fa and Aymoz's placements earned France three berths for French men's singles skating at the 2026 Winter Olympics.

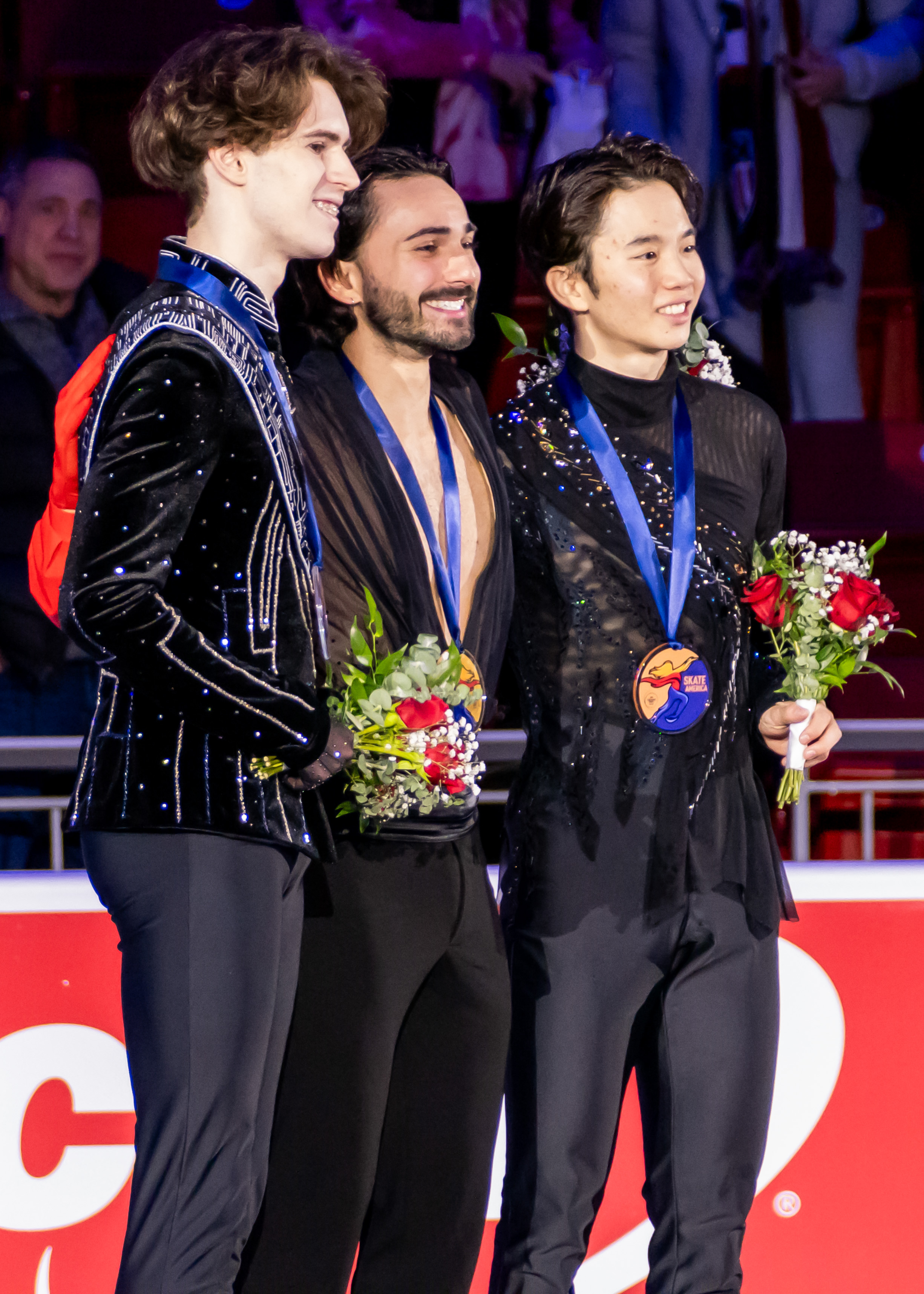
Aymoz on the 2025 Skate America podium with silver medalist Mikhail Shaidorov (left) and bronze medalist Kazuki Tomono (right)

Aymoz closed the season by competing for Team France at the 2025 World Team Trophy, placing seventh in the individual event with Team France finishing fourth overall.

"I think it was my best season ever, two medals in Grand Prix, two silver," said Aymoz. "I went for my third Final, national champion again, and I qualified for the free skate at Europeans. What more can I ask...and fifth at Worlds. Here, we are doing a beautiful competition. I'm proud of my team, they motivated me for the two skates."

=== 2025–26 season: Milano Cortina Olympics, Grand Prix gold ===
Aymoz began the season in August at the 2025 Master's de Patinage, winning his fourth gold medal at this event. The following month, he took gold at 2025 CS Nepela Memorial, for a total of five Challenger Series medals to date.

In October, Aymoz competed at 2025 Skate Canada International. He placed fifth in the short program, eleventh in the free skate, and tenth overall.

The following month, he competed at 2025 Skate America, where he captured his first Grand Prix gold medal. Aymoz said that the two weeks after Skate Canada had been "really mentally challenging" and expressed joy over his medal: "Finally, a gold medal, especially at Skate America for me, so I feel like I'm one of the biggest medalists!"

In December, he competed at the 2026 French Championships, where he won his seventh national title. Following the event, he was named to the 2026 Winter Olympic team.

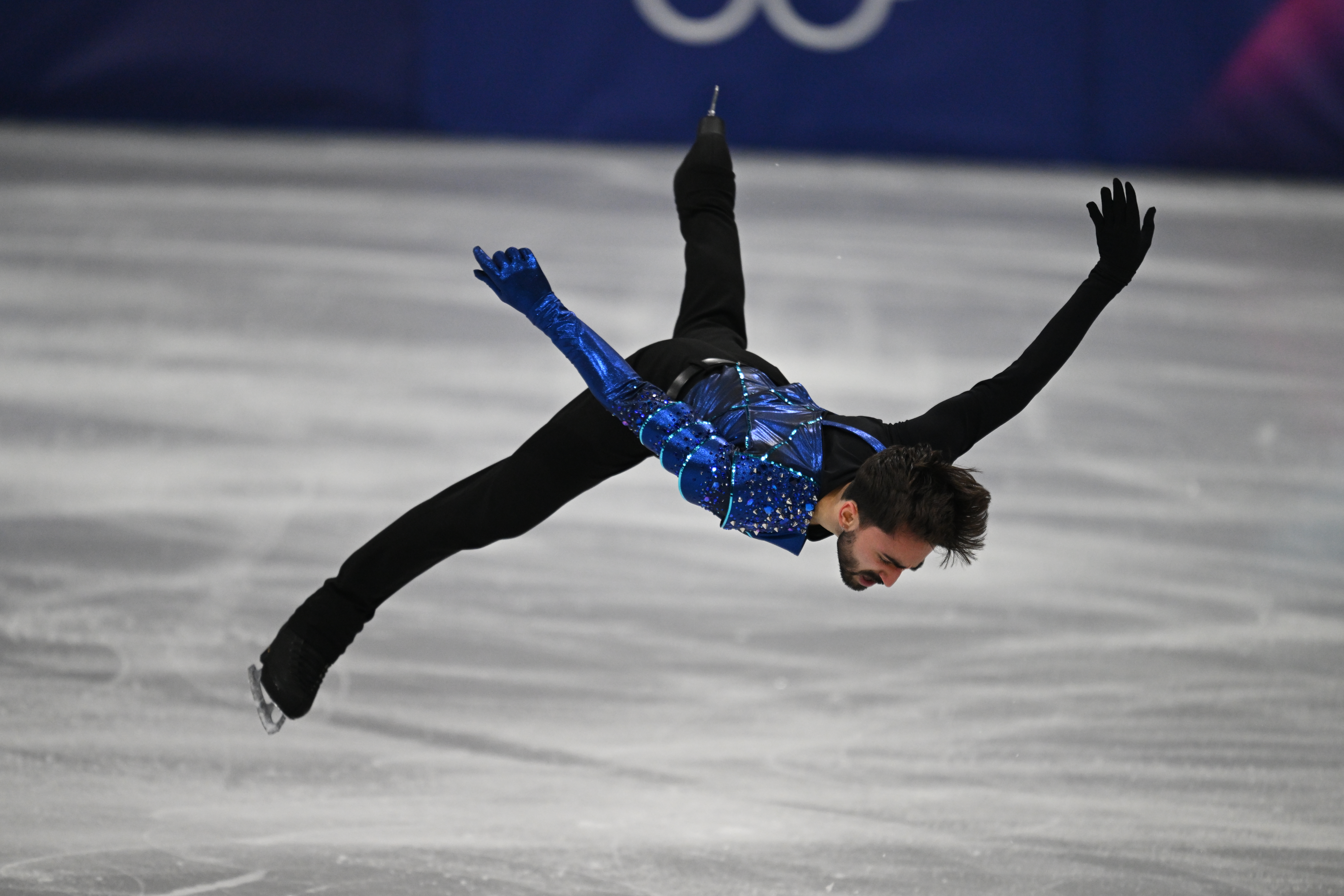
Aymoz performing a butterfly jump at the 2026 Winter Olympics

The following month, he competed at the 2026 European Championships, finishing twenty-seventh in the short program. As a result, he did not qualify for the free skate. He said of his performance, "I'm very disappointed with my skate. Of course, I will try to regroup myself and will focus on the positive, and there were positives today. Even if it didn't look like that."

On 7 February, Aymoz placed fourth in the short program in the 2026 Winter Olympics Figure Skating Team Event. "It was a challenge today because my last competition was the European Championships, and it was a disaster," he said. "So, it was difficult to come here to the Olympics and do something good."

In March, Aymoz placed seventh at the 2026 World Figure Skating Championships. He had a dismal 11th-place short program, but he rebounded in the free skate, where he placed fifth with a new season's best score. "I was really happy after finishing my performance; it was really, really nice," he said after the free skate. "I woke up this morning feeling relieved to be on the last day and to watch everyone else. It felt a little like the last day of school when you're really young—a day where you just play with friends. Today, I went out to play on the ice, and it was really nice."

=== 2026–27 season ===
Aymoz began the new season by competing in the 2026 Budapest Trophy, where he placed fifth. He subsequently placed first at 2026 Skate Canada International with a total score of 258.43, beating two-time Junior World Champion Rio Nakata by a little under 10 points. “Today I wasn't expecting to win,” he admitted. “When I came to the competition, I wasn't expecting any result. Like I said, I'm lucky to be here. But it's my second win at a different Grand Prix, and I'm truly happy.”

== Awards ==
Kévin Aymoz has been nominated two times to the new ISU Skating Award.

Titre
	Award Category	Programs	Results
ISU Awards 2020	Most Entertaining Program	Prince Short Program	Top 3 Finalist
ISU Award 2022	Most Entertaining Program	Euphoria Short Program	Nominee

== Programs ==
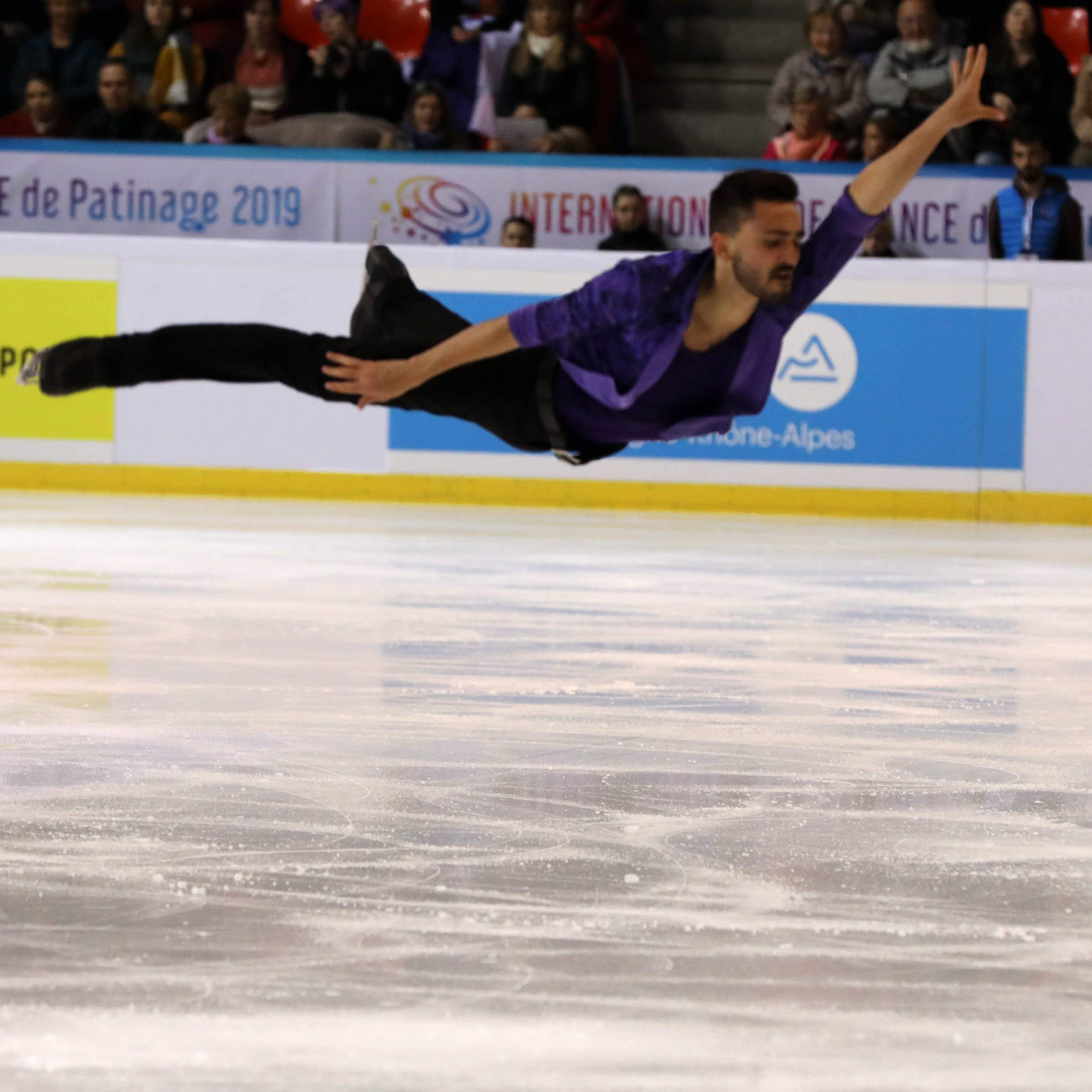
Aymoz performing his short program at the 2019 Internationaux de France

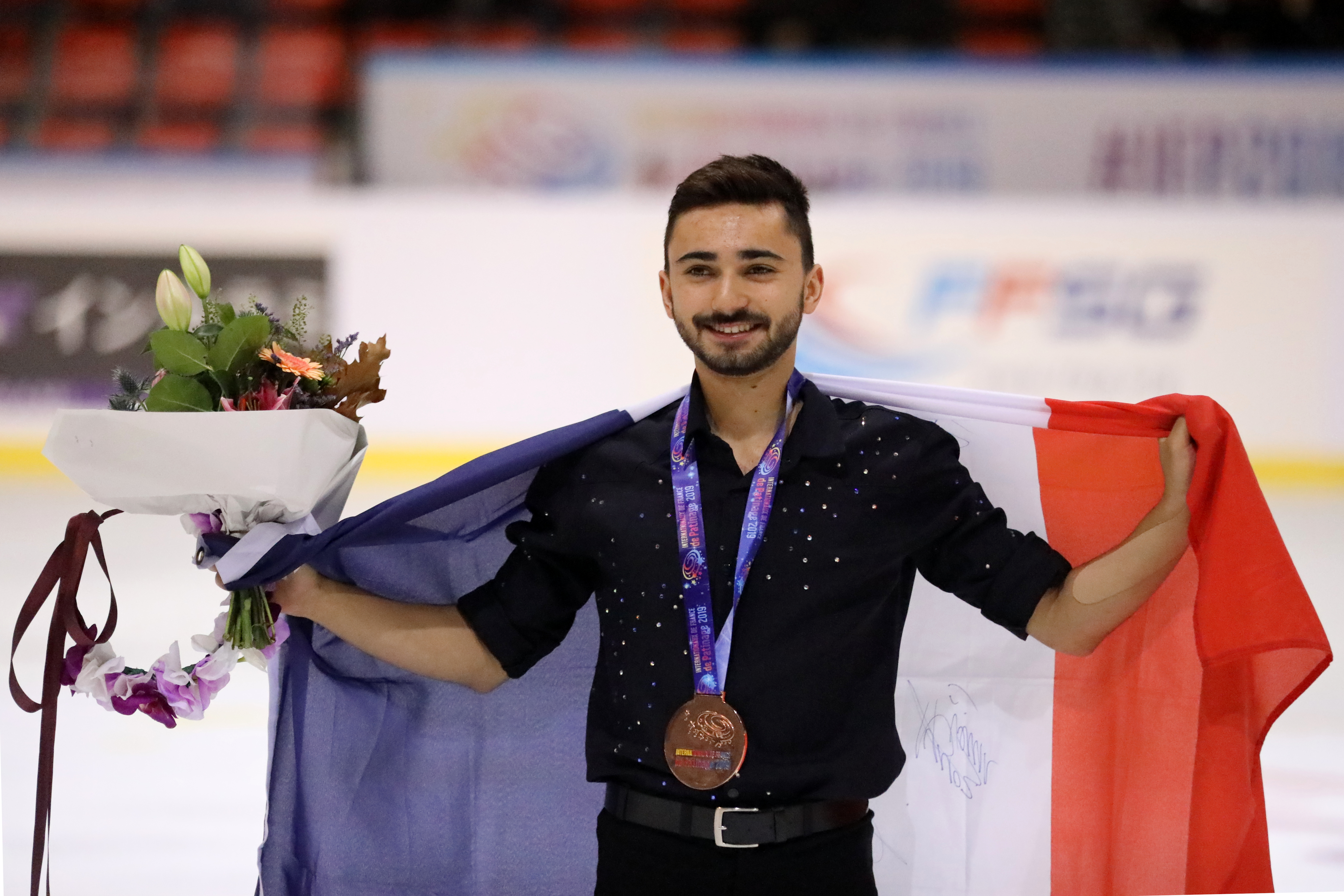
Aymoz at the 2019 Internationaux de France

Season	Short program	Free skating	Exhibition
2026–2027	"Pirates of the Caribbean": Up Is Down; Jack Sparrow; He's a Pirate composed by Hans Zimmer choreo. by Kevin Aymoz	Spiegel im Spiegel by Arvo Pärt, Dubeau , Angèle & la Pieta; Miroir by Karl Hugo choreo. by Kevin Aymoz	
2025–2026	Le lac (from Matthias & Maxime) by Jean-Michel Blais choreo. by Kevin Aymoz; Le lac (from Matthias & Maxime) by Jean-Michel Blais; Judas by Lady Gaga choreo. by Kevin Aymoz	Boléro by Maurice Ravel performed by Budapest Scoring Symphonic Orchestra & Peter Pejtsik choreo. by Brice Mousset, Kevin Aymoz	When the Party's Over by Billie Eilish performed by James Blake
2024–2025	Bird Gerhl by Anohni arranged by Karl Hugo choreo. by Brice Mousset, Kevin Aymoz; Everybody by Martin Solveig choreo. by Kevin Aymoz, Silvia Fontana, John Zimmerman	Van Gogh by Virginio Aiello; Hold on Tight (Single Edit) by Thomas Azier; Destiny by Karl Hugo choreo. by Kevin Aymoz, Silvia Fontana, John Zimmerman	Everybody by Martin Solveig choreo. by Kevin Aymoz, Silvia Fontana, John Zimmerman; I'm Outta Love by Anastacia; Hallelujah by Leonard Cohen performed by Jeff Buckley
2023–2024	Bird Gerhl by Anohni arranged by Karl Hugo choreo. by Brice Mousset, Kevin Aymoz	Boléro by Maurice Ravel performed by Budapest Scoring Symphonic Orchestra & Peter Pejtsik choreo. by Brice Mousset, Kevin Aymoz	Sign of the Times by Harry Styles
2022–2023	Euphoria; Still Don't Know My Name; Nate Growing Up by Labrinth choreo. by Brice Mousset, Kevin Aymoz, Silvia Fontana	Original Composition by Maxime Rodriguez; Now We Are Free (from Gladiator) by Lisa Gerrard; Honor Him (from Gladiator) by Hans Zimmer; Epic Deliverance by Karl Hugo choreo. by Brice Mousset, Kevin Aymoz, Silvia Fontana	Les yeux de la mama by Kendji Girac; Singin' in the Rain by Gene Kelly; It's Raining Men by The Weather Girls performed by Geri Halliwell; Flares by The Script
2021–2022	The Question of U by Prince choreo. by Silvia Fontana, John Zimmermann, Renée Roca	Outro by M83 choreo. by Silvia Fontana	
2020–2021	Indigene by Maxime Rodriguez; Gorilla et Kabila by Lord Kra Ven choreo. by Silvia Fontana	Lighthouse by Patrick Watson choreo. by Silvia Fontana, John Zimmermann, Renée Roca	
2019–2020	The Question of U by Prince choreo. by Silvia Fontana, John Zimmermann, Renée Roca	Lighthouse by Patrick Watson choreo. by Silvia Fontana, John Zimmermann, Renée Roca	
2018–2019	Horns by Lick Twist, Bryce Fox choreo. by John Zimmermann, Silvia Fontana	In This Shirt by The Irrepressibles choreo. by John Zimmermann, Silvia Fontana, Kevin Aymoz	I Found by Amber Run
2017–2018	Wicked Game performed by James Vincent McMorrow arranged by Maxime Rodriguez	O by Coldplay; Conquest of Spaces; Run Boy Run by Woodkid arranged by Maxime Rodriguez	
2016–2017	Radioactive by Imagine Dragons; Hallelujah by Leonard Cohen	Condolence; Nemesis by Benjamin Clementine	Le Portrait by Calogero
2015–2016	Hallelujah by Leonard Cohen	Torn - Resolve by Nathan Lanier	Le Portrait by Calogero

== Competitive highlights ==
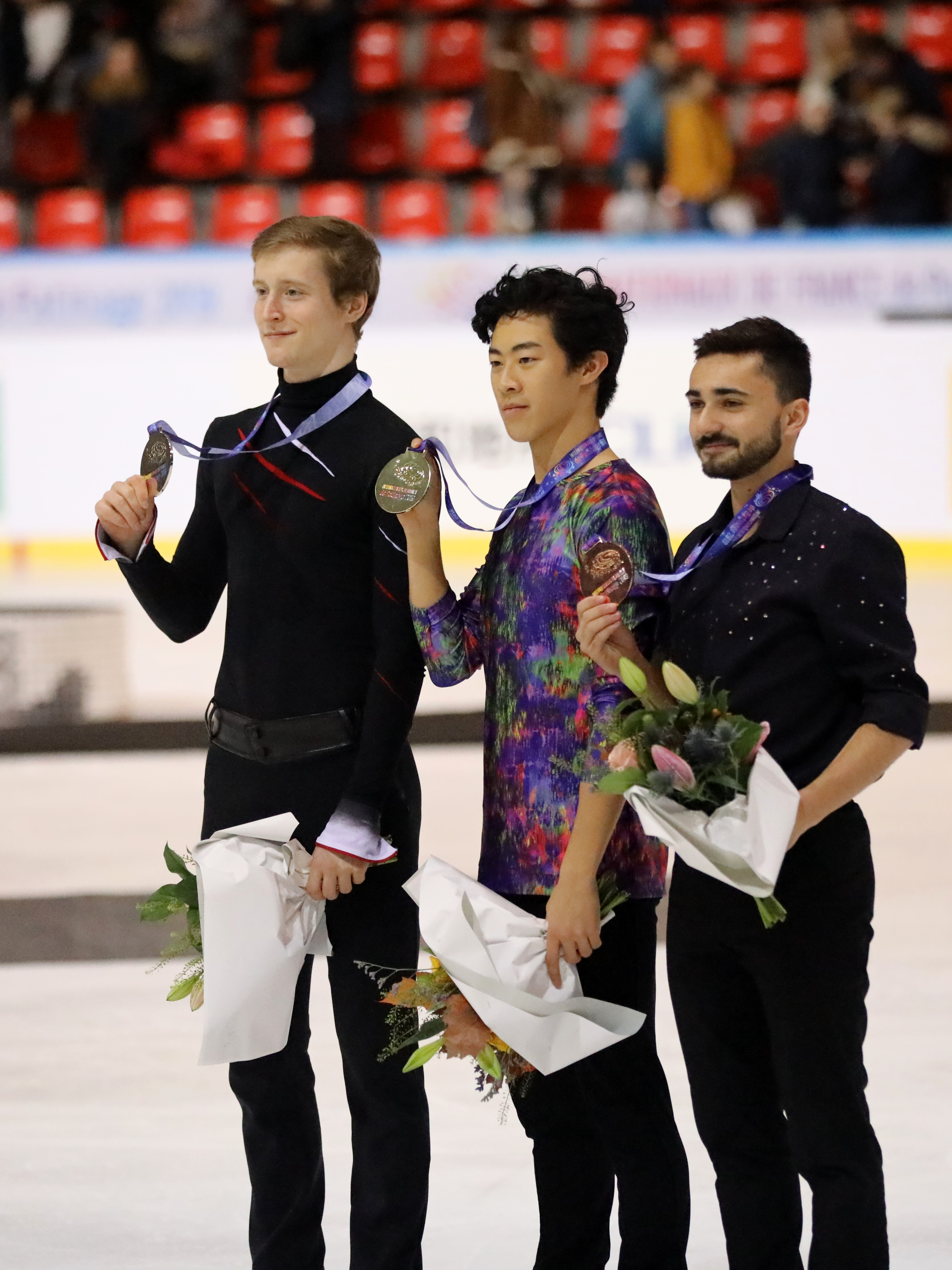
Aymoz (right) with Nathan Chen (center) and Alexander Samarin (left) at the 2019 Internationaux de France

- GP – Event of the ISU Grand Prix Series
- JGP – Event of the ISU Junior Grand Prix Series
- CS – Event of the ISU Challenger Series
- C – Event was cancelled
- TBD – Assigned
- WD – Withdrew from competition
- Medals at team events are awarded for the team results only. Individual placements at team events are listed in parentheses.

Competition placements at senior level
Season	2014–15	2015–16	2016–17	2017–18	2018–19	2019–20	2020–21	2021–22	2022–23	2023–24	2024–25	2025–26	2026-27
Winter Olympics								12th				11th	
Winter Olympics (Team event)												6th	
World Championships					11th	C	9th	11th	4th		5th	7th	
European Championships			15th		4th	26th		7th	4th	31st	22nd	27th	
Grand Prix Final						3rd				6th	6th		
French Championships	5th		1st	2nd	1st	1st	1st	1st	2nd	7th	1st	1st	
World Team Trophy			6th (11th)		4th (9th)		5th (4th)		5th (3rd)		4th (7th)		
GP Finland									3rd	3rd	2nd		
GP France				10th	5th	3rd		9th					
GP NHK Trophy						2nd							TBD
GP Skate America								WD		2nd	2nd	1st	
GP Skate Canada					7th							10th	1st
CS Autumn Classic					5th	2nd				2nd			
CS Golden Spin of Zagreb		12th						7th				1st	
CS Nepela Memorial												1st	
CS Tallinn Trophy		7th											
CS U.S. Classic									2nd				
CS Warsaw Cup			10th						1st				
CS Budapest Trophy													5th
Denkova-Staviski Cup				1st									
Golden Bear of Zagreb			1st										
Japan Open										3rd (4th)			
Lombardia Trophy		3rd											
Master's de Patinage			5th		1st	1st	1st	3rd	WD	2nd	7th	1st	
NRW Trophy	8th												
Road to 26 Trophy											1st		
Winter Star							1st						
Coupe du Printemps	2nd												

Competition placements at junior level
Season	2012–13	2013–14	2014–15	2015–16	2016–17
World Junior Championships				9th	7th
French Championships (Senior)	6th	5th			
French Championships (Junior)	3rd	3rd	1st	1st	
JGP France					4th
JGP Latvia				4th	
JGP Slovenia					6th
Cup of Nice			3rd		
Gardena Spring Trophy	4th	3rd			
Lombardia Trophy		1st	1st		
Master's de Patinage	4th	WD	2nd	1st	

== Detailed results ==
ISU personal best scores in the +5/-5 GOE System
Segment	Type	Score	Event
Total	TSS	282.97	2023 World Championships
Short program	TSS	100.58	2023 World Team Trophy
Short program	TES	54.17	2023 World Team Trophy
Short program	PCS	46.41	2023 World Team Trophy
Free skating	TSS	190.84	2024 Skate America
Free skating	TES	98.90	2024 Skate America
Free skating	PCS	93.24	2023 Skate America

ISU personal best scores in the +3/-3 GOE System
Segment	Type	Score	Event
Total	TSS	220.43	2017 Internationaux de France
Short program	TSS	77.24	2017 World Junior Championships
Short program	TES	42.63	2017 World Junior Championships
Short program	PCS	35.82	2017 Internationaux de France
Free skating	TSS	150.43	2017 Internationaux de France
Free skating	TES	73.21	2017 Internationaux de France
Free skating	PCS	77.22	2017 Internationaux de France

- Medals at team events are awarded for the team results only. Individual placements at team events are listed in parentheses.

=== Senior level ===
Results in the 2012–13 season
Date	Event	SP		FS		Total	
Date	Event	P	Score	P	Score	P	Score
12–15 Dec 2013	(France) 2013 French Championships	7	49.89	6	111.40	6	161.29

Results in the 2013–14 season
Date	Event	SP		FS		Total	
Date	Event	P	Score	P	Score	P	Score
12–15 Dec 2013	(France) 2014 French Championships	5	55.61	6	99.90	5	155.51

Results in the 2014–15 season
Date	Event	SP		FS		Total	
Date	Event	P	Score	P	Score	P	Score
26–30 Nov 2014	(Germany) 2014 NRW Trophy	9	55.50	9	103.18	8	158.68
18–21 Dec 2014	(France) 2015 French Championships	4	65.95	5	122.70	5	188.65
13–15 Mar 2015	(Luxembourg) 2015 Coupe du Printemps	7	56.28	2	120.34	2	176.62

Results in the 2015–16 season
Date	Event	SP		FS		Total	
Date	Event	P	Score	P	Score	P	Score
17–20 Sep 2015	(Italy) 2015 Lombardia Trophy	2	65.79	3	131.44	3	197.23
18–22 Nov 2015	(Estonia) 2015 CS Tallinn Trophy	6	67.18	9	111.88	7	179.06
2–5 Dec 2015	(Croatia) 2015 CS Golden Spin of Zagreb	10	61.77	14	114.89	12	176.66

Results in the 2016–17 season
Date	Event	SP		FS		Total	
Date	Event	P	Score	P	Score	P	Score
6–8 Oct 2016	(France) 2016 Master's de Patinage	3	70.75	5	97.64	5	168.39
27–30 Oct 2016	(Croatia) 2016 Golden Bear of Zagreb	1	75.79	1	127.16	1	202.95
17–20 Nov 2016	(Poland) 2016 CS Warsaw Cup	10	60.61	11	115.93	10	176.54
15–17 Dec 2016	(France) 2017 French Championships	1	78.90	1	155.76	1	234.66
25–29 Jan 2017	(Czech Republic) 2017 European Championships	13	71.26	18	128.21	15	199.47
20–23 Apr 2017	(Japan) 2017 World Team Trophy	9	67.23	11	127.43	6 (11)	194.66

Results in the 2017–18 season
Date	Event	SP		FS		Total	
Date	Event	P	Score	P	Score	P	Score
31 Oct – 4 Nov 2017	(Bulgaria) 2017 Denkova-Staviski Cup	1	75.25	1	150.04	1	225.29
17–19 Nov 2017	2017 Internationaux de France	9	70.00	9	150.43	10	220.43
14–16 Dec 2017	(France) 2018 French Championships	5	67.57	2	148.93	2	216.50

Results in the 2018–19 season
Date	Event	SP		FS		Total	
Date	Event	P	Score	P	Score	P	Score
20–22 Sep 2018	(Canada) 2018 CS Autumn Classic International	8	64.19	3	162.93	5	227.12
25–27 Sep 2018	(France) 2018 Master's de Patinage	1	75.66	2	139.19	1	214.85
26–28 Oct 2018	2018 Skate Canada International	10	78.83	7	151.26	6	230.09
23–25 Nov 2018	2018 Internationaux de France	6	81.00	5	150.16	5	231.16
13–15 Dec 2018	(France) 2019 French Championships	1	95.40	1	167.25	1	262.25
21–27 Jan 2019	(Belarus) 2019 European Championships	4	88.02	4	158.32	4	246.34
18–24 Mar 2019	(Japan) 2019 World Championships	7	88.24	12	159.23	11	247.47
11–14 Apr 2019	(Japan) 2019 World Team Trophy	8	85.22	10	153.83	4 (9)	239.05

Results in the 2019–20 season
Date	Event	SP		FS		Total	
Date	Event	P	Score	P	Score	P	Score
26–28 Sep 2019	(France) 2019 Master's de Patinage	1	99.68	1	179.82	1	279.50
12–14 Sep 2019	(Canada) 2019 Autumn Classic International	2	94.76	2	167.71	2	262.47
1–3 Nov 2019	2019 Internationaux de France	3	82.50	2	172.14	3	254.64
22–24 Nov 2019	(Japan) 2019 NHK Trophy	2	91.47	3	158.55	2	250.02
5–8 Dec 2019	(Italy) 2019–20 Grand Prix Final	3	96.71	3	178.92	3	275.63
19–21 Dec 2019	(France) 2020 French Championships	1	97.73	1	188.72	1	286.45
20–26 Jan 2020	(Austria) 2020 European Championships	26	64.40	—N/a	—N/a	26	64.40

Results in the 2020–21 season
Date	Event	SP		FS		Total	
Date	Event	P	Score	P	Score	P	Score
1–3 Oct 2020	(France) 2020 Master's de Patinage	1	90.19	1	162.36	1	252.55
11–13 Dec 2020	(Belarus) 2020 Winter Star	1	76.92	2	180.52	1	257.44
5–6 Feb 2021	(France) 2021 French Championships	1	96.01	1	188.49	1	284.50
22–28 Mar 2021	(Sweden) 2021 World Championships	9	88.24	9	166.28	9	254.52
15–18 Apr 2021	(Japan) 2021 World Team Trophy	4	94.69	4	169.13	5 (4)	263.82

Results in the 2021–22 season
Date	Event	SP		FS		Total	
Date	Event	P	Score	P	Score	P	Score
30 Sep – 2 Oct 2021	(France) 2021 Master's de Patinage	1	89.90	5	132.96	3	222.86
19–21 Nov 2021	2021 Internationaux de France	12	63.98	8	164.10	9	228.08
9–11 Dec 2021	(Croatia) 2021 CS Golden Spin of Zagreb	14	70.35	6	159.07	7	229.41
16–18 Dec 2021	(France) 2022 French Championships	2	86.57	1	191.07	1	277.64
10–16 Jan 2022	(Estonia) 2022 European Championships	10	80.39	4	171.82	7	252.21
8–10 Feb 2022	(China) 2022 Winter Olympics	10	93.00	15	161.80	12	254.80
21–27 Mar 2022	(France) 2022 World Championships	15	85.26	12	160.20	11	245.46

Results in the 2022–23 season
Date	Event	SP		FS		Total	
Date	Event	P	Score	P	Score	P	Score
13–16 Sep 2022	(United States) 2022 CS U.S. International Classic	1	83.52	2	152.65	2	236.17
17–20 Nov 2022	(Poland) 2022 CS Warsaw Cup	1	89.60	2	168.42	1	258.02
25–27 Nov 2022	(Finland) 2022 Grand Prix Espoo	1	88.96	3	166.73	3	255.69
15–17 Dec 2022	(France) 2023 French Championships	2	82.91	2	173.70	2	256.61
25–29 Jan 2023	(Finland) 2023 European Championships	4	83.75	4	157.17	4	240.92
22–26 Mar 2023	(Japan) 2023 World Championships	5	95.56	4	187.41	4	282.97
13–16 Apr 2023	(Japan) 2023 World Team Trophy	3	100.58	4	178.85	5 (3)	279.43

Results in the 2023–24 season
Date	Event	SP		FS		Total	
Date	Event	P	Score	P	Score	P	Score
14–17 Sep 2023	(Canada) 2023 CS Autumn Classic International	6	72.58	2	164.77	2	237.35
28–30 Sep 2023	(France) 2023 Master's de Patinage	2	97.91	2	164.09	2	262.00
7 Oct 2023	2023 Japan Open	—N/a	—N/a	4	155.20	3	—N/a
20–22 Oct 2023	(United States) 2023 Skate America	2	97.34	2	181.75	2	279.09
17–19 Nov 2023	(Finland) 2023 Grand Prix of Espoo	5	73.94	3	176.09	3	250.03
7–10 Dec 2023	(China) 2023–24 Grand Prix Final	5	93.20	6	126.71	6	219.91
11–14 Dec 2023	(France) 2024 French Championships	2	93.69	10	94.42	7	188.11
10–14 Jan 2024	(Lithuania) 2024 European Championships	31	57.33	—N/a	—N/a	31	57.33

Results in the 2024–25 season
Date	Event	SP		FS		Total	
Date	Event	P	Score	P	Score	P	Score
26–28 Sep 2024	(France) 2024 Master's de Patinage	1	83.38	10	84.33	7	167.71
18–20 Oct 2024	(United States) 2024 Skate America	4	92.04	1	190.84	2	282.88
15–17 Nov 2024	(Finland) 2024 Finlandia Trophy	3	85.13	2	174.02	2	259.15
5–8 Dec 2024	(France) 2024–25 Grand Prix Final	6	68.82	5	169.81	6	238.63
20–21 Dec 2024	(France) 2025 French Championships	1	89.58	1	174.50	1	264.08
28 Jan – 2 Feb 2025	(Estonia) 2025 European Championships	18	70.68	22	113.16	22	183.84
18–20 Feb 2025	(Italy) Road to 26 Trophy	2	88.08	1	172.99	1	261.07
25–30 Mar 2025	(United States) 2025 World Championships	4	93.63	7	178.89	5 (7)	272.52
17–20 Apr 2025	(Japan) 2025 World Team Trophy	6	88.07	7	165.34	4	253.41

Results in the 2025-26 season
Date	Event	SP		FS		Total	
Date	Event	P	Score	P	Score	P	Score
28–30 Aug 2025	(France) 2025 Master's de Patinage	1	97.09	1	176.97	1	274.06
25–27 Sep 2025	(Slovakia) 2025 CS Nepela Memorial	1	93.49	1	168.41	1	261.90
31 Oct – 2 November 2025	2025 Skate Canada International	5	87.46	11	142.64	10	230.10
14–16 Nov 2025	(United States) 2025 Skate America	2	93.56	2	159.971	1	253.53
3–6 Dec 2025	(Croatia) 2025 CS Golden Spin of Zagreb	1	87.52	1	152.00	1	239.52
18–20 Dec 2025	(France) 2026 French Championships	1	88.10	1	185.32	1	273.42
13–18 Jan 2026	(United Kingdom) 2026 European Championships	27	53.95	—N/a	—N/a	27	53.95
6–8 Feb 2026	(Italy) 2026 Winter Olympics – Team event	4	88.05	—N/a	—N/a	6	—N/a
10–13 Feb 2026	(Italy) 2026 Winter Olympics	7	92.64	11	167.30	11	259.94
24–29 Mar 2026	(Czech Republic) 2026 World Championships	11	84.74	5	184.39	7	269.13

Results in the 2026-27 season
Date	Event	SP		FS		Total	
Date	Event	P	Score	P	Score	P	Score
15–18 Oct 2026	(Hungary) 2026 CS Budapest Trophy	11	70.63	4	156.20	5	226.83
30 Oct – 1 Nov 2026	2026 Skate Canada International	2	90.26	2	168.17	1	258.43

=== Junior level ===
Results in the 2012–13 season
Date	Event	SP		FS		Total	
Date	Event	P	Score	P	Score	P	Score
4–6 Oct 2012	(France) 2012 Master's de Patinage	5	42.87	3	97.43	4	140.30
15–17 Feb 2013	(France) 2013 French Championships (Junior)	4	50.50	3	104.70	3	155.20
2–3 Apr 2013	(Italy) 2013 Gardena Spring Trophy	4	51.53	4	85.71	4	137.24

Results in the 2013–14 season
Date	Event	SP		FS		Total	
Date	Event	P	Score	P	Score	P	Score
19–22 Sep 2013	(Italy) 2013 Lombardia Trophy	2	46.83	1	99.01	1	145.84
28 Feb – 2 Mar 2014	(France) 2014 French Championships (Junior)	3	52.43	3	98.50	3	150.93
29–30 Mar 2014	(Italy) 2014 Gardena Spring Trophy	2	53.60	3	88.97	3	142.57

Results in the 2014–15 season
Date	Event	SP		FS		Total	
Date	Event	P	Score	P	Score	P	Score
18–21 Sep 2014	(Italy) 2014 Lombardia Trophy	1	55.91	2	86.59	1	142.50
2–4 Oct 2014	(France) 2014 Master's de Patinage	2	56.92	2	113.58	2	170.50
15–19 Oct 2014	(France) 2014 International Cup of Nice	5	44.22	2	111.11	3	155.33
20–22 Feb 2015	(France) 2015 French Championships (Junior)	1	65.57	1	123.32	1	188.89

Results in the 2015–16 season
Date	Event	SP		FS		Total	
Date	Event	P	Score	P	Score	P	Score
26–29 Aug 2015	2015 JGP Latvia	4	63.76	4	123.24	4	187.00
8–10 Oct 2015	(France) 2015 Master's de Patinage	1	63.76	1	120.57	1	184.33
27–28 Feb 2016	(France) 2016 French Championships (Junior)	1	65.14	1	123.92	1	189.06
14–20 Mar 2016	(Hungary) 2016 World Junior Championships	5	75.53	11	122.23	9	197.76

Results in the 2016–17 season
Date	Event	SP		FS		Total	
Date	Event	P	Score	P	Score	P	Score
24–27 Aug 2016	2016 JGP France	3	64.74	5	121.15	4	185.89
21–24 Sep 2016	2016 JGP Slovenia	7	61.49	4	133.32	6	194.81
15–19 Mar 2017	(Taiwan) 2017 World Junior Championships	6	77.24	8	141.39	7	218.63
