= So Far =

So Far may refer to:

== Literature ==
- So Far..., 1995 autobiography by Kelsey Grammer

== Music ==
=== Albums ===
- So Far, 1972 album by Cochise (band)
- So Far (Crosby, Stills, Nash & Young album), 1974
- So Far (Sharon O'Neill album), 1984
- So Far (Dragon album), 1988
- So Far, 1997 compilation album by Eileen Ivers
- So Far... The Best Of, 1997 compilation album by Sinéad O'Connor
- ...So Far, 1999 album by D. D. Jackson
- So Far, 2001 EP by Tony Lucca
- So Far, 2006 compilation album by Martin Solveig
- So Far: The Acoustic Sessions, 2008 album by Bethany Dillon
- So Far (Faust album), 1972, a/k/a Faust So Far

=== Film and video ===
- Grateful Dead: So Far, 1987 music documentary about Grateful Dead
- So Far, 2005 music documentary about Section 25 (band)

=== Songs ===
- "So Far (Rodgers and Hammerstein song)", show tune from Rodgers and Hammerstein 1947 musical Allegro
- "So Far", song from Faust 1972 album Faust So Far
- Life's been good to me so far, lyric from Joe Walsh 1978 song "Life's Been Good" (also sampled on Eminem song)
- "So Far", 1992 song by The Heart Throbs (band)
- "So Far (Eminem song)" song by Eminem from MMLP2, 2013

== See also ==
- So Far Away (disambiguation)
- So Far Gone (disambiguation)
