= One 2.3 Four =

Single by Martin Solveig

from the album C'est la Vie
- Released: 22 December 2008
- Genre: Electro house
- Length: 3:11
- Label: Mixture Stereophonic; Universal
- Songwriter(s): Martin Solveig
- Producer(s): Martin Solveig

Martin Solveig singles chronology
"I Want You" (2008)	"One 2.3 Four" (2008)	"Boys & Girls" (2009)

"One 2.3 Four" is a song by French DJ and record producer Martin Solveig. The song was released in France as a digital download on 22 December 2008. It was released as the third single from his third studio album C'est la Vie (2008). The song was written and produced by Martin Solveig.

== Track listing ==
CD single
No.	Title	Length
1.	"One.2.3.Four"	3:11

== Charts ==
Chart (2009)	Peak position
Belgium (Ultratip Bubbling Under Flanders)	2
Belgium (Ultratip Bubbling Under Wallonia)	7
France Download (SNEP)	26

== Release history ==
Region	Date	Format	Label
France	22 December 2008	Digital download	Mixture Stereophonic
