= François Polgár =

French choral conductor, organist, composer and musicologist

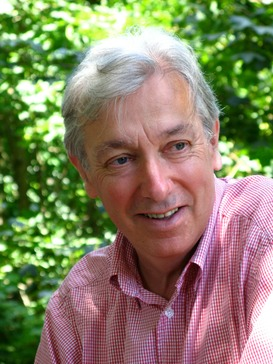
- Born: 19 October 1946 (age 79); Boulogne-Billancourt, France
- Education: Conservatoire de Paris; Schola Cantorum de Paris
- Occupations: Choral conductor; Conductor (music); Classical organist; Music educator
- Awards: Ordre des Arts et des Lettres; Victoire de la musique classique

François Polgár (born 19 October 1946) is a contemporary French choral conductor, organist, composer and musicologist.

== Biography ==
=== Family ===
Polgár was born in Boulogne-Billancourt, the son of André Polgár, an engineer, CEO and Catherine Gauthier, an artist painter.

On 25 April 1970, he married Kinga Bonay. Together they have a child.

=== Training ===
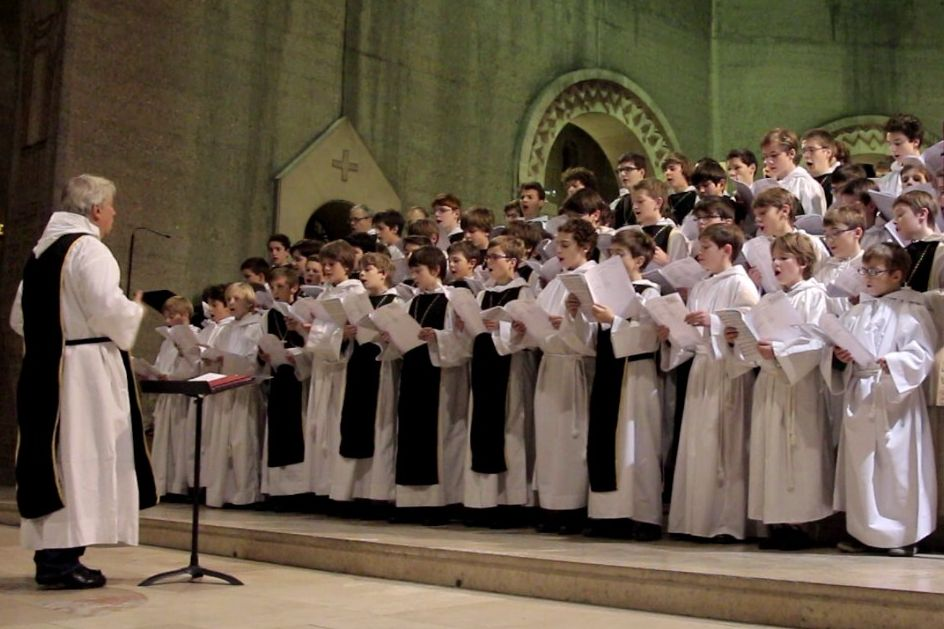
François Polgár in 2012, conducting the Petits chanteurs de Sainte-Croix de Neuilly in concert.

A former pupil at the institution Notre-Dame de Sainte-Croix in Neuilly-sur-Seine, Polgár obtained his baccalaureat in 1964 and then pursued musical studies. Following his La messe de requiem en France sous les règnes de Louis XIII and Louis XIV, he obtained a master's degree in musicology and the Certificat d'aptitude au professorat de l'enseignement du second degré (CAPES) of music.

Polgár studied harmony at the Conservatoire de Paris (CNSMD) and the Schola Cantorum de Paris, at the same time as the organ at the École César Franck where he graduated in organ. He also holds a master's degree in musicology and a certificate of aptitude for musical education (CAEM) from the University of Paris IV-Sorbonne.

He integrated the boys' choir Petits chanteurs de Sainte-Croix de Neuilly as a singer, then organist and pianist, and finally as choir conductor since 1983. His students included Martin Picandet, who made himself known under the name Martin Solveig.

=== Career ===
He was organist and Kapellmeister of the churches of Saint-Cloud from 1964 to 1980 and also conductor of the Choir and the Baroque Ensemble of Saint-Cloud from 1972 to 1984.

He was co-founder in 1974 of the Gregorian Choir of Paris. A specialist of Gregorian chant, he made several discographic recordings there, two of which were recorded by Erato.

After having taught harmony at the Sorbonne from 1971 to 1980, in 1980, he was appointed deputy choir director at the Paris Opera, a position he held until 1992.

From 1992 to 2001, he was conductor of the choirs of Radio France, "the only large French professional choir with a symphonic vocation". At the head of this internationally renowned choir, he was able to work in collaboration with the most prestigious conductors (James Conlon, Seiji Ozawa, Georges Prêtre...), and perform most of the major choral works in the lyrical and symphonic repertoire from the 18th to the present day.

From his training as an organist and musicologist (taking into account his work for his thesis on musicology), Polgár was confronted with the problems of interpretation of 17th century music, which he often conducted at the head of early music ensembles.

A music educator, Polgár has been in charge of the musical training of the Paris seminarians since 1990 and the seminarians of Nanterre since 2006. A lecturer at the Cathedral School, he is also a consultant and broadcaster on the television channel KTO.

Since 1983, Polgár conducts the choir in Sainte-Croix de Neuilly with which he regularly gives concerts, organises tours and records CDs.

In 1997, with the choir of Radio France, he received a Victoire de la musique classique in the "Ensemble vocal" category for the recording of the Gloria by Francis Poulenc.

During the visit of Pope Benedict XVI to Paris on 13 September 2008, Polgár was chosen as co-director of the choir of more than 2000 choristers gathered on the esplanade of the Invalides.

In 2009–2010, Polgár was musical advisor and singing director, for the film Of Gods and Men by Xavier Beauvois about the murder of the monks of Tibhirine (Grand prix du Festival de Cannes in 2010, 2010 Cannes Ecumenical Ecumenical Jury Award, 2010 Cannes Festival Éducation Nationale Prize, with Lambert Wilson in the role of superior Christian de Chergé and Michael Lonsdale in the role of Brother Doctor Luc).

Since 2010, Polgár has been performing regularly with his boys' choir the Petits chanteurs de Sainte-Croix de Neuilly, with pieces such as the opera Dido and Aeneas by Purcell, the Requiem by Mozart and Fauré, and more recently in 2015, with cantatas BWV 4 (Christ lag in Todesbanden) and BWV 140 (Wachet auf, ruft uns die Stimme) by Johann-Sebastian Bach, which he performed with the Orchestre de musique sacrée de Paris.

== Discography ==
The WorldCat database lists a hundred disc/CD references since the recordings with the Gregorien choir of Paris (Mort et résurrection at Erato in 1982, Liturgie du vendredi saint - Liturgie de la semaine sainte 2 CD at Erato in 1993…). One of the last recordings is of works by Gabriel Fauré: Requiem, Cantique de Jean Racine, Ave Verum.

Since 2013, the Petits Chanteurs de Sainte-Croix de Neuilly choir which he conducts is working in partnership with the Sony Classical label, which re-released a number of older productions, and with which he has recorded several albums.

== Distinctions ==
In 1985, Polgár received the "Renaissance des Arts" Prize.

Polgár holds the rank of chevalier in the ordre des Arts et des Lettres. He is promoted to the rank of officer on 19 March 2019.
