= Rocking Music =

2004 single by Martin Solveig

Single by Martin Solveig

from the album Sur la terre
- Released: 16 February 2004
- Length: 3:37
- Label: Universal Licensing Music
- Songwriter: Martin Solveig
- Producer: Martin Solveig

Martin Solveig singles chronology
"Madan" (2003)	"Rocking Music" (2004)	"I'm a Good Man" (2004)

Music video
- "Rocking Music" on YouTube

"Rocking Music" is a song written, produced, and performed by French DJ and record producer Martin Solveig. The song was released on 16 February 2004 and was the second single from Solveig's debut studio album, Sur la terre (2002). "Rocking Music" peaked at number 47 on the French Singles Chart and number 35 on the UK Singles Chart.

== Music video ==
The music video is about a girl with black ink. The girl has black ink for almost two minutes, at which point rain starts to fall, and the ink on her dissolves into a lighter skin. At the end, her lips turn black.

== Track listing ==
CD single and digital download
No.	Title	Length
1.	"Rocking Music" (Radio Edit)	3:37
2.	"Rocking Music" (Main Vocal)	7:36
3.	"Rocking Music" (Dub)	6:57

== Charts ==
=== Weekly charts ===
Chart (2003–2004)	Peak position
Australia (ARIA)	39
Australian Club Chart (ARIA)	2
Australian Dance (ARIA)	4
Belgium (Ultratip Bubbling Under Flanders)	4
Belgium (Ultratip Bubbling Under Wallonia)	14
Belgium Dance (Ultratop Flanders)	1
France (SNEP)	47
Hungary (Dance Top 40)	32
Ireland Dance (IRMA)	4
Netherlands (Dutch Top 40)	37
Netherlands (Single Top 100)	82
Scotland Singles (Official Charts)	47
UK Singles (Official Charts)	35
UK Dance (Official Charts)	1
UK Indie (Official Charts)	3

=== Year-end charts ===
Chart (2004)	Position
Australian Club Chart (ARIA)	18

== Release history ==
Region	Date	Format(s)	Label(s)	Ref.
Australia	16 February 2004	CD single	Mixture Stereophonic	
France	17 February 2004	CD single; digital download	Universal Licensing Music	
United Kingdom	12 April 2004	12-inch vinyl; CD single	Defected	
