= Petits chanteurs de Sainte-Croix de Neuilly =

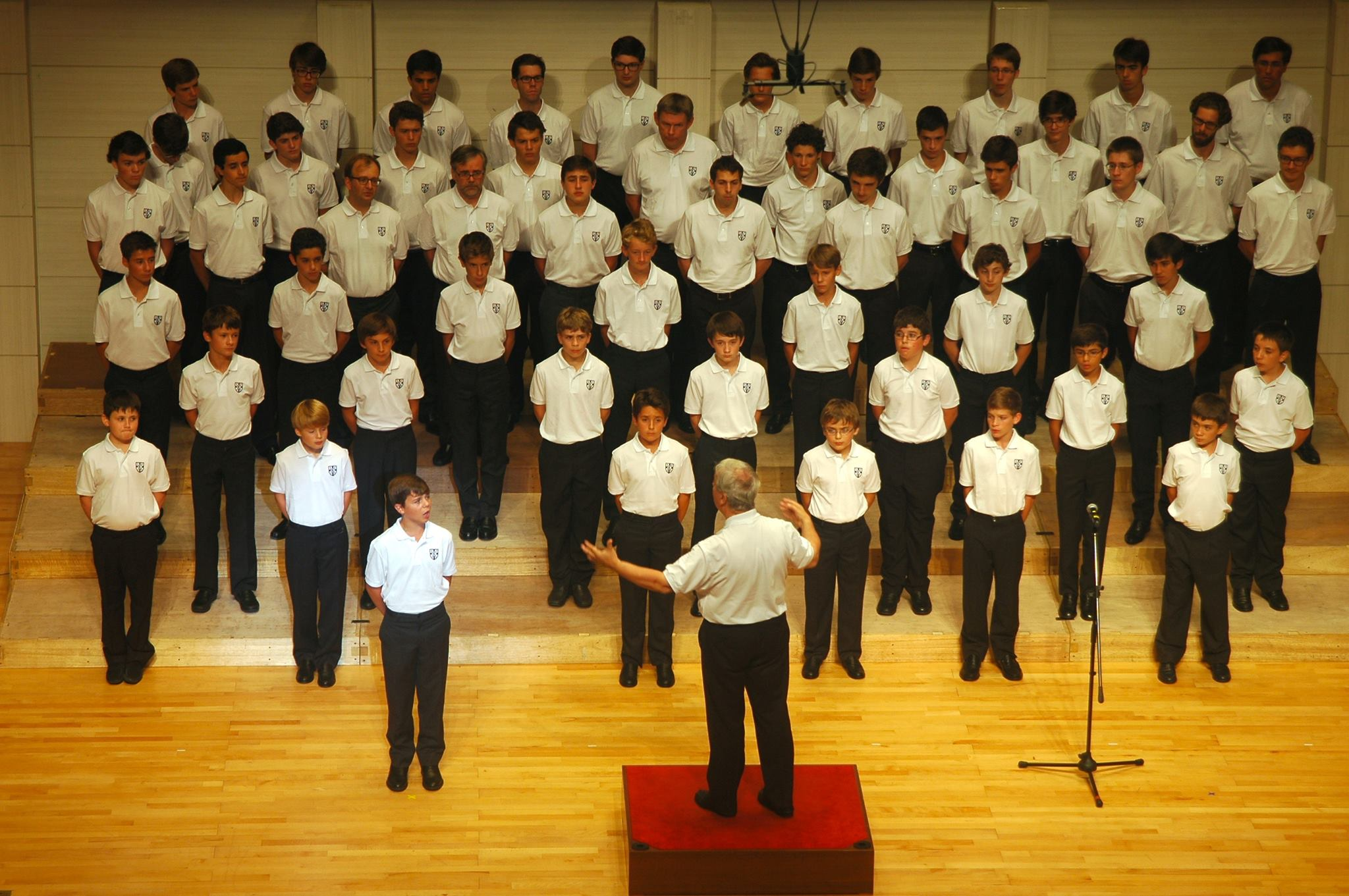
The Paris Boys Choir during concert in Seoul - August 2013.

The Paris Boys Choir (Les Petits Chanteurs de Sainte-Croix de Neuilly) is a boys' choir created in 1956 at Collège Sainte-Croix de Neuilly in Neuilly-sur-Seine, Hauts-de-Seine, France.

Louis Prudhomme founded the choir in 1956, as a revival to one of the Collège's oldest institutions: the Schola, an elite choir born at the same time as Sainte-Croix itself and much celebrated at the time by poet and alumnus Henry de Montherlant. Prudhomme significantly developed the choir's activities and built strong ties with the nascent Pueri Cantores federation, instituted by Monseigneur Maillet – the founder of Les Petits Chanteurs à la Croix de Bois – making it one France's utmost children's choirs.

In 1985, François Polgár – a Sainte-Croix alumnus who then successively became assistant director of Les Chœurs de l'Opéra de Paris and director of Le Chœur de Radio France – was asked by Prudhomme to succeed him. Faithful to his predecessor's philosophy and impetus, Polgár embarked the choir on a path of radical modernization. Les Petits Chanteurs de Sainte-Croix de Neuilly were redeployed into a "Maîtrise": a specially adapted curriculum was crafted at Sainte-Croix for boy pupils willing to practice intensive choir singing and live a unique experience based on music apprenticeship and teamwork, while pursuing regular academic studies.

The choir contributes to the Collège's milestone ceremonies and is at the heart of the students' musical experience. It makes frequent appearances in world-class festivals (Oxford, Aix-en-Provence, Auvers-sur-Oise, Wengen, etc.) and regularly performs great pieces with orchestra (Mozart's Requiem, Fauré's Requiem, Handel's Messiah, etc.). Its repertoire also includes a variety of a cappella liturgical and profane songs.

Every summer, The Paris Boys Choir go on tour, in France and around the world. They have performed in every region in France, and they have also sung including the US, the UK, Switzerland, Italy, Spain, Canada, numerous Eastern European countries.

François Polgár trained the actors of the movie Of Gods and Men who were to play monks in the Cistercian and Gregorian chants. French DJ and producer Martin Solveig was a soprano soloist in The Paris Boys Choir as he was a child, under the direction of François Polgár.

On its website, The Paris Boys Choir reassess the singer's mission statement: "Through our singing and our actions as 'Missionaries of Peace', we pledge to deepen our spiritual reflection and that of our public. Through our hard work, recordings and live performances, we seek ever improving musical quality and vow to contribute to the renewal of the French children's choir school."

== See also ==
- List of choirs
