= Blow (Martin Solveig song) =

Single by Martin Solveig and Laidback Luke
- Released: 6 January 2014
- Genre: Electro house
- Length: 2:51 (Radio Edit)
- Label: Mixmash; Spinnin'
- Songwriter(s): Martin Solveig; Laidback Luke
- Producer(s): Martin Solveig; Laidback Luke

Martin Solveig singles chronology
"Hey Now" (2013)	"Blow" (2014)	"Intoxicated" (2015)

"Blow" is a song by French DJ and record producer Martin Solveig and Filipino-Dutch DJ and producer Laidback Luke. The song was released in France as a digital download on 6 January 2014. The song was written and produced by Martin Solveig and Julio Mejia and Laidback Luke.

== Music video ==
A music video to accompany the release of "Blow" was first released onto YouTube on 18 December 2013 at a total length of four minutes and thirty-six seconds.

== Track listing ==
Digital download
No.	Title	Length
1.	"Blow" (Radio Edit)	2:51
2.	"Blow"	5:00

== Chart performance ==
=== Weekly charts ===
Chart (2015)	Peak position
Belgium (Ultratip Bubbling Under Flanders)	32
Belgium (Ultratip Bubbling Under Wallonia)	30

== Release history ==
Region	Date	Format	Label
France	6 January 2014	Digital download	Temps D'avance
