= Rejection (song) =

Single by Martin Solveig

from the album Hedonist
- Released: 2 July 2007 (France)
- Genre: Funky house
- Length: 3:37
- Label: Mixture Stereophonic; Universal Licensing Music; Defected
- Songwriter(s): Martin Solveig
- Producer(s): Martin Solveig

Martin Solveig singles chronology
"Something Better" (2006)	"Rejection" (2007)	"C'est la Vie" (2008)

"Rejection" is a song by Martin Solveig. The song was released in France as a CD single on 2 July 2007. It was released as the fourth and final single from his second studio album Hedonist (2005). Solveig wrote and produced the song, which peaked at number 34 on the French Singles Chart.

== Track listing ==
CD single (Universal)
No.	Title	Length
1.	"Rejection" (Radio Edit)	3:37
2.	"Rejection" (Bob Sinclar Remix)	5:07
3.	"Rejection" (Ian Carey Remix)	6:52
4.	"Rejection" (Erick E Club Mix)	8:37
5.	"Rejection" (Erick E Dub)	8:38
6.	"Rejection" (Trickski Main Mix)	8:34
7.	"Rejection" (Trickski Darque Deube)	8:34
8.	"Rejection" (Stylophonic Club Mix)	6:50
9.	"Rejection" (Stylophonic Dub)	6:50
10.	"Rejection" (Original Club Edit)	5:06
11.	"Rejection" (Ex-Echo Remix)	6:44

== Chart performance ==
=== Weekly charts ===
Chart (2007)	Peak position
Belgium (Ultratip Bubbling Under Flanders)	7
Belgium (Ultratip Bubbling Under Wallonia)	2
France (SNEP)	34
Hungary (Dance Top 40)	32
Hungary (Single Top 40)	10
Italy (FIMI)	23
Switzerland (Schweizer Hitparade)	55

== Release history ==
Region	Date	Format	Label
France	2 July 2007	CD single	Universal Licensing Music
