= Moffou =

Studio album by Salif Keita
- Released: 2002
- Recorded: 2001
- Genre: World music
- Length: 60:52
- Language: Malinké
- Label: Universal Jazz France
- Producer: Salif Keita, Jean Lamoot, Freddy Zerbib

Salif Keita chronology
| Sosie (2001) | Moffou (2002) | The Best of the Early Years (2002) |

Moffou is the tenth studio album by Malian singer Salif Keita. It was recorded during July and August 2001 at Les Studios De La Seine in Paris, France. Moffou was released in 2002 by Universal Jazz France. The song "Yamore" features the Cape Verdean singer Cesária Évora.

== Track listing ==
1. "Yamore" (featuring Cesária Évora)
2. "Iniagige"
3. "Madan"
4. "Katolon"
5. "Souvent"
6. "Moussolou"
7. "Baba"
8. "Ananamin"
9. "Koukou"
10. "Here"
