= Everybody (Martin Solveig song) =

2005 single by Martin Solveig

Single by Martin Solveig

from the album Hedonist
- Released: 25 July 2005
- Length: 4:19
- Label: Mixture Stereophonic
- Songwriter(s): Martin Solveig
- Producer(s): Martin Solveig

Martin Solveig singles chronology
"I'm a Good Man" (2004)	"Everybody" (2005)	"Jealousy" (2006)

"Everybody" is a song by French DJ and record producer Martin Solveig. The song's vocals are performed by soul singer Lee Fields. It was released as the lead single from Solveig's second studio album, Hedonist (2005). Written and produced by Solveig, "Everybody" was released as a single on 25 July 2005. The song peaked at number 37 on the French Singles Chart and number 22 on the UK Singles Chart.

== Track listings ==
CD single
No.	Title	Length
1.	"Everybody" (radio edit)	3:31
2.	"Destiny" (Nu Disco mix)	6:31

Extras
No.	Title	Length
3.	"Everybody" (video)

== Charts ==
Chart (2005–2006)	Peak position
Australia (ARIA)	33
Belgium (Ultratop 50 Flanders)	28
Belgium (Ultratop 50 Wallonia)	27
France (SNEP)	37
Hungary (Dance Top 40)	18
Scotland (OCC)	14
UK Singles (OCC)	22
UK Dance (OCC)	1
UK Indie (OCC)	2

== Release history ==
Region	Date	Format	Label	Ref.
United Kingdom	25 July 2005	12-inch vinyl; CD	Defected	
Australia	15 August 2005	CD single	Universal	
