= Madan (song) =

Single by Martin Solveig featuring Salif Keita

from the album Sur la terre
- Released: 16 June 2003 (France)
- Genre: Afro house, worldbeat
- Length: 3:38 (Exotic Disco Edit)
- Label: Mixture Stereophonic; Universal Music Jazz
- Songwriters: Salif Keita; Martin Solveig
- Producer: Martin Solveig

Martin Solveig singles chronology
"Madan" (2003)	"Rocking Music" (2004)

"Madan (Exotic Disco Mix)" is the debut single by French DJ and record producer Martin Solveig, with Malian singer Salif Keita. The song was released in France as a digital download on 16 June 2003, and is from Solveig's debut studio album Sur la terre (2002). It is a remix of "Madan" by Salif Keita, first released in 2002 for the album Moffou. The song peaked at number 37 on the French Singles Chart.

== Track listing ==
CD single
No.	Title	Length
1.	"Madan" (Exotic Disco Edit)	3:38
2.	"Madan" (Exotic Disco)	7:37

== Chart performance ==
=== Weekly charts ===
Chart (2003)	Peak position
Belgium (Ultratip Bubbling Under Wallonia)	14
France (SNEP)	37
Italy (FIMI)	17
Netherlands (Single Top 100)	87
Switzerland (Schweizer Hitparade)	66

== Release history ==
Region	Date	Format	Label
France	16 June 2003	CD single	Universal Music Group
