= C'est la Vie (Martin Solveig song) =

Single by Martin Solveig

from the album C'est la Vie
- Released: 21 January 2008 (France); 18 April 2008 (Spain); May 2008 (Italy)
- Genre: Electro house
- Length: 3:23
- Label: Mixture Stereophonic; Universal
- Songwriter(s): Martin Solveig
- Producer(s): Martin Solveig

Martin Solveig singles chronology
"Rejection" (2007)	"C'est la Vie" (2008)	"I Want You" (2008)

"C'est la Vie" is a song by French DJ and record producer Martin Solveig. The song was released in the France as a digital download on 21 January 2008. It was released as the lead single from his third studio album C'est la Vie (2008). The song was written and produced by Martin Solveig. The song has charted in Belgium, Spain and Switzerland.

== Track listing ==
Digital download
No.	Title	Length
1.	"C'est la vie" (Radio Edit)	3:23

== Chart performance ==
=== Weekly charts ===
Chart (2008)	Peak position
Belgium (Ultratip Bubbling Under Flanders)	3
Belgium (Ultratip Bubbling Under Wallonia)	9
France Download (SNEP)	45
Hungary (Dance Top 40)	26
Spain (PROMUSICAE)	12
Switzerland (Schweizer Hitparade)	63

== Release history ==
Region	Date	Format	Label
France	21 January 2008	Digital download	Universal
