= I'm a Good Man =

Single by Martin Solveig

from the album Sur la terre
- Released: June 2004 (United Kingdom)
- Genre: Deep house
- Length: 5:50
- Label: Mixture Stereophonic; Universal Licensing Music Electro; Defected
- Songwriter(s): Martin Solveig
- Producer(s): Martin Solveig

Martin Solveig singles chronology
"Rocking Music" (2004)	"I'm a Good Man" (2004)	"Everybody" (2005)

"I'm a Good Man" is a song by French DJ and record producer Martin Solveig. The song was released in the United Kingdom as a digital download in June 2004. It was released as the third and final single from his debut studio album Sur la terre (2002). The song was written and produced by Martin Solveig. The song peaked at number 57 on the UK Singles Chart.

== Track listing ==
CD single
No.	Title	Length
1.	"I'm a Good Man"	5:50

== Chart performance ==
=== Weekly charts ===
Chart (2004)	Peak position
UK Singles (OCC)	57

== Release history ==
Region	Date	Format	Label
United Kingdom	June 2004	CD single	Universal Licensing Music
