= Intoxicated (Martin Solveig and GTA song) =

Single by Martin Solveig and GTA
- Released: 19 January 2015
- Genre: Future house
- Length: 4:17; 2:39 (radio edit)
- Label: Spinnin' Deep; Spinnin'
- Songwriters: Martin Solveig; Julio Mejia; Matthew Toth
- Producers: Martin Solveig; Julio Mejia; Matthew Toth

Martin Solveig singles chronology
"Blow" (2014)	"Intoxicated" (2015)	"+1" (2015)

GTA singles chronology
"Hard House" (2014)	"Intoxicated" (2015)

"Intoxicated" is a song by French DJ and record producer Martin Solveig and American electronic duo GTA. The song was released as a digital download in the Netherlands on 19 January 2015 and in France on 23 February 2015. The song peaked at number 15 on the French Singles Chart and number 5 on the UK Singles Chart, giving Martin Solveig his first UK top 10 single. The song also charted in Austria, Belgium, Germany, Ireland, Netherlands, Scotland and Switzerland.

== Music video ==
A music video to accompany the release of "Intoxicated" was first released onto YouTube on 19 January 2015 at a total length of three minutes and fourteen seconds. As of 2024, the music video has received over 198 million views on YouTube.

== In popular culture ==
The song was Chicago Cubs first baseman Anthony Rizzo's walk-up music.

Intoxicated is playable on Just Dance Unlimited as part of Just Dance 2021

Intoxicated also appeared in the video game Rocket League.

In 2018 and 2019, the song was featured in an advertising campaign for Pine-Sol, dubbed the "Cleaning Dance Challenge".

== Track listing ==
Digital download – single
No.	Title	Length
1.	"Intoxicated"	4:17

Digital download – remixes
No.	Title	Length
1.	"Intoxicated" (Zeds Dead Remix)	4:02
2.	"Intoxicated" (Wiwek Remix)	4:18
3.	"Intoxicated" (Sleepy Tom Remix)	4:19
4.	"Intoxicated" (Arkadiian & Whiiite Remix 2015)	4:24

== Charts ==
=== Weekly charts ===
Chart (2015)	Peak position
Australia (ARIA)	81
Austria (Ö3 Austria Top 40)	23
Belgium (Ultratop 50 Flanders)	6
Belgium (Ultratop 50 Wallonia)	8
France (SNEP)	15
Germany (GfK)	11
Hungary (Dance Top 40)	11
Ireland (IRMA)	26
Netherlands (Dutch Top 40)	9
Netherlands (Single Top 100)	11
Scotland Singles (Official Charts)	4
Switzerland (Schweizer Hitparade)	33
UK Singles (Official Charts)	5
UK Dance (Official Charts)	2
US Hot Dance/Electronic Songs (Billboard)	27

=== Year-end charts ===
Chart (2015)	Position
Belgium (Ultratop Flanders)	24
Belgium (Ultratop Wallonia)	35
France (SNEP)	52
Germany (Official German Charts)	31
Hungary (Dance Top 40)	40
Netherlands (Dutch Top 40)	30
Netherlands (Single Top 100)	30
UK Singles (Official Charts Company)	71
US Hot Dance/Electronic Songs (Billboard)	58
Chart (2016)	Position
Hungary (Dance Top 40)	93

== Certifications ==
Region	Certification	Certified units/sales
Belgium (BRMA)	Platinum	20,000^{‡}
Denmark (IFPI Danmark)	Gold	45,000^{‡}
Germany (BVMI)	3× Gold	600,000^{‡}
Italy (FIMI)	2× Platinum	100,000^{‡}
New Zealand (RMNZ)	Platinum	30,000^{‡}
Poland (ZPAV)	Gold	25,000^{‡}
Spain (Promusicae)	Gold	30,000^{‡}
United Kingdom (BPI)	Platinum	600,000^{‡}
^{‡} Sales+streaming figures based on certification alone.

== Release history ==
Region	Date	Format	Label
France	23 February 2015	Digital download	Spinnin' Deep; Spinnin'
