= Hey Now (Martin Solveig song) =

Single by Martin Solveig and The Cataracs featuring Kyle
- Released: 27 May 2013
- Genre: Eurohouse; electro house
- Length: 3:07
- Label: Mixture Stereophonic; Spinnin'
- Songwriters: Kyle Harvey; Martin Solveig; Niles Hollowell-Dhar; Petros Anastos-Prastacos
- Producers: Martin Solveig; The Cataracs

Martin Solveig singles chronology
"The Night Out" (2012)	"Hey Now" (2013)	"Blow" (2014)

The Cataracs singles chronology
"Big Dipper" (2013)	"Hey Now" (2013)	"Dagger" (2013)

"Hey Now" is a song performed by French DJ and record producer Martin Solveig and The Cataracs, featuring American rapper Kyle. The song was released in France as a digital download on 27 May 2013. The song charted in eight countries in Europe in 2013.

== Music video ==
A music video to accompany the release of "Hey Now" was first released onto YouTube with a total length of 3 minutes.

== Track listing ==
Digital download
No.	Title	Length
1.	"Hey Now" (feat. Kyle)	3:07

== Charts ==
=== Weekly charts ===
Chart (2013)	Peak position
Austria (Ö3 Austria Top 40)	8
Belgium (Ultratop 50 Flanders)	31
Belgium (Ultratop 50 Wallonia)	43
France (SNEP)	55
Germany (GfK)	10
Hungary (Rádiós Top 40)	28
Ireland (IRMA)	8
Poland (Dance Top 50)	17
Slovenia (SloTop50)	39
US Hot Dance/Electronic Songs (Billboard)	36

=== Year-end charts ===
Chart (2013)	Position
Austria (Ö3 Austria Top 40)	60
Germany (Official German Charts)	81

== Certifications ==
Region	Certification	Certified units/sales
Germany (BVMI)	Gold	150,000^{‡}
^{‡} Sales+streaming figures based on certification alone.

== Release history ==
Region	Date	Format	Label
France	27 May 2013	Digital download	Big Beat
