= So Far Gone =

So Far Gone may refer to:

- So Far Gone (mixtape), Drake mixtape
- So Far Gone (EP), Drake EP
- "So Far Gone" (song), James Blunt song
- "So Far Gone", Moby song from 18 B Sides + DVD
- "So Far Gone", The Early Years song
- So Far Gone (novel), a 2025 novel by Jess Walter
