= Do It Right (Martin Solveig song) =

Single by Martin Solveig featuring Tkay Maidza
- Released: 20 May 2016
- Genre: Future house
- Length: 3:33
- Label: Spinnin' Records; Virgin EMI
- Songwriter(s): Martin Solveig; Takudzwa Maidza
- Producer(s): Martin Solveig

Martin Solveig singles chronology
"+1" (2015)	"Do It Right" (2016)	"Places" (2016)

Tkay Maidza singles chronology
"Ghost" (2015)	"Do It Right" (2016)	"Carry On" (2016)

"Do It Right" is a song by French DJ and record producer Martin Solveig featuring vocals from Australian singer and rapper Tkay Maidza. It was released as a digital download in France on 20 May 2016 through Spinnin' Records and Big Beat. The song was written by Solveig and Maidza.

At the 2016 South Australian Music Awards, Solveig and Maidza won Best International Collaboration.

== Music video ==
A music video to accompany the release of "Do It Right" was first released onto YouTube on 2 June 2016 at a total length of three minutes and five seconds. The video features the iconic La Muralla Roja building and the surrounding area in Calpe, Spain.

== Track listing ==
Digital download
No.	Title	Length
1.	"Do It Right" (featuring Tkay Maidza)	3:33

== Chart performance ==
=== Weekly charts ===
Chart (2016–17)	Peak position
Australia (ARIA)	56
Austria (Ö3 Austria Top 40)	72
Belgium (Ultratop 50 Flanders)	31
Belgium (Ultratip Bubbling Under Wallonia)	19
Czech Republic (Rádio – Top 100)	29
France (SNEP)	48
Germany (GfK)	41
Hungary (Rádiós Top 40)	39
Ireland (IRMA)	81
Scotland (OCC)	63
UK Singles (OCC)	97

=== Year-end charts ===
Chart (2016)	Position
Argentina (Monitor Latino)	81
Belgium (Ultratop Flanders)	91

== Certifications ==
Region	Certification	Certified units/sales
France (SNEP)	Gold	66,666^{‡}
Germany (BVMI)	Gold	200,000^{‡}
Italy (FIMI)	Gold	25,000^{‡}
United Kingdom (BPI)	Gold	400,000^{‡}
^{‡} Sales+streaming figures based on certification alone.

== Release date ==
Region	Date	Format	Label
France	20 May 2016	Digital download	Spinnin' Records; Big Beat
