= I Want You (Martin Solveig song) =

Single by Martin Solveig featuring Lee Fields

from the album C'est la Vie
- Released: 15 September 2008 (France)
- Genre: Electro house
- Length: 3:26
- Label: Mixture Stereophonic; Universal
- Songwriter: Martin Solveig
- Producer: Martin Solveig

Martin Solveig singles chronology
"C'est la Vie" (2008)	"I Want You" (2008)	"One 2.3 Four" (2008)

"I Want You" is a song performed by French DJ and record producer Martin Solveig featuring Lee Fields. The song was released in the France as a digital download on 15 September 2008. It was released as the second single from his third studio album C'est la Vie (2008). The song was written and produced by Martin Solveig and peaked at number 59 on the French Singles Chart.

== Track listing ==
CD single
No.	Title	Length
1.	"I Want You" (Original Radio Edit)	3:26
2.	"I Want You" (Laidback Luke Remix)	7:34
3.	"I Want You" (Tepr Remix)	4:53
4.	"I Want You" (Original Club Mix)	6:42

== Chart performance ==
=== Weekly charts ===
Chart (2008)	Peak position
Belgium (Ultratip Bubbling Under Flanders)	4
Belgium (Ultratop 50 Wallonia)	37
France (SNEP)	59

== Release history ==
Region	Date	Format	Label
France	15 September 2008	Digital download	Mixture Stereophonic
