= +1 (song) =

Single by Martin Solveig featuring Sam White
- Released: 6 July 2015
- Genre: Future house
- Length: 3:12 (radio edit)
- Label: Spinnin' Deep; Spinnin' Records
- Songwriter(s): Martin Solveig; Samantha Urbani; Cass Lowe
- Producer(s): Martin Solveig

Martin Solveig singles chronology
"Intoxicated" (2015)	"+1" (2015)	"Do It Right" (2016)

Music video
- "+1" on YouTube

"+1" is a single by French DJ and record producer Martin Solveig featuring British singer Sam White (vocals). The track was released in France as a digital download on 6 July 2015. It was written by Solveig, Samantha Urbani and C. Low. "+1" peaked at number 31 on the French Singles Chart, and also charted in Belgium and the Netherlands.

The song was given an official UK release on 4 December 2015, hoping to emulate the success of the previous single "Intoxicated".

== Music video ==
A music video to accompany the release of "+1" was first released on YouTube on 8 June 2015 at a total length of three minutes and thirteen seconds.

== Track listing ==
Digital download
No.	Title	Length
1.	"+1" (featuring Sam White) (Radio Edit)	3:12

Digital download - Remixes (Part 1)
No.	Title	Length
1.	"+1" (Tujamo Remix)	4:14
2.	"+1" (Format:B Remix)	6:02

Digital download - Remixes (Part 2)
No.	Title	Length
1.	"+1" (Dirtcaps Remix)	3:26

== Charts ==
=== Weekly charts ===
Chart (2015)	Peak position
Belgium (Ultratop 50 Flanders)	27
Belgium (Ultratop 50 Wallonia)	49
France (SNEP)	31
Germany (GfK)	38
Hungary (Dance Top 40)	28
Netherlands (Single Top 100)	76
UK Singles (OCC)	51

=== Year-end charts ===
Chart (2015)	Position
Hungary (Dance Top 40)	88

== Certifications ==
Region	Certification	Certified units/sales
Germany (BVMI)	Gold	200,000^{‡}
United Kingdom (BPI)	Silver	200,000^{‡}
^{‡} Sales+streaming figures based on certification alone.

== Release history ==
Region	Date	Format	Label
France	6 July 2015	Digital download	Spinnin' Deep; Spinnin'
