= C'est la Vie (Martin Solveig album) =

Studio album by Martin Solveig
- Released: 2 June 2008
- Recorded: 2007–2008
- Genre: House
- Length: 46:05
- Label: Universal Licensing Music; Mixture Stereophonic
- Producer: Martin Solveig; Michael Tordjman

Martin Solveig chronology
| Hedonist (2005) | C'est la Vie (2008) | Smash (2011) |

Singles from C'est la Vie
- 1. "C'est la Vie" Released: 21 January 2008; 2. "I Want You" Released: 15 September 2008; 3. "One 2.3 Four" Released: 22 December 2008; 4. "Boys & Girls" Released: 28 September 2009

C'est la Vie is the third studio album by French DJ and record producer Martin Solveig. It was released on 2 June 2008 by Universal Licensing Music and Mixture Stereophonic. It spawned the singles "C'est la Vie", "I Want You" and "One 2.3 Four". A special edition of the album, titled the Definitive Edition, was released on 28 September 2009, containing the single "Boys & Girls" and a bonus disc of remixes.

== Track listing ==
All songs written, composed and produced by Martin Solveig, except "Beauty False" and "Some Other Time" written and produced by Solveig and Michael Tordjman.

| No. | Title | Length |
|---|---|---|
| 1. | "C'est la Vie" (featuring Jay Sebag) | 3:23 |
| 2. | "I Want You" (featuring Lee Fields) | 4:25 |
| 3. | "Butterfly" (featuring Stephy Haïk) | 5:04 |
| 4. | "Beauty False" (performed by Martin Solveig) | 4:10 |
| 5. | "Poptimistic" (words by Gail Cochrane) | 1:19 |
| 6. | "One 2.3 Four" (featuring Chakib Chambi) | 4:00 |
| 7. | "Touch Me" (featuring Stephy Haik) | 5:23 |
| 8. | "Bottom Line" (performed by Martin Solveig) | 4:05 |
| 9. | "Give It to Me" (performed by Martin Solveig) | 5:12 |
| 10. | "Superficial" (featuring Lee Fields) | 4:00 |
| 11. | "Some Other Time" (featuring Jay Sebag) | 5:04 |
| Total length: | | 46:05 |

=== Definitive Edition ===
Disc one
| No. | Title | Length |
|---|---|---|
| 1. | "Boys & Girls" (featuring Dragonette) | 3:44 |
| 2. | "C'est la Vie" (featuring Jay Sebag) | 3:23 |
| 3. | "I Want You" (featuring Lee Fields) | 4:25 |
| 4. | "Butterfly" (featuring Stephy Haïk) | 5:04 |
| 5. | "Beauty False" (performed by Martin Solveig) | 4:10 |
| 6. | "Poptimistic" (words by Gail Cochrane) | 1:19 |
| 7. | "One 2.3 Four" (featuring Chakib Chambi) | 4:00 |
| 8. | "Touch Me" (featuring Stephy Haik) | 5:23 |
| 9. | "Bottom Line" (performed by Martin Solveig) | 4:05 |
| 10. | "Give It to Me" (performed by Martin Solveig) | 5:12 |
| 11. | "Superficial" (featuring Lee Fields) | 4:00 |
| 12. | "Some Other Time" (featuring Jay Sebag) | 5:04 |

Disc two
| No. | Title | Length |
|---|---|---|
| 1. | "Intro" |
| 2. | "One 2.3 Four" (Deepside Deejays remix) |
| 3. | "One 2.3 Four" (Popof remix) |
| 4. | "Boys & Girls" (Les Petits Pilous remix) |
| 5. | "C'est la Vie" (Fedde vs. Martin club mix) |
| 6. | "C'est la Vie" (The Bloody Beetroots remix) |
| 7. | "I Want You" (Mowgli & Tepr remix) |
| 8. | "I Want You" (Laidback Luke instrumental) |
| 9. | "Boys & Girls" (Bart B More "Dans Tes Rave" remix) |
| 10. | "Poptimistic" (Bingo Players vox) |
| 11. | "Give It to Me" (Kolombo & Compuphonic mix – MS edit) |
| 12. | "Give It to Me" (Tiger Stripes remix) |
| 13. | "One 2.3 Four" (Mason's dark disco mix) |
| 14. | "Touch Me" (John Paradox running dub) |
| 15. | "Touch Me" (Mark Mendes remix) |
| 16. | "One 2.3 four" (Felix Da Housecat's ATL Sia rude retro mix) |

== Personnel ==
- Martin Solveig – lead vocals, backing vocals, instruments, mixing, production, programming
- Cyril Atef – drums
- Chakib Chambi – lead vocals, backing vocals
- Gail Cochrane – spoken words
- Tom Coyne – mastering
- Sophie Delila – guitar
- Lee Fields – lead vocals
- Pascal Garnon – engineer
- Jean-Baptiste Gaudray – guitar
- Quentin Ghomari – trumpet
- Stephy Haïk – lead vocals, backing vocals
- Armelle Kergall – front and back cover photography
- Antoine Le Grand – booklet back photography
- Léo & Mona – artwork
- Laurent Meyer – saxophone
- Guy N'Sangué – bass guitar
- Jay Sebag – lead vocals, backing vocals
- Loïc Seron – trombone
- David Shama – inside photography
- Michael Tordjman – instruments, production, programming
- Philippe Weiss – mixing

- Mixed at Studio Davout, Paris
  - "C'est la vie" and "Poptimistic" mixed at Mixture Studio, France
- Mastered at Sterling Sound, New York City

== Charts ==
=== Weekly charts ===
| Chart (2008) | Peak position |
|---|---|
| Belgian Albums (Ultratop Flanders) | 99 |
| Belgian Albums (Ultratop Wallonia) | 23 |
| French Albums (SNEP) | 16 |
| Swiss Albums (Schweizer Hitparade) | 59 |

=== Year-end charts ===
| Chart (2008) | Position |
|---|---|
| French Albums (SNEP) | 182 |
