= Hedonist (album) =

Studio album by Martin Solveig
- Released: 2 June 2005
- Recorded: 2004
- Genre: Electronic, deep house, tribal house
- Length: 47:31
- Label: Mixture Stereophonic
- Producer: Martin Solveig

Martin Solveig chronology
| Sur la Terre (2002) | Hedonist (2005) | C'est la Vie (2008) |

Hedonist is the second studio album by French DJ and producer Martin Solveig, released on 2 June 2005.

== Track listing ==
Adapted from iTunes. All songs written, composed and produced by Martin Solveig

| No. | Title | Length |
|---|---|---|
| 1. | "Everybody" | 4:19 |
| 2. | "Something Better" | 4:46 |
| 3. | "If You Tell Me More" | 3:26 |
| 4. | "Black Voices" | 4:04 |
| 5. | "Rejection" | 4:44 |
| 6. | "Blind Rendez-Vous" | 0:30 |
| 7. | "Dry" | 4:58 |
| 8. | "Something About You" | 4:05 |
| 9. | "Jealousy" | 5:17 |
| 10. | "Requiem pour un con" | 2:52 |
| 11. | "Don't Waste Another Day" | 4:30 |
| Total length: | | 47:31 |

== Charts ==
| Chart (2005) | Peak position |
|---|---|
| Belgian Albums (Ultratop Wallonia) | 99 |
| French Albums (SNEP) | 43 |
