= Martin Solveig =

French DJ, singer, songwriter and record producer

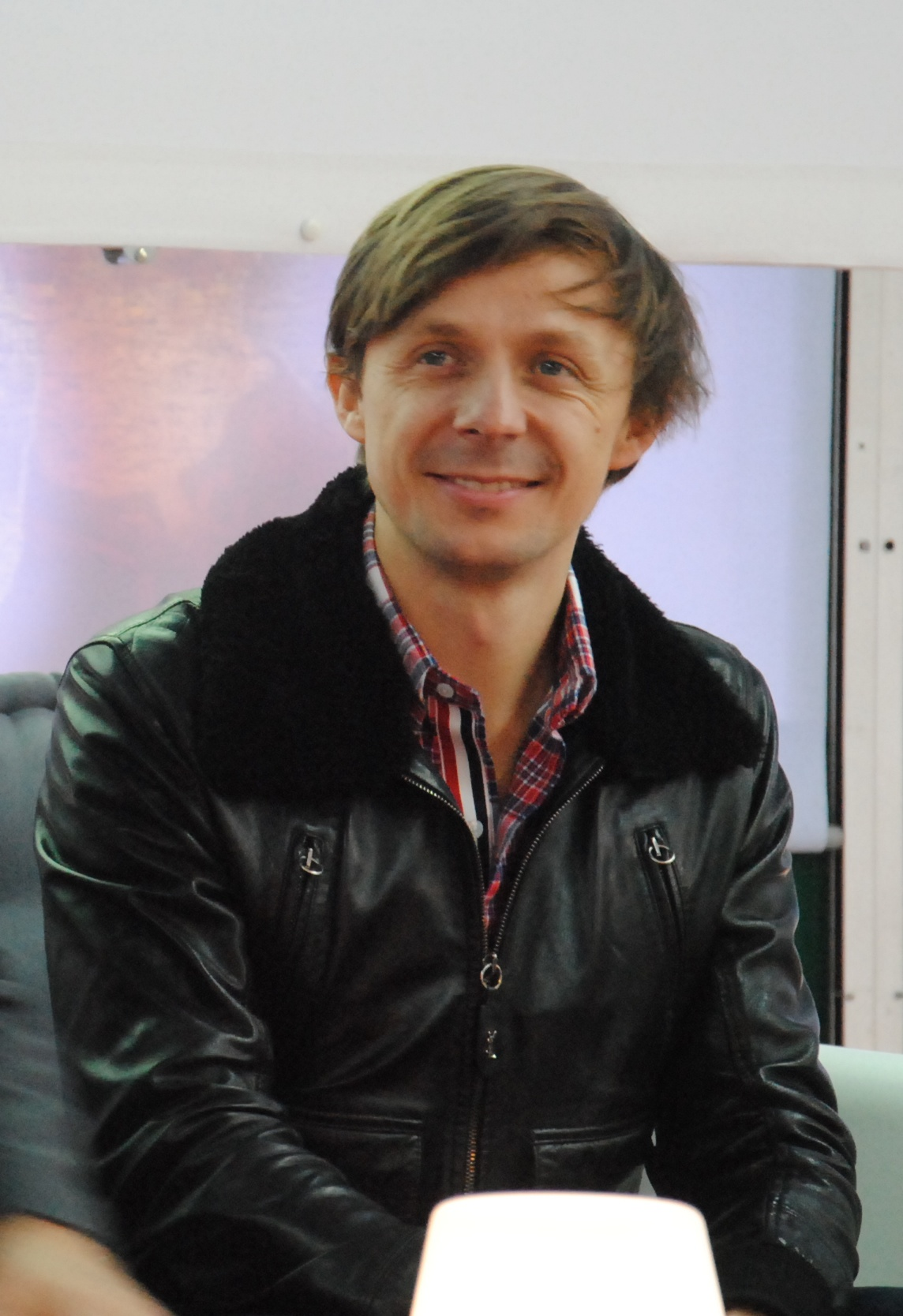
- Solveig at Futuroscope in 2012

Background information
- Born: Martin Laurent Picandet; 22 September 1976 (age 50); Paris, France
- Origin: Neuilly-sur-Seine, France
- Genres: House; future house; electro house; EDM
- Occupations: DJ; singer; songwriter; record producer
- Instruments: Turntables; synthesizer; vocals
- Years active: 1994–present
- Labels: Mixture Stereophonic; Ministry of Sound; Big Beat; Mercury; Spinnin'
- Member of: Europa
- Website: www.martinsolveig.com

Martin Laurent Picandet (French pronunciation: [maʁtɛ̃ lɔʁɑ̃ pikɑ̃de]; born 22 September 1976), better known by his stage name Martin Solveig (French: [maʁtɛ̃ sɔlvɛɡ]), is a French DJ, singer, songwriter and record producer. He hosts a weekly radio show called C'est La Vie on radio stations worldwide, including Radio FG in his homeland.

He has been active since 1994. Solveig manages his own label called Mixture Stereophonic and was ranked number 29 in the 2011 DJ Mag Top 100 DJs. He has collaborated with, among others, Ina Wroldsen, David Guetta, Jax Jones (together under the alias Europa), Laidback Luke, Dragonette, Kele of Bloc Party and Madonna.

== Early life ==
Solveig was born in Paris. As a child, he joined the choir of The Paris Boys Choir also known in France as Les petits chanteurs de Sainte-Croix de Neuilly, where he had a classical music training and became soprano soloist under the direction of François Polgár. At the age of 18, he became a DJ and then started to work in famous Parisian nightclubs: L'Enfer, Le Queen and Les Bains-Douches.

== Career ==
=== 2002–2007: Sur la Terre and Hedonist ===
On 17 June 2002, Solveig released his debut studio album Sur la Terre; the album failed to chart. The album includes the singles "Madan", "Rocking Music" and "I'm a Good Man". On 12 September 2005, he released his second studio album Hedonist; this peaked at number 43 on the French Albums Chart. The album includes the singles "Everybody", "Jealousy", "Something Better" and "Rejection".

=== 2008–2009: C'est la Vie ===
On 2 June 2008, Solveig released his third studio album C'est la Vie. The album peaked at number 16 on the French Albums Chart. "C'est la Vie" was released as the lead single from the album on 21 January 2008. "I Want You" was released as the second single from the album on 15 September 2008. "One 2.3 Four" was released as the third single from the album on 22 December 2008. "Boys & Girls" was released as the fourth single from the album on 28 September 2009.

=== 2010–2012: Smash ===
On 6 September 2010, he released the single "Hello" with Dragonette as the lead single from his fifth studio album. It is Solveig's most successful single to date, peaking at number one in Austria, Belgium (Flanders), Czech Republic and the Netherlands, while charting within the top 10 in ten other countries. The song also peaked at number 13 on the UK Singles Chart. "Ready 2 Go" was released as the second single from the album on 28 March 2011. He released his fifth studio album Smash on 6 June 2011, peaking at number 18 on the French Albums Chart. In 2011, Solveig was officially named as one of the producers for Madonna's new studio album, MDNA. On 24 October 2011, "Big in Japan" was released as the third single from the album. On 2 April 2012, "The Night Out" was released as the fourth single from the album. Solveig was also made the in house DJ for the 2012 MTV Movie Awards where he paid homage to the classic themes from movies such as Pulp Fiction.

=== 2013–present ===
On 28 May 2013, Solveig released the single "Hey Now" with The Cataracs featuring vocals from Kyle, peaking at number 55 on the French Singles Chart. The song has also charted in Belgium, Germany and Ireland. On 6 January 2014, he released the single "Blow" with Laidback Luke. The song charted in Belgium. On 23 February 2015, he released the single "Intoxicated" with Good Times Ahead (GTA). The song peaked at number 15 on the French Singles Chart. On 6 July 2015, he released the single "+1" featuring vocals from Sam White. In 2016, Solveig released the single "Do It Right" with Australian singer Tkay Maidza. In 2017, while leaving Spinnin', Solveig released the single "All Stars" with Finnish singer Alma.

In 2018, Solveig presented the inaugural Women's Ballon d'Or to Ada Hegerberg, and controversially asked her, “Do you know how to twerk?”, leading to huge public backlash and Solveig's apology for the remark.

On 19 July 2025, Solveig announced his retirement from live DJing during a performance at the Les Vieilles Charrues festival in France. While stepping away from the stage, he clarified via social media that he would continue to produce music and collaborate with other artists.

== DJ Mag ==
- 2007: No. 72 (New Entry)
- 2008: No. 52 (Up 20)
- 2009: No. 47 (Up 5)
- 2010: No. 55 (Down 8)
- 2011: No. 29 (Up 26)
- 2012: No. 48 (Down 19)
- 2013: No. 77 (Down 29)
- 2014–2015: Unlisted
- 2016: No. 98
- Since 2017: Unlisted

== Discography ==
=== Studio albums ===
- Sur la terre (2002)
- Hedonist (2005)
- C'est la Vie (2008)
- Smash (2011)
- Back to Life (2023)
