= Compo Simmonite =

Fictional character from Last of the Summer Wine

- Last of the Summer Wine character
- First appearance: "Of Funerals and Fish" (Comedy Playhouse); 4 January 1973
- Last appearance: "Magic and the Morris Minor"; 16 April 2000
- Created by: Roy Clarke
- Portrayed by: Bill Owen (Last of the Summer Wine); Paul Wyett (First of the Summer Wine)

In-universe information
- Full name: William Simmonite
- Nickname: Compo
- Occupation: Unemployed
- Spouse: Mrs Simmonite (separated)
- Children: Tom Simmonite
- Relatives: List: Dudley Simmonite (brother); Phyllis Simmonite (sister); Barry Simmonite (brother); Les Simmonite (brother); Harold Simmonite (brother); Hilda Simmonite (sister); Walter Simmonite (brother); Wendy Simmonite (sister); Ernie Simmonite (brother); Ethel Simmonite (sister); Peggy Simmonite (brother); Ada Simmonite (sister); Lionel Simmonite (brother); Nellie Simmonite (sister); Ruby Simmonite (aunt); Beth Simmonite (aunt); Connie Simmonite (aunt); Lizzie Simmonite (aunt); Gladys Simmonite (aunt); Wilfred Simmonite (uncle); Dudley Simmonite (uncle); Percy Simmonite (uncle); Ned Simmonite (uncle); Big Malcolm Simmonite (cousin); Chip Simmonite (nephew); Connie Simmonite (niece-in-law); Gordon Simmonite (nephew); Julie Simmonite (niece) Annie Simmonite (cousin); Arnold Simmonite (cousin); Vince Simmonite (cousin); Eric Simmonite; Sean Simmonite (great-nephew); Julian Simmonote (great-nephew); 2 unnamed grandchildren
- Home: 28 Huddersfield Road, Holmfirth

William Simmonite, better known by his nickname of Compo (from unemployment compensation, as in the phrase "he's on the compo", according to series writer Roy Clarke), was a character in the world's longest-running sitcom, Last of the Summer Wine.

== Fictional character biography ==
=== Early life ===
Compo was born in 1919 into a poor, lower-class family in Holmfirth. He claims that his mother, a rag-and-bone woman, said that, immediately after he was born, the sun began to shine and that a swallow began to sing. Mentions of his father suggest Compo was born illegitimate from a brief liaison; Foggy stated of Compo's father that "he was away before you got a good look at him... in fact, he was away before your mother got a good look at him". Having once rigged Compo up to look like a kamikaze pilot, and impressed with the likeness, Clegg jokingly suggests Compo's father to have been Japanese, to which Compo replies "Japanese? With a name like Withenshaw?" indicating this to have been his father's surname and that the Simmonites are his mother's side of the family. He mentions that, according to his mother, his father was from Chesterfield. The Simmonite family is a large one. Compo had several encounters in his schooldays, which he remembers fondly – with the exception of one with Aggie Duckett who, he claims, "used to make his nose bleed". This was due to the fact that she was always thumping him because he laughed at her boots, not knowing they were her father's. His school friends included Norman Clegg (Peter Sallis), Cyril Blamire (Michael Bates), Walter "Foggy" Dewhurst (Brian Wilde), Seymour Utterthwaite (Michael Aldridge) and Herbert "Truly" Truelove (Frank Thornton).

=== Love life ===
Compo married soon after the war, but the marriage did not last long and he does not remember his wife, as she "ran off with a chuffin' Pole!" in 1947. He had several flings in his youth, one of which went to the next level and resulted in the birth of his son, Tom. Tom tracked his father down and wrote to him (mentioning Compo's two grandchildren, who "went off in search of truth and wisdom with bits of metal through their nose"), but he arrives in Holmfirth to meet him too late, just after his father's funeral.

Out of loneliness, Compo once hired a housekeeper (Liz Smith). He takes her out for a meal at Sid's Café and tries to start a relationship. However, she does a moonlight flit with all his newly-bought possessions. After his death, it is revealed that Compo went every Thursday to visit Regina "Reggie" Unsworth (Liz Fraser) to whom he left his ferrets.

==== Nora Batty ====
Despite never actually divorcing his wife, he has an unrequited love for his neighbour of many years, Nora Batty (Kathy Staff); they'd been neighbours since 1952. Despite constant reminders that it would never happen or, in earlier days, that she was married, Compo persisted in his attempts to elope with Nora. However, he may only like Nora because he knows it will not progress further. When Nora's downtrodden husband Wally (Joe Gladwin) announced that he was leaving her to emigrate to New Zealand, Compo immediately tried to step into Wally's place with an apparently willing Nora. Wally had told Compo privately that he was actually only going to his mother's for a few days and would be back soon. When Clegg and Blamire tricked Compo into believing that Wally was really emigrating and Nora was intent on marriage, he panicked and tried his hardest to remove Nora from the dinner to which he had invited her.

Although Nora often gives Compo the hard end of her broomstick, she does often display concern or kindness towards him. When he cleans himself up during Wally's escape, she dresses up for a meal with him; when he disappears off a cliff on one of Foggy's wild schemes, she shows concern; when he is caught in one of Wesley Pegden's (Gordon Wharmby) exploding vehicles, she rushes forwards and tries to comfort him with a showing of her leg.

Nora feels guilty when Compo dies in hospital with a smile on his face after suffering a heart attack when seeing her in unwrinkled stockings. She and Ivy sit up for the rest of the night, reminiscing about his various exploits. When Nora and Ivy go to visit Compo before his funeral in the Chapel of Rest, Nora is horrified that he still has the smile on his face, much to Ivy's amusement.

Bill Owen said in an interview that Compo sees Nora as the Elizabeth Taylor of Holmfirth.

==== Ivy ====
Although his main aim in life was Nora, he also played his luck with the formidable owner of Sid's Café, Ivy (Jane Freeman). Although Ivy rejected his advances, her lumbering, coarse husband Sid (John Comer) does not try to stop him as he knows Compo does not mean anything by it. Whenever he tries to make advances to Ivy, the result is that he and his companions are thrown out of the café or hit on the head with Ivy's metal tray. Said Compo in one episode, "I'm just goin' to get me 'ead bashed with a tray."

Ivy sometimes appreciates Compo's advances and, when he is not in the room, smiles superiorly. In the early episodes, when it seemed like Compo and the other two members of the trio were not getting hospitality or being welcomed in the Cafe, they would break out into a rendition of "We'll Keep a Welcome" much to Ivy's chagrin.

=== Later years ===
"The joy of Bill Owen's Compo is not what he does with the words but where he takes the character beyond what's in the script. He did this in a physical manner. It was only when I saw Bill on screen that I realized what a wonderful physical clown he was."

— Roy Clarke on Bill Owen and Compo

In his later life, Compo, Norman and a third man (such as Cyril or Foggy) roamed the hills around Holmfirth, getting involved with harebrained schemes to keep themselves one step ahead of boredom. Compo often talks of his vast, vast family and their exploits. He seems closest to Norman, as it is the third man who uses Compo as a guinea pig for their schemes. On one occasion Compo was repeatedly thrown backwards in the hope of getting a lift up a hill. Throughout the series, Compo always loved an argument with the third man; Cyril Blamire was perhaps the person he argued with the most. This was largely because Cyril viewed himself as superior to Compo (and occasionally Clegg) and made snide remarks about Compo's working class lifestyle more frequently than his successors. His right-wing political views contrasted to Compo's left wing views. (In real life Bill Owen's and Michael Bates's political views were similar to their onscreen characters and, in turn, both conflicted.) Despite this, Compo and Cyril were still close and Compo was very miserable about his departure.

During Foggy's first stint, Compo frequently argued with him in a similar manner. This was largely due to Foggy's military background and, like the previous third man, Foggy often made insults of disgust over Compo's attire. He frequently referred to him as "that man". As a part of his schemes, Foggy also made Compo volunteer for often dangerous and ridiculous situations and, as a result, he was regularly harmed (though rarely injured) or humiliated. Foggy also commented on Compo not serving in World War 2. (In reality Bill Owen served in the Royal Army Ordnance Corps and was injured in an explosion during a training exercise).

During Seymour's brief stint in the late 1980s, Compo was often made to test the former's inventions which frequently ended up in disaster for him and he called Seymour a twit whenever things went wrong. Despite this, Seymour was more willing to play along with Compo's childish antics than his predecessors were.

When Seymour departed the show, Foggy returned at the beginning of the 1990s. During this time, Foggy was shown to have mellowed somewhat and as a result became more tolerant of Compo (though not always). It was during this period when perhaps Compo's most famous misfortune happened, in the series 15 episode "Stop That Bath". The trio were helping Howard transport a cast iron bath for Marina, by wheeling it on a cart through the streets. While trying to push the bath up a steep hill, Compo lost his balance and fell into the bath, causing the others to lose their grip on the cart which started speeding down the hill with Compo in the bath. The bath fell off the cart and crashed into a loose drain pipe, which soaked Compo.

During Truly's stint on the show, Compo was similarly often involved in dangerous situations against his will. Though Truly was pompous like his predecessors, he eventually grew used to Compo's childish behaviour and the two did not argue frequently.

Throughout Compo's time on the show, there were numerous references to Compo's vast family and their (implied) criminal tendencies. Although several relatives appeared in the show, this does not come close to the number of relatives mentioned lightly in conversation. By the time Compo’s son Tom appeared in the series, it is said all of Compo’s family have died.

=== Death ===
Bill Owen died of pancreatic cancer in 1999 and, the following year, the character of Compo was killed off following the broadcast of three episodes that Owen had already filmed.

According to Truly and Clegg, Compo died from a heart attack after catching the sight of Nora Batty in chorus girl clothes. However, he died with a smile on his face (as confirmed by Truly, Clegg and Nora).

He was buried alongside his signature Wellington boots. Clegg is disappointed at not being able to say goodbye personally, so Truly (Frank Thornton) arranges for an abundance of white painter's overalls to be laid out in a formation saying 'See Ya, Compo' on the opposite hill. All the other main characters – Wesley, Edie (Dame Thora Hird), Glenda (Sarah Thomas), Barry (Mike Grady), Howard (Robert Fyfe), Pearl (Juliette Kaplan), Marina (Jean Fergusson), Nora and Ivy — go to view it, in their different transport modes.

== Money ==
Compo was always broke. He spent most of his life (presumably until he reached retirement age) in the unemployment queues, as the prospect of a job sent his skin white. He always relied on Clegg and whoever was completing the trio to supply him with cigarettes, ale and other such things. His lack of funds always surprises his friends, to the point when Compo is willing to get injured as it will end up with someone, usually Foggy, buying him a drink out of guilt or remorse. Although he married soon after the war, almost thirty years later he is still in an argument with the thirty-bob tailor who made his wedding suit. He cannot pay his television rental; the shop takes it back so frequently that he leaves his door unlocked so they can take it whenever necessary. In one episode, Foggy states that Compo owes him money and, in the episode in which Compo was buried, Truly remarks that he still owed him two quid and questioned Clegg if the money was in the letter he sent to him.
