= Nora Batty =

Fictional character from Last of the Summer Wine

- Last of the Summer Wine character
- First appearance: "Of Funerals and Fish" (Comedy Playhouse); 4 January 1973
- Last appearance: "Get Out of That, Then"; 31 August 2008
- Created by: Roy Clarke
- Portrayed by: Kathy Staff (Last of the Summer Wine); Helen Patrick (First of the Summer Wine)

In-universe information
- Full name: Nora Batty, née Renshaw
- Occupation: Housewife
- Family: Billy Renshaw (brother); Madge Renshaw (sister); Clara Renshaw (sister); Stella (sister)
- Spouses: Wally Batty
- Relatives: Barry (cousin); Dudley (cousin); Susan (cousin); Nelly (cousin)

Nora Batty (née Renshaw) is a fictional character in the world's longest-running sitcom, Last of the Summer Wine. Nora became a national icon, recognised by her wrinkled stockings, pinny and distinctive style of hair curlers. She appeared in 243 of the 295 episodes.

In the pilot episode, "Of Funerals and Fish", Compo Simmonite refers to her as "Eunice", while her husband (later Wally) is "Harold".

== Fictional character biography ==
=== Early life ===
Nora was one of five siblings: Madge, who emigrated to Australia; Billy, who also emigrated but spent all his time dying; Clara, who only comes for Christmas; and Stella (Barbara Young), who came to housesit for Nora when she went to care for Madge in Australia. Nora did work during World War II at an ammunition factory.

She married Wally Batty (Joe Gladwin), a railway engineer, in World War II (45 episodes 1975-87).

=== Later years ===
Wally and Nora never had any children; Nora wore the trousers and frequently man-handled her husband, turning him shell-shocked very early on. The two managed to live together, but Wally did run away to stay with his mother once in 1972. Nora was a strict person on the exterior, but if you chipped further down she was a caring person who had her sensitive spots. She was a member of the ladies tea circle, which included Ivy (Jane Freeman), Pearl (Juliette Kaplan), Edie (Dame Thora Hird) and the more naïve Glenda (Sarah Thomas).

==== Compo Simmonite ====
One of the perpetual annoyances in Nora's life was her neighbour of many years, Compo Simmonite (Bill Owen). Compo admired Nora from afar, and, much to her annoyance, was a great friend of Wally's. When Compo pointed out Nora's famous wrinkled stockings, forced himself on her or surprised her, she would either drag Wally out in a failed attempt to put him off or assault him with the harder end of her broomstick. However, Nora does care for Compo deep down; when he doesn't notice her, she thinks something is up.

Although initially a stern Northern "battleaxe", Nora showed on occasion, particularly as the years passed, that underneath she is actually a rather caring and kind woman — although she doesn't openly promote the fact. She even seemed to grow fond of Compo - in the 1996 Christmas special "Extra! Extra!", she was bowled over at the sight of him in military uniform. She also seemed very flattered when Compo sang about his feelings for her at a concert in the previous year's Christmas special. In the few instances where Compo didn't make a remark about her wrinkled stockings she showed concern, believing that something was wrong with him. Clegg (Peter Sallis) once remarked that Nora is at the top of her field with the possible exception of Ivy. Nora didn't take to the statement too kindly because she said that if it came to a "slanging match" she would soon sort Ivy out as, according to Nora, Ivy has too much flesh on her to be really mean. Nora also views Clegg and Foggy (Brian Wilde) with a mix of sharp tongue, exasperation, and general dismissal.

In an interview Kathy Staff revealed that there was some sort of affection that Nora felt towards Compo that she would not admit to herself let alone him. When Bill Owen died in July 1999, Staff initially announced her plans to leave the series, feeling that it would not be the same without him. With the introduction of Compo's son Tom (played by his real life son Tom Owen), however, she was persuaded to stay. Staff actually left the series in 2001, to reprise her role as cleaner Doris Luke in the revival of the ITV soap opera Crossroads, with Nora said to be emigrating to Australia.

When Crossroads was cancelled, Staff returned to the role, but no reference was made to Nora's trip to Australia or her sudden return. She continued to play the character until shortly before her death in December 2008. With Staff unable to appear in Series 30 because of ill health, Nora again left for Australia, this time to care for her elder sister, Madge. A previously unknown sister, Stella, moved into her home to look after it during her absence.
