= List of Last of the Summer Wine characters =

The following is a list of characters in the British television sitcom Last of the Summer Wine. The main series focused primarily on a trio of old men and their interaction with other characters in the town. Due to the longevity of the series, it was often necessary to replace key characters due to an actor's death, illness, or unavailability for other reasons. Many characters were first seen in "one-off" appearances, and were popular enough or felt to have enough potential for them to be brought back as regulars, in some instances replacing previous members of the cast. Some characters also featured in the prequel series, as well as several shorts.

== Summer Wine trio ==
Series and year
1; 2	3; 4; 5; 6; 7; 8	9; 10; 11; 12	13; 14; 15; 16; 17; 18	19; 20; 21	22; 23; 24; 25; 26; 27	28; 29	30; 31
1973	1976	1986	1990	1998	2001	2007	2009
Blamire (Michael; Bates)	Foggy (Brian Wilde)	Seymour (Michael; Aldridge)	Foggy	Truly (Frank Thornton)			Hobbo (Russ; Abbott)
Compo (Bill Owen)					Billy (Keith Clifford)	Alvin (Brian Murphy)	
Clegg (Peter Sallis)							Entwistle (Burt; Kwouk)
Timeline of trios of principal characters. Truly and Clegg continued as secondary characters until the end of the show. Billy first appeared in series 20, and Alvin and Entwistle both in series 24. In the second half of series 21, Tom Simmonite was temporarily in the trio after the death of Compo.

=== Cyril Blamire ===
(Michael Bates; 1973–1975) The first "third man", and the most childishly argumentative and snobbish, Blamire was the contrast to Compo. Blamire was fired up by displays of youthful enthusiasm, energetic gusto, or any sign of the British spirit. He served as a corporal in the British Army in the Royal Signals regiment during "The Great Fight for Freedom" as a "supply wallah" (a storeman) in India and retains his military bearing. Michael Bates was born in India and from 1942 served as a Major with the 9th Gurkha Rifles in the Burma campaign (1941-1945).

He was a Tory and a self-important know-it-all with upper-class aspirations, who often dissociated himself from the other two, especially Compo, as he considered himself superior to them. Because of his sophisticated interests and insistence on table manners, Compo liked to refer to him as a "poof" (in turn, Cyril would often use insults such as "grotty little herbert" to Compo). Cyril would often reprimand Compo whenever he addressed him by his given name, as he preferred the "more rounded tone of Mr Blamire" and would say that Compo had to touch his "tatty cap" whenever he did so.

Out of all of the third men, Blamire tolerated Compo's antics the least (though sometimes when he got caught up in them he would join in, such as backchatting Miss Probert on one occasion) and treated him the worst, such as occasionally telling Compo he should kill himself by "read[ing] the tailgate of a reversing lorry". In spite of this, Compo and Blamire were close, as shown by Compo's misery in the episodes immediately after he left. Despite his snobby nature, Blamire had more common sense than most of his successors. Bates left the cast in 1975 due to cancer and concentrated on his role in It Ain't Half Hot Mum. Blamire was written out of the series; it was said that he had left the moment he heard that an old flame had recently been widowed. The last the audience hears of him is a very organised letter, instructing Clegg and Compo to meet their old classmate, Foggy Dewhurst. After Foggy's first episode, Cyril is mentioned once in season five's "Deep in the Heart of Yorkshire". Cyril Blamire is one of the few characters established in this series (along with Sid) who does not appear in First of the Summer Wine.

=== William "Compo" Simmonite ===
(Bill Owen; 1973–2000)

=== Norman Clegg ===
(Peter Sallis; 1973–2010)

=== Walter C. "Foggy" Dewhurst ===
(Brian Wilde; 1976–1985, 1990–1997, Colin Harris; 1997) Walter C. "Foggy" Dewhurst was the second ‘Third Man', a former soldier who liked to boast of his military exploits in Burma during the Second World War. In fact, he had been a signwriter; and unlike Blamire, many of his old military stories were untrue.

Although he considered himself very regimental and heroic, when confronted Foggy was generally meek and incompetent, even a coward. Like the previous third man – and all subsequent third men – he considered himself the leader of the trio, and frequently took charge of Compo and Clegg. Foggy was infamous for trying to figure out a solution to the trio's everyday problems, only to make them much worse. In earlier years, Foggy wore a scarf with regimental colours on it. When Wilde left the series in 1985 to star in his own sitcom and to pursue other TV work, it was explained that Foggy had moved to Bridlington to take over his family's egg-painting business.

Returning in 1990 after the sudden departure of Michael Aldridge, he claimed he had tired of egg painting, and wanted to return to his old life. A regular skit from this period included Foggy crossing paths with a stranger and then rambling about his supposed military career, typically boring each stranger to death. At other times, he would try to recreate scenarios from his military days, which also confused and bored passing strangers. He would often explain that he was a trained killer, which would inevitably lead to him getting into trouble and on the odd occasion being arrested (stupidly, he could never understand why people always found this explanation strange). During his second stint, Foggy was shown to have mellowed somewhat and he did not argue with Compo as much as he had done previously. In 1997, when Wilde's illness stopped him taking part, he was written out of the series in the Special, "There Goes the Groom", in which the character was only seen in brief, non-face shots, played by a double (performed by regular art department crew member Colin Harris). This episode also introduced his successor, Truly. When episodes are repeated, feature-length episodes, including this one, are omitted, so viewers new to the series may be confused by Foggy's sudden disappearance.

An unconscious, hung-over Foggy was swept off to Blackpool by the local postmistress. There he inadvertently proposed to her in a verbal slip-up over the wedding rings of which he had taken charge "for safe keeping" (out of the dubious care of Best Man, Barry). But he must have at least liked her, as he was never heard from again after that. Foggy's real first name was revealed to be Walter (with the middle initial "C"); "Foggy" is a nickname, derived from the traditional song "The Foggy Foggy Dew"; perhaps also because, in his earlier episodes, he would occasionally "blank out" everything around him to help him concentrate, particularly when he was thinking up new ideas or finding solutions to problems. This is particularly noticeable in the episode "The Man from Oswestry". In one of his earlier episodes, his name is hinted to be Oliver when Clegg finds one of his old army trunks with the initials 'COD' (because he was a corporal in the army). Due to his dislike of Compo's attire and nature, he was often seen making insults of disgust to Clegg and often addressed Compo as "him" or "that man".

In First of the Summer Wine episode "Not Thee Missus", the young Foggy is called Graham by his mother. In this series, he is played by Richard Lumsden.

=== Seymour Utterthwaite ===
(Michael Aldridge; 1986–1990) The third 'third man'. A snobbish inventor and ex-school headmaster, Edie and Ros's brother Seymour always felt it was his duty to educate the masses, and in particular, Compo and Clegg, to whom he was reintroduced by his brother-in-law, Wesley Pegden (who often called him a pillock), shortly before the wedding of Wesley's daughter. Seymour went to school with Clegg and Compo but lost touch when he went to grammar school. (In Series 10, episode 5, "Downhill Racer", Nora Batty undermines Edie's bragging about Seymour's intellect by pointing out that their grandmother was on the Education Committee.) Whereas Cyril and Foggy tried to solve the problems of the residents of Holmfirth, when Seymour was around he always liked to invent, but the resulting inventions invariably led to disaster – especially for Compo, who was always the reluctant test subject and called him a twit whenever anything went disastrously wrong. Despite this, he was well-liked by the other two and was more willing to play along with their childish antics than his predecessors. He did have occasional bouts of bravery: in series 9, episode 6 ("The Ice-Cream Man Cometh") he contradicted Pearl, Ivy and Nora Batty in one sitting for which Clegg, Compo and a random passer-by heartily congratulated him.

Seymour usually blamed the failure of his inventions on divine punishment for his once having had an affair with a barmaid. Seymour's house, outside the town, was modified into a laboratory, filled with new devices and contraptions that seldom, if ever, worked properly. His sister Edie always spoke very highly of him and how he was 'educated', refusing to take into account his continual failed inventions (though she would secretly be embarrassed by his involvement in the antics of the other two). Because Seymour's inventions were always built poorly he would normally get Wesley to fix them (or he would just get Wesley to build them in the first place, much to the latter's annoyance). Seymour had previously been the headmaster of a school, although it is not entirely clear how successful he was in running it. When Compo and Clegg were in his home Seymour would often put on his old headmaster's gown and treat the two of them like schoolchildren when trying to explain a new invention. This included making them sit on small wooden chairs once typical of infant schools. He sometimes appeared to take an unhealthy delight in corporal punishment, and was appalled to hear that it has been prohibited.

Miriam Utterthwaite is Seymour's ex-wife who left him. Her final message to Seymour was "your oven is in the tea" as a reference to his failed inventions. She is mentioned on many occasions during Seymour's time on the show.

While Aldridge played Seymour, actor Paul McLain played the younger version of the same character in First of the Summer Wine. When Aldridge left the series in 1990 for personal reasons, Seymour was last seen leaving on a bus to take up a new job as interim headmaster at a private school—just as Foggy returned.

There were allegedly plans for Seymour to make a comeback, but Michael Aldridge died in 1994. The character was never alluded to again. A photo of Seymour can be seen on Glenda's fireplace in the late 1990s, but it had disappeared by the early 2000s.

=== Herbert "Truly" Truelove ===
(Frank Thornton; 1997–2010) The fourth ‘third man', Herbert Truelove, known as Truly, was a retired policeman. He was initially played with a pompous self-importance in all things criminal. However, this aspect of the character was fairly quickly softened, and Truly became more relaxed and fun-loving, and can be more of an equal match at the local pub than his predecessors as third man. He can also be a bit more devious with practical jokes or witty schemes. Likewise, he can be equally sly in getting people out of a scrape or just helping out a friend. He is divorced, and makes disparaging comments about "the former Mrs Truelove" (who evidently feels the same way about him, judging by the reaction of her new husband, who appears in one episode, to Truly). The former Mrs Truelove, whose real name is Mabel, is an unseen character.

Because of his previous job in the police, he refers to himself as "Truly of the Yard". (He is also once misheard and thought to have said he was "Trudy of the Yard".) As he is less snobbish and pompous, like his predecessors (sometimes taking out his police notebook in unnecessary situations), he gradually became more likeable and made fewer snide remarks over Compo's attire. He also appeared to be more respected than his predecessors by the other regular characters such as Wesley and Howard, as well as the local ladies. In the two final series, he is demoted to a secondary character along with Norman Clegg, so his role as third man was filled by Hobbo.

=== Tom Simmonite ===
(Tom Owen; 2000–2010) Compo's long-lost son, arriving just after his father's death, Tom is played by Bill Owen's real-life son. Tom is a layabout like Compo, but seems a bit more enterprising in his attempts to maintain his slothful lifestyle. Originally it was planned that Tom would fill the gap in the three-man line-up left by his father, but it was soon felt that this line-up did not quite work. For most of his time in the series, he was paired with Smiler working for Auntie Wainwright, and also, in one episode, goes to live with Smiler (though it is not clear if this continued). Of the duo, he designates himself the 'leader' and the planner (often leaving Smiler to struggle with Auntie Wainwright's antiquated hand-cart while he strolls on ahead), although in truth, he is not particularly bright himself. After Smiler was written out of the series, Tom continued to work for Auntie Wainwright until the conclusion of the show's run. Clegg and Truly often take advantage of his desire to live up to his father's reputation in order to convince him to do rather stupid things. After the death of Compo, Nora feels somewhat maternal towards Tom, and often showers him with affection—much to the embarrassment of Tom. He also has a scruffy puppet dog called Waldo which he aspires to use in an unconvincing ventriloquist act. When not working for Auntie Wainwright, Tom can usually be found in his allotment shed, avoiding the repo man (he rarely, if ever, used his allotment to grow vegetables). When he first arrives in the series, Tom also has a tatty old yellow Renault van, but this is seen in only a couple of his early appearances.

For some years before joining the series as Tom Simmonite, Tom Owen sometimes appeared in uncredited walk-on parts on the show. He was only credited as "bank customer" in the 1991 Christmas special "Situations Vacant".

=== Billy Hardcastle ===
(Keith Clifford; 1999–2006) Billy Hardcastle was first introduced (as a guest star) in the 20th series in 1999. He also appeared in the 2000 New Year's special and made one more appearance in the 21st series before becoming a regular character in the 22nd series due to popularity.

Billy believes he is a direct descendant of Robin Hood. His first appearance on the show showed him attempting to recruit a band of Merry Men to go with him while he robs from the rich to give to the poor. At the end of the 21st series, Billy moves next door to Truly and is teamed as the third member of the trio. When Billy joined with Clegg and Truly, much of the humour Compo previously brought to the series returned in Billy's childlike demeanour, although an element of physical humour was still lacking in the series. On his first appearance, Nora was shown to be attracted to him dressed in his Robin Hood costume, which made Compo extremely jealous and decided to dress up as Robin Hood himself. Much of his dialogue bemoaned the domestic presence of "the wife" or "the wife's sister" (two other characters who are never seen, only referred to). Mrs Hardcastle and her sister were the misery causes in Billy's life. He often remarked about their horrible nature towards him. Apparently they share a bed and Billy gets the spare room. In one episode they can both be heard laughing and speaking. Billy was last seen at the end of the 27th series following the departure of Keith Clifford from the show and the character was never alluded to again.

=== Alvin Smedley ===
(Brian Murphy; 2003–2010) Alvin Smedley was introduced in the 24th series (aired in 2003) as Nora Batty's new next door neighbour following the death of Compo. When Tom's former acquaintance, Mrs Avery, gave up the lease she owned on Compo's old house, Alvin purchases it. Although he publicly claimed to hate Nora Batty, he felt it was his duty to try to bring some joy to her life, often in the form of practical jokes similar to those Compo once played on her. In the 26th series (aired in 2005), he joined the main trio, thus making them a quartet (largely to compensate for Clegg's decreasing role), but, following the 27th series (aired in 2006), and Billy Hardcastle's departure, the quartet once again became a trio, although in the 28th and 29th series (aired in 2007 and 2008), he was mostly teamed up with Entwistle. His arrival to the main trio brought a sense physical humour that had been missing since Compo's death. Despite his childlike personality, he was shown to be more level-headed than his predecessors. In the final two series, he and Entwistle teamed up with Hobbo, thus making a new trio.

=== Luther "Hobbo" Hobdyke ===
(Russ Abbot; 2008–2010) Luther "Hobbo" Hobdyke is a former milkman with ties to MI5. He was first introduced in the 2008 New Year special, to set up his role in the 30th series. He is Clegg's new next door neighbour. Upon first arriving in the village, Hobbo recruits Alvin and Entwistle to form a small band of volunteers who will react to any emergency that arises in the village, thus forming a new trio (with Hobbo taking Truly's role in the trio). Hobbo is incredibly cautious, and always on the lookout for enemy attack. He fondly remembers his time spent with MI5, when he used to leap from aeroplanes ("Holding crates of milk?" asks Entwistle) and dive for cover from enemy fire. The idea of Hobbo being a spy may be an allusion to the character "Basildon Bond" whom Abbot played in his 1980s television series. Throughout his time on the show Hobbo is convinced that Nelly is his mother and he frequently bothers her (or uses other people) for attention, much to her annoyance. Clegg and Truly recall that Hobbo was never much of a milkman but was exemplary at needlework. He was also one of the last two new characters to be introduced to the series with Nora Batty's sister Stella, both first appearing in the same episode.

=== Electrical Entwistle ===
(Burt Kwouk; 2002–2010) Electrician and fortune-teller from the land of eastern wisdom, Hull. His original surname was McIntyre, but he changed it so that people would not mistake him for a Scotsman. When Wesley died, Entwistle took over his job of shuttling the others across the countryside, in a battered red Toyota Hilux pick-up truck, and occasionally constructing the various contraptions the main trio produce. He also seemed to be taking over a character version of Auntie Wainwright, although he mainly sold second-hand washing machines. "Electrical Entwistle" appears to be a self-chosen nickname, seldom used by other characters, who just call him "Entwistle". His real first name is never revealed. He occasionally mentions his wife, Mrs Entwistle. In the 2006 Christmas special "A Tale of Two Sweaters" she and Mr. Entwistle had a row so later on they could make up.

Following the departure of Billy Hardcastle in series 27, Entwistle was often paired with Alvin, with many stories revolving around their dealings with Howard or Barry. During this period, his role increased and he often hung around with the main trio (sometimes to compensate for Clegg's decreasing role). In the final two series 30 and 31, Entwistle became the second man (officially taking over from Clegg) in a new trio when Hobbo arrived and recruited Alvin and Entwistle to form a band of volunteers to respond to emergencies in the village.

== Other regular characters ==
Series and year
1	2	3	4	5	6	7	8	9	10	11	12	13	14	15	16	17	18	19	20	21	22	23	24	25	26	27	28	29	30	31
73	75	76	77	79	82	83	85	86	88	89	90	91	92	93	95	95	97	98	99	00	01	02	03	04	05	06	07	08	09	10
Sid (John Comer)																														
Ivy (Jane Freeman)
Nora Batty (Kathy Staff)																														
	Wally Batty (Joe Gladwin)																													
							Wesley (Gordon Wharmby)																							
									PC Cooper											(Ken Kitson)										
							Crusher (Jonathan Linsley)																							
							Marina (Jean Fergusson)																							
							Howard (Robert Fyfe)																							
							Pearl (Juliette Kaplan)																							
								Edie (Thora Hird)																						
																Barry (Mike Grady)														
								Glenda (Sarah Thomas)																						
								Eli (Danny O'Dea)																						
												2nd Policeman								(Tony Capstick)										
											Smiler (Stephen Lewis)																			
																									PC Walsh (Louis Emerick)					
													Auntie Wainwright (Jean Alexander)																	
																				Ros (Dora Bryan)										
																				Mrs Avery (Julie T. Wallace)										
																					Morton Beemish								(Christopher Beeny)	
																							The Captain						(Trevor Bannister)	
																							Miss Davenport (Josephine Tewson)							
																									Nelly (June Whitfield)					
																													Stella (Barbara Young)	
73	75	76	77	79	82	83	85	86	88	89	90	91	92	93	95	95	97	98	99	00	01	02	03	04	05	06	07	08	09	10
1	2	3	4	5	6	7	8	9	10	11	12	13	14	15	16	17	18	19	20	21	22	23	24	25	26	27	28	29	30	31

=== Sid ===
(John Comer; 1973–1983, Tony Melody; 1983) Bluff café owner, who featured prominently for the first ten years, before Comer's death in 1984. Ivy remembers him fondly, and often mentions him in conversation. Sid was one of the few characters who actually seemed to enjoy getting involved in the misadventures of the three central characters, and often saw them as an excuse to get out of the café for a few hours. However, he was occasionally shown to be extremely irritated by some of their schemes and antics (most notably in the episode "Getting on Sidney's wire" where he gets angry with Foggy for ruining his attempts to fit a new doorbell to the café and subsequently throws him out). Like Wally Batty, he often welcomed Compo's affection for his wife. In one episode, he remarks that he "can't help admiring Compo's nerve".

Ivy and Sid often shouted and argued with each other, and Ivy was never shy about bringing up Sid's infidelity; but, as with many of the show's couples, there was little doubt that they loved each other. Throughout his time in the series, Sid and Wally were shown to be best friends and the two of them often joined each other in trying to sneak away from their wives to the pub or any other activity, often involving the main trio. Another long running gag during his time on the show were ongoing rumours of his supposed affair with a local unseen bus conductress. Ivy was aware of this and often accused him of being unfaithful. Although Sid once admitted to the trio he was friends with the conductress, he always flatly denied the rumours and, despite the odd verbal hint, very little evidence of this was ever seen onscreen.

For John Comer's last ever appearance, in the 1983 feature-length Christmas special, "Getting Sam Home", illness caused by cancer affected his speech, and so his lines were dubbed over by another actor, Tony Melody. Comer died two months later in February 1984. Sid's death was eventually referred to in the 1986 New Year's Day special "Uncle of the Bride". It was hinted after his death that Sid was a supporter of Manchester United.

After his death, Sid was often mentioned by Ivy usually during the ladies' coffee mornings. In the 2000 episode "Just a Small Funeral", as Ivy is getting ready for Compo's funeral, she finds a photo of Sid in her handbag. The café was later named Sid's Cafe.

=== Ivy ===
(Jane Freeman; 1973–2010) Joint owner of the café with husband Sid, with whom she would often have blazing rows in the kitchen, until his death. She later ran it alone. Physically formidable, she viciously scolded anyone who dared misbehave or criticise the food by throwing them out the café or often hitting them on the head with a tray. Generally the wisest and most level-headed of the show's female social circle, she was also on occasion a target of Compo's unwanted affection, who often said that if it wasn't for Nora Batty, he'd be all over her. This regularly resulted in Compo along with the others (sometimes including Sid) being thrown out or being on the receiving end of her anger in other ways. In earlier episodes, she was shown to tolerate the main trio more when they visited the café. In widowhood, she became stricter with them, although after Compo's death she became more amused by their antics. Ivy is the only character other than Clegg (Peter Sallis) to have been present throughout the course of the series, although Clegg is the only one to have appeared in every episode.

In some of the episodes, particularly earlier ones, she seemed to have a rivalry with Nora. Ivy would often criticise Nora's taste in hats, and Nora once said Ivy's pastry wasn't light enough (which succeeded in bringing Ivy to the verge of tears). It is unknown if she took Sid's surname when she married as his surname was never revealed, but Ivy's surname was said to be Bolton in First of the Summer Wine. In that prequel series, the character is played by Sarah Dangerfield.

=== Nora Batty ===
(Kathy Staff; 1973–2001, 2003–2008)

=== Wally Batty ===
(Joe Gladwin; 1975–1987) Nora's perennially shell-shocked husband and Compo's next-door neighbour, Wally Batty was a short and quiet man, kept on a short leash by his wife. His relationship with Nora stood in stark contrast to Compo's unrequited lust after her; in fact, he often welcomed the prospect of Compo running off with her. Initially mentioned but not seen, he was generally seen doing chores or stealing a quick moment away from Nora at the pub. Despite being dominated by his wife, Wally had an acerbic wit and was often quick to reply with a sharp-tongued comment when Nora told him off, though this often caused more trouble for him. Wally had a passion for racing pigeons and owned a motorbike and sidecar, occasionally taking Nora for a spin around the countryside.

When Joe Gladwin died in 1987, Wally died off-screen, but he was still occasionally mentioned. Gladwin last appeared in series 9. He died just days before the broadcast of his final appearance.

In the Comedy Playhouse pilot, the character (still unseen) was referred to as Harold. The character was played by Gary Whitaker in the prequel series First of the Summer Wine.

=== Wesley Pegden ===
(Gordon Wharmby; 1982, 1984–2002) Edie's husband, who spent all his time in his workshop.

In one of the most popular and often reused scenes in the series, Edie would call Wesley in from his garage and lay down a trail of newspaper for him to stand on, often also slipping sheets onto chairs and walls he was inclined to sit or lean against. Wesley generally kept out of Edie's way in his garage, restoring old motors.

Mechanic Wesley was often called upon by the main trio to construct the many bizarre creations they came up with, and to drive them into the hills for test runs. One recurring theme is the occasional explosion caused by projects in Wesley's shed accompanied by billows of white smoke. On some occasions, Wesley's hat is also smouldering and smoking. In his early years in the series, Wesley seemed to have a love of loud rock music, which led to the trio desperately trying to call over it to get his attention on a number of occasions. Though he was clearly a very skilled builder and mechanic, much of his projects were poorly and hastily built and he would get easily embarrassed and annoyed by anyone managing to fix something he cannot (notably, Compo once managed to rewire Edie's car correctly, much to Wesley's annoyance). Unlike Edie, Wesley did not speak highly of Seymour (Wesley calling him a pillock) and was often annoyed by Seymour's requests to construct the latter's ridiculous inventions as well as Seymour's pompous school headmaster nature. His attitude towards Foggy was similar to that of Seymour but during later years when Truly was introduced on the show he was shown to be more willing to help the trio out in their schemes. Sometimes Wesley would be extremely secretive about his inventions (largely down to his fear of other people copying them) but they were often exposed by the main trio or Edie and would go to extreme lengths to hide what he was building (on one occasion he kept a guard dog in his shed that chased Barry away).

The character first appeared in the 1982 episode "Car and Garter" in a cameo role. The writer and producers liked him so much they brought him back for "The Loxley Lozenge" and again in "Who's Looking After The Cafe Then?". He reappeared in the 1985 feature-length Christmas special "Uncle of the Bride", in which he was established as Edie's husband, at which point both became regulars from this special thereafter.

When Gordon Wharmby died in 2002, the character is said to have also died. Although he was not formally written out, subsequent references to him were in the past tense. His character was last referenced by Glenda in the final series when she claimed "my mother's idea of naked was my father with his cap off". He appears in archive footage in the episode "It's Never Ten Years" (Series 29, Episode 10) marking 10 years since Compo died, although Wharmby is not credited.

=== PC Cooper ===
(Ken Kitson; 1983, 1988–2010, 2014) Kitson first appeared in the 1983 Christmas special "Getting Sam Home" and made two further guest appearances before becoming a semi-regular character from series 12 onwards. In series 29 he was finally given the name PC Cooper. Cooper tends to be the bigger-headed of the two, but he has many ingenious ways of dealing with petty crimes with minimal disruption to his relaxation. In his first episode he is shown to be a friend of Sid's (which was the latter's last appearance on the show before his death). PC Cooper's wife, Mrs Cooper, was often spoken of by Cooper in a negative way, but sometimes he would discuss ways to impress her.

Kitson returned to the role of PC Cooper in a set of shorts, written by Roy Clarke, two of which were released exclusively online. These shorts served as pilots to a potential spin-off that never came to be. The two released shorts are titled "Under Fire" and "Guardians of the Law".

=== "Crusher" Milburn ===
(Jonathan Linsley; 1984–1987) Sid and Ivy's giant, lumbering and very strong nephew, who looked like a younger version of his own late uncle.

The character was first introduced in 1984, following the death of John Comer (who played Sid in the series). Crusher helped his widowed auntie Ivy out in the café for 3½ years. His real name was Milburn, but he insisted on being called "Crusher". He was influenced by the rock and rollers of the 1950s and was into heavy metal music. Well-meaning but not overly bright, he was rather easily led. Crusher was first seen in the touring stage show around 1984 before being introduced into the 8th series. In the 1988 Christmas Special "Crums", he was shown to have a girlfriend (though Crusher himself did not appear in this episode, as Jonathan Linsley had left the show by then) named Fran (played by Yvette Fielding) who, according to Ivy, was as daft as he is. In his early episodes, he seemed to have a crush on Marina, much to Ivy's displeasure. This stemmed from the fact that Ivy told him to find "some poor lass that's had a hard time".

However, Crusher did not return in the tenth series, as Jonathan Linsley left the show to work on other TV projects. Most of the character's humour came from the contrast between his menacing size and his total harmlessness. Following his departure in early 1988 (after the 1987 Christmas special), Ivy ran the café alone (with occasional help from Nora Batty).

=== Marina ===
(Jean Fergusson; 1985–2010) Howard's busty love interest Marina works in the local supermarket. Despite her carefree appearance, Marina is a long-suffering type, having to deal with the disapproval of the prominent village women, the indirect wrath of Pearl, and timorous and neglectful romancing by Howard. She is often thought of as a "tart", and not without reason. She seems to have a soft spot for Clegg (often referring to him as "Norman Clegg that was", implying that they have a past), and occasionally briefly leaves Howard for other men. In the episode "A Double For Howard", she is also content for Eli to kiss her when he impersonates Howard. Marina works as a check-out girl at the local Co-op (although in her initial scenes in the series, the store's name was seen as Lodges). Lodges store was closed by the Co-op in 1997 and the former store is now home to a number of other retailers; Howard often sneaks there to pass or receive notes from her (or more often sends Clegg in his place, leading on several occasions for Marina to believe mistakenly that Clegg is interested in her romantically). In "A Sidecar Named Desire", Clegg reveals that he was once trapped in a lift with Marina and she cuddled him for warmth, much to Howard's ire and jealousy. Though she perceived it to be a romantic incident, it left Clegg terrified of her. Clegg always strongly denies any romantic interest in her. Marina first appeared in the spin-off 1984 Eastbourne summer season show, and soon became a regular character.

=== Howard Sibshaw ===
(Robert Fyfe; 1985–2010) Howard is the shy, beady-eyed, constantly conniving, simpering, henpecked husband of Pearl. Doubtless owing to his wife's domineering nature, Howard often tries to escape from her. Most episodes involve Howard dating peroxide blonde Marina, behind his wife's back. In most episodes, Marina would simper, "Oh Howard", followed by Howard's "Oh Marina" – sometimes the order was reversed. He is a creative but unconvincing liar.

He and Pearl live next door to Clegg, and, much to the annoyance of the latter, Howard is always pestering him for aid in his various schemes to escape Pearl and be with Marina. Over the years he has come up with countless disguises, cover stories and hideaways to allow him to see Marina, all of which have ultimately been doomed or exposed by Pearl. In their earlier appearances, they were frequently shown in disguise with Howard saying, "I think we've really cracked it this time". However, he tends to ignore Marina when he's out with her, partly out of fear of his wife Pearl, and partly because he gets so deeply caught up in fabricating charades to cover up his affair. As a result, their relationship does not appear to have gone beyond hand-holding and gazing into each other's eyes (much to the annoyance of Marina), and the occasional kiss in a field, haystack, or mobile hut somewhere, and it is hinted that if Howard ever did get the chance, he would be too cowardly to go through with it anyway. It has also been suggested that Howard loves Pearl underneath it all.

In later series, Howard was shown to be out of the house more regularly (despite Pearl knowing about his attempted affair with Marina) and eventually became more involved in the schemes of the main trio. Howard first appeared in the Bournemouth summer season show of the series; he was popular enough and felt to have enough potential that he was soon brought into the series in 1985. At first, he, Pearl and Marina were used semi-regularly, but as time passed and their popularity grew, they would appear in every episode (particularly after Wally Batty died). Howard and Pearl's surname was given as Sibshaw in Roy Clarke's novel The Moonbather in 1987, but only mentioned once in the entire TV series, in one of the last episodes, when Glenda refers to Howard as Mr. Sibshaw.

=== Pearl Sibshaw ===
(Juliette Kaplan; 1985–2010) Howard's wife, a bit of a shrew and always one step ahead of his crafty schemes, she is often shown to know about his (attempted) affair with Marina, but is almost gleefully obsessed with exposing Howard's philandering and generally tormenting him. Although she has a fearsome reputation, she, like Nora, occasionally surprises Norman Clegg and others (not including Howard) with displays of kindness, especially after Compo died. She also showed shock when, after seeing Howard in the appropriate uniform, believed he had joined the French foreign legion and outright fainted in a Christmas Special when Compo casually remarked that Howard was in Wesley's hearse.

When she was first introduced on the show, Pearl was somewhat naïve, especially towards Howard's affair with Marina. When introduced to the ladies' tea group, Nora, Ivy, and Edie integrated her into the group and, over time, her demeanour hardened. Her accent also changed during the series.

=== Edie Pegden ===
(Dame Thora Hird; 1986–2003) Edith Pegden, Edie to her friends, was a highly opinionated older woman, sister of Seymour Utterthwaite (who always called her Edith) and Wesley's wife, she was the house-proud hostess of the women's coffee mornings. She was introduced, along with Seymour, daughter Glenda and son-in-law Barry in the 1986 New Years Day special episode "Uncle of the Bride" (husband Wesley had been introduced in 1982, four years before).

The ladies' coffee mornings, where they would sit and discuss life (particularly the shortcomings of men), became a popular staple of the show from the early 1990s onwards; they were usually held in Edie's front room. Wesley restored a red convertible Triumph Herald for her to drive, although she was a terrible driver, and was always accusing Wesley of moving things (particularly the gear lever and clutch) around. The other ladies (including Glenda) often accompanied her on the roads and as a result of Edie's poor driving, they would be fearing for their lives. Another running gag was Edie making a big performance of locking the front door, repeatedly pushing it to check that it was locked properly, a trait that Glenda, her daughter, appears to have inherited in some episodes. When her brother Seymour was around Edie would speak very highly of him and his inventions (refusing to count his numerous failed ones) despite the other ladies thinking he is just as daft as the rest of the trio (although when Seymour's antics became extreme Edie would secretly be annoyed and embarrassed).

In later years, Hird, who was still in the series at the age of 91, suffered from poor health, which affected her ability to stand. To cover this, she was often seen sitting down, or, when standing, had something to hold on to due to her frailty (often out of camera shot). For driving and distance shots, her double, Amy Shaw, was used.

When Thora Hird died in 2003, Edie was also said to have died. As with her husband Wesley previously, it was not immediately made obvious, but later references to the character indicated that she had died. In the final three series, a framed photo of Edie can be seen on Barry and Glenda's mantelpiece.

In one episode Barry talks about ghosts and Glenda asks if he had seen her mother. Barry's response in the negative includes immense gladness, in that she scared him enough alive.

For the first few series in which she appeared, Edie was extremely concerned with her reputation in the neighbourhood: whenever there was company, Edie would try to put on a posh, educated voice – which would suddenly vanish when she was shouting for (or at) Wesley. Edie's character was a prototype for Hyacinth Bucket in Keeping Up Appearances (also written by Roy Clarke). In the episode "Who's That Bloke With Nora Batty Then?" Edie says the line "Pegden residence, the lady of the house speaking" in order to seem of a higher class. This would later be used by Clarke word-perfect for Hyacinth's catchphrase "Bucket residence, the lady of the house speaking". Once the latter series was created, this aspect of Edie's personality was slightly toned down (although not completely) in order to differentiate the two characters.

=== Barry Wilkinson ===
(Mike Grady; 1986–1990, 1996–2010) Meek and mild husband of Glenda. Dull and ineffectual, building society employee Barry strives for executive advancement and adventure but seems destined for paperwork and domesticity. His one pride is his shiny new car, which he was always trying to keep away from father-in-law Wesley, who could not resist tinkering under the bonnet (although in one episode, he did completely dismantle the engine).

Barry is often trying out new hobbies in an attempt to stop his life being humdrum; and in more recent years, has made a number of attempts to fit in at a local golf club, often upsetting the golf captain "the Major". Though he clearly loved his wife he was afraid to kiss her in public, out of fear of being judged by the neighbours. He was also afraid of his mother in law Edie, largely because she (along with the other ladies) would often judge Barry or accuse him of being guilty. In later series Barry became more regularly involved in the schemes of the main trio and in series 28–29 was often involved in schemes with Alvin, Entwistle and Howard. After being introduced in the feature-length "Uncle of the Bride" in 1986, which centres around Barry and Glenda's wedding, Barry was much-mentioned but not seen for around six years when Mike Grady originally left to pursue several other television projects, before returning as a regular from 1996 thereafter. He is one of the few characters to have left the series but subsequently returned.

=== Glenda Wilkinson ===
(Sarah Thomas; 1986–2010) Daughter of Edie and Wesley. The other women in the group consider that she is somewhat naïve, even when she reaches middle-age; when her mother was alive, if she attempted to join in a mature conversation, Edie would snap "Drink your coffee!" She speaks glowingly of her husband Barry, but is often insecure and unsatisfied with him at home, usually because of the pressure of her mother and other ladies in the group. She often comes to the defence of men when other women in the group speak the worst about them, and does not believe that all men are evil, as they do. Likewise, she is generally shown to be kinder to the main trio than the other ladies (particularly when her uncle Seymour was with them, and notably, in the episode "The McDonaghs of Jamieson Street", when she lends Billy a skirt after his trousers are mauled by a vicious dog). She appears, like her husband, to have a very meek demeanour, but under duress she has proven to be quite a force to be reckoned with. In the very last episode of the programme, Glenda clearly seems to have joined the bossy Yorkshire women's brigade in her suggestions to Barry and Morton that are, in Barry's words "not optional". Although the rest of the ladies (particularly Pearl) disliked the flirtatious Marina, Glenda was seen to strike up friendship with her on a number of occasions (although this role was generally taken by Miss Davenport in the later series).

=== Eli Duckett ===
(Danny O'Dea; 1987–2002) An extremely long-sighted bumbler, Eli maintained a highly cheerful, friendly attitude despite not having a clue what was going on around him. He generally made only brief cameo appearances, walking into a scene and commenting on his long-sighted misinterpretation of the action, and then walking off again. He was occasionally seen on a bicycle.

On occasion, his long-sightedness caused him to walk into slapstick (and carefully choreographed) mishaps such as walking into the back of a lorry and over the tops of cars, or falling into a skip. For much of his time in the series, Eli also had a Jack Russell dog (which once disappeared, leading Eli to mistake a sheep for the dog). Despite his long-sightedness, Eli is eternally cheerful and optimistic, and glad to see anyone who stops to talk to him. In one episode, a passing comment by Compo seemed to suggest that Eli was a sniper during the Second World War.

In the 1995 New Year Special episode featuring Sir Norman Wisdom, "The Man Who Nearly Knew Pavarotti", Eli is the conductor of the Holme Silver Band. Originally brought in as a friend of Wally Batty, the character was so popular that Eli remained on the show after the death of actor Joe Gladwin. Eli and Wally appeared together in the series 9 episode, "Jaws", in 1987.

Eli never appeared again following the departure from production of the series, and eventual death of O'Dea, though the character was not explicitly killed off. He was replaced in one episode by two drunks (who were also in earlier episodes of the series, sometimes credited as Villagers), but appeared in only a few episodes. When Eli left the policeman's role was extended and they served as a replacement to the Eli gags.

=== Second Policeman ===
(Tony Capstick; 1987, 1990–2004) Capstick made his first appearance in the 1987 special "Big Day at Dream Acres", before becoming a semi-regular alongside Kitson from series 12 in 1990, up to his death in late 2003. His last appearance was the episode "Yours Truly – If You're Not Careful". Capstick's character was spacey and less intelligent even than the often-oblivious Cooper. In a 2005 episode, his character was said to have transferred to Huddersfield.

=== Clem "Smiler" Hemingway ===
(Stephen Lewis; 1988, 1990–2007) Eternally miserable and none-too-bright comic foil, Clem "Smiler" Hemingway was similar to Lewis' previous character Inspector Cyril "Blakey" Blake in LWT's hit comedy On the Buses (some episodes of which he co-wrote) from 1969 to 1973. Smiler was first mentioned (as Smiler Ogden) in the episode "Edie and the Automobile", and was first seen as a one-off character in 1988's "That Certain Smile", in which the trio had to sneak a hospitalised Smiler's beloved dog Bess in to see him. During his first appearance he was referred to by everyone else as his real name "Clem". The character was popular enough to be brought back on a semi-regular basis, and was a regular throughout the 1990s and most of the 2000s (although his dog died between his first and second appearances). In some early appearances, he was a lollipop man, but for much of his time on the show worked for Auntie Wainwright, with whom he seems to be suffering some sort of indentured servitude. In early appearances, Smiler was also a lodger with Nora Batty, which enraged the jealous Compo. Smiler once described working for Nora Batty as like being in the Army again, and always on Jankers. He also described it as akin to jail at Stalag 14. Smiler owned a big, but rather beaten up and poorly maintained, white convertible 1972 Chevrolet Impala, in which he sometimes drove around with Tom, and which on occasion has been used in various promotions for Auntie Wainwright. The trio would often cross paths with Smiler and use him for whatever scheme or activity they were doing (largely because of his tall height and gormless nature). Smiler was last seen in the series 28 episode "Sinclair and the Wormley Witches". Lewis left the show at the end of series 28 because of ill health. He was last mentioned in the series 29 episode "Of Passion and Pizza", with Tom saying that Smiler had disappeared.

=== PC Walsh ===
(Louis Emerick; 1988–1989, 2004–2010, 2014) Emerick first appeared alongside Kitson in "Downhill Racer". He made one more appearance in the next series, in the episode "Three Men and a Mangle", and later reappeared in 2004 to partner Kitson after Tony Capstick's death. In series 29 he was finally given the name PC Walsh. Walsh is more level-headed than Cooper and enjoys "taking the mickey", but he tends to be a little more naïve.

Emerick returned to the role of PC Walsh in a set of shorts, written by Roy Clarke, two of which were released exclusively online. These shorts served as pilots to a potential spin-off that never came to be. The two released shorts are titled "Under Fire" and "Guardians of the Law".

=== Auntie Wainwright ===
(Jean Alexander; 1988–1989, 1992–2010) Howard's aunt, a sly and grasping bric-a-brac shop owner. Whilst she and her nephew both have a general predisposition towards sneakiness, Auntie Wainwright is much more adept at applying it. Everyone calls her "Auntie", although she appears to be a literal aunt only to Howard.

Clegg is reluctant to go into her shop, since she always sells him something he does not want, but she usually finds ways to trick him into entering. She is extremely mean, and pretends to be cheated when she gives the slightest discount. At Compo's funeral, she grabbed Eli by the arm and pretended to be blind in order to avoid giving money to a collection outside the church. Whenever customers entered the shop she would surprise them by talking through a loudspeaker, saying things like "Stay where you are!" and "Don't touch anything or you will be electrocuted". Though she is largely based in her usual junk shop, she was occasionally shown to own (or she was the tenant of) other shops and even junkyards (which comes to the shock of the trio and other characters)- in Series 14's "Who's Got Rhythm?" (1992), when her self-description as a "poor, defenceless old woman" is queried on the basis that she owns "half the street", she observes her ownership is in fact of "three-quarters". She was also extremely security conscious (even pointing a shotgun at the trio on one occasion).

As with several other characters, she was originally seen in a "one-off" appearance in the 1988 Christmas Special "Crums". However, she became so popular that she was brought back for a second appearance at Christmas 1989, eventually becoming a regular from 1992 thereafter.

Note: Auntie Wainwright has no known relation to Mr Wainwright from the library.

=== Roz Utterthwaite ===
(Dora Bryan; 2000–2005) Edie's and Seymour's sister, who has always been more romantically adventurous, to Edie's unending shame. She often speaks of past flings, frequently with married men. She was often paired with Pearl Sibshaw. Roz was last seen at the end of the 26th series, following the departure of Bryan owing to ill health. Her role of being paired with Pearl was replaced by June Whitfield's character Nelly.

Before Roz actually appeared in the series, she had never been mentioned and it was not known that Edie and Seymour had a sister. In the credits her name is spelt as both "Roz" and "Ros" on numerous occasions.

=== "Lolly" Minerva Avery ===
(Julie T. Wallace; 2000–2001) Lolita "Lolly" Minerva Avery, known as Mrs. Avery to most, was Tom's live-in "associate"; much larger than him, and something of a battle-axe, yet rather easily manipulated. Although Tom always insisted that she was merely an acquaintance, Mrs Avery always wanted more, and was under the impression that Tom had promised to marry her. After a brief spell of living in the pair's bus, they moved into the deceased Compo's home, next-door to Nora Batty. During her stay at Compo's home, she began a rivalry with Nora, often copying each other (cleaning their windows or vacuuming their rugs). This was not to last; she threw Tom out and disappeared from the series after two years on the show. Babs Avery (Helen Turaya; 2000) was Mrs. Avery's niece who arrived with Tom, involved in a couple of schemes. The character was so unpopular that she was axed after just three episodes without explanation.

=== Morton Beemish ===
(Christopher Beeny; 2001–2005, 2007–2010) Originally known as the "Repo Man", Herman Teesdale who is always pursuing Tom Simmonite, claiming that he owes money.

He is determined but gullible, and Tom always evades him. From 2005 onwards, he was not only mentioned by name, but also calls on Barry for social visits, with Barry not being too thrilled at this newfound friendship. In certain episodes in 2005, it is clear that he still repossesses belongings, which Glenda suggests is the reason none of his friendships lasted: he kept repossessing his friends' goods.

The character returned in a 2007 episode of the show; and again in the 2008 New Year special, saying that he has retired from debt collecting and changed his name to Morton Beemish in order to start a new life for himself. He seeks out the friendship of his former nemesis, Tom (though Tom was still suspicious of him and would often hide from him when he saw sight of him).

In the final two seasons (30–31), the character almost lives next door to Barry and Glenda as a near-lodger with Toby Mulberry Smith (aka The Captain).

A previous episode from 1989 featured a character called Jack Harry Teesdale, but it is not established whether they are related.

=== Toby Mulberry Smith ===
(Trevor Bannister; 1992, 2001–2006, 2008–2010) The Captain of the local golf club where Barry is often trying to fit in as a member; but, despite his best efforts to impress him, Barry always manages to annoy or offend the Captain, either by becoming involved with some escapade with the main trio, or by some other social faux pas.

He had previously played a tailor in the 1992 episode "Who's Got Rhythm?", which could be the same character but is unconfirmed. The Captain returned for the 2008 New Years Special, "I Was A Hitman For Primrose Dairies", where he received a name, Toby, for the first time. In series 30 he moves in next door to Barry and Glenda, and shortly afterwards gains Morton Beemish (aka Herman Teesdale), the former repo man, as a near-lodger, since he is always there doing tasks around the house. During this time his relationship with Barry appeared to improve, and the two (along with Glenda) would often bond over their annoyance towards Morton.

=== Lucinda Davenport ===
(Josephine Tewson, 2003–2010) After many years of the library setting seldom being used, Miss Davenport was introduced as the new librarian in 2003. A very emotional woman haunted by a string of past rejections, she first appeared as a guest, driving Gavin Hinchcliffe (Bernard Cribbins) around while he skied on the van roof. Originally, Glenda took up the cause of socialising her and tried to fit her in with the coffee-drinker circle of Nora, Ivy, Pearl et al. They did not take too well to each other; in later episodes, she bonded with Marina instead, the pair both longing for love in their individual ways. In the episode "In Which Howard Remembers Where He Left His Bicycle Pump", it is revealed that Miss Davenport's first name is "Lucinda".

=== Nelly ===
(June Whitfield; 2001, 2005–2010) A later addition to the ladies' coffee-drinking set, and Pearl's comrade-in-arms. Nelly's never-seen husband Travis needs constant attention, which Nelly generally administers over her mobile phone. Nelly occasionally provides more "sophisticated" viewpoints as a result of having lived further south for some time, but even she regards them with some befuddlement. Whitfield previously made a "one off" appearance in the series as a different character, Delphi Potts, in the 2001 Christmas Special, "Potts in Pole Position", married to Lother (played by Warren Mitchell), a couple of years before she became a regular as Nelly. In Series 30, she became the object of Hobbo's obsession when he became convinced that she was his long-lost mother, much to her annoyance. She was one of the only two regular characters (the other being Ivy) not to appear in the final episode. She reveals to Hobbo her full name used to be Nelly Bradshaw, before marrying Travis.

=== Stella ===
(Barbara Young; 2008–2010) Stella is Nora's sister; she first appeared in the 2008 New Year's Special, "I Was A Hitman for Primrose Dairies" as a replacement for and to compensate for the absence of actress Kathy Staff (who was unable to continue her role as Nora owing to ill health and her subsequent death).

With Nora having departed for Australia, Stella moved in to house-sit for her sister, and had become a new member of the elder women's talking circle. She is a former pub landlady and appears to take a more free-spirited approach to life than Nora, as evidenced by her brighter wardrobe and hair. The storyline in her first episode saw her trying to give up smoking, and her yearning for a cigarette continued unabated into subsequent episodes. Despite this, she was equally as annoyed as Nora by the pranks that Alvin played on her.

In the 2008 episode "Get Out of That, Then", Young wore a brown wig and played the part of Florrie, wife of Barry's cousin Lenny (Bobby Ball).

== Supporting characters ==
=== The Library ===
In the early years of the show, the trio used to frequent the library and had a fractious relationship with the librarians.

- Mr Wainwright (Blake Butler; 1973, 1976) was the rather timid head of the local library, which the trio visited a lot in the show's early days – Compo nicknamed him 'Old Shagnasty'. Mr Wainwright left at the same time as Mrs Partridge's departure (see below), but was "transferred back" to the area in the third series, featuring in two episodes where he was once again romancing his new assistant, Miss Moody. It is shown in Series 1 he, unlike Miss Probert, approves of the books with four-letter words. (Note: Mr Wainwright is not related to Auntie Wainwright.)
- Mrs Partridge (Rosemary Martin; 1973) was another librarian at the same library who engaged in an affair with Mr Wainwright which they mistakenly believed was secret. The characters were never really felt to catch on, and disappeared as the library was written out as a favourite haunt of the main trio. However, a few years later, the storyline was resurrected and used for Howard and Marina. The library was also brought back for Foggy to get thrown out of all the time. She has a twelve-year-old son, who is seen in "Short Back and Palais Glide".
- Miss Probert (June Watson; 1975) was one of the librarians who briefly replaced Wainwright and Partridge during the second series. Miss Probert is a radical "feminist", who is always railing against men to the more timid Miss Jones. Miss Probert has two missions in life; one is discouraging the lending out of books she considers "filthy"; the other is making a misandrist out of Miss Jones, in whom she seems to take a more than professional interest. Her disappearance from the series is unexplained, and it is presumed she went back to wherever she worked before.
- Miss Jones (Janet Davies; 1975) was the other librarian who replaced Mr. Wainwright and Mrs. Partridge in the second series. Miss Jones is a quiet, timid female who is overshadowed by Miss Probert. She previously worked in a children's library, which she frequently says she wants to return to. She has a pair of pink fly-away glasses that are on a chain around her neck. She does not like working at the Holmfirth library, because of the four-letter words. She always does what Miss Probert asks her, always without question or protest. Like Miss Probert, her disappearance is unexplained, and it is believed she returned to the children's library. This is most likely due to the remark she made to Miss Probert about wanting to go back where "Puss in Boots means just that and not like that awful magazine".
- Miss Moody (Kate Brown; 1976) joined Mr. Wainwright upon his return. She only appeared in two episodes, and it is shown she shares Mr. Wainwrights dreams about revolution. She is the first woman to suffer the sight of Compo's matchbox. Although middle-aged, she is attractive and she and Mr. Wainwright are believed to one of the original structures for Howard and Marina.

=== Holmfirth residents ===
Throughout the show, guest characters have appeared more than once in the series, making several appearances.

- Norris Fairburn (David Williams; 1983, 1985, 1993, 1995, 2008) was the haberdasher making his first appearance in the 1983 episode "Getting Sam Home". In his first appearance he had an unseen wife, but by his final appearance she had left him. He was also seen running a shop in one of his 90s guest turns.
- James Casey (James Casey; 1988, 1992–1993, 1995, 2003, 2006) made five appearances as a drunk with Eli Woods. The character's name was originally unknown, but in his 2006 appearance he was credited with appearing as himself thus his real name is his characters name. He also appeared alone as a library attendant in the 1992 episode "Phantom of the Graveyard". In real life he was a cousin of Eli Woods.
- Eli Woods (Eli Woods; 1988, 1993, 1995, 2003, 2006) made five appearances as a drunk with James Casey. The character's name was originally unknown, but in his 2006 appearance he was credited with appearing as himself thus his real name is his character's name.
- Jack Harry Teasdale (Bert Parnaby; 1989–1990) made two appearances in the series as a person known to the trio. He is seen to be a shopkeeper in his second appearance.
- Billy Ingleton (Sir Norman Wisdom; 1995–1996, 2001–2002, 2004) was originally intended to make one guest appearance in the show, and ended up as a recurring character, as did many others. He originally played the hapless Billy Ingleton in the 1995 New Year special "The Man Who Nearly Knew Pavarotti". He proved so popular that like Auntie Wainwright before him, he was asked to appear in the following year's special ("Extra! Extra!"). From then on, much-loved comedian Norman Wisdom occasionally pops up, sometimes for the storyline of an episode, at other times in smaller appearances. He is not always credited for smaller appearances.
- Lenny Joliffe (Bobby Ball; 2005–2006, 2008) was originally from the Pickle factory, but wanted to be known as "The Swan Man of Ilkley". He joined the quartet/trio on three occasions where they assisted his adventures. Lenny is mentioned as being a cousin of Barry Wilkinson.
- Cliff Joliffe (Tommy Cannon; 2005–2006, 2008) was a relation of Lenny. He made his first and second appearances briefly after being inconvenienced by the character of Lenny during boating. He is later revealed to be a relation of Lenny and by extension this also means he is related to Barry. Lenny and Cliff are both played by real-life comedy duo Cannon and Ball.
