= Last of the Summer Wine series 31 =

Last of the Summer Wine
- Series 31
- No. of episodes: 6

Release
- Original network: BBC One
- Original release: 25 July – 29 August 2010

Additional information
- Filming dates: Series 31: 2009

Series chronology
- ← Previous; 30

The thirty-first and final series of Last of the Summer Wine aired in 2010, beginning on 25 July. All six episodes were thirty minutes long; they were written by Roy Clarke, and directed by Alan J. W. Bell.

The series was the first in 19 years to be only six episodes long, owing in part to the BBC's axing of the show and then recommissioning it. Actress Juliette Kaplan (Pearl) wrote on her website that the series was a result of fan response to rumours of the show's axing in December 2008, while Bell also credited the series to fan reaction.

== Overview ==
The series continued with the same trio from series 30, with Russ Abbot (Hobbo), Burt Kwouk (Entwistle), and Brian Murphy (Alvin). Peter Sallis (Clegg) and Frank Thornton (Truly), who were previously central characters, remained, but were now secondary characters, taping only studio scenes owing to the cost of insurance for actors of their advanced age on location. Jane Freeman (Ivy) also filmed only in-studio scenes.

The series contains a loose story arc of Pearl throwing Howard out of their house and his attempts to return.

On 2 June 2010, the BBC announced that the 31st series would be the last, despite the show still having a loyal fan base. To commemorate the show's final appearance, the BBC broadcast Songs of Praise from Holmfirth, and a special edition of Countryfile about Holmfirth and the surrounding area (where the series was primarily filmed). The Countryfile special aired on 25 July straight after the first episode of the final series. Songs of Praise from Holmfirth aired on 29 August, the day the last ever episode was broadcast.

That final episode, "How Not to Cry at Weddings", was dubbed "The Very Last of the Summer Wine" in the Radio Times edition dated 28 August – 3 September 2010. However, that title modification was not used when the episode was transmitted. The Radio Times edition also included a feature on actor Sallis, headlined "It never occurred to me that I could be an actor".

In an interview conducted several years after the series' end, Roy Clarke revealed that, although he knew the series was ending, he did not want to write a definitive ending: "I knew by that time that it likely was [the end], but I still didn't make a huge splash about it. Just in case, you know?"

All twenty remaining cast characters made their final appearances. Ivy and Nelly's final appearances were in the penultimate episode, "Look Whose Wheel's Come Off". The remaining eighteen (Note: Hobbo, Entwistle, Alvin, Clegg, Truly, Howard, Stella, PC Cooper, PC Walsh, Toby, Morton, Pearl, Glenda, Barry, Marina, Miss Davenport, Tom and Aunty Wainwright) signed off in the final episode, "How Not to Cry at Weddings", most notably Norman Clegg, who appeared in every one of the 295 episodes and who spoke the last line of the series. Barring his role in Wallace and Gromit's World of Invention later in 2010, the episode was also the final acting turn for Clegg's actor Peter Sallis before his death in 2017.

== Episodes ==
No. overall	No. in series	Title	Original release date	Notes
290	1	"Behind Every Bush There Is Not Necessarily a Howard"	25 July 2010	Audience of 4.93m – 23rd most watched programme of the week.
Hobbo enlists the services of his "team" to help Toby win back the affections of his ex-wife. Glenda decides to make it her mission to find Morton a woman. Howard sneaks into the library to tell Marina there's a problem with their bike ride that afternoon – Pearl is going out, too. Meanwhile, PCs Cooper and Walsh try out a new in-car fryer.
291	2	"Happy Camping"	1 August 2010	An apparent appearance by Peter Sallis and Frank Thornton in an outdoor scene in this episode is achieved by green screen technology.; Audience of 4.14m – 34th most watched programme of the week.
Pearl throws Howard out of the house, but when he goes to Clegg's for sympathy it falls on deaf ears, while Pearl tells Nelly she's going to have to sort out Howard once and for all. Meanwhile, Glenda decides that Barry and herself are fat and that something must be done before Gloria's wedding, and forces Barry to embark on a new fitness regime. And PC Walsh informs PC Cooper that the sergeant is on their back – he's complaining about the amount of crumbs they're leaving in the car.
292	3	"The Rights of Man (Except for Howard)"	8 August 2010	An apparent appearance by Peter Sallis and Frank Thornton in an outdoor scene in this episode is achieved by green screen technology.; Audience of 4.06m – 36th most watched programme of the week.
Hobbo decides that the still-homeless Howard needs to show Pearl who's boss, but after Pearl slams the door in his face, Howard is despondent. Hobbo is insistent that Howard just needs to remind Pearl of the good times. But will his bicycle skills be enough to win her back? Meanwhile, Marina helps Miss Davenport upgrade her appearance, and decides to seize the moment with Mr Waddle.
293	4	"Howard and the Great Outdoors"	15 August 2010	Howard and Pearl's surname, Sibshaw, from Roy Clarke's 1987 novel The Moonbather, is used for the first and only time in a televised episode.; Audience of 4.23m – 35th most watched programme of the week.
Attempting to persuade Pearl to take her errant husband back, Howard's friends try to convince her he has become a tramp – but he is far from happy with the prospect of going it alone in the wilderness. Meanwhile, Toby's bid to win back his wife, Monica, is thwarted by a dog, and Marina decides to try dressing down for a change.
294	5	"Look Whose Wheel's Come Off"	22 August 2010	Final appearances of Ivy and Nelly.; Audience of 4.55m – 29th most watched programme of the week.
Wondering whether Pearl still loves him, Howard asks Hobbo to give her a peck on the cheek from him – only to become even more despondent when he sees his wife deliver a passionate kiss. Meanwhile, Glenda sends Barry off to paint a landscape, hoping the activity will take his mind off his hunger – but fish and chips is the only thing on his mind.
295	6	"How Not to Cry at Weddings"	1 August 2010	Guest appearance of David Ross.; Final appearances of the remaining eighteen regular cast characters.; Final episode of the series.; This episode was referred to as "The Very Last of the Summer Wine" in TV listings and TV trailers, but not in the actual episode itself.; Audience of 5.71m – 19th most watched programme of the week.
In this final episode, everyone is getting ready for a wedding, prompting Howard and Pearl to look back at their relationship. Meanwhile, Alvin flirts with Stella, Toby tries to smarten himself up in a bid to win back Monica, and Clegg worries that he's forgotten something important.

== DVD release ==
The box set for series thirty-one was released by Universal Playback in August 2016, mislabelled as a box set for series 31 & 32.

The Complete Series 31 & 32
Set Details
- 18 episodes
- 4-disc set
- Language: English
Release Date
Region 2
15 August 2016
