= Last of the Summer Wine series 9 =

Last of the Summer Wine
- Series 9
- Last of the Summer Wine Series 9 & 10 DVD
- No. of episodes: 15

Release
- Original network: BBC1
- Original release: 1 January 1986 – 27 December 1987

Additional information
- Filming dates: New Year's special: 1986; Series 9: 1987; Christmas specials: 1986, 1987

Season chronology
- ← Previous; 8 Next → 10

The ninth series of Last of the Summer Wine originally aired on BBC1 between 1 January 1986 and 27 December 1987. All episodes were written by Roy Clarke, and produced and directed by Alan J. W. Bell.

The ninth series was released on DVD in region 2 as a box set on 5 May 2008.

For reasons not disclosed, the DVD box set in the UK splits series 9 into two series, renaming the second half as series 10. As a consequence, every subsequent DVD release is mis-numbered (series 10 is now series 11; series 11 is now series 12, etc).

== Characters ==
The trio in this series consisted of Compo (Bill Owen), Clegg (Peter Sallis) and Seymour (Michael Aldridge). This series marks the first appearances of Seymour Utterthwaite (1986–1990), Edie Pegden (1986–2003), Barry Wilkinson (1986-1990, 1996–2010), Glenda Wilkinson (1986–2010), Eli Duckett (1987–2002), and Second Policeman (1987, 1990–2004), as well as the final appearances of Wally Batty (1975–1987) and Crusher (1984–1987).

== Episodes ==
No. overall	No. in series	Title	Original release date	Notes
62	New–Special	"Uncle of the Bride"	1 January 1986	This was a 85-minute special, a film made for television.; This episode marks the first appearance of Seymour Utterthwaite.; This episode also marks the first appearances of Edie, Glenda and Barry, all of whom started to appear regularly shortly after.; This is the second episode to have no laughter track.; Wesley became a regular character from this episode (until 2002).; According to dialogue in this episode, Foggy has moved to Bridlington to take over a family egg-painting business, situated on the harbour.; In 1994, after Michael Aldridge's death, this special was repeated in his memory.; This episode had ratings of 18.10 million viewers, making it the 8th most watched programme of 1986.; Included on the Series 9 & 10 boxset
This episode introduces Seymour as the show's new "Third Man". Glenda, Edie and Wesley's daughter, is marrying the hapless but kind-hearted Barry. Seymour, her uncle and Edie's brother, is in charge of the pre-nuptial celebrations.
63	Christmas–Special	"Merry Christmas, Father Christmas"	28 December 1986	The runtime of this episode is just short of 35 minutes.; This episode had ratings of 16.30 million viewers.; Included on the Series 9 & 10 boxset.
It's Christmas 1986, and Seymour attempts to instil some magic into the festive season by dressing a reluctant Compo as Father Christmas.
64	1	"Why Does Norman Clegg Buy Ladies' Elastic Stockings?"	4 January 1987	The runtime of this episode is just short of 34 minutes.; The theme tune of Dallas is parodied in the style of the Last of the Summer Wine theme when Clegg and Compo use Seymour's bike to drill for oil.; This is the first episode since it began in 1973 to open indoors in the studio and on videotape (all previous 62 episodes, plus pilot, open outdoors on location and on film).; The episode is edited by about 4 minutes on the region 1 DVD release.
Howard persuades a reluctant Clegg to take a message to Marina in the store where she works. Clegg buys random items, including ladies' stockings, in order to explain his extended presence in the store while he waits for a chance to pass the message. Seymour invents a drill and uses it in an attempt to find oil, with unhappy results.
65	2	"The Heavily Reinforced Bottom"	11 January 1987	Filming took place near the Standedge Tunnels, (at the Tunnel End Cottages, close by). This location would be used again in the Series 10 episode "The Treasure of the Deep".
Compo takes up canoeing, with disastrous results.
66	3	"Dried Dates and Codfanglers"	18 January 1987	-
Seymour invents a high-security door lock, which fails miserably. Compo has lost a prized possession – a date Nora Batty threw at him!
67	4	"The Really Masculine Purse"	25 January 1987	-
After Compo claims that any man who uses a purse is effeminate, Seymour tries to invent a strictly masculine purse.
68	5	"Who's Feeling Ejected, Then?"	1 February 1987	-
Seymour builds an ejector seat, which Compo is persuaded to test.
69	6	"The Ice-Cream Man Cometh"	8 February 1987	-
Seymour misses the good old days, and decides to promote the old tradition of bicycling ice-cream men.
70	7	"Set the People Free"	15 February 1987	-
Howard and Wally have both been confined to quarters, and it's up to the trio to try to break them free.
71	8	"Go with the Flow"	22 February 1987	During this episode. a Hornby model of Annie or Clarabel from the popular children's TV series Thomas the Tank Engine & Friends can be seen.
Seymour volunteers the trio to help the Vicar and they are assigned to sell tickets for a production of Beatrix Potter – but all he succeeds in doing is getting himself thrown out of the local pub. Will Compo fare any better?
72	9	"Jaws"	1 March 1987	This episode marked the first appearance of Eli (Danny O'Dea), who became a regular shortly after.
Seymour invents a new waste disposal unit for Edie.
73	9	"Edie and the Automobile"	8 March 1987	This episode sees the start of a recurring joke, that would remain throughout the series, regarding Edie and her terrible driving.; Despite her awful driving, later episodes suggest Edie passed her test somehow.; First mention of Smiler.
Edie is having driving lessons – no-one is safe!
74	10	"Wind Power"	15 March 1987	-
Seymour's invents wind-powered rollerskates.
75	11	"When You take a Good Bite, Yorkshire Tastes Terrible"	22 March 1987	This episode marks the final appearance of Wally Batty. Joe Gladwin died less than a fortnight before it was broadcast.
Clegg receives word that an old friend in America, Bill Henry Duffield, died six months earlier. The trio relive some happy memories as a tribute.
76	Christmas–Special	"Big Day at Dream Acres"	27 December 1987	This was a 79-minute special, a film made for television.; This special marks the final appearance of Crusher, as Jonathan Linsley left the show having gone on a crash diet, which meant the character of Milburn couldn't continue.; This is the 3rd and final episode to have no laughter track.; Guest appearances of Ray McAnally and David Ellison; First appearance of Tony Capstick as a policeman.; Included on the Series 9 & 10 boxset.; The music played by the brass band at the end of this episode would later be used in "Just a Small Funeral".
There's a big fête at Dream Acres. But why is a tramp so interested in one of the donkeys?

When recordings were "repackaged" for overseas sale, UK series 9 (12 episodes) was split into "Season 9" and "Season 10" (each of 6 episodes), with all subsequent "seasons" being renumbered accordingly. As a result, (for example) "Series 27" in the UK may be referred to as "Season 28" in the USA. This mis-numbering occurs on the UK DVD releases for reasons unknown.

== DVD release ==
The box set for series nine was released by Universal Playback in May 2008, mislabelled as a box set for series 9 & 10.

The Complete Series 9 & 10
Set Details
- 15 episodes
- 3-disc set
- Language: English
Release Date
Region 2
5 May 2008
