= Last of the Summer Wine series 25 =

Last of the Summer Wine
- Series 25
- No. of episodes: 11

Release
- Original network: BBC One
- Original release: 21 December 2003 – 18 April 2004

Additional information
- Filming dates: Christmas special: 2003; Series 25: 2003

Season chronology
- ← Previous; 24 Next → 26

The twenty-fifth series of Last of the Summer Wine aired on BBC One. All of the episodes were written by Roy Clarke, and produced and directed by Alan J. W. Bell.

== Characters ==
The trio in this series consisted of Clegg (Peter Sallis), Truly (Frank Thornton) and Billy (Keith Clifford). Second Policeman (1987, 1990–2004) appeared for the final time due to the actor's death.

== Episodes ==
No. overall	No. in series	Title	Original release date	Notes
225	Christmas–Special	"A Short Blast of Fred Astaire"	21 December 2003	Alvin and Miss Davenport become regulars from this episode until the end.; Audience of 5.9m – 38th most watched programme of the week.; Lionel Blair makes an appearance as himself, and Damian Jackson makes an appearance as Santa Claus.; The show's closing theme uses an arrangement of "Puttin' On the Ritz" to accompany the dance scene.
With preparations in hand for the Christmas concert, there is a confidence problem among some of the talent. Who better than an electrical engineer from Hull to bestow some ancient eastern hypnotism to help them?
226	1	"Jurassic – No Parking"	8 February 2004	From this episode until the end, Norman Clegg is given gradually reduced roles owing to Peter Sallis's health; however, he occasionally has slightly larger roles.; Audience of 5.9m – 40th most watched programme of the week.
Barry wins a contest and receives more prize than Glenda can handle.
227	2	"The General's Greatest Battle"	15 February 2004	Norman Wisdom makes his sixth guest appearance as Billy Ingleton.; First time Billy's house is seen and first time his wife is heard talking.; Audience of 5.76m – 39th most watched programme of the week.
Clegg, Truly, and the others end up destroying a mannequin that is supposed to ride with Nora in the holiday float.
228	3	"Spores"	29 February 2004	Guest appearances of Roy Hudd and Anita Carey.; Audience of 4.86m – 61st most watched programme of the week.
Truly and Billy aid a woman in finding her "Lionel" while Alvin tries to get a photograph of Nora Batty.
229	4	"Happy Birthday, Robin Hood"	7 March 2004	Audience of 5.27m – 44th most watched programme of the week.
When he sees Marina wearing a wedding dress and being driven through town, Howard becomes distraught, putting a damper on Billy's plans to celebrate Robin Hood's birthday.
230	5	"Who's That With Barry and Glenda – It's Not Barry and Glenda"	14 March 2004	Audience of 5.93m – 44th most watched programme of the week.; Jean Alexander is billed in the opening credits but does not appear.
Truly, Clegg and Billy surprise Barry in the wood carrying a suitcase. Truly deduces that he is up to something serious and decides to investigate. Meanwhile, Glenda is also concerned about Barry and his suitcase, and decides to follow him (dressed as a man) to see if another woman is involved.
231	6	"An Apple a Day"	21 March 2004	Billy Hardcastle does not appear in this episode.; Audience of 5.86m – 37th most watched programme of the week.
Nora Batty informs Alvin that he has volunteered to take some old-timers out for the day. After enlisting some support from Clegg and Truly, they all proceed to the Scrooby's distant farm to pick them up. But taking out Bert and his cranky old wife Sal isn't going to be easy.
232	7	"Barry Becomes a Psychopathic Killer – But Only Part Time"	28 March 2004	Billed as "Barry Becomes a Psychopathic Killer" in the Radio Times listing for the episode.; Audience of 4.62m – 32nd most watched programme of the week.
Smiler needs to get rid of an unwanted admirer who thinks he has money. Clegg, and then Barry, are recruited to dampen her enthusiasm.
233	8	"Things to Do When Your Wife Runs Off with a Turkish Waiter"	4 April 2004	Audience of 5.49m – 39th most watched programme of the week.
Barry unwittingly becomes the friend of a lonely man whose wife has deserted him. This minor inconvenience turns into a major embarrassment when it turns out the man's favourite hobby is "charming the birds out of the trees" with "sweet music".
234	9	"Beware of Laughing at Nora's Hats"	11 April 2004	Audience of 4.87m – 51st most watched programme of the week.
Clegg, Truly, Alvin and Billy unite to help end a long-running feud between Nora Batty and Audrey Craig, which began when Audrey laughed at one of Nora's hats.
235	10	"Yours Truly – If You're Not Careful"	18 April 2004	This episode marks the final appearance of Tony Capstick as the policeman owing to his death six months before. Louis Emerick would take over his role from the 2004 Christmas special until the show's end.; Audience of 5.81m – 34th most watched programme of the week.
Clegg, Alvin, Billy and Entwistle play a trick on Truly to make him think his ex-wife "The former Mrs Truelove" is keen to get in touch with him and visit.

== DVD release ==
The box set for series twenty-five was released by Universal Playback in September 2014, mislabelled as a box set for series 25 & 26.

The Complete Series 25 & 26
Set Details
- 22 episodes
- 4-disc set
- Language: English
Release Date
Region 2
29 September 2014
