= Last of the Summer Wine series 7 =

Last of the Summer Wine
- Series 7
- Last of the Summer Wine Series 7 & 8 DVD
- No. of episodes: 8

Release
- Original network: BBC1
- Original release: 25 December 1982 – 27 December 1983

Additional information
- Filming dates: Series 7: 1982; Christmas specials: 1982, 1983

Season chronology
- ← Previous; 6 Next → 8

The seventh series of Last of the Summer Wine originally aired on BBC1 between 25 December 1982 and 27 December 1983. All episodes were written by Roy Clarke, and produced and directed by Sydney Lotterby, except for "Getting Sam Home", which is produced and directed by Alan J.W. Bell.

The seventh series was released on DVD in region 2 as a combined box set with series 8 on 3 March 2008.

== Outline ==
The trio in this series consisted of Compo (Bill Owen), Clegg (Peter Sallis) and Foggy (Brian Wilde). This series marked the first appearance of PC Cooper (1983, 1988–2010) and the last appearance of Sid (1973–1983).

== Episodes ==
| No. overall | No. in series | Title | Original release date | Notes |
|---|---|---|---|---|
| 47 | Christmas–Special | "All Mod Conned" | 25 December 1982 | The runtime for this episode is slightly more than 33 minutes.; Included on the Series 7 & 8 boxset |
Deciding to abandon the commercialised side of Christmas, Foggy books a caravan for the trio.
| 48 | 1 | "The Frozen Turkey Man" | 30 January 1983 | This episode had ratings of 15.95 million viewers, making it the 5th most watched programme of 1983. |
Compo and Clegg decide that Foggy needs a woman, and they persuade a barmaid that he is a millionaire.
| 49 | 2 | "The White Man's Grave" | 6 February 1983 | - |
Deciding that Wally needs a break from Nora, the trio decide to swap Clegg with Wally.
| 50 | 3 | "The Waist Land" | 13 February 1983 | Guest appearance of John Barrard as Lapsley. Barrard had previously played Josie's Dad in the 1976 episode "Going to Gordon's Wedding".; Guest appearance of Hugh Lloyd as Alex |
Foggy hits upon a money making idea – selling junk food to people from the local health club.
| 51 | 4 | "Cheering Up Ludovic" | 20 February 1983 | Bryan Pringle guest starred as Ludovic.; Apart from the one scene set in the pub, the rest of the episode is shot entirely on location and entirely on film. |
Ludovic has bought a tatty old van, but is too drunk to drive it. So it's up to Clegg to test drive it.
| 52 | 5 | "The Three Astaires" | 27 February 1983 | Second and final appearance of John Horsley as the local vicar |
Foggy volunteers the trio to help out at a church concert party, but Compo can't resist trying on a suit of armour
| 53 | 6 | "The Arts of Concealment" | 6 March 1983 | The cyclists belong to the Yorkshire Terrier Cycle Collective. |
Foggy demonstrates his army camouflage techniques, to the dismay of a group of cyclists.
| 54 | Christmas Special | "Getting Sam Home" | 27 December 1983 | This was a 90-minute special, a film made for television.; This was the first episode to have no laughter track.; Based upon Roy Clarke's Last of the Summer Wine novel (1974). The novel actually featured the character of Cyril Blamire, but was rewritten for the 1983 reprint to feature Foggy instead.; The title "Getting Sam Home" is not given onscreen, but is used in all reference books and television listings.; First and only appearance of Sam; Guest appearance of Lynda Baron as Lily Bless'er; This episode marked the final appearance of Sid. John Comer's voice was affected by illness, so his lines were dubbed by actor Tony Melody. Comer died 6 weeks after the broadcast, and Tony Melody would later appear as a landlord in the 2003 episode "The Second Husband and the Showgirls".; This is the second time the title music, with added lyrics, was sung by The Mike Sammes Singers.; This episode marked the first appearance of Ken Kitson playing a policeman.; David Williams makes his first of three appearances as Norris Fairburn. He would reprise his role in the following series episode "Who's Looking After the Cafe, Then?" as well as "Will Stella Find True Love with Norris Fairburn?" in the 2009 series 26 years later.; The location of Norris Fairburn’s house is on the same street as Lily Bless’er’s house, though several doors down and on the opposite side.; Included on the Series 7 & 8 boxset; In 2023, the original film negatives were scanned in High Definition 1080i and the restored television film was broadcast for the first time in HD on BBC Four on Christmas Eve 2023. |
The lads visit Sam in hospital, and agree to his request that he wants to spend one last night with his "other woman", Lily Bless'er. Unfortunately, while at Lily's, Sam dies. It's up to Foggy, Compo, Clegg and Sid to get him back home in such a way that his wife Sybil thinks he died in his own bed. But that's not the end of their troubles, and worse still, Ivy is determined to find out what the four are up to.

== DVD release ==
The box set for series 7 and 8 was released by Universal Playback in March 2008.

The Complete Series 7 & 8
Set Details
- 15 episodes
- 3-disc set
- Language: English
Release Date
Region 2
3 March 2008
