= Last of the Summer Wine series 10 =

Last of the Summer Wine
- Series 10
- No. of episodes: 7

Release
- Original network: BBC1
- Original release: 16 October – 24 December 1988

Additional information
- Filming dates: Series 10: 1988; Christmas special: 1988

Season chronology
- ← Previous; 9 Next → 11

The tenth series of Last of the Summer Wine aired on BBC1 in 1988. All of the episodes were written by Roy Clarke, and produced and directed by Alan J. W. Bell.

== Characters ==
The trio in this series consisted of Compo (Bill Owen), Clegg (Peter Sallis) and Seymour (Michael Aldridge). This series marked the first appearances of Smiler Hemingway (1988, 1990–2007), PC Walsh (1988–1989, 2004–2010) and Auntie Wainwright (1988–1989, 1992–2010).

== Episodes ==
No. overall	No. in series	Title	Original release date	Notes
77	1	"The Experiment"	16 October 1988	This was the first episode to be broadcast on PBS stations in the 1990s, including on WQEX.; This episode marks the first appearance of the women's coffee morning.
Compo wonders why blood rushes to your head when you're upside down. Seymour sets up an experiment to explain.
78	2	"The Treasure of the Deep"	23 October 1988	Filming took place, again, near the Standedge Tunnels.
After finding a valuable-looking object in the canal, Seymour is convinced it's part of robbers' swag, and sets out to recover the rest of the stolen items.
79	3	"Dancing Feet"	30 October 1988	The incidental music heard during the trio's walk was previously used in the film A Bridge Too Far (1977).; Don Henderson guest stars as Charlie the grocer.
Compo has hard skin on his feet, and in desperation, he buys a herbal remedy from a gypsy.
80	4	"Smiler is in hospital, and missing his beloved dog. The trio attempt to smuggle her into the hospital to visit him."	6 November 1988	This episode marks the first appearance of Stephen Lewis as Clem "Smiler" Hemmingway (although the nickname "Smiler" is not used in the episode). Originally intended to be his only appearance, Lewis would return just two years later in series 12 owing to his popularity.
81	5	"Downhill Racer"	13 November 1988	First appearance of Louis Emerick as PC Walsh
Seymour would love to go skiing, but in the absence of snow, he decides they should try sliding downhill on dinner trays.
82	6	"The Day of the Welsh Ferret"	20 November 1988	-
The trio go to a funeral, but Compo insists on bringing along a pet ferret.
83	4	"Crums"	24 December 1988	60-minute special; This special features a guest appearance by Jean Alexander, marking the first appearance of Auntie Wainwright.; This episode was watched by 17.10 million viewers, making it the 7th most watched program of 1988.; Included on the series 11 & 12 boxset.; Jim Bowen guest stars for the first time.; The title "Crums" is, according to dialogue in this episode, an acronym, which stands for the "Christmas Resistance Underground Movement".; This episode also featured the guest appearance of Yvette Fielding as Fran (Milburn's girlfriend), although Milburn himself didn't actually appear, as actor Jonathan Linsley left the series the year before. Fielding was visiting filming of the episode for Blue Peter, of which she was co-host at the time, and a report on her visit and her part in the episode was shown on Blue Peter five days prior to this episode's broadcast, on Monday 19th December 1988.; Cliff Richard's "Mistletoe and Wine" can be heard in the background during the pub scene, which was also the Christmas No.1 that year.; Wally Batty's death is acknowledged for the first time in this episode following the death of Joe Gladwin the year before.
It's Christmas 1988, and Barry intends to buy Glenda a water bed, the trio dress as Father Christmases for a charity event, and Howard looks for someone to guard Auntie Wainwright's shop.

== DVD release ==
The box set for series nine was released by Universal Playback in May 2008, mislabelled as a box set for series 9 & 10. In the Complete Collection set, the 6 regular episodes of Series 10 are found on the disc labelled "Series 11 & 12 DVD 1". The DVD's main menu is mislabelled as "Series 11". The Christmas Special Crums is found on the disc labelled "Series 11 & 12 DVD 3".

The Complete Series 9 & 10
Set Details
- 15 episodes
- 3-disc set
- Language: English
Release Date
Region 2
5 May 2008
