= Last of the Summer Wine series 26 =

Last of the Summer Wine
- Series 26
- No. of episodes: 11

Release
- Original network: BBC One
- Original release: 19 December 2004 – 29 May 2005

Additional information
- Filming dates: Christmas special: 2004; Series 26: 2004

Season chronology
- ← Previous; 25 Next → 27

The twenty-sixth series of Last of the Summer Wine aired on BBC One from December 2004 to May 2005. All of the episodes were written by Roy Clarke, and produced and directed by Alan J. W. Bell.

== Characters ==
The quartet in this series consisted of Clegg (Peter Sallis), Truly (Frank Thornton), Billy (Keith Clifford) and Alvin (Brian Murphy). PC Walsh (1988–1989, 2004–2010) returned after 15 years and Ros Utterthwaite (2000–2005) appeared for the last time.

== Episodes ==
No. overall	No. in series	Title	Original release date	Notes
236	Christmas–Special	"Variations on a Theme of the Widow Winstanley"	19 December 2004	Norman Wisdom makes his seventh and final guest appearance as Billy Ingleton.; Audience of 5.29m – 40th most watched programme of the week.; Louis Emerick returns as PC Walsh after an absence of 15 years following the death of Tony Capstick.
Clegg is writing his memoirs, but he is having trouble remember people's names, particularly a tallish girl from school with blonde pigtails who liked black licorice. Ivy and Nora identify the girl as Audrey Needham, now the Widow Winstanley. Truly, Alvin, and Billy Hardcastle scheme to match the notoriously woman-shy Clegg up with the widow. When she shows up at his door, he takes refuge at a poetry reading, disguised as Father Christmas. Meanwhile, Auntie Wainwright, Smiler, and Tom attempt to retrieve a mahogany bedroom set that Auntie Wainwright sold to a man who has died, but Entwistle's truck is not up to the job.
237	1	"The Swan Man of Ilkley"	13 March 2005	Guest appearances (for the first time) of Bobby Ball and Tommy Cannon.; The trio becomes a quartet from this episode till the next series.; Audience of 5.65m – 38th most watched programme of the week.
After Clegg, Truly, Billy and Alvin encounter a stranger planning to float to Ilkley using an inflatable swan, it's up to Entwistle to ensure the man completes his journey.
238	2	"Watching the Clock"	20 March 2005	Audience of 4.55m – 54th most watched programme of the week.
Clegg climbs an old tree to prove that the town clock from a nearby village can be seen from its height, and a delivery to the church hall gets a bit out of control.
239	3	"Has Anyone Seen a Peruvian Wart?"	27 March 2005	Guest appearance of Roy Barraclough.; Second appearance of Billy's house and second time Billy's wife is heard talking.; Audience of 4.53m – 52nd most watched programme of the week.
Nora Batty finds herself the target of a notorious womaniser after she garners his attention with her baked goods.
240	4	"Hermione (The Short Course)"	10 April 2005	Tony Capstick's character, 2nd policeman, is referred to as having been transferred to Huddersfield.
A "Do Not Disturb" sign on Clegg's door rouses curiosity and worry among his friends; Smiler finds himself yearning for a lost love.
241	5	"Who's That Mouse in the Poetry Group?"	17 April 2005	Audience of 5m – 38th most watched programme of the week.; Jess Conrad makes an appearance as a walker.
In an attempt to improve his appeal, Smiler transforms himself into an "intellectual" to both Marina's delight and Howard's chagrin.
242	6	"Available for Weddings"	24 April 2005	Audience of 4.73m – 39th most watched programme of the week.
After Clegg breaks his leg attempting a steep hill, the Yorkshire countryside becomes a test track for Truly's experimental studded bicycle tyres.
243	7	"The McDonaghs of Jamieson Street"	1 May 2005	Audience of 3.9m – 59th most watched programme of the week.; Dora Bryan is billed in the opening credits but does not appear.
When Smiler tells the boys about the "girl who got away", they venture out to track her down and play Cupid.
244	8	"The Afterthoughts of a Co-op Manager"	8 May 2005	Audience of 4.93m – 34th most watched programme of the week.
Truly heads a search for a manager Clegg worked under in his youth, finding that even the tyrannous can harbour virtue.
245	9	"Lot No. 8"	15 May 2005	-
Auntie Wainwright acquires a mystery parcel at an auction and sends Tom and Smiler to pick it up; when the items in question turn out to be coffins, the men try to think of other marketable uses for them.
246	10	"Little Orphan Howard"	29 May 2005	Final appearance of Roz Utterthwaite.; Audience of 3.67m – 59th most watched programme of the week.
While Alvin endeavours to become the world's greatest kite flyer, Howard falls into a depression after Clegg devilishly convinces him that he's an orphan.

== DVD release ==
The box set for series twenty-six was released by Universal Playback in October 2015, mislabelled as a box set for series 27 & 28.

The Complete Series 27 & 28
Set Details
- 21 episodes
- 4-disc set
- Language: English
Release Date
Region 2
5 October 2015
