= Last of the Summer Wine series 24 =

Last of the Summer Wine
- Series 24
- No. of episodes: 11

Release
- Original network: BBC One
- Original release: 29 December 2002 – 16 March 2003

Additional information
- Filming dates: Christmas special: 2002; Series 24: 2002

Season chronology
- ← Previous; 23 Next → 25

The twenty-fourth series of Last of the Summer Wine aired on BBC One. All of the episodes were written by Roy Clarke, and produced and directed by Alan J. W. Bell.

== Characters ==
The trio in this series consisted of Clegg (Peter Sallis), Truly (Frank Thornton) and Billy (Keith Clifford). Entwistle (2002–2010), Alvin Smedley (2003–2010) and Miss Davenport (2003–2010) all appear for the first time, and Nora Batty (1973–2001, 2003–2008) returns. Edie Pegden (1986–2003) appears for the final time.

== Episodes ==
No. overall	No. in series	Title	Original release date	Notes
214	Christmas–Special	"A Musical Passing for a Miserable Muscroft"	29 December 2002	Nora Batty returns, having been absent since the series 22 episode "The Coming of the Beast".; Norman Wisdom makes his fifth guest appearance as Billy Ingleton.; First small appearance of Entwistle (Burt Kwouk), although his introduction to the other characters occurs in the next series.; The closing theme is played on organ by Phil Kelsall recorded at Tower Ballroom.; Audience of 6.27m – 44th most watched programme of the week.
Billy Ingleton has acquired a mobile pipe organ, the use of which the ladies feel appropriate for a charity pageant. Meanwhile, isn't anyone going to nasty old Muscroft's funeral?
215	1	"The Lair of the Cat Creature"	5 January 2003	First appearance of Brian Murphy as Alvin Smedley (then a guest star).; Audience of 6.67m – 33rd most watched programme of the week.
A new adventurer lands in town, eager to make a name for himself; luckily for him, the trio has in mind a heroic test of mettle.
216	2	"Ancient Eastern Wisdom – An Introduction"	12 January 2003	This episode introduces Entwistle (Burt Kwouk), despite his previously appearing in the 2002 Christmas special.; Katherine Kelly (Becky McDonald in Coronation Street) appears as Sharlene, a shop assistant with Marina.; Audience of 5.76m – 53rd most watched programme of the week.
Enthralled by a book of fiction, Howard begins emulating its hero; meanwhile, Truly and Clegg meet an inscrutable bearer of ancient Eastern wisdom whom they recruit to help Tom deal with the repo man.
217	3	"A Pick-Up of the Later Ming Dynasty"	19 January 2003	Audience of 6.17m – 50th most watched programme of the week.
After helping Entwistle fix his truck, the trio are recruited to lay hands on Smiler's cart.
218	4	"The Secret Birthday of Norman Clegg"	26 January 2003	Audience of 6.26m – 33rd most watched programme of the week.
Clegg wants to celebrate his birthday as quietly as possible, so he goes to pieces when everybody in the village is dressed for a celebration.
219	5	"In Which Gavin Hinchcliffe Loses the Gulf Stream"	2 February 2003	Guest appearance of Josephine Tewson (Keeping Up Appearances) as Miss Davenport before becoming a regular cast member in the 2003 Christmas special, "A Short Blast of Fred Astaire".; Guest appearance of Bernard Cribbins as Gavin Hinchcliffe.; Audience of 6.38m – 44th most watched programme of the week.
An old schoolmate's preparations for global warming are hampered by a drunk girlfriend and one very nervous driver.
220	6	"The Miraculous Curing of Old Goff Helliwell"	9 February 2003	Guest appearance of Henry McGee from The Benny Hill Show as Goff Helliwell.; Audience of 6.10m – 37th most watched programme of the week.
Clegg, Truly and Billy need to put a spark back in the life of an old chum.
221	7	"The Frenchies Are Coming"	23 February 2003	Audience of 5.89m – 43rd most watched programme of the week.
Billy assembles a band of archers to defend against French invaders, and Pearl finds a way to keep tabs on Howard's comings and goings.
222	8	"The Man Who Invented Yorkshire Funny Stuff"	2 March 2003	Audience of 6.76m – 32nd most watched programme of the week.
The trio are on the hunt for a green-fingered man whose reputation as a ladies' man has bred contempt among his old flames.
223	9	"The Second Husband and the Showgirls"	9 March 2003	Guest appearance of William Lucas as Norris Leland.; Audience of 6.07m – 42nd most watched programme of the week.; Tony Melody, who plays a landlord, had previously dubbed the voice of Sid in the 90-minute Christmas special "Getting Sam Home", after John Comer's voice was badly affected by cancer twenty years earlier.
Curiosity abounds when the new husband of the former Mrs. Truelove arrives in town.
224	10	"All of a Florrie"	16 March 2003	Final appearance of Edie. Thora Hird died the day before the broadcast of this episode.; Alvin Smedley (Brian Murphy) becomes a regular character. He would later join the trio in series 26 in 2005, thus making it a quartet and remain until the show's end in 2010.; Guest appearance of Jeanne Mockford as Florrie.
Everyone lends a hand in helping Truly rid himself of an old next-door neighbour with misguided affections.

== DVD release ==
The box set for series twenty-four was released by Universal Playback in September 2014, mislabelled as a box set for series 25 & 26.

The Complete Series 25 & 26
Set Details
- 22 episodes
- 4-disc set
- Language: English
Release Date
Region 2
29 September 2014
