= Last of the Summer Wine series 12 =

Last of the Summer Wine
- Series 12
- No. of episodes: 11

Release
- Original network: BBC1
- Original release: 2 September – 27 December 1990

Additional information
- Filming dates: Series 12: 1990; Christmas special: 1990

Season chronology
- ← Previous; 11 Next → 13

The twelfth series of Last of the Summer Wine aired on BBC1. All of the episodes were written by Roy Clarke, and produced and directed by Alan J. W. Bell.

With the departure of Michael Aldridge, who had left to nurse his ill wife, the character of Foggy Dewhurst returned to the fold.

== Characters ==
The trio in this series consisted of Compo (Bill Owen), Clegg (Peter Sallis) and Foggy (Brian Wilde), the latter of which returned in the first episode. Seymour (Michael Aldridge) appeared briefly and for the final time in "Return of the Warrior". Barry Wilkinson (1986–1990, 1996–2010) also had his final appearance this series.

== Episodes ==
No. overall	No. in series	Title	Original release date	Notes
92	1	"Return of the Warrior"	2 September 1990	Final appearance of Seymour Utterthwaite. Aldridge appears in the first five minutes only, before Seymour leaves town on a bus to take up a new teaching post.; Michael Aldridge left the show to look after his wife who was in the early stages of dementia, even though Aldridge (as well as director Alan J.W. Bell and the rest of the cast and crew) was devastated to leave a part he adored.; Foggy returns, having been absent since series 8 in 1985.; First episode featuring two of the "third men", but they never meet.; When Compo and Clegg inform Seymour that the caning of children is now illegal, Seymour is clearly disappointed by this news, despite already being aware of the fact, having mentioned it himself in the 1987 feature-length episode Big Day at Dream Acres.; Despite his new post being only an hour away, Seymour is never seen again.
Compo and Clegg see Seymour off, ready to take up a post of headmaster, and ponder what they will do with their lives now he has gone; they just keep missing a returning Foggy, until they finally bump into him.
93	2	"Come In, Sunray Major"	9 September 1990	-
After a miscommunication leads to Foggy getting split up from Compo and Clegg while out walking, he comes up with an idea – portable radios.
94	3	"The Charity Balls"	16 September 1990	This episode includes the second and final appearance of Bert Parnaby as Jack Harry Teesdale.
Compo, Clegg, Foggy and Howard take part in sponsored football dribble for charity.
95	4	"Walking Stiff Can Make You Famous"	23 September 1990	Rare appearance of Foggy's house.; The Cycle Polo invented by Foggy in this episode is actually a real sport, invented by Richard J. Mecredy in Ireland in 1891.
Foggy is tired of not receiving what he perceives as sufficient gravitas for his position and dreams up a suitably high-profile game befitting his status within the community: bicycle polo.
96	5	"That's Not Captain Zero"	30 September 1990	Guest appearance of Trevor Peacock (Captain Zero).; The last appearances of Clegg and Howard's original respective homes.
After meeting Captain Zero, the human cannonball, the trio take him to the pub while his van is fixed. Unfortunately, when he gets arrested for being drunk, it is up to Compo to take his place.
97	6	"Das (Welly) Boot"	7 October 1990	Clegg and Howard move into new homes, still as next-door neighbours. They would remain there for the rest of the series, until the show's end.; Episode title is a spoof on the film Das Boot.
Foggy decides to restore an old boat, and Compo knows who he wants to take on the first trip...Nora Batty, but how can they lure her on board with him? Foggy has a plan yet again.
98	7	"The Empire That Foggy Nearly Built"	14 October 1990	Cameo appearance of James Thackeray (Motor Cyclist)
After seeing an argument over a parking space, Foggy decides that there must be money to be made out of car parking.
99	8	"The Last Surviving Maurice Chevalier Impression"	21 October 1990	Guest featuring a then injury-recovering Gorden Kaye (of 'Allo 'Allo! fame) as Maynard Lavery
In another attempt to woo Nora Batty, Compo decides to go on a local television programme with his Maurice Chevalier impression, but unfortunately decides it's also a good idea to bring along his lucky ferret.
100	9	"Roll On"	28 October 1990	Cameo appearance of Rachel Bell (Barmaid). She would later play Hyacinth Bucket in the touring version of another Roy Clarke series, Keeping Up Appearances.; Cameo appearance of Max Harvey (Customer).
The trio train for a barrel-rolling event.
101	10	"A Landlady For Smiler"	4 November 1990	Guest appearance of Chris Breeze.; Second guest appearance of Smiler before he becomes a regular from 1991 until 2007.
The lads do their best to find a new place to live for a returning Smiler, without much luck, until they strike upon the idea of the widow Nora Batty, though Compo is not too keen for another man to live with "his bird".
102	Christmas–Special	"Barry's Christmas"	27 December 1990	There is no on-screen title for this episode.; Uniquely, the open and close of this episode feature a fade to sepia.; Last appearance of Barry, who returns six years later in the 1996 Christmas special, "Extra! Extra!", as Mike Grady left to pursue other TV projects of work at the time.; This was the last episode to use 16mm film for outdoor scenes until series 14. The next series was shot entirely on video tape.
It's Christmas 1990, and Glenda's so upset because Barry didn't come home the night before. The trio find him dressed as Santa Claus, under a table in the local pub

== DVD release ==
The box set for series twelve was released by Universal Playback in December 2008, mislabelled as a box set for series 13 & 14.

The Complete Series 13 & 14
Set Details
- 15 episodes
- 3-disc set
- Language: English
Release Date
Region 2
26 December 2008
