= Last of the Summer Wine series 5 =

Last of the Summer Wine
- Series 5
- Last of the Summer Wine Series 5 & 6 DVD
- No. of episodes: 8

Release
- Original network: BBC1
- Original release: 18 September – 27 December 1979

Additional information
- Filming dates: Series 5: 1979; Christmas special: 1979

Season chronology
- ← Previous; 4 Next → 6

The fifth series of Last of the Summer Wine originally aired on BBC1 between 18 September and 30 October 1979. All episodes were written by Roy Clarke, and produced and directed by Sydney Lotterby.

The fifth series was something of a departure; it was the first to include multiple two-part episodes and saw an increase in the more physical comedy for which the programme would become more well-known latterly.

The fifth series was released on DVD in region 2 as a combined box set with series 6 on 5 March 2007.

== Characters ==
The trio in this series consisted of Compo (Bill Owen), Clegg (Peter Sallis) and Foggy (Brian Wilde).

== Episodes ==
No. overall	No. in series	Title	Original release date	Notes
31	1	"Full Steam Behind"	18 September 1979	Partly filmed along the Keighley and Worth Valley Railway; Favourite episode of Peter Sallis; Only Compo, Foggy and Clegg from the main cast appear in the episode.; The station seen in the episode is Haworth.
Foggy takes Compo and Clegg to the Keighley and Worth Valley Railway.
32	2	"The Flag & Its Snag"	25 September 1979	Guest appearance of Gordon Gostelow; Part one of a two-parter
Foggy has a plan to erect a huge flag in the hills, but first they'll have to get the flagpole up there.
33	3	"The Flag & Further Snags"	2 October 1979	Guest appearance of Robert Lang, Maggie Ollerenshaw and Stan Richards; Part two of a two-parter
Foggy collects his flag, and achieves his dream...for a little while.
34	4	"Deep in the Heart of Yorkshire"	9 October 1979	-
What are Sid and Wally doing in the woods?
35	5	"Earnshaw Strikes Again"	16 October 1979	Guest appearance of David Ryall; This episode had ratings of 22.2 million viewers, making it the most watched episode of Last of the Summer Wine.
Foggy upsets the others by denying the existence of the ancient Yorkshire gods.
36	6	"Here We Go into the Wild Blue Yonder"	23 October 1979	Guest appearance of John Dair; Part one of a two-parter
Compo wants to impress Nora by taking up hang-gliding, so the trio ask Wally to build a hang-glider for them.
37	7	"Here We Go Again into the Wild Blue Yonder"	30 October 1979	Guest appearance of Chris Webb; Part two of a two-parter
Wally has finished the hang-glider and it's ready to test.
38	Christmas–Special	"And a Dewhurst Up a Fir Tree"	27 December 1979	Guest appearance of Juliet Cooke; Included on Series 5 & 6 Boxset
Foggy decides to start his Christmas shopping early, but is surprised that the shops aren't selling Christmas cards in the summer. He then takes up an offer of buying some Christmas trees.

== DVD release ==
The box set for series 5 and 6 was released by Universal Playback in March 2007.

The Complete Series 5 & 6
Set Details
- 17 episodes
- 3-disc set
- Language: English
Release Date
Region 2
5 March 2007

== Production ==
The BBC decided not to commission the series in 1978, due to the series creator Roy Clarke working on Open All Hours, and the series main cast member was to busy working on Leave it to Charlie.
