= Last of the Summer Wine series 1 =

Last of the Summer Wine
- Season 1
- Last of the Summer Wine Series 1 & 2 DVD
- No. of episodes: 6

Release
- Original network: BBC1
- Original release: Pilot: 4 January 1973; Series: 12 November 1973–17 December 1973

Additional information
- Filming dates: Pilot: 1972; Series 1: 1973

Season chronology
- Next → 2

The first series of Last of the Summer Wine originally aired on BBC1 between 4 January 1973 and 17 December 1973. All episodes were written by Roy Clarke, and produced and directed by James Gilbert.

The pilot episode, alternatively known as "The Last of the Summer Wine" and "Of Funerals and Fish", originally premiered on the BBC's Comedy Playhouse on 4 January 1973. "The Last of the Summer Wine" was the first episode of that show's thirteenth series. The pilot received a positive enough reaction that the BBC ordered a full series of episodes, premiering on 12 November 1973.

== Outline ==
The trio in this series consisted of:

Actor	Role
Michael Bates	Blamire
Bill Owen	Compo
Peter Sallis	Clegg

== First appearances ==
- Compo Simmonite (1973–2000)
- Norman Clegg (1973–2010)
- Cyril Blamire (1973–1975)
- Sid (1973–1983)
- Ivy (1973–2010)
- Nora Batty (1973–2001, 2003–2008)

== Episodes ==
No.	Title	Directed by	Written by	Original release date
Comedy Playhouse pilot
1	"Of Funerals and Fish"	James Gilbert	Roy Clarke	4 January 1973
Blamire, Compo and Clegg go around town, discussing life and death, watching their fellow townspeople with their problems.
Regular series
2	"Short Back and Palais Glide"	James Gilbert	Roy Clarke	12 November 1973
At the library, Clegg and Blamire turn Compo upside down to rid him of evil spirits and are thrown out by Mr Wainwright.
3	"Inventor of the Forty Foot Ferret"	James Gilbert	Roy Clarke	19 November 1973
Blamire tries to persuade atheist Compo to visit church, challenging Compo to sit there for five minutes without saying anything.
4	"Pâté and Chips"	James Gilbert	Roy Clarke	26 November 1973
The trio decide to visit a local stately home with Compo's nephew, Chip, and his family.
5	"Spring Fever"	James Gilbert	Roy Clarke	3 December 1973
Nora Batty is panic-stricken when Compo cleans his house rather than go to the library with Clegg and Blamire.
6	"The New Mobile Trio"	James Gilbert	Roy Clarke	10 December 1973
Clegg buys a car from a man named Walter who attempted to teach a dog how to ride a bicycle.
7	"Hail Smiling Morn or Thereabouts"	James Gilbert	Roy Clarke	17 December 1973
Blamire decides to take up photography and Clegg suggests they camp out and photograph the sunrise. On the UK DVD release, the title of this episode is both shortened and misspelled on the menu system as ‘Hail Smiling Moron’.

== DVD release ==
The first and second series were released by Universal Playback as a combined box set in September 2002. The pilot episode is not included and some episodes have been altered from their original broadcast, prompting criticism from the show's fan base; however, a re-release of the box set in 2011 had the altered episodes restored to original episodes, but the pilot was still not included. The pilot episode was released on the final boxset series 31 & 32 as an extra on disc four on 15 August 2016.

The Complete Series 1 & 2
Set Details
- 13 episodes
- 4-disc set
- Language: English
Release Date
Region 2
2 September 2002
