= Last of the Summer Wine series 29 =

Last of the Summer Wine
- Series 29
- No. of episodes: 11

Release
- Original network: BBC One
- Original release: 22 June – 31 August 2008

Additional information
- Filming dates: Series 29: 2007

Season chronology
- ← Previous; 28 Next → 30

The twenty-ninth series of Last of the Summer Wine aired on BBC One from 22 June to 31 August 2008. All of the episodes were written by Roy Clarke, and produced and directed by Alan J. W. Bell.

== Characters ==
The trio in this series consisted of Clegg (Peter Sallis), Truly (Frank Thornton) and Alvin (Brian Murphy). Nora Batty (1973–2001, 2003–2008) made her final appearance due to the actress' death.

== Episodes ==
No. overall	No. in series	Title	Original release date	Notes
268	1	"Enter the Finger"	22 June 2008	Guest appearance of Brian Conley.; This episode was dedicated to Brian Wilde, who died earlier that year.; Audience of 3.39m – 50th most watched programme of the week.
Barry's fitness-mad neighbour annoyingly outshines him in all things physical. When it comes to karate, however, Barry has friends who can help him even the balance.
269	2	"Will the Genuine Racer Please Stand Up?"	29 June 2008	-
Howard decides to disguise himself from Pearl but discovers it is not as easy as he thought.
270	3	"A Short Introduction to Cooper's Rules"	6 July 2008	Guest appearance of Nicholas Smith.; A very rare instance of an episode being shown on BBC Two owing to a late change in listings because of the late finish of the men's final of the 2008 Wimbledon Championships. (The only other instance of the show being on BBC Two was late one night in 1996, when the first episode was shown as part of the "Pilot Paradise" strand.); This episode is unique in that it revolves almost entirely around PCs Cooper and Walsh, who are usually secondary characters. Clegg and Truly are barely seen in this episode.; PCs Cooper and Walsh are finally given names after years of being referred to as "1st Policeman" and "2nd Policeman".; 1.75 million viewers watched this episode.
Just as PCs Cooper and Walsh master the art of fighting crime from the rear, Barry spoils it all by taking a retired vicar out for the day.
271	4	"Is Jeremy Quite Safe?"	13 July 2008	Guest appearance of John Challis.; Episode shown at 5:05 pm. This was probably the earliest start time for a first-run episode of in the series' entire run. The following repeat of Doctor Who failed to reach the top 70 programmes that week.
A retired jewel thief regales Marina and Miss Davenport with fanciful stories of his past exploits in the South of France. When Auntie Wainwright finds an old safe without a key, who better to open it?
272	5	"All That Glitters Is Not Elvis"	20 July 2008	Guest appearances of Kenneth Cope and Maggie Ollerenshaw. They also appeared in the 1997 episode "The Love Mobile".
When Alvin and Entwistle see Lance trying to convince his wife that Elvis is still alive, they feel a duty to help the King make an appearance.
273	6	"Eva's Back in Town"	27 July 2008	Guest appearance of Shirley Anne Field.
Eva, an old acquaintance of Alvin's makes an appearance, and proves to be just the woman to make Howard's life more complicated.
274	7	"In Which Romance Isn't Dead – Just Incompetent"	3 August 2008	Guest appearance of Tyler Butterworth, son of Carry On actor Peter Butterworth, and actress and impersonator Janet Brown.
Barry has a lonely neighbour on his hands and takes it upon himself to find him a girlfriend. But who, and how? Meanwhile, Howard is desperate for Pearl to find him attractive again.
275	8	"The Mischievous Tinkle in Howard's Eyes"	10 August 2008	-
Howard discovers there are better ways than the mobile phone to contact 'certain acquaintances', and quite openly, too – morris dancing bells. Elsewhere, Alvin and Entwistle have fun on rollerskates.
276	9	"Of Passion and Pizza"	17 August 2008	Guest appearance of Philip Fox.; This episode has an unusual self-referential moment in which Tom off-handedly mentions that Smiler has disappeared.
Mervyn is deeply in love with 'Her' at the pizza take-away, but lacking the courage to tell her himself, he makes the mistake of letting Entwistle and Alvin try to bring them together.
277	10	"It's Never Ten Years"	24 August 2008	The only episode to be a "clip show", featuring Bill Owen.; New footage involves only three characters – Alvin, Clegg and Truly. Compo and Nora appear in clips only.; Although the title "It's Never Ten Years" refers to ten years since Compo's death, it is actually not ten years since either the character or the actor died – Compo's death occurred in the episode "Elegy for Fallen Wellies", broadcast on 23 April 2000 (eight years earlier), and Bill Owen died on 12 July 1999 (nine years earlier).; "Wheelies", "Tarzan of the Towpath" and "Last Post & Pigeon" clips are featured.
Clegg and Truly reminisce fondly about their old friend Compo, who suffered at the hands of Nora Batty – and them, thus teaching Alvin a thing or two.
278	11	"Get Out of That, Then"	31 August 2008	Guest appearances of Barbara Young, Tommy Cannon and Bobby Ball (the third and final time for Cannon and Ball).; Barbara Young makes a guest appearance as Florrie, before returning in series 30 as the regular character of Stella.; This episode marks the final appearance of Nora Batty owing to the death of Kathy Staff. Staff was unable to appear in series 30 owing to ill health, and died four months after this episode was broadcast.; This also marks the final episode to feature Clegg and Truly as part of the main trio owing to insurance costs. They become secondary characters in series 30 and series 31.; From this episode until the end of the series, the programme is credited as BBC Productions.; Audience of 4.8m – 27th most watched programme of the week. A later time slot seems to have helped the ratings for this episode to return to previous levels.
Lenny, heavily chained, is determined that he has a showbusiness future as an escapologist. Sidekick Cliff is not as enthusiastic.

== DVD release ==
The box set for series twenty-nine was released by Universal Playback in May 2016, mislabelled as a box set for series 29 & 30.

The Complete Series 29 & 30
Set Details
- 21 episodes
- 4-disc set
- Language: English
Release Date
Region 2
16 May 2016
