= Last of the Summer Wine series 17 =

Last of the Summer Wine
- Series 17
- No. of episodes: 11

Release
- Original network: BBC1
- Original release: 3 September – 25 December 1995

Additional information
- Filming dates: Series 17: 1995; Christmas special: 1995

Season chronology
- ← Previous; 16 Next → 18

The seventeenth series of Last of the Summer Wine was broadcast on BBC1. All of the episodes were written by Roy Clarke, and produced and directed by Alan J. W. Bell.

== Characters ==
The trio in this series consisted of Compo (Bill Owen), Clegg (Peter Sallis) and Foggy (Brian Wilde).

== Episodes ==
No. overall	No. in series	Title	Original release date	Notes
139	1	"Leaving Home Forever, or Till Teatime"	3 September 1995	Repeat broadcasts have the 1997 BBC corporate logo at the end.
This time it's for real: Howard's had enough of Pearl and decides to leave home forever, although the lipstick she finds on his collar may have something to do with it. Either way, he desperately wants to return home by teatime in order to enjoy Pearl's excellent steak and kidney pie – can Foggy come up with a plan to help him?
140	2	"Bicycle Bonanza"	10 September 1995	Reversion to earlier bright yellow opening and closing credits.; Cameo appearance of Lois Laurel (daughter of Stan Laurel), during which a snippet of the Cuckoo Waltz can be heard in the incidental music.
The trio hire some bicycles from Auntie Wainwright and have an "off-road" ride through the hills. Meanwhile, Smiler risks his life to give out flyers advertising Auntie Wainwright's new "Bonanza Bicycle Sale".
141	3	"The Glamour of the Uniform"	17 September 1995	Guest appearance of Brian Rawlinson.; Features later opening and closing credits but in yellow, not white.; Repeat broadcasts have the later 1997 BBC corporate logo at the end.
When Marina's affections turn to a traffic warden, and boyhood bully, Howard decides to leave home to join the French Foreign Legion, even going so far as to wear the relevant uniform. Foggy takes Howard under his wing to help him win her back.
142	4	"The First Human Being to Ride t Hill"	24 September 1995	Features the later white opening and closing credits.; Repeat broadcasts have the later 1997 BBC corporate logo at the end.
Pearl has confiscated Howard's bicycle, so Wesley builds him a new "secret" one which is put through its paces by Compo and later disguised
143	5	"Captain Clutterbuck's Treasure"	1 October 1995	Guest appearance of Ron Moody.; Yellow filmic-style credits with earlier BBC corporate logo at end.
The trio meet Lieutenant Commander Willoughby who tells them all about the famous Yorkshire pirate, Captain Clutterbuck. The trio then buy a map from Willoughby so they can find the captain's treasure.
144	6	"Desperate for a Duffield"	8 October 1995	Cameo appearance Roger Grainger.; Yellow filmic-style credits with earlier BBC corporate logo at end.
Compo tries to find one of his old girlfriends, Audrey Duffield (née Mottershaw) but after hearing she moved to Canada, he decides to stay with Nora Batty but not before smartening his appearance in order to impress.
145	7	"The Suit That Turned Left"	15 October 1995	Guest appearance of Kenneth Alan Taylor
The trio meet a man who wants to find the centre of magnetism in Yorkshire which he believes may lead him to be a contender for the Nobel Prize, gathering the locals to create a 'power circle' in the dales.
146	8	"Beware of the Elbow"	22 October 1995	Guest appearance of Norman Rossington.; Filming took place at a level crossing on a disused railway (subject to a strict safety arrangement, explained at the end of the closing credits). The line has since returned to regular use.
The trio meet a man who wants to show the world that he likes fat people and obesity, and that he is dead against slimming and weight loss, to promote which he has a giant inflatable lady.
147	9	"The Thing in Wesley's Shed"	29 October 1995	Stuntman Terry Cade is credited as "Boatman".; Yellow filmic-style credits with earlier BBC corporate logo at end.
Just what is the secret invention that Wesley Pegden has built? The trio try to find out, discovering it to be an entry in the 'Mad Machines' contest as part of the Huddersfield Show.
148	10	"Brushes at Dawn"	5 November 1995	Guest appearances of John Bluthal and Keith Smith.; Yellow filmic-style credits with earlier BBC corporate logo at end.
For the series' finale, Compo is shocked to find Nora Batty in a cupboard with another man, and so he challenges him to a duel which Foggy, naturally, decides should take place on bicycles.
149	Christmas–Special	"A Leg Up for Christmas"	25 December 1995	Hour-long special; Guest appearances of Matthew Kelly and Anita Dobson; Cameo appearances of James Casey and Eli Woods
It's Christmas 1995, and while trying to get himself fit for Christmas, Howard ends up with a broken leg and can't leave the house. The trio then come up with a plan to help him spend time with Marina over the Christmas period.

== DVD release ==
The box set for series seventeen was released by Universal Playback in December 2010, mislabelled as a box set for series 17 & 18.

The Complete Series 17 & 18
Set Details
- 20 episodes
- 4-disc set
- Language: English
Release Date
Region 2
27 December 2010
