= Last of the Summer Wine series 18 =

Last of the Summer Wine
- Series 18
- No. of episodes: 11

Release
- Original network: BBC1
- Original release: 29 December 1996 – 22 June 1997

Additional information
- Filming dates: Christmas special: 1996; Series 18: 1996–1997

Season chronology
- ← Previous; 17 Next → 19

The eighteenth series of Last of the Summer Wine aired on BBC1. All of the episodes were written by Roy Clarke, and produced and directed by Alan J. W. Bell.

== Characters ==
The trio in this series consisted of Compo (Bill Owen), Clegg (Peter Sallis) and Foggy (Brian Wilde). Barry Wilkinson (1986–1990, 1996–2010) returns and Foggy Dewhurst (1976–1985, 1990–1997) appears for the final time.

== Episodes ==
No. overall	No. in series	Title	Original release date	Notes
150	Christmas–Special	"Extra! Extra!"	29 December 1996	Seasonal 43-minute special.; Barry returns, having been absent since the episode Barry's Christmas.; Guest appearance of George Chakiris, and Norman Wisdom as Billy Ingleton.; Features the song Compo Has Gone and Lost His Wellies by Bill Owen, Holme Silver Band and Upperthong School, which was originally released as a single in 1981.
A film crew are making a spoof horror film in the area. When the trio persistently interrupt rehearsals, the director has them recruited as extras, and they soon find they are in good company.
151	1	"The Love Mobile"	20 April 1997	Guest appearance of Kenneth Cope and Maggie Ollerenshaw. These characters also appear in "All That Glitters Is Not Elvis". Maggie Ollerenshaw also appeared in the 1979 episode "The Flag & Further Snags".
Auntie Wainwright sells Smiler a tandem as incentive for him to sell it on; a vindictive, argumentative couple with a mobile lonely hearts office in a caravan break down outside the village. Wesley, Foggy, Clegg and Compo try to assist.
152	2	"A Clean Sweep"	27 April 1997	Guest appearance of Keith Marsh (as the sweep)
An unlucky chimney sweep is in town in an attempt to resurrect an old tradition of having a sweep at weddings and Foggy finds him a good old-fashioned chimney to sweep.
153	3	"The Mysterious C. W. Northrop"	5 May 1997	-
Smiler has a crush on Ivy, but pretends it's C.W. Northrop so Ivy won't know it's him, leading to much discussion around the town before the true identity is finally revealed after confusion reigns.
154	4	"A Double for Howard"	11 May 1997	Guest appearance of Duggie Brown as Vernie Sedgwick
The trio help Howard to find somebody who might look like him from a distance to have a date with Marina. He hopes Pearl will see them and, for once, he won't be in trouble.
155	5	"How to Create a Monster"	18 May 1997	Guest appearance of Elizabeth Estensen (as the Educational Adviser).; This is the first episode in which Barry and Glenda's current home was seen, although at the time, next door hadn't been built.
Foggy decides to train Smiler to help him become more confident and lose his deepest fears which are leaving him unlucky in love. Is the world ready though for Smiler as "Captain Catastrophe"?
156	6	"Deviations with Davenport"	25 May 1997	Guest appearance of Jack Smethurst as Mr. Davenport
The trio meet Mr. Davenport, a hapless hiker who aspires to write a guidebook, but Foggy gets them completely lost; meanwhile, Wesley dreams up a makeshift trailer in lieu of a minibus for the ladies' outing.
157	7	"According to the Prophet Bickerdyke"	1 June 1997	Guest appearances of Tony Millan and Peter Martin.
According to what Clegg refers to as a "passing idiot", the prophet Bickerdyke has predicted that the world is coming to an end. Clegg wonders if this information should be trusted.
158	8	"Next Kiss, Please"	8 June 1997	Cameo appearance of Denis Mawn (Owen's stunt double)
Compo bets Foggy that he can get a kiss, insisting it will willingly be given from Nora Batty. The trio go to Auntie Wainwright's to hire a camera to be sure that Compo will not cheat to win the bet.
159	9	"Destiny and Six Bananas"	15 June 1997	Guest appearance of Joe Belcher; Outtakes were featured in "30 Years of Last of the Summer Wine".
Compo convinces Nora to accompany him to Citizens' Advice on a personal matter while the trio meet a stranger who is exhausted from running through the woodland where he has seen what he believes to be "giant apes". Foggy organizes a safari to try to capture them.
160	10	"A Sidecar Named Desire"	22 June 1997	This episode marks the final appearance of Foggy, as played by Brian Wilde (Foggy is seen in some shots of the next episode, but is played by a body double).; This is the last episode not to have a cold open, although some subsequent episodes don't have it (albeit less frequent).
Compo hires a motorbike and sidecar from Auntie Wainwright and takes Nora Batty for a ride in it in another attempt to woo her and rekindle memories of her late husband, who drove a similar vehicle in earlier episodes.

== DVD release ==
The box set for series eighteen was released by Universal Playback in February 2011, mislabelled as a box set for series 19 & 20.

The Complete Series 19 & 20
Set Details
- 22 episodes
- 4-disc set
- Language: English
Release Date
Region 2
7 February 2011
