= Danny O'Dea =

English actor

- Danny O'Dea as Eli Duckett in Last of the Summer Wine
- Born: Peter Anthony Joseph Daniel Wrenshall; 22 December 1911; Durrington, Sussex, England
- Died: 16 April 2003 (aged 91); Hartshead, Yorkshire, England
- Years active: 1970–2003
- Spouse: Doris Smith (m. 1950; died 2000)
- Children: 2

External image
- Cast of Swansea Grand Theatre's Robin Hood, including Danny O'Dea. Archived from the original on 9 October 2012.

Peter Anthony Joseph Daniel Wrenshall (22 December 1911 – 16 April 2003), better known by his stage name Danny O'Dea, was an English actor.

O'Dea performed alongside some of the biggest names in the business including Arthur Askey, Les Dawson, Dick Emery, John Inman, Victoria Wood and Cilla Black, entering show business at an early age and working until he was 90, later enjoying fame as the short-sighted Eli Duckett in the British sitcom Last of the Summer Wine between 1986 and 2002. His film roles include Paddie, an elderly man in Rita, Sue and Bob Too in 1986. His stage work includes two pantomimes at the Swansea Grand Theatre in Wales: Robin Hood and Puss in Boots.

== Personal life and death ==
He was married to Doris Smith from 1950 until her death on 10 October 2000, the marriage produced one child.

O'Dea died on 16 April 2003 in Hartshead, Yorkshire, aged 91.

== Filmography ==
Year	Title	Role	Notes
1970	Queenie's Castle	Albert	Episode: "Trial by Fury"
1978	All Creatures Great and Small	Tom	Episode: "Faint Hearts"
1979	Ripping Yarns	Man at Gum Factory	Episode: "Golden Gordon"
1983	Bingo!	champion Bingo player	TV movie
1985	Juliet Bravo	Old Man	Episode: "Jobs for the Boys"
1986–2002	Last of the Summer Wine	Eli Duckett	93 episodes, (final appearance)
1987	Rita, Sue and Bob Too	Paddy	
1988	All Creatures Great and Small	Rupe	Episode: "The Pig Man Cometh"
1989	Victoria Wood	Ted	Episode: "The Library"
1990	One Foot in the Grave	Michael	Episode: "The Big Sleep"
1990	Emmerdale	Wilf Henshaw	
1991	Josie		Episode: "Episode No. 1.2"
1997	25 Years of Last of the Summer Wine	Himself	TV documentary
2003	30 Years of Last of the Summer Wine	Himself	TV documentary
