= Ken Kitson =

British actor (born 1946)

Kenneth Kitson
- Born: 1946 (age 79–80); Bradford, West Riding of Yorkshire, England
- Education: East 15 Acting School

Kenneth Kitson (born 1946) is a British actor who has been active on British television since the early 1970s.

== Career ==
After leaving his job as a printer, he trained at East 15 Acting School, and made his screen debut in 1972 as a fight arranger in The Adventures of Barry McKenzie; and later in the 1970s had minor parts in notable TV programmes such as The Howerd Confessions 1976 (ep1), The Professionals (se1 ep3), 1990 ("Hire and Fire") All Creatures Great and Small (series 3, 1979), The Sweeney ("Pay Off"), Minder ("Dreamhouse") and Danger UXB. In 1985 and 1986, he appeared as Cadman in six episodes of Mapp & Lucia.

In 1987, he played the part of Jim Kimble, in Miss Marple the Sleeping Murder episode. In 1988, he played Giant Rumblebuffin in the BBC's adaptation of The Lion, the Witch and the Wardrobe. In addition, he played the landlord of the local pub in Jake's Progress, and was in the 1996 film Brassed Off as a ruthless and violent debt collector. He also had a very small part as "man on bus" in Steve Coogan's Coogan's Run (episode "Get Calf").Dalziel & Pascoe ‘a killing kindness’(Se2ep2)

Kitson also played four minor parts in Coronation Street, starting in the 1970s, (5 September 1977, YouTube) with his most recent role being Mr. Walker in 2005.

He made recurring appearances as the character Inspector Stowe in many episodes across three series of acclaimed show 'The Cops'; his popularity continued making recurring appearances as a policeman (PC Cooper) in Last of the Summer Wine. His first appearance as PC Cooper was in an episode called "Getting Sam Home", Kitson appeared in 88 episodes of the programme between December 1983 and April 2010. He played Sgt. Martin in Ruth Rendell's Inspector Wexford series.
