= Of Funerals and Fish =

- Last of the Summer Wine episode
- Episode no.: Episode 1
- Directed by: James Gilbert
- Written by: Roy Clarke
- Original air date: 4 January 1973
- Running time: 30 minutes

Guest appearances
- Blake Butler as Mr Wainwright; Rosemary Martin as Mrs Partridge; Michael Stainton as Vicar; John Barratt as Kid; Pat Bonna as First Woman; Derek Etchells as Van Driver; Jean McLaren as Second Woman

Episode chronology
← Previous —	Next → "Short Back and Palais Glide"
- Last of the Summer Wine (series 1)

"Of Funerals and Fish" is the pilot episode of the world's longest-running television sitcom, Last of the Summer Wine (1973–2010), written by Roy Clarke. It was first broadcast on 4 January 1973 and became the first of 295 episodes. It was aired as the first episode of the thirteenth series of Comedy Playhouse, a comedy anthology series running from 1961–1975. The plot involved the trio going around discussing life and death.

It starred Bill Owen, Peter Sallis and Michael Bates. This also was the first appearance of Kathy Staff, although her character is at this point only known as Mrs Batty rather than Nora. Her husband, unseen in this first episode, is referred to as Harold; when the character went on to appear in the series, he would be called Wally.
