= Jonathan Linsley =

English actor (born 1956)

- Born: 17 January 1956 (age 70); Bradford, West Riding of Yorkshire, England
- Education: Bristol Old Vic Theatre School
- Years active: 1980–present
- Height: 6 ft 4 in (193 cm)

Jonathan Linsley (born 17 January 1956) is a British actor, best known for his role as 'Crusher' Milburn in the popular TV series Last of the Summer Wine. Linsley started his acting career in the 1980s; besides Last of the Summer Wine, he has appeared in various films and TV shows, including Pirates of the Caribbean: Dead Man's Chest and At World's End.

== Early life ==
Linsley's father was from Ramsgate, Kent and his mother from Cockfield, County Durham; they met during the Second World War when his father was stationed with the tank regiment at Barnard Castle. Linsley was born at Bradford, and raised at Halesowen, near Birmingham, from the age of three, when his father's work dictated relocation, then at Tamworth, Staffordshire. When his father retired from industry, he bought a shop in the town of Skipton, North Yorkshire. Here Linsley attended Ermysted's Grammar School, during which time he joined the National Youth Theatre, then, despite an interest in working as an actor (encouraged by Only Fools and Horses actor Kenneth MacDonald, who directed Linsley in a play), he was persuaded by his parents to attend university; he initially read English and American Studies at the University of Warwick, but changed courses after the first year, to Theatre Studies. He was then awarded one of two available bursaries, enabling him to undertake a one-year post-graduate course at the Bristol Old Vic Theatre School. After completing his studies he entered repertory theatre at Ipswich, before getting his first television work in advertisements. He won the role of "Crusher" Milburn in the 1985 Last of the Summer Wine stage play, which went on a short commercial tour including the Beck Theatre at Hayes, Hillingdon, Cardiff, and Eastbourne.

== Personal life ==
He was born on 17 January 1956 in Yorkshire, England. Outside of acting, Linsley enjoys travelling and has worked in theatre productions across the UK. He leads a relatively low-key personal life.

== Television ==
In 1984, Linsley played a chef in a sitcom called The Hello Good-bye Man on BBC with Ian Lavender; the show lasted for only one series. Shortly after this, he took the role of large and strong, but dim-witted, "Crusher" Milburn in Last of the Summer Wine. He appeared in this role until 1987 when he elected to go on a diet and was written out of the series. In 1989, Linsley starred as Chunky Livesey in the second and final series of the spin-off prequel First of the Summer Wine, to replace Anthony Keetch who starred as the character in the first series in 1988.

Linsley also appeared as a character in the TV shows Emmerdale (Albert Mistlethwaite), Casualty (DC Newby), The Bill (Dennis Weaver) and The Governor (Bert Threlfall) and as a leading guest actor in many other TV shows and made-for-TV films. He has also made over 50 TV commercials.

== Theatre ==
His West End career includes the comedy Up'n'Under, Roald Dahl's Matilda, Its Ralph and A Midsummer Night's Dream. He appeared in rep in many cities around Britain, and wrote for and appeared in pantomimes with various other actors.

== Selected filmography ==
=== Film ===
Year	Title	Role	Notes
1988	Just Ask for Diamond	Bouncer	
1989	The Phantom of the Opera	Workman	
1999	Dead Bolt Dead	The Hit Man	
2002	The Great Dome Robbery	James Hurley	
2006	Pirates of the Caribbean: Dead Man's Chest	Ogilvey (Dutchman)	
2007	Pirates of the Caribbean: At World's End	Ogilvey (Dutchman)	
2007	National Treasure: Book of Secrets	Buckingham Palace Guard	Uncredited
2011	Patient 17	Gilbert	
2016	The National Union of Space People	Antique Dealer	

=== Television ===
Year	Title	Role	Notes
1984	The Hello Goobye Man	The Chef	1 episode
1984-1987	Last of the Summer Wine	Crusher Milburn	20 episodes
1986	Dempsey and Makepeace	Butch	2 episodes
1986	Emmerdale	Albert	4 episodes
1987	Casualty	Policeman	Episode: "Lifelines"
1989	First of the Summer Wine	Chunky Livesey	Episode: "Ain't Love Dangerous"
1994	The Bill	Jack Biloli	Episode: "Saving Face"
1995	Heartbeat	Billy Black	Episode: "It's All in the Game"
1995-1996	The Governor	Burt Threlfall	6 episodes
1996	The Bill	Bob Ryan	Episode: "Road to Recovery"
1996	The Ruth Rendell Mysteries	Carl Heller	Episode: "The Secret House of Death" (2 parts)
1999	Peak Practice	Ben	Episode: "Wood for the Trees"
2000	The Bill	Des O'Bryan	Episode: "Trusting the Enemy"
2001	The Gentleman Thief	East-End Brute	TV Movie
2001	Silent Witness	Barman	Episode: "Two Below Zero" (2 parts)
2002	Casualty	DC Newby	2 episodes
2002-2004	The Bill	Dennis Weaver	12 episodes
2003	Eastenders: Perfectly Frank	Steve Jackson	TV Movie
2005	Dalziel and Pascoe	Clive Jacobs	Episode: "The Dig" (2 parts)
2005	Ultimate Force	Eric	Episode: "Deadlier Than the Male"
2011	Marchlands	Police Sergeant	3 episodes
