= Juliette Kaplan =

British actress (1939–2019)

- Born: Marlene Juliette Kaplan; 2 October 1939; Bournemouth, Hampshire, England
- Died: 10 October 2019 (aged 80); Westgate-on-Sea, Kent, England
- Occupation: Actress
- Spouse: Harold Hoser (m. 1959; died 1981)
- Children: 3

Marlene Juliette Kaplan (2 October 1939 – 10 October 2019) was a British actress who was most famous for playing the role of Pearl Sibshaw in the BBC comedy Last of the Summer Wine, from 1985 to 2010.

== Early years ==
Kaplan was born in Bournemouth to Jewish parents Pearl (née Cress), a nurse, and Jeremiah Kaplan, a sailor. She spent her early years in South Africa, where her father was from, and moved to New York City when she was nine, before returning to Bournemouth two years later. She took afternoon classes at the Hampshire School of Drama in the town in her teens.

== Career ==
Kaplan worked in many British drama series, including Doctors, Brookside, EastEnders, and London's Burning, and in the film The Death of Klinghoffer (2003).

Kaplan was in Last of the Summer Wine from 1985 until the very final episode on 29 August 2010 as battle-axe Pearl Sibshaw, and did a tour around British theatres in a one actor show, performing as Pearl.

She worked in pantomime in December 2008/January 2009 as the Wicked Queen in Snow White at the Empire Theatre, Consett, and at Buxton Opera House.

In early 2015 she was Agnes Tinker in Coronation Street, the grandmother of established character Beth.

== Personal life and death ==
Kaplan was married to Harold Hoser from 1958 until his death in 1981. They had three children; Mark, Perrina and Tania.

A chain smoker from the age of 14, Kaplan died of cancer at her home in Westgate-on-Sea, Kent on 10 October 2019.

== Television roles ==
Year	Title	Role
1985–2010	Last of the Summer Wine	Pearl Sibshaw; 226 episodes
2000	London's Burning	Croupier
2000	Brookside	Grace
2004	Coming Up	Nana
2005	Doctors	Beverley
2015	Coronation Street	Agnes Tinker; 8 episodes

== Film roles ==
Year	Title	Role	Notes
1958	A Voice Crying in the Wilderness	Salome	as Marlene Kaplan
2003	The Death of Klinghoffer	Miriam, American Hostage	
2006	Are You Ready for Love?	Barry's Mother	
2013	Don't Let Go	Grandma	
2015	You Are Whole	Mrs. Catberg	short
