= Keith Clifford =

British actor (born 1938)

- Born: Keith Clifford; 20 June 1938 (age 88); Halifax, West Riding of Yorkshire, England
- Years active: 1966–2009

Keith Clifford (born 20 June 1938) is a retired British former actor best known for his role as Billy Hardcastle in Last of the Summer Wine between 1999 and 2006.

== Early life ==
Clifford was born in Halifax, West Yorkshire.

== Career ==
He played Billy Hardcastle in the British sitcom Last of the Summer Wine from 1999 until he decided to leave the programme at the end of series 27 in 2006. Billy was a character who believed he was a direct descendant of Robin Hood.

Clifford also made guest appearances on Dear Ladies, Heartbeat, Dalziel and Pascoe and an episode of Cold Feet, and appeared in the TV film Vacuuming Completely Nude in Paradise (2001). In 2007 Clifford played Frank Nicholls in Coronation Street, having previously appeared in the series in the guises of different characters, that of Les Battersby's friend, Charlie West, and Harry Norton, a showbiz associate of Alec Gilroy. Clifford won a Sony Radio Award in 1993 for his portrayal of the Lancashire comedian Frank Randle in the radio play Randle's Scandals.

== Personal life ==
Clifford has four children: twin sons and two daughters.

== Television roles ==
Year	Title	Role
1995	Heartbeat	Mr Flax
1997, 1998, 1999	Coronation Street	Charlie West
1999, 2000, 2001–2006	Last of the Summer Wine	Billy Hardcastle
2001	Dalziel and Pascoe	Stan Parry
2004	Christmas Lights	Eric
2006	Northern Lights	Eric
2007	Coronation Street	Frank Nicholls
