= Jane Freeman (actress) =

British actress (1935–2017)

- Born: Shirley Ann Pithers; 12 June 1935; Brentford, Middlesex, England
- Died: 9 March 2017 (aged 81)
- Education: Royal Welsh College of Music & Drama
- Occupation: Actress
- Years active: 1962–2010
- Spouse: Michael Simpson (m. 1971; died 2007)

Shirley Ann Pithers (12 June 1935 – 9 March 2017), better known as Jane Freeman, was a Welsh actress who was best known for her work on British television, mostly notably for her role as Ivy in Last of the Summer Wine.

== Early years ==
Freeman was born in Brentford, Middlesex, in 1935, the daughter of railway engineer Arthur Pithers and his wife, Joan Pithers, née Dewhurst. She was raised in Merthyr Tydfil following the death of her father in an accident when she was 9 years old and her mother's subsequent remarriage to Russell Evans. For a time, she used his surname and was known as Jane Evans. She graduated from the Cardiff College of Music and Drama (now the Royal Welsh College of Music and Drama) in 1955.

== Career ==
After a stay in London, Freeman joined the Osiris Repertory Theatre touring company, based in Gloucestershire. She joined the Arena Theatre, Sutton Coldfield in 1958, followed by Birmingham Rep from 1968. Her stage appearances include Margaret More in the Welsh Theatre Company's first production, A Man for All Seasons, at Cardiff's New Theatre in 1962.

Freeman’s television roles include Diary Of a Young Man (1964), Crossroads (1964), Touch And Go (1978), and Hannah (1980). She was best known for her role as the abrasive but ultimately kind-hearted café owner Ivy, one of the main characters in the long-running British television comedy Last of the Summer Wine. She was one of only two actors to appear in all series of the show, from 1973 until 2010 (the other being Peter Sallis, who played Norman Clegg): however, unlike Sallis, Freeman did not appear in all of the episodes.

Her film credits included Ghost In The Water (1982), Scrubbers (1982) and Silas Marner: The Weaver of Raveloe (1986).

== Personal life ==
In 1971, Freeman married Michael Simpson, whom she met when he became artistic director of the Birmingham Rep while she was a member of that group.

== Death ==
Freeman died on 9 March 2017 at the age of 81 from lung cancer. Her age was often incorrectly reported as being 96 at the time of her death, but official birth records prove that she was born in 1935.

== Roles ==
=== Television ===
Year	Title	Role	Notes
1964	Diary of a Young Man	Nurse	Episode: "Marriage"
1972–78	Play for Today	Audrey	episode: "The Fishing Party"
1972–78	Play for Today	Housing Official	Episode: "Highway Robbery"
1972–78	Play for Today	Martha Paisley	Episode: "Through the Night"
1972–78	Play for Today	Knitting Lady	Episode: "Love on a Gunboat"
1972–78	Play for Today	Mrs. Scully	Episode: Scully's New Year's Eve"
1973–2010	Last of the Summer Wine	Ivy	Series 1–31 (supporting role, 273 episodes)
1975–76	Within These Walls	Madge Boyle	Episode: "To Reason Why"
1975–76	Within These Walls	Ethel Cumberpatch	Episode: "Islands in the Heartline"
1975	Zigger Zagger	Mother	3 episodes
1975	Trinity Tales	Cashier	Episode: "The Fryer's Tale"
1976–77	Crossroads	Emily Burrell	15 episodes
1978	Touch and Go	Mrs. Meighan	Miniseries (4 episodes)
1979	Prince Regent	Lady de Clifford	Miniseries (1 episode)
1980	Hannah	Lilla Spencer-Smith	4 episodes
1980	ITV Playhouse	Mrs. Allen	Episode: "Lindsey"
1981	BBC2 Playhouse	Aunt Arina	Episode: "Marriage"
1982	Ghost in the Water	Mrs. Willetts	TV movie
1983	The Hard Word	Labour Candidate	Episode: "Life Isn't Like Pictures"
1983	The Black Adder	Mrs. Applebottom	Episode: "The Queen of Spain's Beard"
1983	Androcles and the Lion	Megaera	TV movie
1984	Letty	Florence Jones	Miniseries (2 episodes)
1984	A Taste of Honey	Helen	Miniseries (3 episodes)
1985	Scene	Mrs. June Bristow	Episode: "Baby I Love You"
1985	Silas Marner: The Weaver of Raveloe	Mrs. Kimble	TV movie

=== Film ===
Year	Title	Role
1979	All Day on the Sands	Mrs. Cattley
1980	Dark Water	Managers's Wife
1982	Scrubbers	Sister

== See also ==
- Recurring characters in Last of the Summer Wine
