= Sarah Thomas (actress) =

British actress (born 1952)

- Born: Sarah Jane Thomas; 5 June 1952 (age 74); London, England

Sarah Jane Thomas (born 5 June 1952) is a British actress, best known for her television appearances as Enid Simmons in Worzel Gummidge (1980), and as Glenda Wilkinson in Last of the Summer Wine (1986–2010).

== Career ==
Sarah Thomas began her television career with an episode of the drama Special Branch in 1970. Other TV appearances include Within These Walls (1974–75), The Velvet Glove (1977), Together (1980), Worzel Gummidge (1979–81), in which she played the recurring role of Enid, The Black Adder (1983), Miracles Take Longer (1984), Shroud for a Nightingale (1984), and Happy Families (1985).

In 1985, she joined the cast of the internationally successful BBC television sitcom Last of the Summer Wine as Glenda, the daughter of Thora Hird's character. She stayed with the series for 25 years, until it came to an end in 2010.

Her most recent television guest star roles have been in episodes of Heartbeat, The Bill and Doctors.

In theatre she has starred in many productions, most notably as Mrs. Danvers in Rebecca and as Miss Marple in Agatha Christie's A Murder is Announced.

== Filmography ==
Year	Film	Role	Notes
1970	Special Branch	Au Pair Girl	TV series (1 episode: "Sorry Is Just a Word")
1975	Play for Today	Grace	TV series (1 episode: "Rumpole of the Bailey")
1975	Within These Walls	Susan	TV series (3 episodes: 1975–1976)
1977	The Velvet Glove	Nurse	TV series (1 episode: "Auntie's Niece")
1979	Worzel Gummidge	Enid Simmons	TV series (8 episodes: 1979–1981)
1980	Together	Alison Warner	TV series (3 episodes)
1983	The Black Adder	Mrs. Field, a Goodwife	TV series (1 episode: "Witchsmeller Pursuivant")
1984	Miracles Take Longer	Paula's client	TV series (1 episode: "Episode #2.15")
1984	Shroud for a Nightingale	Maureen Burt	TV series (5 episodes)
1985	Happy Families	Novice Catherine	TV series (1 episode: "Joyce")
1995	Madagascar Skin	Crab Hunter	
1995	Moses	Midwife	TV movie
1996	Heartbeat	Doris	TV series (1 episode: "Charity Begins at Home")
1997	The Bill	Lorraine Stuart	TV series (1 episode: "Don't Want to Hear the Bad News")
1986–2010	Last of the Summer Wine	Glenda	TV series (215 episodes)
2011	Doctors	Christine Vinnick	TV series (1 episode: "Relax and Rejuvenate")

== Pantomime appearances ==
In December 2007, Thomas starred in Cinderella at the Assembly Hall Theatre, Tunbridge Wells as the Fairy Godmother, appearing with Tom Vaughan from Hollyoaks, and Barney Harwood. In 2008-09, she again starred as the Fairy Godmother in Cinderella, but this time at the Grand Theatre in Swansea, alongside Su Pollard and Chris Jarvis.

From December 2009 to January 2010, she appeared in Jack and the Beanstalk at the Malvern Theatre, with Mike Fischetti and Colin Baker.
