= List of Last of the Summer Wine episodes =

The following is an episode list for the long-running BBC One sitcom Last of the Summer Wine which was broadcast from 4 January 1973 to 29 August 2010.

== Overview ==
The pilot episode aired as an episode of Comedy Playhouse on 4 January 1973 and the first full series of episodes premiered on 12 November the very same year. The 31st (and final) series started broadcasting on 25 July 2010. Every episode was written by Roy Clarke.

As of 29 August 2010 (the very last day of transmission), a total of 295 episodes of Last of the Summer Wine have aired. This includes the Comedy Playhouse pilot, twenty-four Christmas Specials, three New Year Specials and a Millennium Special (but not the short Christmas sketch, a comedy trial or the 25 Year and 30 Year Documentaries). Some of these have been regular episodes (often held over from the previous series, or taken from the forthcoming series), others have been dedicated festive stories. Some of these specials have also been feature-length. All episodes are 30 minutes long, unless otherwise stated.

== Series overview ==
Series	Episodes	Originally released	
Series	Episodes	First released	Last released
Pilot		4 January 1973	
1	6	12 November 1973	17 December 1973
2	7	5 March 1975	16 April 1975
3	7	27 October 1976	8 December 1976
4	9	9 November 1977	4 January 1978
5	8	18 September 1979	30 October 1979
6	8	4 January 1982	15 February 1982
7	8	30 January 1983	6 March 1983
8	7	10 February 1985	17 March 1985
9	15	1 January 1986	27 December 1987
10	7	16 October 1988	20 November 1988
11	8	15 October 1989	26 November 1989
12	11	2 September 1990	4 November 1990
13	7	18 October 1991	29 November 1991
14	10	25 October 1992	20 December 1992
15	10	24 October 1993	19 December 1993
16	9	1 January 1995	25 February 1995
17	11	3 September 1995	5 November 1995
18	11	20 April 1997	22 June 1997
19	11	4 January 1998	8 March 1998
20	10	18 April 1999	27 June 1999
21	11	2 April 2000	4 June 2000
22	10	1 April 2001	3 June 2001
23	11	6 January 2002	10 March 2002
24	11	5 January 2003	16 March 2003
25	11	8 February 2004	18 April 2004
26	11	13 March 2005	29 May 2005
27	11	5 March 2006	30 April 2006
28	10	15 July 2007	23 September 2007
29	11	22 June 2008	31 August 2008
30	11	19 April 2009	21 June 2009
31	6	25 July 2010	29 August 2010

== Episodes ==
=== Series 1 (1973) ===
The pilot episode, known as either "The Last of the Summer Wine" or "Of Funerals and Fish", which originally premiered on the BBC's Comedy Playhouse, was included as a special feature on the Series 31 & 32 disc 4 which was released on 15 August 2016.

No.	Title	Directed by	Written by	Original release date
Comedy Playhouse pilot
1	"Of Funerals and Fish"	James Gilbert	Roy Clarke	4 January 1973
Blamire, Compo and Clegg go around town, discussing life and death, watching their fellow townspeople with their problems.
Regular series
2	"Short Back and Palais Glide"	James Gilbert	Roy Clarke	12 November 1973
At the library, Clegg and Blamire turn Compo upside down to rid him of evil spirits and are thrown out by Mr Wainwright.
3	"Inventor of the Forty Foot Ferret"	James Gilbert	Roy Clarke	19 November 1973
Blamire tries to persuade atheist Compo to visit church, challenging Compo to sit there for five minutes without saying anything.
4	"Pâté and Chips"	James Gilbert	Roy Clarke	26 November 1973
The trio decide to visit a local stately home with Compo's nephew, Chip, and his family.
5	"Spring Fever"	James Gilbert	Roy Clarke	3 December 1973
Nora Batty is panic-stricken when Compo cleans his house rather than go to the library with Clegg and Blamire.
6	"The New Mobile Trio"	James Gilbert	Roy Clarke	10 December 1973
Clegg buys a car from a man named Walter who attempted to teach a dog how to ride a bicycle.
7	"Hail Smiling Morn or Thereabouts"	James Gilbert	Roy Clarke	17 December 1973
Blamire decides to take up photography and Clegg suggests they camp out and photograph the sunrise.

=== Series 2 (1975) ===
No.	Title	Directed by	Written by	Original release date
8	"Forked Lightning"	Bernard Thompson	Roy Clarke	5 March 1975
After Clegg has several extremely embarrassing accidents on his bicycle, he decides to have it repaired.
9	"Who's That Dancing With Nora Batty, Then?"	Bernard Thompson	Roy Clarke	12 March 1975
Compo's neighbour, Gloria, is emigrating to Australia, so he decides to throw her a farewell party at Sid's Café.
10	"The Changing Face of Rural Blamire"	Bernard Thompson	Roy Clarke	19 March 1975
Blamire decides to get a job and is hired on by ShinyGlow Products, owned by a Welshman named Oswald Green.
11	"Some Enchanted Evening"	Bernard Thompson	Roy Clarke	26 March 1975
Compo's request for "Some Enchanted Evening" is played on the radio, dedicated to Nora.
12	"A Quiet Drink"	Bernard Thompson	Roy Clarke	2 April 1975
The trio visit the Clothier's Arms, where one of the regulars is "Mouse" – renowned for never buying a drink for anyone.
13	"Ballad for Wind Instruments and Canoe"	Bernard Thompson	Roy Clarke	9 April 1975
After Arnpepper falls out of his canoe, the trio help him retrieve it. They decide to buy it from him, but soon lose it after trying it out.
14	"Northern Flying Circus"	Bernard Thompson	Roy Clarke	16 April 1975
Compo takes up motorcycling much to the surprise of Blamire and Clegg and suffers a series of mishaps trying to test it out.

=== Series 3 (1976) ===
No.	Title	Directed by	Written by	Original release date
15	"The Man from Oswestry"	Sydney Lotterby	Roy Clarke	27 October 1976
Compo is depressed following Blamire's departure. They soon receive a letter, asking them to help one of their old classmates, Foggy.
16	"Mending Stuart's Leg"	Sydney Lotterby	Roy Clarke	3 November 1976
After being thrown out of the library by Mr. Wainwright, the trio go to the café to find Sid is in trouble with Ivy for not fixing the roof.
17	"The Great Boarding House Bathroom Caper"	Ray Butt	Roy Clarke	10 November 1976
The trio, along with Sid and Ivy, crowd in Compo's nephew, Gordon's, van for a trip to Scarborough for the weekend.
18	"Cheering Up Gordon"	Ray Butt	Roy Clarke	17 November 1976
In the conclusion to the two-parter, the trio get kicked out of a church after Compo's ferrets get loose.
19	"The Kink in Foggy's Niblick"	Sydney Lotterby	Roy Clarke	24 November 1976
After a game of football, Foggy experiences a pain and says his real forte is playing golf, although he admits not playing since 1939.
20	"Going to Gordon's Wedding"	Sydney Lotterby	Roy Clarke	1 December 1976
The trio go to Gordon's wedding and Compo buys him an alarm clock as a wedding present.
21	"Isometrics and After"	Sydney Lotterby	Roy Clarke	8 December 1976
Deciding that the three of them are unfit, Foggy instructs Clegg and Compo in a method of exercise called "isometrics".

=== Series 4 (1977–1978) ===
No.	Title	Directed by	Written by	Original release date
22	"Ferret Come Home"	Sydney Lotterby	Roy Clarke	9 November 1977
One of Compo's ferrets escapes into Nora's house. Can Wally retrieve it?
23	"Getting on Sidney's Wire"	Sydney Lotterby	Roy Clarke	16 November 1977
Sid is installing a doorbell in the cafe, and the trio decide to help him.
24	"Jubilee"	Sydney Lotterby	Roy Clarke	23 November 1977
It is the Queen's Silver Jubilee, and Foggy decides that the trio should help the vicar's parade.
25	"Flower Power Cut"	Sydney Lotterby	Roy Clarke	30 November 1977
Clegg tries to persuades the others that flowers have feelings and will respond to music.
26	"Who Made a Bit of a Splash in Wales, Then?"	Sydney Lotterby	Roy Clarke	7 December 1977
Foggy is visiting a lady friend in Wales, but what will happen when Compo and Clegg intrude?
27	"Greenfingers"	Sydney Lotterby	Roy Clarke	21 December 1977
Foggy is disappointed in the size of the vegetables being sold in the market, so searches out some bigger examples.
28	"A Merry Heatwave"	Sydney Lotterby	Roy Clarke	1 January 1978
Nora's brother is unlikely to see another British Christmas, but unfortunately where do you find holly in the middle of a summer heatwave.
29	"The Bandit from Stoke-on-Trent"	Sydney Lotterby	Roy Clarke	4 January 1978
Why has "Laugh a Minute" Amos Hames returned to town? Foggy is suspicious.
Christmas special
30	"Small Tune on a Penny Wassail"	Sydney Lotterby	Roy Clarke	26 December 1978
Christmas arrives and the trio visit a friend in hospital, before opening their presents.

=== Series 5 (1979) ===
No.	Title	Directed by	Written by	Original release date
31	"Full Steam Behind"	Sydney Lotterby	Roy Clarke	18 September 1979
Foggy takes Compo and Clegg to the reopening of the Keighley and Worth Valley Railway. Compo accidentally starts the engine so the trio try to catch it. When they finally do catch it, Foggy then insists on driving the engine back where they found it.
32	"The Flag and Its Snag"	Sydney Lotterby	Roy Clarke	25 September 1979
Foggy has a plan to erect a huge flag in the hills, but first they'll have to get the flagpole up there.
33	"The Flag and Further Snags"	Sydney Lotterby	Roy Clarke	2 October 1979
Foggy collects his flag, and achieves his dream... for a little while.
34	"Deep in the Heart of Yorkshire"	Sydney Lotterby	Roy Clarke	9 October 1979
What are Sid and Wally doing in the woods? The trio promise Ivy and Nora to find out.
35	"Earnshaw Strikes Again"	Sydney Lotterby	Roy Clarke	16 October 1979
Foggy upsets the others by denying the existence of the ancient Yorkshire gods.
36	"Here We Go into the Wild Blue Yonder"	Sydney Lotterby	Roy Clarke	23 October 1979
Compo wants to impress Nora by taking up hanggliding, so the trio ask Wally to build a hangglider for them.
37	"Here We Go Again into the Wild Blue Yonder"	Sydney Lotterby	Roy Clarke	30 October 1979
Wally has finished the hangglider and it's ready to test.
Christmas special
38	"And a Dewhurst Up a Fir Tree"	Sydney Lotterby	Roy Clarke	27 December 1979
Foggy decides to start his shopping early, but is surprised the shops aren't selling Christmas cards in the summer. He then takes up an offer of buying some Christmas trees.

=== Series 6 (1981–1982) ===
No.	Title	Directed by	Written by	Original release date
Christmas special
39	"Whoops"	Alan J. W. Bell	Roy Clarke	25 December 1981
The trio decide to look up some old school friends, to try and recapture the spirit of Christmas from the past.
Regular series
40	"In the Service of Humanity"	Alan J. W. Bell	Roy Clarke	4 January 1982
Foggy decides to start up a rescue service, and Wally is a perfect customer.
41	"Car and Garter"	Alan J. W. Bell	Roy Clarke	11 January 1982
After meeting car enthusiast Wesley Pegden, Compo volunteers to test drive his car, in order to impress Nora Batty.
42	"The Odd Dog Men"	Alan J. W. Bell	Roy Clarke	18 January 1982
Foggy decides to open up a dog walking service.
43	"A Bicycle Made for Three"	Alan J. W. Bell	Roy Clarke	25 January 1982
After the trio ride, and crash, Clegg's bike, they decide that they need a bike each.
44	"One of the Last Few Places Unexplored by Man"	Alan J. W. Bell	Roy Clarke	1 February 1982
Compo wants to have his photograph taken in Nora Batty's bedroom.
45	"Serenade for Tight Jeans and Metal Detector"	Alan J. W. Bell	Roy Clarke	8 February 1982
Foggy persuades Compo to buy a new pair of trousers, and Clegg to buy a Metal Detector.
46	"From Wellies to Wet Suit"	Alan J. W. Bell	Roy Clarke	15 February 1982
Compo buys Sid's wet suit and, after a go at snorkeling, he is persuaded to take up water-skiing.

=== Series 7 (1982–1983) ===
No.	Title	Directed by	Written by	Original release date
Christmas special
47	"All Mod Conned"	Sydney Lotterby	Roy Clarke	25 December 1982
Deciding to abandon the commercialised side of Christmas, Foggy books a caravan for the trio.
Regular series
48	"The Frozen Turkey Man"	Sydney Lotterby	Roy Clarke	30 January 1983
Compo and Clegg decide that Foggy needs a woman, and they persuade a barmaid that he is a millionaire. Compo looks for a treacle tin he buried as a kid, with help from two boys' scooters.
49	"The White Man's Grave"	Sydney Lotterby	Roy Clarke	6 February 1983
Deciding that Wally needs a break from Nora, the trio decide to swap Clegg with Wally.
50	"The Waist Land"	Sydney Lotterby	Roy Clarke	13 February 1983
Foggy hits upon a money making idea – Selling junk food to people from the local health club.
51	"Cheering Up Ludovic"	Sydney Lotterby	Roy Clarke	20 February 1983
Ludovic has bought a tatty old van, but is too drunk to drive it. So it's up to Clegg to drive them home. some mishaps lead to Clegg, Wally and Nora trying to catch the now driverless van.
52	"The Three Astaires"	Sydney Lotterby	Roy Clarke	27 February 1983
Foggy volunteers the trio to help out at a church concert party, but Compo can't resist trying on a suit of armour.
53	"The Arts of Concealment"	Sydney Lotterby	Roy Clarke	6 March 1983
Foggy demonstrates his army camouflage techniques, to the dismay of a group of cyclists.
Christmas special
54	"Getting Sam Home"	Alan J. W. Bell	Roy Clarke	27 December 1983
The lads visit Sam in hospital, and agree to help him spend one last night with his 'other woman', Lilly Bless'er. the trio, and Sid, then have to move Sam several times before his funeral, But Ivy is suspicious of their activity. This was the last episode to feature John Comer as Sid.

=== Series 8 (1984–1985) ===
No.	Title	Directed by	Written by	Original release date
Christmas special
55	"The Loxley Lozenge"	Alan J. W. Bell	Roy Clarke	30 December 1984
Wesley needs some help. He's found an old racing car, and wants the lads to help him get it home.
Regular series
56	"The Mysterious Feet of Nora Batty"	Alan J. W. Bell	Roy Clarke	10 February 1985
Foggy and Compo have a disagreement about the size of Nora's feet, so they set out to find out the truth.
57	"Keeping Britain Tidy"	Alan J. W. Bell	Roy Clarke	17 February 1985
Foggy decides to embark upon a campaign to clean up the countryside, starting with an old mattress.
58	"Enter the Phantom"	Alan J. W. Bell	Roy Clarke	24 February 1985
Compo transforms himself into 'The Phantom', a daredevil motorcyclist. Will this impress Nora?
59	"Catching Digby's Donkey"	Alan J. W. Bell	Roy Clarke	3 March 1985
Foggy offers to help Digby catch his Donkey.
60	"The Woollen Mills of Your Mind"	Alan J. W. Bell	Roy Clarke	10 March 1985
Compo comes up with yet another plan to impress Nora – entering a marathon.
61	"Who's Looking After the Cafe, Then?"	Alan J. W. Bell	Roy Clarke	17 March 1985
Foggy volunteers to look after Ivy's Cafe, while she goes out.

=== Series 9 (1986–1987) ===
No.	Title	Directed by	Written by	Original release date
Specials
62	"Uncle of the Bride"	Alan J. W. Bell	Roy Clarke	1 January 1986
Glenda, Edie and Wesley's daughter, is marrying the hapless but kind-hearted Barry.
63	"Merry Christmas Father Christmas"	Alan J. W. Bell	Roy Clarke	28 December 1986
Seymour attempts to instil some magic into the festive season by dressing a reluctant Compo as Father Christmas.
Regular series
64	"Why Does Norman Clegg Buy Ladies' Stockings"	Alan J. W. Bell	Roy Clarke	4 January 1987
Howard persuades a reluctant Clegg to take a message to Marina in the store where she works. Seymour invents a drill and uses it in an attempt to find oil, with unhappy results.
65	"The Heavily Reinforced Bottom"	Alan J. W. Bell	Roy Clarke	11 January 1987
Compo takes up canoeing, with disastrous results.
66	"Dried Dates and Codfanglers"	Alan J. W. Bell	Roy Clarke	18 January 1987
Seymour invents a high-security door lock, which fails miserably. Compo has lost a prized possession- a date Nora Batty threw at him!
67	"The Really Masculine Purse"	Alan J. W. Bell	Roy Clarke	25 January 1987
After Compo claims that any man who uses a purse is effeminate, Seymour tries to invent a strictly masculine purse.
68	"Who's Feeling Ejected, Then?"	Alan J. W. Bell	Roy Clarke	1 February 1987
Seymour builds an ejector seat, which Compo is persuaded to test.
69	"The Ice-Cream Man Cometh"	Alan J. W. Bell	Roy Clarke	8 February 1987
Seymour misses the good old days, and decides to promote the old tradition of bicycling ice-cream men.
70	"Set the People Free"	Alan J. W. Bell	Roy Clarke	15 February 1987
Howard and Wally have both been confined to quarters, and it's up to the trio to try to break them free.
71	"Go with the Flow"	Alan J. W. Bell	Roy Clarke	22 February 1987
Seymour volunteers the trio to help the Vicar and they are assigned to sell tickets for a production of Beatrix Potter.
72	"Jaws"	Alan J. W. Bell	Roy Clarke	1 March 1987
Seymour invents a new waste disposal unit for Edie.
73	"Edie and the Automobile"	Alan J. W. Bell	Roy Clarke	8 March 1987
Edie is having driving lessons – no-one is safe!
74	"Wind Power"	Alan J. W. Bell	Roy Clarke	15 March 1987
Seymour invents wind-powered rollerskates.
75	"When You Take a Good Bite, Yorkshire Tastes Terrible"	Alan J. W. Bell	Roy Clarke	22 March 1987
Clegg receives word that an old friend has died in America. The trio relive some happy memories as a tribute. This is the last episode with Joe Gladwin as Wally Batty.
Christmas special
76	"Big Day at Dream Acres"	Alan J. W. Bell	Roy Clarke	27 December 1987
There's a big fete at Dream Acres, But why is a tramp so interested in one of the donkeys?

=== Series 10 (1988) ===
No.	Title	Directed by	Written by	Original release date
77	"The Experiment"	Alan J. W. Bell	Roy Clarke	16 October 1988
Compo wonders why blood rushes to your head when you're upside down. Seymour sets up an experiment to explain.
78	"The Treasure of the Deep"	Alan J. W. Bell	Roy Clarke	23 October 1988
After finding a valuable-looking object in a stream, Seymour is convinced it's part of robbers' swag, and sets out to recover the rest of the stolen items, by having Compo search the river in a homemade submarine.
79	"Dancing Feet"	Alan J. W. Bell	Roy Clarke	30 October 1988
Compo has hard skin on his feet, and in desperation, he buys a herbal remedy from a gypsy. the cure doesn't go down well with the other guests at the Church luncheon that afternoon. The music used when the trio are pushing Edie's car includes a short part of the main theme to the 1977 film A Bridge Too Far.
80	"That Certain Smile"	Alan J. W. Bell	Roy Clarke	6 November 1988
Smiler is in hospital, and missing his beloved dog. The trio attempt to smuggle her into the hospital.
81	"Downhill Racer"	Alan J. W. Bell	Roy Clarke	13 November 1988
Seymour would love to go skiing, but in the absence of snow, he decides they should try sliding downhill on dinner trays.
82	"The Day of the Welsh Ferret"	Alan J. W. Bell	Roy Clarke	20 November 1988
The trio go to a funeral, but Compo insists on bringing along a pet ferret.
Christmas special
83	"Crums"	Alan J. W. Bell	Roy Clarke	24 December 1988
Barry intends to buy Glenda a water bed, the trio dress as Father Christmases for a charity event, and Howard looks for someone to guard Auntie Wainwright's shop.

=== Series 11 (1989) ===
No.	Title	Directed by	Written by	Original release date
84	"Come Back, Jack Harry Teesdale"	Alan J. W. Bell	Roy Clarke	15 October 1989
After getting a lift from Jack Harry Teesdale and his wife, the trio offer to help solve a marriage problem – parking their caravan.
85	"The Kiss and Mavis Poskit"	Alan J. W. Bell	Roy Clarke	22 October 1989
Clegg is in hiding, after Nora, Ivy and the rest of the ladies, want to fix him up with a timid woman who he knew at school.
86	"Oh Shut Up and Eat Your Choc Ice"	Alan J. W. Bell	Roy Clarke	29 October 1989
After knocking a bale of hay down the hill, how will they get it back into place?
87	"Who's That Bloke with Nora Batty, Then?"	Alan J. W. Bell	Roy Clarke	5 November 1989
Compo is filled with jealousy when he spots Nora with a man.
88	"Happy Anniversary Gough and Jessie"	Alan J. W. Bell	Roy Clarke	12 November 1989
The lads are at a friend’s golden wedding anniversary, and decide that it's time for him to sample some of the other pleasures of life.
89	"Getting Barry Higher in the World"	Alan J. W. Bell	Roy Clarke	19 November 1989
Seymour designs a kite for Compo, but doesn't count on Wesley mixing the measurements up.
90	"Three Men and a Mangle"	Alan J. W. Bell	Roy Clarke	26 November 1989
Nora asks Compo to deliver her mangle to a friend. What can possibly go wrong?
Christmas special
91	"What's Santa Brought for Nora, Then?"	Alan J. W. Bell	Roy Clarke	23 December 1989
Compo is trying to earn some money to buy Nora a Christmas present. Surely Auntie Wainwright will have something suitable.

=== Series 12 (1990) ===
No.	Title	Directed by	Written by	Original release date
92	"Return of the Warrior"	Alan J. W. Bell	Roy Clarke	2 September 1990
Compo and Clegg see Seymour off, ready to take up a post of headmaster. They then just keep missing a returning Foggy. This was the last episode to feature Michael Aldridge as Seymour.
93	"Come In, Sunray Major"	Alan J. W. Bell	Roy Clarke	9 September 1990
After Compo and Clegg sneak off without Foggy realising while out walking, he comes up with an idea – portable radios. Compo breaks one, so Clegg schemes up a heroic explanation – Compo will "break" it, while "rescuing" Marina.
94	"The Charity Balls"	Alan J. W. Bell	Roy Clarke	16 September 1990
Compo, Clegg, Foggy, and Howard take part in sponsored football dribble for charity.
95	"Walking Stiff Can Make You Famous"	Alan J. W. Bell	Roy Clarke	23 September 1990
Foggy has come up with another idea, bicycle polo.
96	"That's Not Captain Zero"	Alan J. W. Bell	Roy Clarke	30 September 1990
After meeting Captain Zero, the human cannonball, the trio take him to the pub while his van is fixed. When Captain Zero is arrested for drunk driving, Compo stands in, but Foggy doesn't use enough gunpowder in the cannon.
97	"Das Welly Boot"	Alan J. W. Bell	Roy Clarke	7 October 1990
Foggy decides to restore an old boat, and Compo knows who he wants to take on the first trip...Nora Batty. Barry looks for his Car engine, not knowing Wesley has put it in the boat. Clegg, Howard & Pearl get re-housed.
98	"The Empire That Foggy Nearly Built"	Alan J. W. Bell	Roy Clarke	14 October 1990
After seeing an argument over a parking space, Foggy decides there must be money to be made out of car parking. Compo fails as a parking attedant, so Foggy tries valet parking, with Clegg as the valet.
99	"The Last Surviving Maurice Chevalier Impression"	Alan J. W. Bell	Roy Clarke	21 October 1990
Compo goes on a local TV program with his Maurice Chevalier impression.
100	"Roll On"	Alan J. W. Bell	Roy Clarke	28 October 1990
The trio train for a barrel rolling event.
101	"A Landlady for Smiler"	Alan J. W. Bell	Roy Clarke	4 November 1990
The lads help Smiler find a new place to live.
Christmas special
102	"Barry's Christmas"	Alan J. W. Bell	Roy Clarke	27 December 1990
Glenda's upset because Barry didn't come home the night before. The trio find him dressed as Santa Claus, under a table in the local pub. They then try to help Barry sober up before Glenda finds out. Foggy's Christmas present to himself, a bleeper, doesn't help matters when the ladies start following the signal.

=== Series 13 (1991) ===
No.	Title	Directed by	Written by	Original release date
103	"Quick, Quick, Slow"	Alan J. W. Bell	Roy Clarke	18 October 1991
Nora has taken Smiler in as her lodger, and Compo is depressed about it.
104	"Give Us a Lift"	Alan J. W. Bell	Roy Clarke	25 October 1991
Compo is convinced the hills are getting steeper, so Foggy invents a chair lift.
105	"Was That Nora Batty Singing?"	Alan J. W. Bell	Roy Clarke	1 November 1991
Compo believes he can hear Nora singing, and is convinced that she and Smiler are having an affair.
106	"Cash Flow Problems"	Alan J. W. Bell	Roy Clarke	8 November 1991
Compo is skint, but remembers that he's owed money from an old schoolfriend, so the trio set off to track him down.
107	"Passing the Earring"	Alan J. W. Bell	Roy Clarke	15 November 1991
Howard asks Clegg whether he can return an earring to Marina.
108	"Pole Star"	Alan J. W. Bell	Roy Clarke	29 November 1991
Compo is depressed because he's too short to help Nora hang her washing line, but Foggy suggests that she'd be impressed if he could vault up onto the wall. (No episode 22 Nov 1991, due to broadcast of BBC Children in Need)
Christmas special
109	"Situations Vacant"	Alan J. W. Bell	Roy Clarke	22 December 1991
Foggy decides to start up a motorbike courier service.

=== Series 14 (1992) ===
No.	Title	Directed by	Written by	Original release date
110	"By The Magnificent Thighs of Ernie Burniston"	Alan J. W. Bell	Roy Clarke	25 October 1992
Howard asks Clegg to deliver a birthday card to Marina, and Foggy decides that it's time Compo got fit.
111	"Errol Flynn Used to Have a Pair Like That"	Alan J. W. Bell	Roy Clarke	1 November 1992
Compo finds out that Nora likes a man in horse-riding gear. When Nora wants to see Compo on a horse, Foggy settles on a plan involving Smiler and a pair of coconuts.
112	"The Phantom of the Graveyard"	Alan J. W. Bell	Roy Clarke	8 November 1992
An old school teacher of the trio has died, so the lads are off to his funeral.
113	"The Self-Propelled Salad Strainer"	Alan J. W. Bell	Roy Clarke	15 November 1992
Wesley has plans for a ride-on lawnmower. He's going to adapt it for the purpose of cleaning windows.
114	"Ordeal by Trousers"	Alan J. W. Bell	Roy Clarke	22 November 1992
Suspicious about the truthfulness of Foggy's war stories, Compo and Clegg use an old school challenge to root out liars on him. Compo performs in the Church concert, with Clegg and Foggy as his backing singers. Foggy then starts dancing to try and get rid of the Beetle in his trousers.
115	"Happy Birthday, Howard"	Alan J. W. Bell	Roy Clarke	29 November 1992
Marina asks Clegg to deliver a birthday present to Howard. It'd be an easier job if the present weren't a giant cuddly panda.
116	"Who's Got Rhythm?"	Alan J. W. Bell	Roy Clarke	6 December 1992
Compo is short of money, but after a flash of inspiration (and a visit to Auntie Wainwrights), he becomes a one-man band.
117	"Camera Shy"	Alan J. W. Bell	Roy Clarke	13 December 1992
Foggy buys a camcorder from Auntie Wainwright, and practices filming in the hills. Pearl offers her video machine to watch the footage. Howards thinks Foggy might have caught him and Marina on film, so pays Compo to distract everyone.
118	"Wheelies"	Alan J. W. Bell	Roy Clarke	20 December 1992
Foggy invents a new form of transport... a giant wheel. After getting the giant wheel to Wesley's, Compo finds himself volunteered to test drive it.
Christmas special
119	"Stop That Castle!"	Alan J. W. Bell	Roy Clarke	26 December 1992
The trio visit Auntie Wainwright, to rent a bouncy castle for the Christmas parade. The ladies are reluctant to take part, Smiler makes a very unhappy Noddy, and Howard, dressed as a sheep, looks for his "Bo Peep", and gets a shock when he does!

=== Series 15 (1993) ===
No.	Title	Directed by	Written by	Original release date
120	"How to Clear Your Pipes"	Alan J. W. Bell	Roy Clarke	24 October 1993
Foggy puts Compo and Clegg through an exhaustive training course that leaves them trapped inside sewer pipes.
121	"Where There's Smoke, There's Barbecue"	Alan J. W. Bell	Roy Clarke	31 October 1993
The trio gets a gas grill from Auntie Wainwright, but its alarming potency brings an explosive touch to their barbecue.
122	"The Black Widow"	Alan J. W. Bell	Roy Clarke	7 November 1993
Too much home brew at a funeral tea leaves Compo and Foggy having to rescue Clegg from the arms of an amorous widow.
123	"Have You Got a Light Mate?"	Alan J. W. Bell	Roy Clarke	14 November 1993
Smiler is selling security lights. Howard is determined to buy Marina a china shepherdess – if he can persuade Clegg to visit Auntie Wainwright's.
124	"Stop That Bath"	Alan J. W. Bell	Roy Clarke	21 November 1993
The trio finds they are involved in yet another of Howard's schemes to get a present to Marina-this time a cast iron bath!
125	"Springing Smiler"	Alan J. W. Bell	Roy Clarke	28 November 1993
Smiler is sick of living in misery with Nora Batty and will hand over 50 quid to anyone who will help him move out and live in misery somewhere else.
126	"Concerto for Solo Bicycle"	Alan J. W. Bell	Roy Clarke	5 December 1993
Foggy comes up with the crazy idea of bicycle safety underwear after he collides with Compo riding his old bike.
127	"There Are Gypsies at the Bottom of Our Garden"	Alan J. W. Bell	Roy Clarke	12 December 1993
Dewhurst's "Nature Tours" are launched by Foggy after he believes he's discovered the nesting place of a giant woodpecker.
128	"Aladdin Gets on Your Wick"	Alan J. W. Bell	Roy Clarke	19 December 1993
After seeing a man on a sailboard, Foggy has the idea of inventing a three-man version.
Christmas special
129	"Welcome to Earth"	Alan J. W. Bell	Roy Clarke	27 December 1993
The trio join Darren's friend in expecting a visitation from outer space (or maybe even Huddersfield).

=== Series 16 (1995) ===
No.	Title	Directed by	Written by	Original release date
New Year special
130	"The Man Who Nearly Knew Pavarotti"	Alan J. W. Bell	Roy Clarke	1 January 1995
After Wesley almost runs over Billy Ingleton. Foggy gets to prove his talents as a concert promoter.
Regular series
131	"The Glory Hole"	Alan J. W. Bell	Roy Clarke	8 January 1995
While out in the hills one day, Foggy sees a hole in the road that reminds him of a World War II slit trench.
132	"Adopted by a Stray"	Alan J. W. Bell	Roy Clarke	15 January 1995
The trio meet Mr Broadbent, who is giving up everything to find the wilderness.
133	"The Defeat of the Stoneworm"	Alan J. W. Bell	Roy Clarke	22 January 1995
Howard says he has stoneworm in his cellar, so the trio try to convince everyone that stoneworm are real.
134	"Once in a Moonlit Junkyard"	Alan J. W. Bell	Roy Clarke	29 January 1995
Compo has a visit from a mysterious motorcyclist and eventually realises it could be Babs, one of his old girlfriends.
135	"The Space Ace"	Alan J. W. Bell	Roy Clarke	5 February 1995
Stanley 'Ace' Pocklington is training to be an astronaut, but when he gets drunk, Foggy devises a whole training programme for him.
136	"The Most Powerful Eyeballs in West Yorkshire"	Alan J. W. Bell	Roy Clarke	12 February 1995
The trio have a go at hypnotherapy to help Howard take control over Pearl, but Foggy ends up hypnotising himself.
137	"The Dewhirsts of Ogleby Hall"	Alan J. W. Bell	Roy Clarke	19 February 1995
Foggy believes he could be related to the Dewhirsts of Ogleby Hall. Compo buys Nora Batty a hat.
138	"The Sweet Smell of Excess"	Alan J. W. Bell	Roy Clarke	26 February 1995
Compo uses his bed as a trampoline to get up to Nora Batty's window, but ends up getting stuck in the bed springs.

=== Series 17 (1995) ===
No.	Title	Directed by	Written by	Original release date
139	"Leaving Home Forever or Till Teatime"	Alan J. W. Bell	Roy Clarke	3 September 1995
This time it's for real: Howard's had enough of Pearl and decides to leave home forever.
140	"Bicycle Bonanza"	Alan J. W. Bell	Roy Clarke	10 September 1995
The trio hire some bicycles from Auntie Wainwright and have an "off-road" ride through the hills.
141	"The Glamour of the Uniform"	Alan J. W. Bell	Roy Clarke	17 September 1995
When Marina's affections turn to a traffic warden, and boyhood bully, Foggy takes Howard under his wing to help him win her back.
142	"The First Human Being to Ride a Hill"	Alan J. W. Bell	Roy Clarke	24 September 1995
Pearl has confiscated Howard's bicycle, so Wesley builds him a new "secret" one.
143	"Captain Clutterbuck's Treasure"	Alan J. W. Bell	Roy Clarke	1 October 1995
The trio meet Lieutenant Commander Willoughby who tells them all about the famous Yorkshire pirate, Captain Clutterbuck.
144	"Desperate for a Duffield"	Alan J. W. Bell	Roy Clarke	8 October 1995
Compo tries to find one of his old girlfriends, Audrey Duffield but after hearing she moved to Canada, he decides to stay with Nora Batty.
145	"The Suit That Turned Left"	Alan J. W. Bell	Roy Clarke	15 October 1995
The trio meet a man who wants to find the centre of magnetism in Yorkshire.
146	"Beware of the Elbow"	Alan J. W. Bell	Roy Clarke	22 October 1995
The trio meet a man who wants to show the world that he likes fat people & obesity and that he is dead against slimming and weight loss.
147	"The Thing in Wesley's Shed"	Alan J. W. Bell	Roy Clarke	29 October 1995
Just what is the secret invention that Wesley has built? The trio try to find out.
148	"Brushes at Dawn"	Alan J. W. Bell	Roy Clarke	5 November 1995
Compo is shocked to find Nora Batty in a cupboard with another man, and so he challenges him to a duel.
Christmas special
149	"A Leg Up for Christmas"	Alan J. W. Bell	Roy Clarke	24 December 1995
While trying to get himself fit for Christmas, Howard ends up with a broken leg and can't leave the house.

=== Series 18 (1996–1997) ===
No.	Title	Directed by	Written by	Original release date
Christmas special
150	"Extra! Extra!"	Alan J. W. Bell	Roy Clarke	29 December 1996
When the trio persistently interrupt spoof horror film in the area, the director has them recruited as extras, and they soon find they are in good company.
Regular series
151	"The Love Mobile"	Alan J. W. Bell	Roy Clarke	20 April 1997
A mobile dating agency is in the area and Smiler has a date with the owner's wife.
152	"A Clean Sweep"	Alan J. W. Bell	Roy Clarke	27 April 1997
An unlucky chimney sweep is in town and Foggy finds him a good old fashioned chimney to sweep.
153	"The Mysterious C. W. Northrop"	Alan J. W. Bell	Roy Clarke	4 May 1997
Smiler has a crush on Ivy, but pretends it's C.W. Northrop so Ivy won't know it's him.
154	"A Double for Howard"	Alan J. W. Bell	Roy Clarke	11 May 1997
The trio help Howard to find somebody who might look like him from a distance to stand in for him on his date with Marina.
155	"How to Create a Monster"	Alan J. W. Bell	Roy Clarke	18 May 1997
Foggy decides to train Smiler to help him become more confident and lose his deepest fears.
156	"Deviations with Davenport"	Alan J. W. Bell	Roy Clarke	25 May 1997
The trio meet Mr. Davenport, a hapless hiker who aspires to write a guidebook, but Foggy gets them completely lost.
157	"According to the Prophet Bickerdyke"	Alan J. W. Bell	Roy Clarke	1 June 1997
The prophet Bickerdyke has predicted that the world is coming to an end. Clegg wonders whether this information should be trusted.
158	"Next Kiss Please"	Alan J. W. Bell	Roy Clarke	8 June 1997
Foggy bets that Nora Batty will kiss Compo by the end of the day.
159	"Destiny and Six Bananas"	Alan J. W. Bell	Roy Clarke	15 June 1997
A mysterious beast has been spotted in the woods. The trio & Wesley try to capture it.
160	"A Sidecar Named Desire"	Alan J. W. Bell	Roy Clarke	22 June 1997
Compo hires a motorbike and sidecar from Auntie Wainwright and takes Nora Batty for a ride in it. This is the last episode with Brian Wilde as Foggy Dewhurst.

=== Series 19 (1997–1998) ===
No.	Title	Directed by	Written by	Original release date
Christmas special
161	"There Goes the Groom"	Alan J. W. Bell	Roy Clarke	28 December 1997
Barry is best man at a friend's wedding, but when the groom doesn't want to get married, Truly, Compo & Clegg try to convince him of the advantages of a good married life. Last appearance of Foggy Dewhurst but played by a body double as Brian Wilde was too ill to appear.
Regular series
162	"Beware of the Oglethorpe"	Alan J. W. Bell	Roy Clarke	4 January 1998
Compo, Clegg and Truly run into a tired, gloomy old school chum, Coggy Duckworth.
163	"Tarzan of the Towpath"	Alan J. W. Bell	Roy Clarke	11 January 1998
The trio ends up rolling down a hill but their age proves to speak louder than their will for adventure.
164	"Truly and the Hole Truth"	Alan J. W. Bell	Roy Clarke	18 January 1998
Truly becomes jealous of people who get their picture in the paper for performing selfless acts of bravery.
165	"Oh Howard, We Should Get One of Those"	Alan J. W. Bell	Roy Clarke	25 January 1998
Wesley's new creation meets with great success – particularly with Compo – who wants to be the first one to try it.
166	"The Suit That Attracts Blondes"	Alan J. W. Bell	Roy Clarke	1 February 1998
Glenda gives one of Barry's old suits to the jumble sale, because she thinks it attracts blondes.
167	"The Only Diesel Saxophone in Captivity"	Alan J. W. Bell	Roy Clarke	8 February 1998
Barry buys a new saxophone from Auntie Wainwright. Glenda doesn't let him play indoors, so he has to find a spot outside to practise.
168	"Perfection – Thy Name is Ridley"	Alan J. W. Bell	Roy Clarke	15 February 1998
When the local ladies start to gain some interest for a man named Walter Ridley, it's up for the trio to try to find out why.
169	"Nowhere Particular"	Alan J. W. Bell	Roy Clarke	22 February 1998
Howard buys a new van, as part of his new scheme to be left in peace with Marina.
170	"From Audrey Nash to the Widow Dilhooley"	Alan J. W. Bell	Roy Clarke	1 March 1998
Truly hears an old girlfriend of his is coming back to town, and he tries to meet her dressed as he was the last time they saw each other.
171	"Support Your Local Skydiver"	Alan J. W. Bell	Roy Clarke	8 March 1998
Compo finds out that Nora Batty is getting post cards sent from the Canary Islands.

=== Series 20 (1999) ===
No.	Title	Directed by	Written by	Original release date
172	"The Pony Set"	Alan J. W. Bell	Roy Clarke	18 April 1999
Compo decides to take up horse riding to impress Nora Batty, and it's up to Clegg and Truly to help him thanks to Auntie Wainwright's special horse-riding promotion.
173	"How Errol Flynn Discovered the Scar of Nora Batty"	Alan J. W. Bell	Roy Clarke	25 April 1999
The trio come across Billy Hardcastle, a man who believes he is a direct descendant of Robin Hood.
174	"Who's Thrown Her Tom Cruise Photos Away?"	Alan J. W. Bell	Roy Clarke	2 May 1999
Marina finally gets fed up with Howard and swears off men entirely.
175	"What's Happened to Barry's Nose?"	Alan J. W. Bell	Roy Clarke	16 May 1999
Truly tries to help Barry become more confident, but things turn nasty leading to some damage to Barry's nose.
176	"Optimism in the Housing Market"	Alan J. W. Bell	Roy Clarke	23 May 1999
Smiler injures his foot while selling door to door for Auntie Wainwright.
177	"Will Barry go Septic Listening to Classical Music?"	Alan J. W. Bell	Roy Clarke	30 May 1999
Compo, Clegg and Truly are intrigued when they meet a man testing for earthquakes.
178	"Beware the Vanilla Slice"	Alan J. W. Bell	Roy Clarke	6 June 1999
Compo tries to revive interest in the childhood game of "thumpy-dub" and Truly tries to sell his useless lawn-mower.
179	"Howard Throws a Wobbler"	Alan J. W. Bell	Roy Clarke	13 June 1999
Howard seethes with jealousy when he becomes positive that Pearl is having an affair.
180	"The Phantom Number 14 Bus"	Alan J. W. Bell	Roy Clarke	20 June 1999
Truly investigates the curious case of 'The Phantom Number 14 Bus' which disappeared between stops.
181	"Ironing Day"	Alan J. W. Bell	Roy Clarke	27 June 1999
Smiler gets drunk and adventurous on Auntie Wainwright's homemade wine, and Truly and Compo attempt to keep him under control.

=== Series 21 (2000) ===
No.	Title	Directed by	Written by	Original release date
Millennium Special
182	"Last Post and Pigeon"	Alan J. W. Bell	Roy Clarke	2 January 2000
Compo is selected to travel to France with a group of local WWII veterans, only to have the offer withdrawn when the organisers realise how scruffy he looks.
Regular series
183	"Lipstick and Other Problems"	Alan J. W. Bell	Roy Clarke	2 April 2000
When Glenda finds Barry covered in lipstick he needs assistance from the trio to explain it away.
184	"Under the Rug"	Alan J. W. Bell	Roy Clarke	9 April 2000
Clegg finds himself having to model Howard's new wig after Pearl becomes suspicious.
185	"Magic and the Morris Minor"	Alan J. W. Bell	Roy Clarke	16 April 2000
The trio finds a married couple stranded in a field trying to contact ancient civilizations with a Morris Minor hubcap. This was the last episode to feature Bill Owen as Compo Simmonite.
186	"Elegy for Fallen Wellies"	Alan J. W. Bell	Roy Clarke	23 April 2000
Nora, in "sexy" costume for a church pageant, takes a dare from Ivy to call Compo's bluff and present herself on his doorstep. Compo ends up having a fatal heart attack, passing away in the hospital. As everyone mourns, Truly comes up with a way for them all to say farewell.
187	"Surprise at Throstlenest"	Alan J. W. Bell	Roy Clarke	30 April 2000
Clegg and Truly find out a few unexpected things about Compo as they take his ferrets to their new home.
188	"Just a Small Funeral"	Alan J. W. Bell	Roy Clarke	7 May 2000
As the funeral approaches, Compo's lady friend Regina is in desperate need of an appropriate dress.
189	"From Here to Paternity"	Alan J. W. Bell	Roy Clarke	14 May 2000
Nora intercepts a letter from Compo's son, Tom, whom Compo didn't know about until shortly before he died.
190	"Some Vans Can Make You Deaf"	Alan J. W. Bell	Roy Clarke	21 May 2000
While others unite in the effort to repair his tatty van, Tom does his best to avoid lifting a finger to help.
191	"Waggoner's Roll"	Alan J. W. Bell	Roy Clarke	28 May 2000
Tom manages to get his niece, Babs, on the road to stardom with a lunchtime booking at a pub.
192	"I Didn't Know Barry Could Play"	Alan J. W. Bell	Roy Clarke	4 June 2000
Picking up "music" for Babs turns out to be a deceptively simple-sounding task for Clegg, Truly and Barry.

=== Series 22 (2001) ===
No.	Title	Directed by	Written by	Original release date
193	"Getting Barry's Goat"	Alan J. W. Bell	Roy Clarke	1 April 2001
Barry tries to return Tom's goat after it has been left in his garage.
194	"The Art of the Shorts Story"	Alan J. W. Bell	Roy Clarke	8 April 2001
Howard gets into a panic when he cannot find his shorts and is questioned about them by Pearl.
195	"The Missing Bus of Mrs. Avery"	Alan J. W. Bell	Roy Clarke	15 April 2001
Howard is cheerful and Pearl is suspicious. Mrs. Avery is flustered to drive the ladies on their outing.
196	"Hey! Big Vendor"	Alan J. W. Bell	Roy Clarke	22 April 2001
Wesley's latest invention should prove a big hit at the jumble sale, if only the rude noises it makes could be quietened down!
197	"Enter the Hawk"	Alan J. W. Bell	Roy Clarke	29 April 2001
Barry is interested in a pinstripe suit that he feels will help him look like managerial material.
198	"Gnome and Away"	Alan J. W. Bell	Roy Clarke	6 May 2001
Howard recruits Truly and Clegg to hide his latest gift for Marina until he can give it to her. Norman Wisdom makes a cameo in the final scene.
199	"A Hair of the Blonde That Bit You"	Alan J. W. Bell	Roy Clarke	13 May 2001
Pearl finds a single blonde hair on one of Howard's shirts.
200	"A White Sweater and a Solicitor's Letter"	Alan J. W. Bell	Roy Clarke	20 May 2001
A solicitor's letter arrives, addressed to Compo. Is it good or bad news?
201	"Why Is Barry at an Angle?"	Alan J. W. Bell	Roy Clarke	27 May 2001
Barry has the undesirable task of collecting on a customer's late payment.
202	"The Coming of the Beast"	Alan J. W. Bell	Roy Clarke	3 June 2001
Wesley's new toy gives Barry a chance to prove his usefulness in overalls. And apparently there's a tiger on the loose.

=== Series 23 (2001–2002) ===
No.	Title	Directed by	Written by	Original release date
Christmas special
203	"Potts in Pole Position"	Alan J. W. Bell	Roy Clarke	30 December 2001
Truly, Clegg and Billy meet a polar explorer with a domineering wife.
Regular series
204	"A Brief Excursion in the Fast Lane"	Alan J. W. Bell	Roy Clarke	6 January 2002
Glenda begins to worry when Barry becomes interested in a life in the fast lane.
205	"The Mystical Squeak of Howard's Bicycle"	Alan J. W. Bell	Roy Clarke	13 January 2002
Howard seeks a way to deal with a psychic phenomenon.
206	"Mervyn Would Be Proud"	Alan J. W. Bell	Roy Clarke	20 January 2002
A dedicated groupie follows Billy, who stages a moving demonstration of his inherited skill with a bow and arrow.
207	"The Incredible Ordeal of Norman Clegg"	Alan J. W. Bell	Roy Clarke	27 January 2002
When Howard leaves some picnic items at Clegg's for safekeeping he fails to mention that it includes Marina.
208	"Beware of the Hot Dog"	Alan J. W. Bell	Roy Clarke	3 February 2002
Wesley brings culinary ingenuity to the Yorkshire wilderness as Howard decides to surveil Pearl and Ros during their day out.
209	"In Search of Childlike Joy and the Farthest..."	Alan J. W. Bell	Roy Clarke	10 February 2002
Both a reluctant Smiler and the police feel the need for speed, and Barry's legs may hold the key to the trio's enlightenment.
210	"A Chaise Longue Too Far"	Alan J. W. Bell	Roy Clarke	17 February 2002
Barry's rejected romantic gift becomes the only method by which Howard can counter Marina's ultimatum.
211	"Exercising Father's Bicycle"	Alan J. W. Bell	Roy Clarke	24 February 2002
After successfully dodging a bill collector, Tom learns of the stories past of Compo's bicycle and wishes to help the legend live on.
212	"Sadly, Madly, Bradley"	Alan J. W. Bell	Roy Clarke	3 March 2002
Billy must spend the day with his brother-in-law Bradley, who can't stop spreading around his gloomy mood.
213	"It All Began with an Old Volvo Headlamp"	Alan J. W. Bell	Roy Clarke	10 March 2002
The trio latches on to the distraught Kevin, who in response to his being dumped by his girlfriend, wants to become a "Wise Man of the Woods". This was the last episode to feature Gordon Wharmby as Wesley Pegden.

=== Series 24 (2002–2003) ===
No.	Title	Directed by	Written by	Original release date
Christmas special
214	"A Musical Passing for a Miserable Muscroft"	Alan J. W. Bell	Roy Clarke	29 December 2002
Billy Ingleton has acquired a mobile pipe organ, the use of which the ladies feel appropriate for a charity pageant.
Regular series
215	"The Lair of the Cat Creature"	Alan J. W. Bell	Roy Clarke	5 January 2003
A new adventurer lands in town, eager to make a name for himself; luckily for him, the trio has in mind a heroic test of mettle.
216	"Ancient Eastern Wisdom: An Introduction"	Alan J. W. Bell	Roy Clarke	12 January 2003
Truly and Clegg meet an inscrutable bearer of ancient Eastern wisdom whom they recruit to help Tom deal with the repo man.
217	"A Pick-Up of the Later Ming Dynasty"	Alan J. W. Bell	Roy Clarke	19 January 2003
After helping Entwistle fix his truck, the trio are recruited to lay hands on Smiler's cart.
218	"The Secret Birthday of Norman Clegg"	Alan J. W. Bell	Roy Clarke	26 January 2003
Clegg wants to celebrate his birthday with a quiet lunch with Truly at a posh hotel, but Marina invites herself on the way. They then discover that everybody else is at a wedding reception – at the same hotel.
219	"In Which Gavin Hinchcliffe Loses the Gulf Stream"	Alan J. W. Bell	Roy Clarke	2 February 2003
An old schoolmate's preparations for global warming are hampered by a drunk girlfriend and one very nervous driver.
220	"The Miraculous Curing of Old Goff Helliwell"	Alan J. W. Bell	Roy Clarke	9 February 2003
Clegg, Truly and Billy need to put a spark back in the life of an old chum.
221	"The Frenchies Are Coming"	Alan J. W. Bell	Roy Clarke	23 February 2003
Billy assembles a band of archers to defend against French invaders, and Pearl finds a way to keep tabs on Howard's comings and goings.
222	"The Man Who Invented Yorkshire Funny Stuff"	Alan J. W. Bell	Roy Clarke	2 March 2003
The trio are on the hunt for a green-fingered man whose reputation as a ladies' man has bred contempt among his old flames.
223	"The Second Husband and the Showgirls"	Alan J. W. Bell	Roy Clarke	9 March 2003
Curiosity abounds when the new husband of the former Mrs. Truelove arrives in town.
224	"All of a Florrie"	Alan J. W. Bell	Roy Clarke	16 March 2003
Everyone lends a hand in helping Truly rid himself of an old next-door neighbour with misguided affections. This was the last episode to feature Dame Thora Hird as Edie Pegden.

=== Series 25 (2003–2004) ===
No.	Title	Directed by	Written by	Original release date
Christmas special
225	"A Short Blast of Fred Astaire"	Alan J. W. Bell	Roy Clarke	21 December 2003
Preparations for the Christmas concert are in full swing, but some of the assembled acts lack confidence.
Regular series
226	"Jurassic – No Parking"	Alan J. W. Bell	Roy Clarke	8 February 2004
Barry wins a contest and receives more prize than Glenda can handle.
227	"The General's Greatest Battle"	Alan J. W. Bell	Roy Clarke	15 February 2004
Clegg, Truly, and the others end up destroying a mannequin that is supposed to ride with Nora in the holiday float.
228	"Spores"	Alan J. W. Bell	Roy Clarke	29 February 2004
Truly and Billy aid a woman in finding her "Lionel" while Alvin tries to get a photograph of Nora Batty.
229	"Happy Birthday Robin Hood"	Alan J. W. Bell	Roy Clarke	7 March 2004
When he sees Marina wearing a wedding dress and being driven through town, Howard becomes distraught.
230	"Who's That with Barry and Glenda?"	Alan J. W. Bell	Roy Clarke	14 March 2004
Glenda is concerned about Barry and his suitcase, and decides to follow him to see whether another woman is involved.
231	"An Apple a Day"	Alan J. W. Bell	Roy Clarke	21 March 2004
Nora Batty informs Alvin that he has volunteered to take some old-timers out for the day.
232	"Barry Becomes a Psychopathic Killer"	Alan J. W. Bell	Roy Clarke	28 March 2004
Smiler needs to get rid of an unwanted admirer who thinks he has money. Clegg, and then Barry, are recruited to dampen her enthusiasm.
233	"Things To Do When Your Wife Runs Off..."	Alan J. W. Bell	Roy Clarke	4 April 2004
Barry unwittingly becomes the friend of a lonely man whose wife has deserted him.
234	"Beware of Laughing at Nora's Hats"	Alan J. W. Bell	Roy Clarke	11 April 2004
Clegg, Truly, Alvin and Billy unite to help end a long running feud between Nora and Audrey Craig.
235	"Yours Truly – If You're Not Careful"	Alan J. W. Bell	Roy Clarke	18 April 2004
Truly thinks his ex-wife "The former Mrs Truelove" is keen to get in touch with him and visit.

=== Series 26 (2004–2005) ===
Episodes in Series 26 were broadcast out of sequence. "Who's That Mouse in the Poetry Group?" was due to be broadcast on 3 April 2005, but was postponed to 17 April 2005, due to a last-minute schedule change. "Hermione (the Short Course)" was broadcast as originally planned on 10 April 2005, as the TV listings magazines had already been published for that week's programmes.

No.	Title	Directed by	Written by	Original release date
Christmas special
236	"Variations on a Theme of the Widow Winstanley"	Alan J. W. Bell	Roy Clarke	19 December 2004
Truly, Alvin, and Billy Hardcastle scheme to match the notoriously woman-shy Clegg up with a widow.
Regular series
237	"The Swan Man of Ilkley"	Alan J. W. Bell	Roy Clarke	13 March 2005
A stranger is planning to float to Ilkley using an inflatable swan and it's up to Entwistle to ensure the man completes his journey.
238	"Watching the Clock"	Alan J. W. Bell	Roy Clarke	20 March 2005
Clegg climbs an old tree to prove that the town clock from a nearby village can be seen from its height. scared of heights, Truly, Alvin, Billy and Howard have to get him down.
239	"Has Anyone Seen a Peruvian Wart?"	Alan J. W. Bell	Roy Clarke	27 March 2005
Nora Batty finds herself the target of a notorious womaniser after she garners his attention with her baked goods.
240	"Hermione (The Short Course)"	Alan J. W. Bell	Roy Clarke	10 April 2005
A "Do Not Disturb" sign on Clegg's door rouses curiosity and worry among his friends; Smiler finds himself yearning for a lost love
241	"Who's That Mouse in the Poetry Group?"	Alan J. W. Bell	Roy Clarke	17 April 2005
In an attempt to improve his appeal, Smiler transforms himself into an "intellectual" to both Marina's delight and Howard's chagrin.
242	"Available for Weddings"	Alan J. W. Bell	Roy Clarke	24 April 2005
After Clegg breaks his leg attempting a steep hill, the Yorkshire countryside becomes a test track for Truly's experimental studded bicycle tyres.
243	"The McDonaghs of Jamieson Street"	Alan J. W. Bell	Roy Clarke	1 May 2005
When Smiler tells the boys about the "girl who got away", they along with Nora, Glenda and Tom venture out to track her down and play Cupid.
244	"The Afterthoughts of a Co-op Manager"	Alan J. W. Bell	Roy Clarke	8 May 2005
Truly heads a search for a manager Clegg worked under in his youth, finding that even the tyrannous can harbour virtue.
245	"Lot Number 8"	Alan J. W. Bell	Roy Clarke	15 May 2005
Auntie Wainwright acquires a mystery Lot (four useful containers) at an auction and sends Tom and Smiler to pick it up. Truly, Billy, Alvin and Entwhistle try to find a use for the "Containers" other than their intended one.
246	"Little Orphan Howard"	Alan J. W. Bell	Roy Clarke	29 May 2005
Howard falls into a depression after Clegg devilishly convinces him that he's an orphan.

=== Series 27 (2005–2006) ===
No.	Title	Directed by	Written by	Original release date
Christmas special
247	"Merry Entwistle and Jackson Day"	Alan J. W. Bell	Roy Clarke	18 December 2005
Auntie Wainwright dresses Smiler as Father Christmas and Tom as an elf.
Regular series
248	"Follow That Bottle"	Alan J. W. Bell	Roy Clarke	5 March 2006
Intrigued by a note in a bottle floating down the river, Clegg, Truly, Billy and Alvin recruit Entwistle to help them intercept it.
249	"How to Remove a Cousin"	Alan J. W. Bell	Roy Clarke	12 March 2006
Truly, Billy and Alvin join forces to help Clegg encourage his overbearing cousin to go home.
250	"Has Anyone Seen Barry's Midlife Crisis?"	Alan J. W. Bell	Roy Clarke	19 March 2006
As Barry frets to Glenda about wanting a mid-life crisis, the foursome attempts to break Howard out of his 24-hour house arrest.
251	"The Genuine Outdoors Robin Hood Barbi"	Alan J. W. Bell	Roy Clarke	26 March 2006
Billy's expertise in all things outdoors is called into question, and Barry acquires the services of Tom and Smiler in an attempt to impress the Captain.
252	"Barry in Danger from Reading and Aunt Jessie"	Alan J. W. Bell	Roy Clarke	2 April 2006
Alvin devises a scheme to spark Nora's jealousy; meanwhile, Barry's trip to the library might end up put him off reading entirely.
253	"Who's That Merry Man with Billy, Then?"	Alan J. W. Bell	Roy Clarke	9 April 2006
Billy is excited after learning he has recruited a new member for his Merry Men
254	"Who's That Talking to Lenny?"	Alan J. W. Bell	Roy Clarke	16 April 2006
Lenny hears a voice from above and decides he must wait patiently for more information. The gang makes sure he is well equipped to receive messages.
255	"Oh Look! Mitzi's Found Her Mummy"	Alan J. W. Bell	Roy Clarke	23 April 2006
Howard agrees to look after a friend's dog but soon passes the job on to Clegg, in whose hands the dog inexplicably becomes ferocious.
256	"Plenty of Room in the Back"	Alan J. W. Bell	Roy Clarke	30 April 2006
When Smiler and Tom go to collect Auntie Wainright's new company vehicle, they find it certainly has "plenty of room in the back". But is it really up to the job? This is the last episode with Keith Clifford as Billy Hardcastle.
Christmas special
257	"A Tale of Two Sweaters"	Alan J. W. Bell	Roy Clarke	28 December 2006
When Howard is given sweaters by both Pearl and Marina he is forced to master the art of quick changing in order to stay out of trouble.

=== Series 28 (2007) ===
No.	Title	Directed by	Written by	Original release date
258	"The Second Stag Night of Doggy Wilkinson"	Alan J. W. Bell	Roy Clarke	15 July 2007
An old friend – Doggy – is getting remarried and invites Clegg, Truly, Alvin, Entwistle and Howard to his stag night at a local inn.
259	"What Happened to the Horse?"	Alan J. W. Bell	Roy Clarke	29 July 2007
When Alvin observes that a particular strip of woodland looks as if it could be haunted, they soon convince him of its authenticity.
260	"Variations on a Theme of Road Rage"	Alan J. W. Bell	Roy Clarke	5 August 2007
Howard purchases a used car, not knowing that the previous owner still has a claim to it.
261	"In Which Howard Gets Double Booked"	Alan J. W. Bell	Roy Clarke	12 August 2007
Howard agrees to take Pearl out on the same night that he's promised to take Marina out as well.
262	"Will the Nearest Alien Please Come In"	Alan J. W. Bell	Roy Clarke	19 August 2007
Truly and Alvin look for alien life.
263	"Elegy for Small Creature and Clandestine Trackbike"	Alan J. W. Bell	Roy Clarke	26 August 2007
Clegg reluctantly agrees to let Howard bring his new bicycle in to his house out of sight from Pearl, but is dismayed when he finds that it is a track bike.
264	"The Crowcroft Challenge"	Alan J. W. Bell	Roy Clarke	2 September 2007
Alvin and Howard agree to take up the Crowcroft Challenge, not realizing what it entails.
265	"Must Be Good Dancer"	Alan J. W. Bell	Roy Clarke	9 September 2007
Alvin, Tom and Truly try to persuade Smiler to dance.
266	"In Which Howard Remembers Where He Left His Bicycle Pump"	Alan J. W. Bell	Roy Clarke	16 September 2007
Howard bumps into an old flame.
267	"Sinclair and the Wormley Witches"	Alan J. W. Bell	Roy Clarke	23 September 2007
Sinclair wants to be exorcised but doesn't bargain for Smiler doing the exorcising. This is the last episode with Stephen Lewis as Smiler.

=== Series 29 (2008) ===
No.	Title	Directed by	Written by	Original release date
268	"Enter the Finger"	Alan J. W. Bell	Roy Clarke	22 June 2008
Barry's fitness-mad neighbour annoyingly outshines him in all things physical.
269	"Will the Genuine Racer Please Stand Up?"	Alan J. W. Bell	Roy Clarke	29 June 2008
Howard decides to disguise himself from Pearl but discovers it is not as easy as he thought.
270	"A Short Introduction to Cooper's Rules"	Alan J. W. Bell	Roy Clarke	6 July 2008
Just as PCs Cooper and Walsh master the art of fighting crime from the rear, Barry spoils it all by taking a retired vicar out for the day.
271	"Is Jeremy Quite Safe?"	Alan J. W. Bell	Roy Clarke	13 July 2008
A retired jewel thief regales Marina and Miss Davenport with fanciful stories of his past exploits in the South of France.
272	"All That Glitters Is Not Elvis"	Alan J. W. Bell	Roy Clarke	20 July 2008
When Alvin and Entwistle see Lance trying to convince his wife that Elvis is still alive, they feel a duty to help the King make an appearance.
273	"Eva's Back in Town"	Alan J. W. Bell	Roy Clarke	27 July 2008
Eva, an old acquaintance of Alvin's makes an appearance, and proves to be just the woman to make Howard's life more complicated.
274	"In Which Romance Isn't Dead – Just Incompetent"	Alan J. W. Bell	Roy Clarke	3 August 2008
Barry has a lonely neighbour on his hands and takes it upon himself to find him a girlfriend.
275	"The Mischievous Tinkle in Howard's Eyes"	Alan J. W. Bell	Roy Clarke	10 August 2008
Howard discovers there are better ways than the mobile phone to contact "certain acquaintances", and quite openly, too – morris dancing bells.
276	"Of Passion and Pizza"	Alan J. W. Bell	Roy Clarke	17 August 2008
Mervyn is deeply in love with 'Her' at the pizza take-away, but lacking the courage to tell her himself.
277	"It's Never Ten Years"	Alan J. W. Bell	Roy Clarke	24 August 2008
Clegg and Truly reminisce fondly about their old friend Compo, who suffered at the hands of Nora Batty – and them, thus teaching Alvin a thing or two. This episode features clips from earlier episodes with Compo.
278	"Get Out of That, Then"	Alan J. W. Bell	Roy Clarke	31 August 2008
Lenny, heavily-chained, is determined that he has a showbusiness future as an escapologist. Sidekick Cliff is not as enthusiastic. This was the last episode to feature Kathy Staff as Nora Batty.

=== Series 30 (2008–2009) ===
No.	Title	Directed by	Written by	Original release date
New Year's special
279	"I Was a Hitman for Primrose Dairies"	Alan J. W. Bell	Roy Clarke	31 December 2008
Retired milkman Luther 'Hobbo' Hobdyke calls upon his MI5 experience to form a band of reluctant volunteers, to react to any emergency.
Regular series
280	"Adventures of the Inventor of the Mother Stitch"	Alan J. W. Bell	Roy Clarke	19 April 2009
Hobbo discovers that Morton is lonely and depressed, what else should a former milkman and undercover spy do, but find him a good friend.
281	"The Mother of All Mistakes—Or Is It?"	Alan J. W. Bell	Roy Clarke	26 April 2009
Adopted as a baby, former milkman and undercover secret agent Hobbo is determined to trace his natural mother.
282	"Will Howard Cross the Atlantic Single Handed?"	Alan J. W. Bell	Roy Clarke	3 May 2009
Hobbo is still having trouble getting Nelly to admit that she is his natural birth mother.
283	"Who's That Looking Sideways at Nelly?"	Alan J. W. Bell	Roy Clarke	10 May 2009
Hobbo discovers the danger of exercising when his neck locks solid while doing some simple head movements.
284	"Nobody Messes with Tony the Throat"	Alan J. W. Bell	Roy Clarke	17 May 2009
Howard is deeply concerned when Pearl starts going out every day with Nelly, and she will not say where.
285	"Will Stella Find True Love with Norris Fairburn?"	Alan J. W. Bell	Roy Clarke	24 May 2009
When Clegg and Truly tell Hobbo that local serial groom Norris Fairburn is free again, he decides that Norris would be an ideal husband for Stella.
286	"Will Randolph Make a Good Impression?"	Alan J. W. Bell	Roy Clarke	31 May 2009
Hobbo turns up at the river wall with Randolph, who he hopes will bring romance into Stella's life.
287	"In Which Romance Springs a Leak"	Alan J. W. Bell	Roy Clarke	7 June 2009
Toby is beginning to realise that the benefits of going back to his ex-wife far outweigh the advantages of living alone.
288	"Variations on a Theme of Father's Day"	Alan J. W. Bell	Roy Clarke	14 June 2009
In order that Hobbo can find out more about Nelly, his supposed mother, he has Howard eavesdrop on her when she is visiting Pearl.
289	"Goodnight Sweet Ferret"	Alan J. W. Bell	Roy Clarke	21 June 2009
Hobbo and his army of volunteers, namely Alvin and Entwistle, go and visit an old friend who needs help.

=== Series 31 (2010) ===
No.	Title	Directed by	Written by	Original release date
290	"Behind Every Bush There Is Not Necessarily a Howard"	Alan J. W. Bell	Roy Clarke	25 July 2010
Hobbo enlists the services of his 'team' to help Toby win back the affections of his ex-wife.
291	"Happy Camping"	Alan J. W. Bell	Roy Clarke	1 August 2010
Pearl throws Howard out of the house, but when he goes to Clegg's for sympathy it falls on deaf ears.
292	"The Rights of Man (Except for Howard)"	Alan J. W. Bell	Roy Clarke	8 August 2010
Hobbo decides that the still-homeless Howard needs to show Pearl who's boss, but after Pearl slams the door in his face, Howard is despondent.
293	"Howard and the Great Outdoors"	Alan J. W. Bell	Roy Clarke	15 August 2010
Attempting to persuade Pearl to take her errant husband back, Howard's friends try to convince her he has become a tramp.
294	"Look Whose Wheel's Come Off"	Alan J. W. Bell	Roy Clarke	22 August 2010
Wondering whether Pearl still loves him, Howard asks Hobbo to give her a peck on the cheek from him.
295	"How Not to Cry at Weddings"	Alan J. W. Bell	Roy Clarke	29 August 2010
Alvin flirts with Stella, Toby tries to smarten himself up in a bid to win back Monica, and Clegg worries that he's forgotten something important.

== Miscellaneous ==
=== Shorts ===
No.	Title	Directed by	Written by	Original release date
The Val Doonican Music Show
—	"Val's Christmas Music Show"	Ernest Maxin	Barry Took, Val Doonican	24 December 1979
Compo, Clegg, Foggy and Ivy attend Val Doonican's music show to watch his singing.
The Kids International Show
—	"The Kids International Show, Episode 1.1"	Ernest Maxin	Roy Clarke	31 May 1982
Compo, Clegg and Foggy attend a show to see a group of international children as well as The Three Degrees.
The Funny Side of Christmas
—	"How to Ignore Christmas"	Sydney Lotterby	Roy Clarke	27 December 1982
Clegg and Foggy are determined to avoid Christmas joys and so pretend it is November, but Compo is reluctant and even brings three women around as a Christmas treat.
Royal Variety Performance
—	"Royal Variety"	Ronnie Hazlehurst	Roy Clarke	25 November 1984
Live short with Clegg, Foggy and Compo. Foggy fixes Compo’s trousers.
That's Television Entertainment
—	"That's Television Entertainment"	n/a	n/a	1 November 1986
Compo, Clegg and Foggy appear in a short segment from a celebratory montage of BBC comedy legends.
Noel's House Party special
—	"Japanese Hand Grenade"	Michael Leggo	Roy Clarke	5 December 1992
Short with Clegg and Compo. Clegg recounts an incident with Eli and a grenade.
—	"Last of the Blobby Wine"	Michael Leggo	Roy Clarke	1994
Short with Nora Batty and Compo on a trip out.
Children in Need special
—	"The Batsman: A Shaggy Dog Story"	n/a	n/a	27 December 1999
Norman Clegg joins a collection of a comedy characters to tell a story of the batsman. (This was not written by Roy Clarke.)
The Paul O'Grady Show special
—	"The Bill for the Summer Wine"	Unknown	Paul O'Grady and Harry Hill	15 November 2010
Features the return of Alvin and Entwistle, as well as guest starring Graham Cole as Tony Stamp and Paul O'Grady and Harry Hill as themselves.
Cooper and Walsh
—	"Cooper and Walsh"	Alan J. W. Bell	Roy Clarke	2014
A short filmed pilot for "Cooper & Walsh", which was released online and starred Ken Kitson and Louis Emerick as PCs Cooper and Walsh. It was released to promote the idea of a full series being commissioned.
—	"The Guardians of the Law"	Alan J. W. Bell	Roy Clarke	2014
The second filmed short for "Cooper & Walsh". It was released online; it starred Ken Kitson and Louis Emerick as PC Cooper and PC Walsh.
—	"Under Fire"	Alan J. W. Bell	Roy Clarke	2014
The third filmed pilot for "Cooper & Walsh". It was released online; it starred Ken Kitson and Louis Emerick as PC Cooper and PC Walsh.

=== Documentaries ===
No.	Title	Directed by	Written by	Original release date	Duration
—	"Blue Peter, S32.E29"	Unknown	John Hunter Blair	19 December 1988	30 minutes
An interview with Bill Owen, Peter Sallis, Michael Aldridge and Kathy Staff about their experiences working on the series.
—	"25 Years of Last of the Summer Wine"	Alan J. W. Bell	Unknown	30 March 1997	50 minutes
Documentary looking back at 25 years of Yorkshire-based tomfoolery in Last of the Summer Wine.
—	"30 Years of Last of the Summer Wine"	Alan J. W. Bell	Unknown	13 April 2003	60 minutes
A celebration of the world's longest-running comedy series.
—	"The World's Greatest Comedy Characters"	Alice Barnett, Tania Hirsch and Grainne Jordan	Ged Parsons	14 April 2007	185 minutes
A look at some of the world's greatest comedy characters ever created.
—	"The Greatest Christmas Comedy Moments"	Sasha Brogden	Unknown	21 December 2008	180 minutes
A compilation of clips, from British rib-tickling comedy sketches to farcical sitcoms.

== Notes ==
- The DVD boxset issued on this date is labelled series 9 & 10. However, it contains only the twelve episodes listed for series 9 below plus the three Specials. It contains none of the episodes listed for series 10. The six series 10 episodes were released along with the seven of series 11 and two Specials in a boxset labelled Series 11 & 12. The ten Series 12 episodes were released along with the six Series 13 episodes and two Specials in another boxset labelled series 13 & 14. The nine series 14 episodes were released along with the nine series 15 episodes and two specials in another boxset labelled series 15 & 16 released on 26 October 2009. The eight series 16 episodes were released along with the ten series 17 episodes and two specials in another boxset labelled series 17 & 18 released on 27 December 2010. The ten series 18 episodes were released along with the ten series 19 episodes and two specials in another boxset labelled series 19 & 20 on 7 February 2011. The ten series 20 episodes were released along with the ten series 21 episodes and the Millennium special in another boxset labelled series 21 & 22 on 26 March 2012. The ten series 22 episodes were released along with the ten series 23 episodes and two specials in another boxset labelled series 23 & 24 on 23 April 2012. The ten series 24 episodes were released along with the ten series 25 episodes and two specials in another boxset labelled series 25 & 26 on 29 September 2014. The ten series 26 episodes were released along with the nine series 27 episodes and two specials in another boxset labelled series 27 & 28 on 5 October 2015. The ten series 28 episodes were released along with the eleven series 29 episodes in another boxset labeled series 29 & 30 on 16 May 2016. The ten series 30 episodes were released along with the six series 31, the 2008 New Year special and an extra feature of the Comedy Playhouse Pilot episode of Funerals and Fish in a final boxset labelled series 31 & 32 on 15 August 2016. All 295 episodes were cleared by the BBFC.
- The first three episodes of series 1 were edited together on the DVD in what appeared to be a straight transfer from the video release in the 1980s. "Pâté and Chips" ended with credits for all three episodes plus the original BBC Video ident; however, a re-release of series 1 & 2 in 2011 put all three episodes with their start and end credits back on them, on the same re-release the scene from the series 2 episode "Some Enchanted Evening" which was missing on the original release has been put back into the episode. Over the years there has been a number of edits on DVD releases in all regions with region 1 having certain music edits on the DVD releases. Region 2 DVDs have some edits such as Milburn not appearing in "The Loxley Lozenge" as he did on original transmission and "Uncle of the Bride" and "Big Day at Dream Acres" on the DVD release being only 1 of 3 versions of each episode, "Elegy for Fallen Wellies" on the region 2 DVDs is the alternate version on DVD and not the original transmission version, another episode edited was on the re-release of series 3 & 4 in 2010 when a line was removed from "The Kink in Foggy's Niblick" when the lady golfers go walking past Compo and Clegg. Apart from "Elegy for Fallen Wellies" there doesn't appear to be much editing on the later releases in region 2. A scene with Milburn and Pearl in the cafe is also cut from the series 8 episode "Catching Digyby's Donkey", which is present on the region 1 DVD release.
