= Last of the Summer Wine series 20 =

Last of the Summer Wine
- Series 20
- No. of episodes: 10

Release
- Original network: BBC One
- Original release: 18 April – 27 June 1999

Additional information
- Filming dates: Series 20: 1998–1999

Season chronology
- ← Previous; 19 Next → 21

The twentieth series of Last of the Summer Wine aired on BBC One. All of the episodes were written by Roy Clarke, and produced and directed by Alan J. W. Bell.

== Characters ==
The trio in this series consisted of Compo (Bill Owen), Clegg (Peter Sallis) and Truly (Frank Thornton). Billy Hardcastle (1999–2006) makes his first appearance in this series.

== Episodes ==
No. overall	No. in series	Title	Original release date	Notes
172	1	"The Pony Set"	18 April 1999	This is the first episode to be made in 16:9 widescreen.; Audience of 8.4m – 30th most watched programme of the week.; Guest appearance of Malcolm Hebden.
Compo decides to take up horse riding to impress Nora Batty, and it's up to Clegg and Truly to help him thanks to Auntie Wainwright's special horse-riding promotion. On their way to Wainwright's, the trio come across a man intending to 'end it all' because of problems with his wife.
173	2	"How Errol Flynn Discovered the Secret Scar of Nora Batty"	25 April 1999	First appearance of Billy Hardcastle (guest star).; Audience of 7.76m – 32nd most watched programme of the week.
The trio come across Billy Hardcastle, a man who believes he is a direct descendant of Robin Hood and takes up dressing like his "ancestor" and recruit a band of Merry Men, but when Compo sees Nora fussing over him, he decides to take matters into his own hands.
174	3	"Who's Thrown Away Her Tom Cruise Photographs?"	2 May 1999	Audience of 6.22m – 47th most watched programme of the week.
Marina finally gets fed up with Howard and swears off men entirely. Truly thinks he can change her mind if only they can make Howard appear more desirable.
175	4	"What's Happened to Barry's Nose?"	16 May 1999	Audience of 6.52m – 47th most watched programme of the week.
Truly tries to help Barry become more confident, but things turn nasty leading to some damage to Barry's nose. Meanwhile, Howard and Marina buy megaphones from Auntie Wainwright.
176	5	"Optimism in the Housing Market"	23 May 1999	Audience of 6.95m – 43rd most watched programme of the week.
Smiler injures his foot while selling door to door for Auntie Wainwright. The trio tries to assist him in recovering from his injury, with disastrous results.
177	6	"Will Barry Go Septic Despite Listening to Classical Music?"	30 May 1999	Guest appearance of Colin Bennett; Audience of 7.21m – 17th most watched programme of the week.
Compo, Clegg and Truly are intrigued when they meet a man testing for earthquakes.
178	7	"Beware the Vanilla Slice"	6 June 1999	Audience of 6.98m – 31st most watched programme of the week.
Compo tries to revive interest in the childhood game of "thumpy-dub", Truly tries to sell his useless lawn-mower and Marina generates gossip with her pastry purchase.
179	8	"Howard Throws a Wobbler"	13 June 1999	Audience of 6.37m – 37th most watched programme of the week.
Howard seethes with jealousy when he becomes positive that Pearl is having an affair. Eager to show off his detective skills, Truly volunteers to shadow her and find out what she's up to.
180	9	"The Phantom Number 14 Bus"	20 June 1999	Audience of 7.46m – 48th most watched programme of the week.; Guest appearance of Stanley Lebor.
Truly investigates the curious case of 'The Phantom Number 14 Bus' which disappeared between stops.
181	10	"Ironing Day"	27 June 1999	Audience of 7.22m – 27th most watched programme of the week.
Smiler gets drunk and adventurous on Auntie Wainwright's homemade wine, and Truly and Compo attempt to keep him under control.
TBA	Special	"The Batsman"	1999	Audience of 6 million; Shown as a promotion for comedy on the BBC
A selection of many famous comedy characters telling the story of the Batsman, this included Norman Clegg as portrayed by Peter Sallis.

== DVD release ==
The box set for series twenty was released by Universal Playback in March 2012, mislabelled as a box set for series 21 & 22.

The Complete Series 21 & 22
Set Details
- 21 episodes
- 4-disc set
- Language: English
Release Date
Region 2
26 March 2012

== See also ==
- List of Last of the Summer Wine episodes
