= Last of the Summer Wine series 23 =

Last of the Summer Wine
- Series 23
- No. of episodes: 11

Release
- Original network: BBC One
- Original release: 30 December 2001 – 10 March 2002

Additional information
- Filming dates: Christmas special: 2001; Series 23: 2001

Season chronology
- ← Previous; 22 Next → 24

The twenty-third series of Last of the Summer Wine aired on BBC One. All of the episodes were written by Roy Clarke, and produced and directed by Alan J. W. Bell.

== Characters ==
The trio in this series consisted of Clegg (Peter Sallis), Truly (Frank Thornton) and Billy (Keith Clifford). Wesley Pegden (1982, 1984–2002) and Eli Duckett (1987–2002) appear for the final time.

== Episodes ==
| No. overall | No. in series | Title | Original release date | Notes |
|---|---|---|---|---|
| 203 | Christmas–Special | "Potts in Pole Position" | 30 December 2001 | June Whitfield makes a guest appearance in this episode, before joining the cast (in a different role) in Series 27. Warren Mitchell also made an appearance in the episode as Whitfield's husband.; Audience of 6.93 million – 44th most watched programme of the week. |
| 204 | 1 | "A Brief Excursion in the Fast Lane" | 6 January 2002 | Final appearance of Eli. Danny O'Dea left the show owing to ill health and died a year after this episode was broadcast.; Audience of 5.20m – 54th most watched programme of the week. |
Glenda begins to worry when Barry becomes interested in a life in the fast lane.
| 205 | 2 | "The Mystical Squeak of Howard's Bicycle" | 13 January 2002 | Audience of 6.09m – 34th most watched programme of the week. |
Billy and Truly compete to prove who has the keener "sixth sense" and Howard seeks a way to deal with his own psychic phenomenon.
| 206 | 3 | "Mervyn Would Be Proud" | 20 January 2002 | Audience of 6.48m – 31st most watched programme of the week. |
A dedicated groupie follows Billy, who stages a moving demonstration of his inherited skill with a bow and arrow.
| 207 | 4 | "The Incredible Ordeal of Norman Clegg" | 27 January 2002 | Audience of 5.36m – 52nd most watched programme of the week.; Guest appearance of Eli Woods and James Casey as drunks. |
When Howard leaves some picnic items at Clegg's for safekeeping he fails to mention that it includes Marina. Truly and Billy work to help Clegg get Marina out while Howard is next door at the ladies coffee morning – refusing to leave!
| 208 | 5 | "Beware of the Hot Dog" | 3 February 2002 | Nora Batty's absence is explained by her leaving to visit relatives in Australia; the episode opens with a faraway shot of her departing for the airport.; Audience of 6.62m – 32nd most watched programme of the week. |
Wesley brings culinary ingenuity to the Yorkshire wilderness as Howard decides to surveil Pearl and Ros during their day out.
| 209 | 6 | "In Search of Childlike Joy and the Farthest Reaches of the Lotus Position" | 10 February 2002 | Audience of 6.29m – 30th most watched programme of the week. |
Both a reluctant Smiler and the police feel the need for speed, and Barry's legs may hold the key to the trio's enlightenment.
| 210 | 7 | "A Chaise Longue Too Far" | 17 February 2002 | Audience of 5m – approximately 53rd most watched programme of the week. |
Barry's rejected romantic gift becomes the only method by which Howard can counter Marina's ultimatum.
| 211 | 8 | "Exercising Father's Bicycle" | 24 February 2002 | Audience of 4.82m – approximately 55th most watched programme of the week. |
After successfully dodging a bill collector, Tom learns of the storied past of Compo's bicycle and wishes to help the legend live on.
| 212 | 9 | "Sadly, Madly, Bradley" | 3 March 2002 | Audience of 5.37m – 50th most watched programme of the week. |
Billy must spend the day with his brother-in-law Bradley, who can't stop spreading around his gloomy mood. With the help of Tom, Smiler, and a raft the trio try to get him out of the doldrums.
| 213 | 10 | "It All Began with an Old Volvo Headlamp" | 10 March 2002 | Final appearance of Wesley, owing to Gordon Wharmby's death; he died two months after this episode was broadcast.; Guest appearance of Hywel Bennett.; Achieved an audience of fewer than 4.82m and was below the 56th most watched programme of the week. |
The trio latches on to the distraught Kevin, who in response to his being dumped by his girlfriend, wants to become a "Wise Man of the Woods".

== DVD release ==
The box set for series twenty-three was released by Universal Playback in April 2012, mislabelled as a box set for series 23 & 24.

The Complete Series 23 & 24
Set Details
- 22 episodes
- 4-disc set
- Language: English
Release Date
Region 2
23 April 2012
