= Last of the Summer Wine series 30 =

Last of the Summer Wine
- Series 30
- L to R: Alvin, Entwistle, and Hobbo
- No. of episodes: 11

Release
- Original network: BBC One
- Original release: 31 December 2008 – 21 June 2009

Additional information
- Filming dates: New Year's special: 2008; Series 30: 2008

Series chronology
- ← Previous; 29 Next → 31

The thirtieth series of Last of the Summer Wine originally aired 19 April 2009. All eleven episodes were thirty minutes long. A New Year's special aired on 31 December 2008. All of the episodes were written by Roy Clarke, and directed by Alan J. W. Bell.

This series is notable for forming a new trio composed of Alvin, Entwistle and Hobbo, who was introduced in the New Year's special. Clegg (Peter Sallis) and Truly (Frank Thornton) are now demoted to secondary characters, filmed in studio scenes only owing to the cost of insurance for the actors at their age on location.

== Characters ==
The trio in this series consisted of Alvin (Brian Murphy), Hobbo (Russ Abbot) and Entwistle (Burt Kwouk). This series marks the first appearances of Hobbo Hobdyke (2008–2010) and Stella (2008–2010).

== Episodes ==
No. overall	No. in series	Title	Original release date	Notes
279	NewYear–Special	"I Was a Hitman for Primrose Dairies"	31 December 2008	First appearances of Hobbo and Stella.; This episode sees the introduction of the new trio: Alvin, Entwistle and Hobbo. Clegg and Truly are reduced to secondary characters, and appear only briefly in the episode.; This episode was dedicated to Kathy Staff, who died two weeks before it aired. Her character, Nora Batty, does not appear in this episode. It is explained that she is visiting Australia, and her sister, Stella, is house-sitting for her.; Final New Year's special.; Provisional audience figure of 3.9m.
Retired milkman Luther "Hobbo" Hobdyke calls upon his MI5 experience to form a band of reluctant volunteers, to react to any emergency.
280	1	"Some Adventures of the Inventor of the Mother Stitch"	19 April 2009	-
When Hobbo discovers that the newly divorced Morton is lonely and depressed, what else should a former milkman and undercover spy do, but find him a good friend. Meanwhile, the hapless Barry is also depressed when he finds that Toby, the Golf Captain is moving-in next door, and firmly cements the ill-will that exists between them by smashing his bedside lamp. The situation is set for happy endings all round.
281	2	"The Mother of All Mistakes – Or Is It?"	26 April 2009	-
Adopted as a baby, former milkman and undercover secret agent Hobbo is determined to trace his natural mother. He has found out her name and exactly where she lives, but how should he approach the poor woman to tell her the good news? Meanwhile, Howard is in trouble when Marina, on finding out that he has been making inquiries about another woman, turns up at his house.
282	3	"Will Howard Cross the Atlantic Single Handed?"	3 May 2009	-
Hobbo is still having trouble getting Nelly to admit that she is his natural birth mother. To get the proof he needs, he fits Howard up with an eavesdropping wire to pick up Nelly talking to Pearl. Howard does his best to look inconspicuous, but his rumbling stomach and an electronic fault on his transmitter may scupper his plans.
283	4	"Who's That Looking Sideways at Nelly?"	10 May 2009	Neither Peter Sallis nor Frank Thornton appears in this episode when repeated on U&Drama.
Hobbo, former milkman and undercover agent at Primrose Dairies, is ready for any dangerous situation – and going round telling everyone that Nelly is his mother is one. Another danger arises when he demonstrates his gift of disguise, and finds himself the new recipient of Marina's affections. Hobbo then discovers the danger of exercising when his neck locks solid while doing some simple head movements. This is not only dangerous, but also highly hazardous when trying to sip a pint of beer sideways.
284	5	"Nobody Messes with Tony the Throat"	17 May 2009	-
Howard is deeply concerned when Pearl starts going out every day with Nelly, and she will not say where. Hobbo comes to his aid, and heads a surveillance party to follow Pearl and Nelly. When the women go into a Hell's Angels club, they decide not to be hasty, and confront them later.
285	6	"Will Stella Find True Love with Norris Fairburn?"	24 May 2009	Guest appearance of David Williams reprising his role of Mr. Fairburn.; Williams previously portrayed the forsaken character in the 1983 feature-length episode "Getting Sam Home".
When Clegg and Truly tell Hobbo that local serial groom Norris Fairburn is free again, he decides that Norris would be an ideal husband for Stella. At the cafe, Ivy observes and listens as Hobbo, Alvin and Entwistle discuss their foolproof scheme. Later, Ivy warns Stella about the plot to provide her with one house-trained potential husband. Hobbo and his team return with Norris, but both Stella and Ivy look at him with total disdain. Hobbo decides to save the day, but Stella has other ideas.
286	7	"Will Randolph Make a Good Impression?"	31 May 2009	-
Hobbo turns up at the river wall with Randolph, who he hopes will bring romance into Stella's life. Randolph seems to lack any of the requirements of a potential suitor, and is limp and unattractive, especially after Hobbo drops him in the river. After a little rehearsal and some invaluable tips on how to give Stella 'the look', Randolph demonstrates that he has no chance whatsoever of impressing her. But there must be some way – for instance, who is Stella's favourite movie character?
287	8	"In Which Romance Springs a Leak"	7 June 2009	-
Toby is beginning to realise that the benefits of going back to his ex-wife far outweigh the advantages of living alone in a sparsely furnished house with no-one to cook or clean for him. Fortunately, Hobbo is on hand to skilfully guide him on the route back to marital bliss. But, for some reason, his wife doesn't want him back, and flowers don't work. Undaunted, Hobbo reminds Toby that, in films, romance equals music.
288	9	"Variations on a Theme of Father's Day"	14 June 2009	-
In order that Hobbo can find out more about Nelly, his supposed mother, he has Howard eavesdrop on her when she is visiting Pearl. Soon realising what Howard is up to, the women plant a completely false story about Hobbo's father being a hippie. Hobbo loses no time in making himself look exactly like the description of his father, complete with earrings and beads. Unfortunately, by the time the women see the fruits of their imagination, Hobbo is being arrested.
289	10	"Goodnight, Sweet Ferret"	21 June 2009	Guest appearance of Peter Baldwin.
When word goes around town that Old Heptonstall is looking for volunteers, Hobbo and his army of volunteers, namely Alvin and Entwistle, go and visit him without a second thought. They find that he has a bad leg and is confined to the shed, where at least he doesn't have to listen to his wife's snoring. Tearfully, Heptonstall tells them he wants to go to the churchyard and bury a very dear friend. They are scuppered, however, by a wedding in progress, and by PCs Cooper and Walsh.

== Reception ==
=== Viewers ===
- This series started on 19 April 2009.

=== Critics ===
At the time of series 30's airing, the main points of contention were the programme's speculated loss of quality, as well the generally aimed-for audience of an older generation. Despite this, the show still gained respectable viewing figures.

== DVD release ==
The box set for series thirty was released by Universal Playback in August 2016, mislabelled as a box set for series 31 & 32.

The Complete Series 31 & 32
Set Details
- 18 episodes
- 4-disc set
- Language: English
Release Date
Region 2
15 August 2016
