= Last of the Summer Wine series 27 =

Last of the Summer Wine
- Series 27
- No. of episodes: 10

Release
- Original network: BBC One
- Original release: 18 December 2005 – 28 December 2006

Additional information
- Filming dates: Christmas special: 2005; Series 27: 2005

Season chronology
- ← Previous; 26 Next → 28

The twenty-seventh series of Last of the Summer Wine aired on BBC One. All of the episodes were written by Roy Clarke, and produced and directed by Alan J. W. Bell.

== Characters ==
The quartet in this series consisted of Clegg (Peter Sallis), Truly (Frank Thornton), Billy (Keith Clifford) and Alvin (Brian Murphy). Nelly (2005–2010) makes her first appearance, while Billy Hardcastle (1999–2006) makes his last.

== Episodes ==
| No. overall | No. in series | Title | Original release date | Notes |
|---|---|---|---|---|
| 247 | Christmas–Special | "Merry Entwistle and Jackson Day" | 18 December 2005 | First appearance of Nelly (June Whitfield).; This is the last episode to be made in PAL (576i) format. From the next series, the series is made in high definition. |
| 248 | 1 | "Follow That Bottle" | 5 March 2006 | This is the first episode to be made in high definition.; Audience of 4.43m – 59th most watched programme of the week. |
Intrigued by a note in a bottle floating down the river, Clegg, Truly, Billy and Alvin recruit Entwistle to help them intercept it.
| 249 | 2 | "How to Remove a Cousin" | 12 March 2006 | Guest appearance of Trevor Bannister.; Audience of 4.26m – 57th most watched programme of the week. |
Truly, Billy and Alvin join forces to help Clegg encourage his overbearing cousin to go home.
| 250 | 3 | "Has Anyone Seen Barry's Midlife Crisis?" | 19 March 2006 | Unusually, this episode does not feature the theme tune played on harmonica. |
As Barry frets to Glenda about wanting a mid-life crisis, the foursome attempts to break Howard out of his 24-hour house arrest.
| 251 | 4 | "The Genuine Outdoors Robin Hood Barbi" | 26 March 2006 | Guest appearance of Trevor Bannister. |
Billy's expertise in all things outdoors is called into question, and Barry acquires the services of Tom and Smiler in an attempt to impress the Captain.
| 252 | 5 | "Barry in Danger from Reading & Aunt Jessie" | 2 April 2006 | Audience of 4.23m – 54th most watched programme of the week. |
When Ivy and Nora see Alvin strolling with a strange woman, Alvin devises a scheme to spark Nora's jealousy; meanwhile, Barry's trip to the library might end up put him off reading entirely.
| 253 | 6 | "Who's That Merry Man with Billy, Then?" | 9 April 2006 | Valerie Leon guests as Billy's new recruit. |
Billy is excited after learning he has recruited a new member for his Merry Men; unfortunately, the individual in question is not quite what he expected, forcing him to seek assistance from Clegg, Truly and Alvin.
| 254 | 7 | "Who's That Talking to Lenny?" | 16 April 2006 | Guest appearances (for the second time) of Tommy Cannon and Bobby Ball.; Audience of 3.98m – 54th most watched programme of the week. |
Lenny hears a voice from above and decides he must wait patiently for more information. The gang makes sure he is well equipped to receive messages.
| 255 | 8 | "Oh, Look! Mitzi's Found Her Mummy" | 23 April 2006 | Audience of 4.30m – 48th most watched programme of the week. |
Howard agrees to look after a friend's dog but soon passes the job on to Clegg, in whose hands the dog inexplicably becomes ferocious.
| 256 | 9 | "Plenty of Room in the Back" | 30 April 2006 | Final appearance of Billy Hardcastle. As a result, the quartet reverts to being a trio.; Eli Woods and James Casey guest again as drunks. |
When Smiler and Tom go to collect Auntie Wainright's new company vehicle, they find it certainly has "plenty of room in the back". But is it really up to the job?
| 257 | Christmas–Special | "A Tale of Two Sweaters" | 28 December 2006 | This was the last Christmas-themed special.; Music composed by Nigel Hess.; Audience of 4.88m – 49th most watched programme of the week. |
When Howard is given sweaters by both Pearl and Marina he is forced to master the art of quick changing in order to stay out of trouble.

== DVD release ==
The box set for series twenty-seven was released by Universal Playback in October 2015, mislabelled as a box set for series 27 & 28.

The Complete Series 27 & 28
Set Details
- 21 episodes
- 4-disc set
- Language: English
Release Date
Region 2
5 October 2015
