= Last of the Summer Wine series 4 =

Last of the Summer Wine
- Series 4
- Last of the Summer Wine Series 3 & 4 DVD
- No. of episodes: 9

Release
- Original network: BBC1
- Original release: 9 November 1977 – 26 December 1978

Additional information
- Filming dates: Series 4: 1977; Christmas special: 1978

Season chronology
- ← Previous; 3 Next → 5

The fourth series of Last of the Summer Wine originally aired on BBC1 between 9 November 1977 and 4 January 1978. All episodes were written by Roy Clarke, and produced and directed by Sydney Lotterby.

The fourth series was released on DVD in region 2 as a combined box set with series 3 on 26 July 2004. A box set featuring just series 4 was released for region 1 on 9 September 2008.

== Characters ==
The trio in this series consisted of Compo (Bill Owen), Clegg (Peter Sallis) and Foggy (Brian Wilde).

== Episodes ==
| No. overall | No. in series | Title | Original release date |
|---|---|---|---|
| 22 | 1 | "Ferret Come Home" | 9 November 1977 |
One of Compo's ferrets escapes into Nora's house. Can Wally retrieve it?
| 23 | 2 | "Getting on Sidney's Wire" | 16 November 1977 |
Sid is installing a doorbell in the cafe, and the trio decide to help him.
| 24 | 3 | "Jubilee" | 23 November 1977 |
It is the Queen's Silver Jubilee, and Foggy decides that the trio should help the vicar's parade.: Guest appearance of John Horsley
| 25 | 4 | "Flower Power Cut" | 30 November 1977 |
Clegg tries to persuades the others that flowers have feelings and will respond to music.: Guest appearance of Frances Cox
| 26 | 5 | "Who Made a Bit of a Splash in Wales Then?"" | 7 December 1977 |
Foggy is visiting a lady friend in Wales, but what will happen when Compo, Clegg and Sid intrude?: Guest appearances of Jean Boht and Margaret John
| 27 | 6 | "Greenfingers" | 21 December 1977 |
Foggy is disappointed in the size of the vegetables being sold in the market, so searches out some bigger examples.
| 28 | 7 | "A Merry Heatwave" | 1 January 1978 |
Nora's brother, who lives in Australia, is very ill and unlikely to see another British Christmas. Foggy decides to film an old fashioned Christmas to send to him, unfortunately where do you find holly in the middle of a summer heatwave?: Guest appearances of Pete Postlethwaite and Teddy Turner; First Christmas themed episode, although actually set in the middle of summer; The runtime of this episode is just short of 36 minutes.; There is some confusion as to whether this episode was originally intended to be a Christmas special or not, as it was broadcast in the usual place within a series, but it also happened to be within the Christmas and New Year holidays.
| 29 | 8 | "The Bandit From Stoke-on-Trent" | 4 January 1978 |
Why has "Laugh a Minute" Amos Hames returned to town? Foggy is suspicious.: Guest appearance of Timothy Bateson
| 30 | Christmas–Special | "Small Tune on a Penny Wassail" | 26 December 1978 |
Christmas arrives and the trio visit a friend in hospital, before opening their presents.: Guest appearance of Teddy Turner; Included on Series 5 & 6 Boxset

== DVD release ==
The box set for series 3 and 4 was released by Universal Playback in July 2004.

The Complete Series 3 & 4
Set Details
- 15 episodes
- 3-disc set
- Language: English
Release Date
Region 2
26 July 2004

In addition, Last of the Summer Wine: Vintage 1977 has been released on 9 September 2008 in Region 1 and included all episodes from the fourth series including a rare 1977 interview with Roy Clarke.
