= Last of the Summer Wine series 19 =

Last of the Summer Wine
- Series 19
- No. of episodes: 11

Release
- Original network: BBC One
- Original release: 28 December 1997 – 8 March 1998

Additional information
- Filming dates: Christmas special: 1997; Series 19: 1997

Season chronology
- ← Previous; 18 Next → 20

The nineteenth series of Last of the Summer Wine aired on BBC One. All of the episodes were written by Roy Clarke, and produced and directed by Alan J. W. Bell.

== Characters ==
The trio in this series consisted of Compo (Bill Owen), Clegg (Peter Sallis) and Truly (Frank Thornton).

== Episodes ==
No. overall	No. in series	Title	Original release date	Notes
161	Christmas–Special	"There Goes the Groom"	28 December 1997	This is a 1-hour special.; This episode marks the first appearance of Truly and the last appearance of Foggy.; This was the second episode to feature two of the 'three men'; however, they never converse (albeit Foggy being played by a body double as Brian Wilde was unable to take part owing to ill health).; Guest appearances of Lloyd Peters, Michele Whitehead, Brenda Kempner and Kriss Akabusi (as a milkman).
Barry is best man at a friend's wedding, but when the groom doesn't want to get married, Truly, Compo & Clegg try to convince him of the advantages of a good married life.
162	1	"Beware of the Oglethorpe"	4 January 1998	Guest appearance of Norman Mitchell.; This is the first regular episode to have a cold open, although past episodes used them occasionally.
Compo, Clegg and Truly run into a tired, gloomy old school chum, Coggy Duckworth (whose mother was an Oglethorpe). Seeing him strengthens their resolve to stay active and adventurous.
163	2	"Tarzan of the Towpath"	11 January 1998	Filming took place along the adjacent towpath of the River Calder (near Mirfield).
The trio ends up rolling down a hill, instead of walking down it, as they did when they were children, but their age proves to speak louder than their will for adventure.
164	3	"Truly and the Hole Truth"	18 January 1998	-
Truly becomes jealous of people who get their picture in the paper for performing selfless acts of bravery. He sets out to prove he's up to the task of rescuing others, even if he has to orchestrate a disaster himself.
165	4	"Oh Howard, We Should Get One of Those"	25 January 1998	-
Wesley's new creation meets with great success – particularly with Compo – who wants to be the first one to try it. Has he finally found the perfect way to get close to Nora?
166	5	"The Suit That Attracts Blondes"	1 February 1998	-
Glenda gives one of Barry's old suits to the jumble sale, because she thinks it attracts blondes. Compo ends up buying the suit, with money from Truly and Clegg.
167	6	"The Only Diesel Saxophone in Captivity"	8 February 1998	-
Barry buys a new saxophone from Auntie Wainwright. Glenda doesn't let him play indoors, so he has to find a spot outside to practise. The problems start when Barry discovers in what type of case the saxophone comes in.
168	7	"Perfection – Thy Name Is Ridley"	15 February 1998	Guest appearance of Vincent Worth as Walter Ridley
When the local ladies start to gain some interest for a man named Walter Ridley, it's up for the trio to try to find out why he's so highly regarded by all the local women.
169	8	"Nowhere Particular"	22 February 1998	Peter Sallis and Frank Thornton feature in only two scenes during the episode, once near the beginning and another near the end, marking this episode as one of the first not to feature a trio of men at the centre of the plot.
Howard buys a new van, as part of his new scheme to be left in peace with Marina. He even buys some furniture to put on the back of the van, to make it "a little more comfortable".
170	9	"From Audrey Nash to the Widow Dilhooley"	1 March 1998	Huddersfield train station appears in this episode.; The show's closing theme is played in the style of a tango.
Truly hears one of his old girlfriends is coming back to town, and he tries to meet her dressed as he was the last time they saw each other.
171	10	"Support your Local Skydiver"	8 March 1998	This is the last episode to be made in 4:3 format, which has been used since the first episode 25 years before.; The postcards are from someone called Gladwin. Nora's late husband Wally was played by Joe Gladwin.
Compo finds out that Nora Batty is getting post cards sent from the Canary Islands. This makes him jealous, so he seeks help from Clegg and Truly to try to impress her – but he's not very pleased with the plan.

== DVD release ==
The box set for series nineteen was released by Universal Playback in February 2011, mislabelled as a box set for series 19 & 20.

The Complete Series 19 & 20
Set Details
- 22 episodes
- 4-disc set
- Language: English
Release Date
Region 2
7 February 2011
