= Last of the Summer Wine series 28 =

Last of the Summer Wine
- Series 28
- No. of episodes: 10

Release
- Original network: BBC One
- Original release: 15 July – 23 September 2007

Additional information
- Filming dates: Series 28: 2006

Season chronology
- ← Previous; 27 Next → 29

The twenty-eighth series of Last of the Summer Wine aired on BBC One. All of the episodes were written by Roy Clarke, and produced and directed by Alan J. W. Bell.

== Characters ==
The trio in this series consisted of Clegg (Peter Sallis), Truly (Frank Thornton) and Alvin (Brian Murphy). This series saw Smiler Hemingway's (1988, 1990–2007) final appearance.

== Episodes ==
No. overall	No. in series	Title	Original release date	Notes
258	1	"The Second Stag Night of Doggy Wilkinson"	15 July 2007	Guest appearance of Eric Sykes.; Audience of 3.28m – 68th most watched programme of the week.; It's unknown whether Doggy was related to Barry and Glenda Wilkinson.
An old friend – Doggy – is getting remarried and invites Clegg, Truly, Alvin, Entwistle and Howard to his stag night at a local inn. At nearly 80, for Doggy it's more a 'stag afternoon' to celebrate his last day of freedom. Doggy is disappointed that this stag night is less fun than his last, and to make matters worse, he just can't remember the name of his bride to be. When he gets into a singing mode, he falls from a table and has to be wheeled home in a handcart – but manages to kiss a policeman on the way. Pearl is suspicious of Howard's whereabouts, and goes to the Inn where, unfortunately, Truly has arranged for Marina to be a "kiss-o-gram girl" for Doggy's stag night.
259	2	"What Happened to the Horse?"	29 July 2007	-
Clegg, Truly and Alvin never miss an opportunity to mislead Howard, so when Alvin observes that a particular strip of woodland looks as if it could be haunted, they soon convince him of its authenticity. Howard accepts the story that nobody goes to the wood at a certain time because of weird sightings of a ghostly tinker, and immediately sees the opportunity to go there for an innocent nature walk with Marina. To scare Howard, Alvin dresses-up to look like the ghostly tinker; however, into the wood comes Barry who is dressed in a costume for a part he has in an amateur dramatic production. When Alvin and Barry see each other, they both think they have seen the real ghostly tinker and flee. The local police see the frenzied escape of the men in Entwistle's truck and give pursuit. When Alvin – wide eyed and ghostly looks out from the truck, the police car skids off the road into a roadside sign.
260	3	"Variations on a Theme of Road Rage"	5 August 2007	Audience of 3.2m – 64th most watched programme of the week.
Howard purchases a used car, not knowing that the previous owner still has a claim to it.
261	4	"In Which Howard Gets Double Booked"	12 August 2007	Audience of 3.96m – 37th most watched programme of the week.
Howard agrees to take Pearl out on the same night that Truly and Alvin promised he would take Marina out as well.
262	5	"Will the Nearest Alien Please Come In"	19 August 2007	Guest appearance of Mark Curry.; Audience of 4.02m – 43rd most watched programme of the week.
Truly and Alvin look for alien life.
263	6	"Elegy for Small Creature and Clandestine Trackbike"	26 August 2007	From this episode until "Sinclair and the Wormley Witches", Nigel Hess temporarily takes over as composer.
Clegg reluctantly agrees to let Howard bring his new bicycle in to his house out of sight from Pearl, but is dismayed when he finds that it is a track bike. When Truly, Alvin and Entwistle are assisting Clegg to get the bike out of his house, Pearl appears and wants to know to whom it belongs. Howard tells her that it belongs to Clegg. Later the men happen upon Tom who is grieving over the death of a dear friend. After getting him drunk, they wheel him back on an abandoned supermarket trolley. Howard implores Clegg to dress-up as a motor cyclist and just be seen by Pearl with the bike. The ladies hear the noise of the bike and are just in time to see Clegg roar-off in pursuit of Tom in the supermarket trolley, which has silently rolled away. Pearl is convinced that Clegg is really a biker and, for a short while, Howard is in the clear.
264	7	"The Crowcroft Challenge"	2 September 2007	Audience of 4.1m – 37th most watched programme of the week.
Alvin and Howard agree to take up the Crowcroft Challenge, not realizing what it entails.
265	8	"Must Be Good Dancer"	9 September 2007	Audience of 4.08m – 41st most watched programme of the week.
Alvin, Tom and Truly try to persuade Smiler to dance.
266	9	"In Which Howard Remembers Where He Left His Bicycle Pump"	16 September 2007	Audience of 3.95m – 43rd most watched programme of the week.
Howard bumps into an old flame.
267	10	"Sinclair and the Wormley Witches"	23 September 2007	Final appearance of Smiler. His absence is explained by Tom in the next series.; Audience of 4.6m – 39th most watched programme of the week.
Sinclair wants to be exorcised but doesn't bargain for Smiler doing the exorcising.

== DVD release ==
The box set for series twenty-eight was released by Universal Playback in May 2016, mislabelled as a box set for series 29 & 30.

The Complete Series 29 & 30
Set Details
- 21 episodes
- 4-disc set
- Language: English
Release Date
Region 2
16 May 2016
