= Last of the Summer Wine series 22 =

Last of the Summer Wine
- Series 22
- No. of episodes: 10

Release
- Original network: BBC One
- Original release: 1 April – 3 June 2001

Additional information
- Filming dates: Series 22: 2000

Season chronology
- ← Previous; 21 Next → 23

The twenty-second series of Last of the Summer Wine aired on BBC One. All of the episodes were written by Roy Clarke, and produced and directed by Alan J. W. Bell.

== Characters ==
The trio in this series consisted of Clegg (Peter Sallis), Truly (Frank Thornton) and Billy (Keith Clifford). Herman Teesdale (The Repo Man) (2001–2005, 2007–2010) and Toby Mulberry Smith (The Captain) (2001–2006, 2008–2010) make their first appearances, while Mrs Avery (2000–2001) and Nora Batty (1973–2001, 2003–2008) appear for the final time.

== Episodes ==
No. overall	No. in series	Title	Original release date	Notes
193	1	"Getting Barry's Goat"	1 April 2001	Billy becomes a regular character.; First appearance of Herman Teesdale (Christopher Beeny).; Audience figure 8.51 million.
Barry tries to return Tom's goat after it has been left in his garage. Tom and Mrs. Avery move into Compo's House.
194	2	"The Art of the Shorts Story"	8 April 2001	-
Howard gets into a panic when he cannot find his shorts and is questioned about them by Pearl. Howard enlists Billy's help to provide him with some spare shorts, though perhaps he has failed to appreciate the height difference between them.
195	3	"The Missing Bus of Mrs. Avery"	15 April 2001	First appearance of Toby Mulberry Smith (then known as "The Captain") (Trevor Bannister).
Howard is cheerful and Pearl is suspicious. Mrs. Avery is flustered to drive the ladies on their outing.
196	4	"Hey, Big Vendor"	22 April 2001	-
Wesley's latest invention should prove a big hit at the jumble sale, if only the rude noises it makes could be quietened down! Meanwhile, Clegg, Truly and Billy seek to help Barry improve his standing at the local golf club.
197	5	"Enter the Hawk"	29 April 2001	Audience figure 5.38 million.
Barry is interested in a pinstripe suit that he feels will help him look like managerial material. Pearl makes Howard his favourite meal, and Howard becomes suspicious.
198	6	"Gnome and Away"	6 May 2001	Norman Wisdom makes his third guest appearance (though uncredited).
Howard recruits Truly and Clegg to hide his latest gift for Marina until he can give it to her. The coffee circle becomes suspicious and attempts to uncover the truth behind the mysteriously shrouded object.
199	7	"A Hair of the Blonde That Bit You"	13 May 2001	-
When Pearl finds a single blonde hair on one of Howard's shirts he need some assistance to get himself out of trouble enlisting Clegg, Truly and Billy to try to find him a plausible excuse.
200	8	"A White Sweater and A Solicitor's Letter"	20 May 2001	Audience figure 5.99 million.
As Barry and Howard indulge their latest respective passions, a solicitor's letter arrives, addressed to Compo. Truly, Clegg and a nervous Tom venture out to determine whether it's good Yorkshire fortune or a bad bookie debt.
201	9	"Why Is Barry at an Angle?"	27 May 2001	Audience figure 4.86 million.
Barry has the undesirable task of collecting on a customer's late payment, and the quartet have a little fun at his expense; meanwhile, Howard and Marina find themselves in a stickier-than-normal situation.
202	10	"The Coming of the Beast"	3 June 2001	Audience figure 5.40 million.; Last appearance of Nora Batty until the 2002 Christmas special.; Final appearance of Mrs. Avery.; Norman Wisdom makes his fourth guest appearance.
While a rumour of a roaming tiger worries the townsfolk, Wesley's new toy gives Barry a chance to prove his usefulness in overalls.

== DVD release ==
The box set for series twenty-two was released by Universal Playback in April 2012, mislabelled as a box set for series 23 & 24.

The Complete Series 23 & 24
Set Details
- 22 episodes
- 4-disc set
- Language: English
Release Date
Region 2
23 April 2012
