= Last of the Summer Wine series 15 =

Last of the Summer Wine
- Series 15
- No. of episodes: 10

Release
- Original network: BBC1
- Original release: 24 October – 27 December 1993

Additional information
- Filming dates: Series 15: 1993; Christmas special: 1993

Season chronology
- ← Previous; 14 Next → 16

The fifteenth series of Last of the Summer Wine aired on BBC1 in 1993. All of the episodes were written by Roy Clarke, and produced and directed by Alan J. W. Bell.

== Characters ==
The trio in this series consisted of Compo (Bill Owen), Clegg (Peter Sallis) and Foggy (Brian Wilde).

== Episodes ==
No. overall	No. in series	Title	Original release date	Notes
120	1	"How to Clear Your Pipes"	24 October 1993	-
Now Foggy's on about Compo and Clegg being out of shape again, and he ends up putting them through an exhaustive training course that leaves them trapped inside sewer pipes. Howard's latest subterfuge has him publicizing the bicycle race he and Marina are "participating" in, but he does it a little too well this time.
121	2	"Where There's Smoke, There's Barbecue"	31 October 1993	-
The trio gets a gas grill from Auntie Wainwright, but its alarming potency brings an explosive touch to their barbecue. Howard is busy making improvements on his love-nest. Will it inflame Marina's passions, or just inflame Marina? And how did Howard end up with a wooden leg?
122	3	"The Black Widow"	7 November 1993	The concluding theme tune is played in the style of a two-step, consistent with Foggy's predicament in the dance hall at the end of this episode.; Guest appearance of Zara Nutley as Mrs Jack Attercliffe.
Too much home brew at a funeral tea leaves Compo and Foggy having to rescue Clegg from the arms of an amorous widow.
123	4	"Have You Got a Light, Mate?"	14 November 1993	-
Smiler is selling security lights. Howard is determined to buy Marina a china shepherdess-if he can persuade Clegg to visit Auntie Wainwright's.
124	5	"Stop That Bath"	21 November 1993	Filming took place, again, close to the nearby Standedge Tunnels.; During the closing credits, the Huddersfield Line, Aqueduct and Canal make a combined appearance.; It was this episode that inadvertently caused the phrase "Three old men in a bathtub", an unflattering shorthand for a series that had passed its prime.
The trio finds they are involved in yet another of Howard's schemes to get a present to Marina-this time a cast iron bath!
125	6	"Springing Smiler"	28 November 1993	This episode marks the end of Smiler's tenure as Nora Batty's lodger, having moved in during the episode "A Landlady for Smiler".
Smiler is sick of living in misery with Nora Batty and will hand over 50 quid to anyone who will help him move out and live in misery someplace else. Foggy has a plan to get Smiler thrown out, but will Compo murder Smiler before they can put it into action?
126	7	"Concerto for Solo Bicycle"	5 December 1993	-
Foggy comes up with the crazy idea of bicycle safety underwear after he collides with Compo riding his old bike.
127	8	"There Are Gypsies at the Bottom of Our Garden"	12 December 1993	Guest appearances of Kate Robbins and Bernard Wrigley as gypsies.
Dewhirst's "Nature Tours" are launched by Foggy after he believes he's discovered the nesting place of a giant woodpecker.
128	9	"Aladdin Gets on Your Wick"	19 December 1993	This is the last episode to feature the long concluding theme tune, various versions of which have been used since early episodes.; From the next series, the shorter end theme and credits are used. It would remain that way for the rest of the series.
After seeing a man on a sailboard, Foggy has the idea of inventing a three-man version.
129	Christmas–Special	"Welcome to Earth"	27 December 1993	The show's theme is adapted to the style of E.T. for the closing credits.; Guest appearance of Paul Bown (of Watching fame); Cameo appearance of John Cleese (of Monty Python fame)

== DVD release ==
The box set for series fifteen was released by Universal Playback in October 2009, mislabelled as a box set for series 15 & 16.

The Complete Series 15 & 16
Set Details
- 20 episodes
- 4-disc set
- Language: English
Release Date
Region 2
26 October 2009
