= Last of the Summer Wine series 11 =

Last of the Summer Wine
- Series 11
- No. of episodes: 8

Release
- Original network: BBC1
- Original release: 15 October – 23 December 1989

Additional information
- Filming dates: Series 11: 1989; Christmas special: 1989

Season chronology
- ← Previous; 10 Next → 12

The eleventh series of Last of the Summer Wine aired on BBC1 in 1989. All of the episodes were written by Roy Clarke, and produced and directed by Alan J. W. Bell.

== Characters ==
The trio in this series consisted of Compo (Bill Owen), Clegg (Peter Sallis) and Seymour (Michael Aldridge).

== Episodes ==
No. overall	No. in series	Title	Original release date	Notes
84	1	"Come Back, Jack Harry Teesdale"	15 October 1989	Jack Harry Teesdale (played by Bert Parnaby) would later reappear in the next series episode "The Charity Balls".; Small audio edit made to Jack Harry's whistle around 7 minutes into the episode.
After getting a lift from Jack Harry Teesdale and his wife, the trio offer to help solve a marriage problem – getting their caravan into the drive.
85	2	"The Kiss and Mavis Poskit"	22 October 1989	-
Clegg is in hiding, after Nora, Ivy and the rest of the ladies want to fix him up with a timid woman whom he knew at school.
86	3	"Oh, Shut Up and Eat Your Choc Ice"	29 October 1989	-
After accidentally knocking a bale of hay down a hill, Seymour is determined the trio should get it back where it started. When they are unable to push it, Seymour enlists Compo to tow back with a Reliant Robin, but Compo is more interested in giving Nora, Ivy and Pearl a lift back home.
87	4	"Who's That Bloke with Nora Batty, Then?"	5 November 1989	-
Compo is filled with jealousy when he spots Nora with a man. The trio later discover it was Barry's Uncle Eric getting people to help sell Christmas hampers.
88	5	"Happy Anniversary, Gough and Jessie"	12 November 1989	Guest appearances of Cardew Robinson and Frances Cox as Gough and Jessie
The lads are at the golden wedding anniversary of an old friend, and decide that it's time for him to sample some of the other pleasures of life, away from his wife.
89	6	"Getting Barry Higher in the World"	19 November 1989	-
Seymour designs a kite for Compo, but doesn't count on Wesley mixing the measurements up.
90	7	"Three Men and a Mangle"	26 November 1989	Filming took place at the disused Thornton railway viaduct (near Queensbury).; Second appearance of PC Walsh, and last until series 26 (2004).
Nora asks Compo to deliver her mangle to a friend. What can possibly go wrong?
91	Christmas–Special	"What's Santa Brought for Nora, Then?"	23 December 1989	50-minute special; This was the last full episode to feature Seymour Utterthwaite. In the first episode of the following series, he would appear for only the first five minutes before leaving the town on a bus to take up a new teaching post.; This episode features the second guest appearance of Auntie Wainwright. She would become a regular from series 14.; At the end of the episode, the final present, which Ivy opens, is a painted egg, presumably a teaser for Foggy's return the following series. A further indication of this is that part of Foggy's theme plays as Ivy and Nora read the card the egg came with, where they appear to mouth Foggy's name.; Included on the series 11 & 12 boxset.
It's Christmas 1989, and Compo is trying to earn some money to buy Nora a Christmas present. Surely Auntie Wainwright will have something suitable.

== DVD release ==
The box set for series ten was released by Universal Playback in September 2008, mislabelled as a box set for series 11 & 12.

The Complete Series 11 & 12
Set Details
- 15 episodes
- 3-disc set
- Language: English
Release Date
Region 2
22 September 2008
