= Last of the Summer Wine series 14 =

Last of the Summer Wine
- Series 14
- No. of episodes: 10

Release
- Original network: BBC1
- Original release: 25 October – 26 December 1992

Additional information
- Filming dates: Series 14: 1992; Christmas special: 1992

Series chronology
- ← Previous; 13 Next → 15

The fourteenth series of Last of the Summer Wine aired on BBC1 in 1992. All of the episodes were written by Roy Clarke, and produced and directed by Alan J. W. Bell.

This was the first series to be shot entirely on film, although the complete episode was still assembled on videotape.

== Characters ==
The trio in this series consisted of Compo (Bill Owen), Clegg (Peter Sallis) and Foggy (Brian Wilde).

== Episodes ==
No. overall	No. in series	Title	Original release date	Notes
110	1	"By the Magnificent Thighs of Ernie Burniston"	25 October 1992	Auntie Wainwright became a regular character from this episode until the show ended.
Howard asks Clegg to deliver a birthday card to Marina, and Foggy decides that it's time Compo got fit.
111	2	"Errol Flynn Used to Have a Pair Like That"	1 November 1992	-
Compo finds out that Nora likes a man in horse-riding gear.
112	3	"The Phantom of the Graveyard"	8 November 1992	The second and final instance of the exterior of Foggy Dewhurst's house appearing in the series.; A rare instance of timeline appearing in the series, when the coffin shows a 1992 date on its plaque.
An old school teacher of the trio has died, so the lads are off to his funeral.
113	4	"The Self-Propelled Salad Strainer"	15 November 1992	-
Wesley has plans for a ride-on lawnmower. He's going to adapt it for the purpose of cleaning windows.
114	5	"Ordeal by Trousers"	22 November 1992	Jim Bowen guest stars for the second time.
Ivy and Nora are looking for volunteers for the church concert, and, suspicious about the truthfulness of Foggy's war stories, Compo and Clegg use an old school challenge to root out liars on him.
115	6	"Happy Birthday, Howard"	29 November 1992	Jim Bowen guest stars for the third and final time as the library security guard.
Marina asks Clegg to deliver a birthday present to Howard. It'd be an easier job, if the present weren't a giant cuddly panda.
116	7	"Who's Got Rhythm?"	6 December 1992	Trevor Bannister guest stars (as a different character). He would return to the series, as the Golf Captain, a couple of years later.
Compo is short of money, but after a flash of inspiration (and a visit to Auntie Wainwright's), he becomes a one-man band.
117	8	"Camera Shy"	13 December 1992	-
Foggy buys a camcorder from Auntie Wainwright, and practices filming in the hills. He wants to watch it back, but doesn't have a video player. Luckily Pearl steps in and offers the use of her TV and video, but will it be lucky for Howard? Has Foggy captured more than just the countryside on tape?
118	9	"Wheelies"	20 December 1992	-
Foggy invents a new form of transport...a giant wheel. Compo finds himself volunteered to test drive it.
119	Christmas–Special	"Stop That Castle"	26 December 1992	The closing theme is in the style of a march.
The trio visit Auntie Wainwright, to rent a bouncy castle for the Christmas parade.

== DVD release ==
The box set for series fourteen was released by Universal Playback in October 2009, mislabelled as a box set for series 15 & 16.

The Complete Series 15 & 16
Set Details
- 20 episodes
- 4-disc set
- Language: English
Release Date
Region 2
26 October 2009
