= Last of the Summer Wine series 3 =

Last of the Summer Wine
- Series 3
- Last of the Summer Wine Series 3 & 4 DVD
- No. of episodes: 7

Release
- Original network: BBC1
- Original release: 27 October – 24 December 1976

Additional information
- Filming dates: 1976

Season chronology
- ← Previous; 2 Next → 4

The third series of Last of the Summer Wine originally aired on BBC1 between 27 October 1976 and 24 December 1976. All episodes from this series were written by Roy Clarke and produced by Sydney Lotterby Five episodes were directed by Sydney Lotterby, but two, "The Great Boarding House Bathroom Caper" and "Cheering Up Gordon", were directed by Ray Butt.

Although none of the episodes from series 3 made it into the top ten programmes of the week on their initial screening, a repeat showing of the final episode, "Isometrics and After," attracted 15 million viewers during a repeat screening in spring 1977. Also notable was the inclusion for the first time of a two-part episode consisting of "The Great Boarding House Bathroom Caper" and "Cheering Up Gordon," both featuring guest appearances by Philip Jackson as Compo's nephew, Gordon.

The third series was released on DVD in region 2 as a combined box set with series 4 on 26 July 2004. A box set featuring just series 3 was released for region 1 on 11 March 2008.

== Characters ==
The trio in this series consisted of Compo (Bill Owen), Clegg (Peter Sallis) and Foggy (Brian Wilde). Blake Butler reprised his role from the first series as the librarian, Mr. Wainwright, before departing the show again at the end of the year. The most notable change this season, however, was the addition of Brian Wilde as the new third-man of the trio, Foggy Dewhurst, an ex-military sign painter. Wilde would play this role twice: between 1976 and 1985 and then again from 1990 until 1997, when he was forced to leave owing to health problems.

== Episodes ==
No. overall	No. in series	Title	Directed by	Original release date	Prod. code	Disc
15	1	"The Man from Oswestry"	Sydney Lotterby	27 October 1976	LLCG491B	1
Compo is depressed following Blamire's departure. He and Clegg soon receive a letter from Blamire, however, asking them to help one of their old classmates he ran into, Foggy Dewhurst. Compo and Clegg meet Foggy at the bus station and help him with his luggage. Afterwards, they go to the pub and Foggy ends up in a fight with Big Malcolm (Paul Luty) while defending his regimental scarf.: This episode marks the first appearance of Foggy Dewhurst.
16	2	"Mending Stuart's Leg"	Sydney Lotterby	3 November 1976	LLCG492W	1
After being thrown out of the library by Mr. Wainwright, the trio go to the café to find Sid is in trouble with Ivy for not fixing the slates on the roof. Foggy takes charge, attaching a rope to Compo and the other end to Sid's van to pull Compo up. Sid, however, loses control of the van, leaving Compo hanging from the roof.
17	3	"The Great Boarding House Bathroom Caper"	Ray Butt	10 November 1976	LLCG493P	1
In the first part of a two-part episode, the trio, along with Sid and Ivy, crowd in Compo's nephew, Gordon's, (Philip Jackson) van for a trip to Scarborough for the weekend. At their boarding house, Compo seems to be obsessively washing his feet. However, he has discovered Nora is staying in the same house and Compo is attempting to catch sight of her undressed. At bedtime, Foggy investigates a strange noise to discover Compo has brought his ferrets with him.
18	4	"Cheering Up Gordon"	Ray Butt	17 November 1976	LLCG494J	1
In the conclusion to the two-parter, the trio get kicked out of a church after Compo's ferrets get loose. On the beach, Foggy decides Gordon needs to be cheered up. After a ride on a donkey doesn't work, Compo agrees to teach Gordon how to pick up women if Gordon teaches him how to fish. Disaster ensues when the fishing line wraps around a beach buggy and Compo picks up some women which frighten the trio.
19	5	"The Kink in Foggy's Niblick"	Sydney Lotterby	24 November 1976	LLCG497R	1
After a game of football, Foggy experiences a great pain and says his real forte is playing golf, although he admits he has not played since 1939. Compo and Clegg goad him and he challenges Sid to a game. Foggy's clubs, however, have warped and he cannot actually hit the ball. Foggy's game goes on so long they have to finish by gaslight. Meanwhile, Compo discovers the club pays for found balls and undercuts their prices.: This is the first and only time we see inside Foggy's house (albeit only his attic) during Brian Wilde's first stint as the character.
20	6	"Going to Gordon's Wedding"	Sydney Lotterby	1 December 1976	LLCG495D	2
The trio go to Gordon's wedding and Compo buys him an alarm clock as a wedding present. At the church, Foggy tries to photograph the occasion while Compo has problems with his buttonhole. After throwing his flower on the floor, the best man slips on it, breaking his leg and sending him to hospital. Compo is appointed the new best man but soon discovers the ring has gone to hospital with his predecessor. The trio recover it in time for Compo's alarm clock to go off during the ceremony.: This episode is a sequel to the two-parter ‘The Great Boarding House Bathroom Caper’/‘Cheering Up Gordon’
21	7	"Isometrics and After"	Sydney Lotterby	8 December 1976	LLC1391W	2
Deciding that the three of them are unfit, Foggy instructs Clegg and Compo in a method of exercise called "isometrics." Their first lesson is to lift a table off the floor by one leg. The trio try the exercise on the tables in the library, only to discover the tables are bolted to the floor. After they actually manage to lift one, they are thrown out and jog towards the café, until Foggy decides they should try horseback riding. Once on, however, they discover they are unable to stop the horses.: An error occurs in this episode: a bemused Foggy asks Compo what he’s got in his matchbox, despite having been shown what was in the matchbox earlier in the episode.

== DVD release ==
The box set for series 3 and 4 was released by Universal Playback in July 2004.

The Complete Series 3 & 4
Set Details
- 15 episodes
- 3-disc set
- Language: English
Release Date
Region 2 Region 1 S3 only
26 July 2004 11 March 2008
