= Last of the Summer Wine series 13 =

Last of the Summer Wine
- Series 13
- No. of episodes: 7

Release
- Original network: BBC1
- Original release: 18 October – 22 December 1991

Additional information
- Filming dates: Series 13: 1991; Christmas special: 1991

Season chronology
- ← Previous; 12 Next → 14

The thirteenth series of Last of the Summer Wine aired on BBC1 in 1991. All of the episodes were written by Roy Clarke, and produced and directed by Alan J. W. Bell.

Notably, this series of the show was shot entirely on videotape. Prior to this, the show had used videotape for studio scenes and film for location footage. From the following series until 2004, when it started being shot digitally in High-Definition, the show moved to being shot entirely on film, although the laughter track is still included, respectively. The completed shows were still assembled on videotape (with credit and title captions being added during this stage) until the 1995 series.

== Outline ==
The trio in this series consisted of Compo (Bill Owen), Clegg (Peter Sallis) and Foggy (Brian Wilde).

== Episodes ==
No. overall	No. in series	Title	Original release date	Notes
103	1	"Quick, Quick, Slow"	18 October 1991	Stephen Lewis's appearance is noted as a special guest star
Following on from A Landlady for Smiler, Nora still has Smiler in as her lodger, and Compo is depressed about it, considering her "his bird", Clegg and Foggy try a variety of things to snap him out of the mood.
104	2	"Give Us a Lift"	25 October 1991	Guest appearance of Tony Capstick as 1st PC; Guest appearance of Ken Kitson as 2nd PC
Compo is convinced the hills are getting steeper, so Foggy sets out to invent a chair lift to make their lives easier, enrolling Wesley Pegden to assist with the contraption. Meanwhile, Howard takes Marina birdwatching.
105	3	"Was That Nora Batty Singing?""	1 November 1991	Cameo appearance of Johnny Leeze; The bus seen in this episode, Yorkshire Rider 6299(PUA299W), was a café in Hastings for several years, still in commemorative Huddersfield livery.
Compo believes he can hear Nora singing, and is convinced that she and Smiler are having an affair and does everything in his power to get to the bottom of things and separate the pair.
106	4	"Cashflow Problems"	8 November 1991	Guest appearances of Roger Grainger, Hope Johnstone, Ian Fairbairn and Alan Starkey
Compo is skint and will do anything for some money in his pocket when he remembers that he's owed money from an old schoolfriend, Biff Hemingway, so the trio set off to track him down.
107	5	"Passing the Earring"	15 November 1991	Cameo appearance of Chris Breeze
Howard finds one of Marina's earrings caught in his jumper and is desperate to get it out of the house before Pearl sees it. The trio, with the help of Smiler, try their best to help.
108	6	"Pole Star"	29 November 1991	Cameo appearance of Tony Nelson
Compo is envious of Smiler because Nora Batty has asked him to help around the house. Foggy thinks that he can break Compo out of a pouty mood by teaching him pole-vaulting to impress the ladies.
109	Christmas–Special	"Situations Vacant"	22 December 1991	Tom Owen guest stars in this episode as a different character, before returning as Tom Simmonite nine years later.; Last episode to be entirely shot on videotape. From the next series, the series was shot entirely on film.; This was the last episode to have its interior scenes recorded in front of a studio audience at BBC Television Centre.
Foggy decides to start up a motorbike courier service.

== DVD release ==
The box set for series thirteen was released by Universal Playback in December 2008, mislabelled as a box set for series 13 & 14.

The Complete Series 13 & 14
Set Details
- 15 episodes
- 3-disc set
- Language: English
Release Date
Region 2
26 December 2008
