= Last of the Summer Wine series 8 =

Last of the Summer Wine
- Series 8
- Last of the Summer Wine Series 7 & 8 DVD
- No. of episodes: 7

Release
- Original network: BBC1
- Original release: 30 December 1984 – 17 March 1985

Additional information
- Filming dates: Seasonal special: 1984; Series 8: 1984

Season chronology
- ← Previous; 7 Next → 9

The eighth series of Last of the Summer Wine originally aired on BBC1 between 30 December 1984 and 17 March 1985. All episodes were written by Roy Clarke, and produced and directed by Alan J. W. Bell.

The eighth series was released on DVD in region 2 as a combined box set with series 7 on 3 March 2008.

== Outline ==
The trio in this series consisted of Compo (Bill Owen), Clegg (Peter Sallis) and Foggy (Brian Wilde). This series marked the first appearances of Crusher (1984–1987), Howard Sibshaw (1985–2010), Pearl Sibshaw (1985–2010) and Marina (1985–2010), and the return of Wesley Pegden (1982, 1984–2002). This was the final appearance of Foggy Dewhurst (1976–1985, 1990–1997) until 1990.

== Episodes ==
No. overall	No. in series	Title	Original release date	Notes
55	Seasonal–Special	"The Loxely Lozenge"	30 December 1984	This episode marks the first appearance of Crusher; however, his introduction generally now appears in the 2nd episode of the 8th series. For continuity reasons, in most repeat airings of this episode (as well as the DVD releases), Jonathan Linsley's appearance as Crusher has been edited out. As The Loxley Lozenge was moved to the front of this series to become a seasonal special, it ultimately caused continuity problems with the character of Crusher.; This episode also marked the 2nd (owing to popularity) guest appearance of Wesley Pegden (who became a full regular from the next series until 2002).; Also guest-starring appearance of Ashley Jackson as a painter.; Included on the Series 7 & 8 boxset.; The general consensus is the chassis of an Austin Sheerline was used as a prop for the titular fictional vehicle.; The original scripted ending involved the settee (on which the three men sat) sliding around the chassis, making it difficult for Clegg to steer; the settee tips over backwards, causing the men to fall out. This was altered owing to safety and logistical concerns.; The scene in which the Loxely Lozenge detaches from Wesley's Land Rover and rolls back toward the wall was unplanned. Unlike as depicted in the final scene, the actors were safely stopped before crashing.
Wesley needs some help. He's found an old, but extremely valuable racing car, and wants the lads to help him get it home.
56	1	"The Mysterious Feet of Nora Batty"	10 February 1985	As originally scripted, Compo was to pour liquid onto a piece of hardboard with the idea that Nora Batty would step onto it, leaving an imprint of her feet to be measured. It would result in the board being stuck to Compo's wellies and the scene would have ended with him escaping down her steps, the hardboard still attached to his feet. Safety concerns necessitated alterations.
Foggy and Compo have a disagreement about the size of Nora's feet, so they set out to find out the truth.
57	2	"Keeping Britain Tidy"	17 February 1985	The official introduction of Crusher occurs in this episode as his appearance has been edited out of the previous Christmas special in most repeats and the DVD release. He becomes a regular character from this episode until the 1987 Christmas special; This episode features Brian Glover as a guest star. Ten years earlier Glover and Brian Wilde had appeared together in series one of Porridge.
Foggy decides to embark upon a campaign to clean up the countryside, starting with an old mattress.
58	3	"Enter the Phantom"	24 February 1985	The location of the garage in which Foggy customises The Phantom’s motorbike is actually only two doors along from the location of Lily Bless‘er’s house.
Compo transforms himself into 'The Phantom', a daredevil motorcyclist. Will this impress Nora?
59	4	"Catching Digby's Donkey"	3 March 1985	This episode marks the first appearances of Howard, Pearl and Marina who become full regulars from this episode.; Guest starring John Evitts as Digby/
Foggy offers to help Digby catch his donkey.
60	5	"The Woollenmills of Your Mind"	10 March 1985	The theme from Chariots of Fire can be heard during Compo's training sequence.
Compo comes up with yet another plan to impress Nora – entering a marathon.
61	5	"Who's Looking After the Café, Then?"	17 March 1985	This episode sees the last appearance of Foggy (as Wilde left to star in Wyatt's Watchdogs). He would return in Series 12 five years later.; Third guest appearance of Wesley Pegden before becoming a regular character in the following episode, "Uncle of the Bride".; David Williams makes his second of three appearances as Norris Fairburn.
Foggy volunteers to look after Ivy's Café while she goes out.

== DVD release ==
The box set for series 7 and 8 was released by Universal Playback in March 2008.

The Complete Series 7 & 8
Set Details
- 15 episodes
- 3-disc set
- Language: English
Release Date
Region 2
3 March 2008

The region 2 DVD contains edited episodes for "The Loxley Lozenge" and "Catching Digby's Donkey". Both episodes are unedited on the region 1 DVD release.
