= Last of the Summer Wine series 16 =

Last of the Summer Wine
- Series 16
- No. of episodes: 9

Release
- Original network: BBC1
- Original release: 1 January – 26 February 1995

Additional information
- Filming dates: Series 16: 1994

Season chronology
- ← Previous; 15 Next → 17

The sixteenth series of Last of the Summer Wine aired on BBC1. All of the episodes were written by Roy Clarke, and produced and directed by Alan J. W. Bell.

== Characters ==
The trio in this series consisted of Compo (Bill Owen), Clegg (Peter Sallis) and Foggy (Brian Wilde).

== Episodes ==
No. overall	No. in series	Title	Original release date	Notes
130	NewYear–Special	"The Man Who Nearly Knew Pavarotti"	1 January 1995	60-minute special; This episode marks the first appearance of Norman Wisdom as a recurring guest star playing Billy Ingleton.; First episode to be in broadcast in a widescreen aspect ratio.; Filming took place at one of the locks of the Huddersfield Broad Canal.
After Wesley almost runs over Billy Ingleton. Foggy gets to prove his talents as a concert promoter.
131	1	"The Glory Hole"	8 January 1995	From this point until the end, the concluding theme tune and credits are shorter.
While out in the hills one day, Foggy sees a hole in the road that reminds him of a World War II slit trench. Compo swaps his portable air raid siren for a flag pole from Auntie Wainwright.
132	2	"Adopted by a Stray"	15 January 1995	-
The trio meet Mr Broadbent, who is giving up everything to find the wilderness. He gives the trio his van, but they don't expect Mrs Broadbent to come with it. Guest appearances of Geoffrey Bayldon and Emily Perry as Mr and Mrs Broadbent
133	3	"The Defeat of the Stoneworm"	22 January 1995	-
Howard says he has stoneworm in his cellar, so the trio try to convince everyone that stoneworm are real.
134	4	"Once in a Moonlit Junkyard"	29 January 1995	-
Compo has a visit from a mysterious motorcyclist and eventually realises it could be Babs, one of his old girlfriends.
135	5	"The Space Ace"	5 February 1995	-
Stanley Pocklington is training to be an astronaut, but when he gets drunk, Foggy devises a whole training programme for him.
136	6	"The Most Powerful Eyeballs in West Yorkshire"	12 February 1995	The concluding theme tune is played by brass band at marching pace consistent with Foggy's adopted military step.
The trio have a go at hypnotherapy to help Howard take control over Pearl, but Foggy ends up hypnotising himself.
137	7	"The Dewhirsts of Ogleby Hall"	19 February 1995	-
Foggy believes he could be related to the Dewhirsts of Ogleby Hall. Compo buys Nora Batty a hat.
138	8	"The Sweet Smell of Excess"	26 February 1995	-
Compo uses his bed as a trampoline to get up to Nora Batty's window, but ends up getting stuck in the bed springs. On his release, he falls down a manhole and the trio then have to find a way to get rid of the resulting smell.

== DVD release ==
The box set for series 16 was released by Universal Playback in December 2010, mislabelled as a box set for series 17 & 18.

The Complete Series 17 & 18
Set Details
- 20 episodes
- 4-disc set
- Language: English
Release Date
Region 2
27 December 2010
