= Last of the Summer Wine series 2 =

Last of the Summer Wine
- Series 2
- Last of the Summer Wine Series 1 & 2 DVD
- No. of episodes: 7

Release
- Original network: BBC1
- Original release: 5 March – 16 April 1975

Additional information
- Filming dates: 1974

Season chronology
- ← Previous; 1 Next → 3

The second series of Last of the Summer Wine originally aired on BBC1 between 5 March and 16 April 1975. All episodes were written by Roy Clarke, and produced and directed by Bernard Thompson.

Although ratings from the first series were not good, the BBC ordered a second series of Last of the Summer Wine after the first season aired but were delayed owing to strike action. The second series was eventually produced and aired during March and April 1975. For the first time, series 2 saw two episodes make it into the top ten programs of the week, starting with the opening show, "Forked Lightning," which was watched by more than 18 million people.

Joining the cast this season was Joe Gladwin as Wally Batty, Nora Batty's henpecked husband. Series 2 would also mark the final appearance of Blamire, played by Michael Bates, who left at the end of the series owing to health problems.

The second series was released on DVD in region 2 as a combined box set with series 1 on 2 September 2002.

== Characters ==
The trio in this series consisted of Blamire (Michael Bates), Compo (Bill Owen) and Clegg (Peter Sallis). Series two was the first appearance of Wally Batty (1975–1987) and the final appearance of Cyril Blamire (1973–1975).

== Episodes ==
No. overall	No. in series	Title	Original release date	Prod. code	Disc
8	1	"Forked Lightning"	5 March 1975	LLC1196N	3
After Clegg has several extremely embarrassing accidents on his bicycle, he decides to have it repaired. After Sid attempts to fix it and fails, Clegg decides to take it to the shop in Huddersfield where he bought it 30 years ago. Not allowed to take it on the bus, the trio get a lift in a horse-box, only to discover the shop has been closed for several years. Sid tries to fix the bicycle again and, believing he has succeeded, he rides it around outside the café and crashes, sending the front wheel rolling down a hill. Guest appearance of Kenneth MacDonald.
9	2	"Who's That Dancing With Nora Batty Then?"	12 March 1975	LLC1198B	3
Compo's neighbour, Gloria (Angela Crow), is emigrating to Australia, so he decides to throw her a farewell party at Sid's Café. After borrowing a piano, Compo gets stuck up a tree while trying to transport the piano to the café. At the party, Compo gets a dance from Nora Batty, which ends after he steps on her foot. Guest appearances of Jack Woolgar First of two appearances of Janet Davies. Janet Davies is best known for playing Mrs Pike in the Dad's Army television series.
10	3	"The Changing Face of Rural Blamire"	19 March 1975	LLC1201Y	3
Blamire decides to get a job and is hired on by ShinyGlow Products, owned by a Welshman named Oswald P. Green (Gerald James). Blamire takes the company's van and, with Compo and Clegg, attempts to sell the product. Unknown to him, after accidentally spraying himself in the face, his skin turns darker, causing him to have trouble selling the product. After seeing his face in a mirror, he decides to give up, only to apply for another job after seeing an advert. On arriving, he finds the company also owned by Oswald Green.
11	4	"Some Enchanted Evening"	26 March 1975	LLC1199W	3
Compo's request for "Some Enchanted Evening" is played on the radio, dedicated to Nora. A knock at the door makes him think his luck with her has changed, but it is Wally Batty come to say goodbye. He has decided to go home to his mother. A week later, Blamire and Clegg find Compo dressed up and clean-shaven, preparing to move in with Nora. Clegg and Blamire play a trick on Compo, making him believe Wally is gone for good. First appearance of Joe Gladwin as Wally Batty. Second of two appearances of Janet Davies.
12	5	"A Quiet Drink"	2 April 1975	LLC1197H	4
The trio visit the Clothier's Arms, where one of the regular customers is a man named "Mouse" who is renowned for never buying a drink for anyone. The trio decide to con Mouse into buying a round by placing Tina, a drunken woman whose husband is carrying out dodgy business in the pub, in Mouse's car. The trio challenge Mouse to see how long they can all sit with an empty glass before one of them stands up, with the loser buying a round. Tina's husband rushes into the pub, yelling that his wife is driving around the car park in Mouse's car, causing him to stand up. Guest appearance by Larry Noble as Mouse.
13	6	"Ballad for Wind Instruments and Canoe"	9 April 1975	LLC1200E	4
After a man named Arnpepper falls out of his canoe, the trio help him retrieve it. They decide to buy it from him, but soon lose it after attempting to try it out. They attempt to retrieve it in various ways, including hanging Compo over a bridge and putting on swimwear, which works until they lose the canoe again. The trio are forced to try to get home in the swimwear.
14	7	"Northern Flying Circus"	16 April 1975	?	4
The trio purchase a motorcycle and sidecar from the widow of a friend. Compo suffers a series of mishaps trying to test it out. Last appearance of Michael Bates as Blamire

== DVD release ==
The box set for series 1 and 2 was released by Universal Playback in September 2002.

The Complete Series 1 & 2
Set Details
- 13 episodes
- 4-disc set
- Language: English
Release Date
Region 2
2 September 2002
