= Last of the Summer Wine series 6 =

Last of the Summer Wine
- Series 6
- Last of the Summer Wine Series 5 & 6 DVD
- No. of episodes: 7

Release
- Original network: BBC1
- Original release: 25 December 1981 – 15 February 1982

Additional information
- Filming dates: Series 6: 1981; Christmas special: 1981

Season chronology
- ← Previous; 5 Next → 7

The sixth series of Last of the Summer Wine originally aired on BBC1 between 4 January and 15 February 1982. All episodes were written by Roy Clarke, and produced and directed by Alan J. W. Bell.

The sixth series was released on DVD in region 2 as a combined box set with series 5 on 5 March 2007.

== Characters ==
The trio in this series consisted of Compo (Bill Owen), Clegg (Peter Sallis) and Foggy (Brian Wilde). Series 6 marked the first appearance of Wesley Pegden (1982, 1984–2002).

== Episodes ==
No. overall	No. in series	Title	Original release date	Notes
39	Christmas Special	"Whoops"	25 December 1981	The runtime of this episode is just short of 32 minutes.; This is the first time the title music, with added lyrics, was sung by the Holmfirth Choral Society. Though this is the only time the theme was sung without any musical accompaniment.; Included on Series 5 & 6 Boxset
The trio decide to look up some old school friends, to try to recapture the spirit of Christmas from the past.
40	1	"In the Service of Humanity"	4 January 1982	Cameo appearance of Tony Good
Foggy decides to start up a rescue service, and Wally is a perfect customer.
41	2	"Car & Garter"	11 January 1982	This episode marked the first ever appearance of Wesley Pegden. He would return 2 years later.
After meeting car enthusiast Wesley Pegden, Compo volunteers to test drive his car, in order to impress Nora Batty.
42	3	"The Odd Dog Men"	18 January 1982	First time we learn Foggy's real first name and middle initial – Walter C. Dewhurst.; Cameo appearances of Pam Conway and Stewart Golland
Foggy decides to open up a dog walking service.
43	4	"A Bicycle Made for Three"	25 January 1982	Guest appearance of Joe Melia; The café is redecorated in this episode.
After the trio ride, and crash, Clegg's bike, they decide that they need a bike each. A local shopkeeper lets them build their own from his spares. Meanwhile, Sid and Ivy have redecorated the café.
44	5	"One of the Last Few Places Unexplored by Man"	1 February 1982	Compo says he's never been in Nora's bedroom, yet in the previous episode of this series, "In the Service of Humanity", he goes into her bedroom when she becomes stuck under her bed.
Compo wants to have his photograph taken in Nora Batty's bedroom.
45	6	"Serenade for Tight Jeans and Metal Detector"	8 February 1982	-
Foggy persuades Compo to buy a new pair of trousers, and Clegg to buy a metal detector.
46	7	"From Wellies to Wet Suit"	15 February 1982	Cameo appearance of Jay Frankson; The water-skiing sequence would be included in a clip show episode years later when Clegg is discussing Compo with his son Tom.
Compo buys Sid's wet suit and, after a go at snorkelling, he is persuaded to take up water-skiing.

== DVD release ==
The box set for series 5 and 6 was released by Universal Playback in March 2007.

The Complete Series 5 & 6
Set Details
- 17 episodes
- 3-disc set
- Language: English
Release Date
Region 2
5 March 2007
