= Last of the Summer Wine series 21 =

Last of the Summer Wine
- Series 21
- No. of episodes: 10

Release
- Original network: BBC One
- Original release: 2 January – 4 June 2000

Additional information
- Filming dates: Millennium Special: 1999; Series 21: 1999

Season chronology
- ← Previous; 20 Next → 22

The twenty-first series of Last of the Summer Wine aired on BBC One. All of the episodes were written by Roy Clarke, and produced and directed by Alan J. W. Bell.

== Characters ==
The trio in this series consisted of Compo (Bill Owen), Clegg (Peter Sallis) and Truly (Frank Thornton). Compo appeared in only the Special and the first three episodes of this series prior to his death. Tom (Tom Owen) appeared in only four episodes of this series and became a supporting character from series 22 till the show's end. Ros Utterthwaite (2000–2005), Mrs Avery (2000–2001) and Babs Avery (2000) make their first appearances.

== Episodes ==
No. overall	No. in series	Title	Original release date	Notes
182	Millennium–Special	"Last Post and Pigeon"	2 January 2000	This special is 60 minutes long.; This special features the first appearance of Dora Bryan as Ros Utterthwaite.; Before Ros actually appeared in this episode, she had never been mentioned and it was not known that Edie, or her brother Seymour, had a sister.; This New Year special was the last ever episode to be filmed with Bill Owen as Compo and finished filming just days before he died. The BBC & crew agreed not to be credited at the closing credits but be moved to the opening credits instead, allowing for the moving final image of Compo. However, the first three episodes of Series 21 had already been filmed, thus Compo appears in them.; Guest appearance of Ray Cooney as the jovial French café-owner.; Second guest appearance of Billy Hardcastle.; Audience of 9.16m – 22nd most watched programme of the week.
Compo is selected to travel to France with a group of local WWII veterans, only to have the offer withdrawn when the organisers realise how scruffy he looks. The local ladies take pity on him and collect enough money for him to go, and Truly and Clegg join him for the trip. Meanwhile, Edie's long-estranged sister Ros shows up in town, ready to make amends with Edie and possibly settle down again. Edie, angry at her for leaving her husband and devastating their mother, isn't interested in reconnecting. In France, the trio has two goals: to release Billy Hardcastle's homing pigeon and to revisit a spot Compo and some of his fellow soldiers camped overnight after a grueling escape from the Germans. There's just one snag: Compo doesn't remember where it is.
183	1	"Lipstick and Other Problems"	2 April 2000	The first three episodes of Series 21 had already been partly filmed before Bill Owen's death. To make them complete for broadcast, scripts were reworked, camera tricks and stock shots were used, and a body double was used for far off shots. Compo is in fewer scenes, but plays a full part in those he is in.; Audience of 7.91m – 35th most watched programme of the week.
When Glenda finds Barry covered in lipstick he needs assistance from the trio to explain it away. Truly comes up with the notion of a sponsored kiss, which leaves only one problem – making it look like they've each been kissed.
184	2	"Under the Rug"	9 April 2000	Audience of 7.28m – 36th most watched programme of the week
Clegg finds himself having to model Howard's new wig after Pearl becomes suspicious. With Howard reluctant to take the wig they concoct a plan to show him attractive it makes the wearer to the ladies; roping in Smiler and Marina to help.
185	3	"Magic and the Morris Minor"	16 April 2000	This was Bill Owen's last episode as Compo (Owen died around 9 months before this episode was aired).; Audience of 7.96m – 32nd most watched programme of the week.
The trio finds a married couple stranded in a field trying to contact ancient civilizations with a Morris Minor hubcap. Meanwhile, Howard tries to carry on his relationship with Marina over two-way radio, and Barry tries to prove he's "one of the boys".
186	4	"Elegy for Fallen Wellies"	23 April 2000	This was the first episode not to feature Bill Owen as he had died before filming for the rest of this regular series would resume. The following 2 episodes were hastily written to deal with the death of Bill Owen.; The end theme is slightly different to give it a more sombre tone. This and "Just a Small Funeral" are the only two episodes to use the sombre end theme.; The first of the Compo's passing trilogy.; The first of only two instances of Truly's house appearing, named as The Nick, its other appearance being in the later episode "Waggoner's Roll".; Audience of 6.45m – 46th most watched programme of the week.
Nora, in "sexy" costume for a church pageant, takes a dare from Ivy to call Compo's bluff and present herself on his doorstep. The unexpected result is that he collapses and has to be rushed to the hospital. Although Clegg and Truly expect the best, Compo dies as the doctors try to save him. Cleggy and Truly, as well as Nora and Ivy, spend the night remembering him and trying to figure out how to give him a proper send-off.
187	5	"Surprise at Throstlenest"	30 April 2000	Guest star Liz Fraser as Reggie Unsworth.; The second of the Compo's passing trilogy.; Audience of 7.23m – 31st most watched programme of the week.
Clegg and Truly find out a few unexpected things about Compo as they take his ferrets to their new home.
188	6	"Just a Small Funeral"	7 May 2000	The Val Stokes Singers sing the theme tune for its third and final time, this time with lyrics rewritten to reflect Compo's death.; The end theme is again given a more sombre tone.; The third and final of the Compo's passing trilogy; Guest star Liz Fraser as Reggie Unsworth.; Audience of 7.86m – 25th most watched programme of the week.
As the funeral approaches, Howard struggles with having two dates for the occasion, Barry tries to conceal his engine noises from Wesley, and Compo's lady friend Regina is in desperate need of an appropriate dress.
189	7	"From Here to Paternity"	14 May 2000	This marks the first appearance of Tom alongside that of Mrs Avery and Babs.; Audience of 6.81m – 33rd most watched programme of the week.
Nora intercepts a letter from Compo's son, Tom, whom Compo didn't know about until shortly before he died. They learn that Tom doesn't know about his father's death and is coming to town for a visit.
190	8	"Some Vans Can Make you Deaf"	21 May 2000	Ros becomes a regular character from this episode.; Audience of 7.54m – 29th most watched programme of the week.
While others unite in the effort to repair his tatty van, Tom does his best to avoid lifting a finger to help.
191	9	"Waggoner's Roll"	18 May 2000	Audience of 7.13m – 33rd most watched programme of the week.; Second and final appearance of Truly's house, "The Nick".
Tom decides Babs is destined for showbiz, even though Babs herself wants nothing to do with it. Barry quickly becomes another unwilling participant in the act.
192	10	"I Didn't Know Barry Could Play"	4 June 2000	Third and final appearance of Babs.; Audience of 6.97m – 36th most watched programme of the week.
Picking up "music" for Babs turns out to be a deceptively simple-sounding task for Clegg, Truly and Barry.

== DVD release ==
The box set for series twenty-one was released by Universal Playback in March 2012, mislabelled as a box set for series 21 & 22.

The Complete Series 21 & 22
Set Details
- 21 episodes
- 4-disc set
- Language: English
Release Date
Region 2
26 March 2012
