= Alan J. W. Bell =

British television producer and director (1937–2023)

- Born: Alan James William Bell; 14 November 1937; Battersea, London, England
- Died: 19 October 2023 (aged 85)
- Occupation(s): Producer director
- Years active: 1973–2014
- Notable work: Last of the Summer Wine; Ripping Yarns
- Spouse: Constance Carling

Alan James William Bell (14 November 1937 – 19 October 2023) was a British television producer and director.

== Early life ==
Bell was born in Battersea, London, on 14 November 1937.

== Career ==
Bell worked on many BBC series from the early 1970s, most notably Last of the Summer Wine, producing and directing 250 episodes from 1981 until the series ended in 2010, Ripping Yarns, and the television adaptation of The Hitchhiker's Guide to the Galaxy. He was also assigned to re-edit and improve Ronnie Barker's short 1982 film, By the Sea. Other comedy shows included There's a Lot of it About, The Hello Goodbye Man, The Clairvoyant, Wyatt's Watchdogs, Dogfood Dan and the Carmarthen Cowboy, and Split Ends.

In 1999, Bell directed the television film Lost for Words. The film was adapted from the autobiographical book of the same title by Deric Longden. It was a sequel to Longden's earlier autobiographical film Wide-Eyed and Legless (known as The Wedding Gift in the USA). It dealt with Deric's mother Annie (Thora Hird), her decline into dementia and how Deric (Pete Postlethwaite) and his wife, partially-sighted novelist Aileen Armitage (Penny Downie), coped with this. For her performance, Hird won the 2000 BAFTA for Best Actress, the 1999 RTS Award for Best Actor - Female, as well as the 1999 National Television Award for Most Popular Actress. The film also won a 1999 Peabody Award and the 1999 International Emmy for Best Drama.

Bell died on 19 October 2023, aged 85.
