= Screen One =

British television series

- Genre: Drama
- Written by: Various
- Directed by: Various
- Starring: Various
- Composers: Michael Storey; Bill Connor; Ilona Sekacz; Colin Towns et al.
- Country of origin: United Kingdom
- Original language: English
- No. of series: 7
- No. of episodes: 60

Production
- Executive producers: Richard Broke; Margaret Matheston et al.
- Producers: Ruth Caleb; Andrée Molyneux et al.
- Cinematography: John McGlashan et al.
- Editor: Ken Pearce et al.
- Running time: 90 minutes (approx.)
- Production company: BBC

Original release
- Network: BBC1
- Release: 10 September 1989 – 15 February 1998

Screen One is a British television anthology drama series, produced by the BBC and distributed by BBC Worldwide, that was transmitted on BBC One from 1989 to 1998. A total of six series were broadcast, incorporating sixty individual films, several of which were broadcast as stand-alone specials. The series was born following the demise of the BBC's Play for Today, which ran from 1970 to 1984. Producer Kenith Trodd was asked to formulate a new series of one-off television dramas, the result of which was Screen Two, which began broadcasting on BBC2 in 1985. However, while Play for Today's style had often been a largely studio-based form of theatre on television, Screen Two was shot entirely on film. Three of the episodes ("The Accountant", "News Hounds" and "A Question of Attribution") won the BAFTA TV Award for Best Single Drama.

In 1989, the series was adapted for more mainstream audiences on BBC1, and Screen One was born to follow the lead taken by Channel 4, several of whose many television films had later been released in cinemas.

== Talent ==
Screen One attracted many names familiar to television and film audiences, including the likes of Peggy Ashcroft, Alfred Molina, Sean Bean, David Thewlis, Ray Winstone, Alan Bates, Judi Dench, James Fox, Keith Allen, Bob Peck, Alun Armstrong, Marina Sirtis, David Jason, Brenda Blethyn, James Bolam, Adrian Edmondson, Alison Steadman, Timothy West, Clive Russell, Helen Baxendale, Janet McTeer and Michael Murphy. Several actors also made their on-screen debuts during the series, including Keira Knightley in the fifth series episode Royal Celebration.

== Demise ==
By 1993, the prevailing mood within the BBC was to move away from single dramas and concentrate production on series and serials, and as such, a reduced six-episode series, broadcast in 1994, was to be the last full-length series of Screen One, although a further eight one-off specials followed up to 1998.

== Transmissions ==
Series	Episodes	Originally released	
Series	Episodes	First released	Last released
1	8 (7 + 1 Special)	10 September 1989	27 December 1989
2	10 (8 + 2 Specials)	2 September 1990	1 January 1991
3	10 (8 + 2 Specials)	20 June 1991	1 January 1992
4	9 (8 + 1 Special)	6 September 1992	31 October 1992
5	8	5 September 1993	24 October 1993
6	7 (6 + 1 Special)	6 February 1994	16 October 1994
7	8 (8 Specials)	20 January 1995	15 February 1998

== Episodes ==
=== Series 1 (1989) ===
No. in series	Title	Directed by	Written by	Original release date
1	"One Way Out"	Robert Young	Mick Ford	10 September 1989
Starring Bob Peck, Denis Lawson, Samantha Bond and Enn Reitel
2	"Nineteen 96"	Karl Francis	G. F. Newman	17 September 1989
Starring Keith Barron, Alun Armstrong, Keith Allen, Dudley Sutton, Roger Brierley, Clyde Pollitt and Roger Nott
3	"The Accountant"	Les Blair	Geoffrey Case	24 September 1989
Starring Alfred Molina and David Graham
4	"Home Run"	Nicholas Renton	Andy Armitage	1 October 1989
Starring Michael Kitchen, Tom Georgeson, Keith Barron, Dean Harris, Dominic Jephcott, Christine Kavanagh and Andrew Powell
5	"She's Been Away"	Peter Hall	Stephen Poliakoff	8 October 1989
Starring Peggy Ashcroft, James Fox, Michael Carter, Rosalie Crutchley, Donald Douglas, David Hargreaves, Geraldine James, Hugh Lloyd, René Zagger and Barnaby Holm
6	"The Mountain and the Molehill"	Moira Armstrong	David Reid	15 October 1989
Starring Michael Gough, John Carson, Paul Brooke, Roger Brierley, Peter Howell, Ian Thompson and James Appleby
7	"Blore M.P."	Robert Young	Robin Chapman	22 October 1989
Starring Maggie O'Neill, Timothy West, Oscar Quitak, James Warwick, Paul Daneman, Rowena Cooper, Jill Baker, Susie Blake, Barry Jackson, Stephen Moore, Edward Cast, Ray Winstone, Joan Bakewell and David Jackson. (Based on the novel Scandal, by A.N. Wilson).
8	"Ball-Trap on the Cote Sauvage"	Jack Gold	Andrew Davies	27 December 1989
Special. Starring Jack Shepherd, Zoë Wanamaker, Miranda Richardson and Michael Kitchen

=== Series 2 (1990—1991) ===
No. in series	Title	Directed by	Written by	Original release date
1	"News Hounds"	Les Blair	Les Blair	2 September 1990
Starring Adrian Edmondson, Alison Steadman, Steven Mackintosh, Edwina Currie, Paul Kember and Nigel Pegram
2	"Frankenstein's Baby"	Robert Bierman	Emma Tennant	9 September 1990
Starring Nigel Planer, Kate Buffery and Elizabeth Carling
3	"The Police"	Ian Knox	Arthur Ellis	16 September 1990
Starring Oliver Ford Davies, Derek Martin, Arbel Jones and Paul Collins
4	"Sweet Nothing"	Tony Smith	Vincent O'Connell	23 September 1990
Starring Lee Ross, Charlotte Coleman, Simon Cadell, Victor Maddern and Michael Melia
5	"Can You Hear Me Thinking?"	Christopher Morahan	Monty Haltrecht & Beverley Marcus	30 September 1990
Starring Judi Dench, Michael Williams, Richard Henders, Charmian May, Pik-Sen Lim, Cyril Shaps, Sally Bretton and Christopher Burgess: Released on DVD on 5 November 2007 as part of The Judi Dench Collection.
6	"One Last Chance"	Gabrielle Beaumont	Andrew Kazamia	7 October 1990
Starring Marina Sirtis, Bernard Spear and Eileen Way
7	"Sticky Wickets"	Dewi Humphreys	Fletcher Watkins	14 October 1990
Starring Alun Armstrong, James Bolam, Gillian Elisa, George Sewell and William Thomas
8	"Survival of the Fittest"	Martyn Friend	Julian Mitchell	21 October 1990
Starring Timothy West, Jean Anderson, Nerys Hughes and Elizabeth Spriggs
9	"Dark City"	Chris Curling	David Lan	11 December 1990
Special. Starring Sello Maake Ka-Ncube, Vusi Dibakwane and Thapelo Mafokeng
10	"Happy Feet"	Michael Bradwell	Michael Bradwell	1 January 1991
Special. Starring Phyllis Logan, Jim Broadbent, Derrick O'Connor and Chris Jury

=== Series 3 (1991—1992) ===
No. in series	Title	Directed by	Written by	Original release date
1	"Skulduggery"	Phil Davis	Phil Davis	20 June 1991
Special. Starring David Thewlis, Robin Weaver, Patsy Palmer, Charlie Creed-Miles, Jake Wood and Robert Pugh
2	"Hancock"	Tony Smith	William Humble	1 September 1991
Starring Alfred Molina, Frances Barber, Clive Russell, Paul Brooke, Kenneth Gilbert and Nick Burnell
3	"Tell Me That You Love Me"	Bruce MacDonald	Adrian Hodges	8 September 1991
Starring Judith Scott, Sean Bean, James Wilby, Michael Cochrane and Barbara Ward
4	"Filipina Dreamgirls"	Les Blair	Andrew Davies	15 September 1991
Starring Bill Maynard, Charlie Drake, David Thewlis, Geoffrey Hutchings and Lee Cornes
5	"Dancin' Thru the Dark"	Mike Ockrent	Willy Russell	22 September 1991
Linda is out on her hen night, while her fiance is out on his stag night. Linda is having major doubts about getting married. When both groups arrive at a club, they find the band fronted by her ex-boyfriend—and the love of her life—Peter. Linda has to decide: does she stay and settle down, like her friends want her to, or does she chuck it all in and run away with Peter? Starring Claire Hackett, Con O'Neill, Julia Deakin, Simon O'Brien and Mark Womack: Based on the play Stags and Hens. Released on DVD on 26 March 2012.
6	"Ex"	Paul Seed	William Humble	29 September 1991
Starring Griff Rhys Jones, Geraldine James, Penny Downie, Dermot Crowley, Mary Jo Randle, Bruce Montague and Colin Douglas
7	"Prince"	David Wheatley	Julie Burchill	6 October 1991
Starring Sean Bean, Janet McTeer, Celia Montague and Jackie McGuire
8	"Alive and Kicking"	Robert Young	Al Hunter Ashton	13 October 1991
Stevie "Smudger" Smith is a heroin dealer and an addict. His wife Marie is also an addict, and when their baby, Jason, is born he is addicted too. When Jason is taken into care, Marie leaves Smudger to get clean and win Jason back, with the help of unorthodox drug counsellor Liam Kane. Stevie and Liam are soon at loggerheads as Stevie wants his wife and son back, but realises he can only do this if he also gets clean. In trouble with his old gang and his rivals, he does so, but has no interest in the conventional rehabilitation on offer. He decides to form a football team of recovering addicts, helped by his old coach, Earl. Starring Lenny Henry, Robbie Coltrane, Jane Horrocks, Paul Barber, Annabelle Apsion, Imogen Boorman, Geff Francis, Jillie Meers and Sakuntala Ramanee
9	"A Question of Attribution"	John Schlesinger	Alan Bennett	20 October 1991
Starring James Fox, Prunella Scales, Geoffrey Palmer, David Calder, John Cater and Edward de Souza: Adapted from the Alan Bennett play. Won the 1992 BAFTA Award for Best Single Drama. Prunella Scales was also nominated for Best Actress. Released on DVD on 26 October 2009 as part of Alan Bennett at the BBC.
10	"Adam Bede"	Giles Foster	Maggie Wadey	1 January 1992
Special. Starring Patsy Kensit, Julia McKenzie, Jean Marsh, Freddie Jones, Paul Brooke, Patsy Byrne, Roy Evans, Edward Jewesbury and Michael Robbins: Released on Region 1 DVD in 2007.

=== Series 4 (1992) ===
No. in series	Title	Directed by	Written by	Original release date
1	"A Very Polish Practice"	David Tucker	Andrew Davies	6 September 1992
Starring Peter Davison, David Troughton, Joanna Kanska, Alfred Molina and Gertan Klauber: A spin off from the comedy drama series A Very Peculiar Practice. Released together with the series on DVD.
2	"Disaster at Valdez"	Paul Seed	Michael Baker	13 September 1992
Starring Christopher Lloyd, John Heard, Rip Torn, Michael Murphy and Paul Guilfoyle
3	"Born Kicking"	Mandie Fletcher	Barry Hines	20 September 1992
Starring John Abineri, Nicholas Courtney, Norman Bird, Thomas Craig, George Irving, Terry Wogan, David McAlister, Sheila Ruskin, Garfield Morgan, Norman Mitchell and Martin Cochrane
4	"Black and Blue"	David Hayman	G. F. Newman	27 September 1992
Starring Linus Roache, Martin Shaw, Iain Glen, Ray Winstone, David Morrissey, Don Henderson, David Thewlis, Madhav Sharma and Colin McFarlane
5	"Seconds Out"	Bruce MacDonald	Lynda La Plante	4 October 1992
Starring Steven Waddington, Tom Bell, Derek Newark, Jack Watson, Nick Brimble, Frank Mills, Thomas Craig, Tim Barlow, Eric Mason and Roy Heather
6	"Running Late"	Udayan Prasad	Simon Gray	11 October 1992
Starring Peter Bowles, Michael Byrne, James Fleet, Jim McManus, Ian McNeice and Roshan Seth
7	"Losing Track"	Jim Lee	Roger Eldridge	18 October 1992
Starring Alan Bates, Geraldine James and Michael Culver
8	"Trust Me"	Tony Dow	Tony Sarchet	25 October 1992
Starring Alfred Molina, Hywel Bennett, Jill Gascoine, Roger Lloyd-Pack, Edna Doré, Harry Towb, Derek Benfield and David Simeon
9	"Ghostwatch"	Lesley Manning	Stephen Volk	31 October 1992
Special. Starring Michael Parkinson, Sarah Greene, Mike Smith and Craig Charles: Released on DVD on 25 November 2002.

=== Series 5 (1993) ===
No. in series	Title	Directed by	Written by	Original release date
1	"Wide-Eyed and Legless"	Richard Loncraine	Deric Longden & Jack Rosenthal	5 September 1993
Starring Julie Walters, Jim Broadbent, Thora Hird and Moya Brady: Later released in cinemas. Retitled The Wedding Gift in America. Released on Region 1 DVD in 2011.
2	"A Foreign Field"	Charles Sturridge	Roy Clarke	12 September 1993
Starring Alec Guinness, Leo McKern, Geraldine Chaplin, Lauren Bacall, Jeanne Moreau and Dorothy Grumbar: Later released in cinemas. Released on DVD on 3 August 2008.
3	"Down Among the Big Boys"	Charles Gormley	Peter McDougall	19 September 1993
Louie, the Glasgow detective son of a policeman, is about to marry the daughter of the accomplished robbery chief JoJo. Louie is placed in charge of investigating a mystery thief before his wedding. Jojo comes to realize that Louie is looking for him and wrestles with how to handle this. Starring Douglas Henshall, Billy Connolly, John Murtagh, Ewan Stewart, Maggie Bell and Ashley Jensen: Released on DVD on 25 September 2006.
4	"Royal Celebration"	Ferdinand Fairfax	William Humble	26 September 1993
Starring Kenneth Cranham, Minnie Driver, Rupert Graves, Leslie Phillips, Keira Knightley and Gordon Salkilld. This was Knightley's first screen appearance.
5	"Tender Loving Care"	Dewi Humphreys	Lucy Gannon	3 October 1993
Starring Dawn French, Rosemary Leach, Joan Sims, Peter Jones and Llewellyn Rees
6	"Money for Nothing"	Mike Ockrent	Tim Firth	10 October 1993
Starring Julian Glover, Martin Short, Christien Anholt, Paul Reynolds, Tim Preece, Wolf Kahler and Sean Baker
7	"Wall of Silence"	Philip Saville	Maurice Gran & Laurence Marks	17 October 1993
Starring Bill Paterson, Warren Mitchell, Timothy Busfield, John Bowe and Brigitte Kahn
8	"The Bullion Boys"	Christopher Morahan	Jim Hitchmough	24 October 1993
The true story of how Britain's gold reserve was secretly transferred to Liverpool at the start of the Second World War. Starring David Jason, Tim Pigott-Smith, Gorden Kaye, Brenda Blethyn, Geoffrey Hutchings and Paul Angelis: Won the 1994 International Emmy Award for Drama.

=== Series 6 (1994) ===
No. in series	Title	Directed by	Written by	Original release date
1	"Bambino Mio"	Edward Bennett	Colin Welland	6 February 1994
Special. Starring Julie Walters, Georges Corraface, John McArdle and Orlando Urdaneta: Released on VHS on 24 January 2000.
2	"A Breed of Heroes"	Diarmuid Lawrence	Charles Wood	4 September 1994
Starring Samuel West, Robert Bathurst, Alexander Armstrong, Daniel Flynn, Julian Rhind-Tutt, Jonathan Firth, Richard Griffiths and Shaun Dingwall
3	"Pat and Margaret"	Gavin Millar	Victoria Wood	11 September 1994
Starring Victoria Wood, Julie Walters, Celia Imrie, Don Henderson, Duncan Preston, Thora Hird, Julie Hesmondhalgh, Shirley Stelfox, Roger Brierley, Tenniel Evans and Charles Pemberton: Released on DVD on 21 May 2007.
4	"Two Golden Balls"	Anya Camilleri	Maureen Chadwick	18 September 1994
Starring Kim Cattrall, Claire Skinner, Christopher Ellison, Rowena King and Leslie Phillips
5	"Meat"	John Madden	Daniel Boyle	25 September 1994
Starring Jonny Lee Miller, Sarah-Jane Potts, Peter Wight and John Simm
6	"Murder in Mind"	Robert Bierman	Jenny Diski	2 October 1994
Starring Cathryn Harrison, Trevor Eve, Anna Massey, Steven Mackintosh, Bruce Alexander and Christopher Owen
7	"Doggin' Around"	Desmond Davis	Alan Plater	16 October 1994
Starring Elliott Gould, Geraldine James, Alun Armstrong, Ewan McGregor, Liz Smith, Ronnie Scott, Stephen Marcus, Jamie Foreman, Larry Lamb, Judy Flynn and Tony Caunter

=== Specials (1995–1998) ===
No. in series	Title	Directed by	Written by	Original release date
1	"The Plant"	Jonathan Lewis	Jonathan Lewis	20 January 1995
Starring Joanna Roth, Valentine Pelka, Eoin McCarthy, Sally Dexter and Ian Burfield
2	"Trip Trap"	Danny Hiller	Lucy Gannon	9 March 1996
Starring Kevin Whately, Stella Gonet, Sue Roderick and Helen Griffin
3	"Killing Me Softly"	Stephen Whittaker	Rebecca Frayn	7 July 1996
Starring Maggie O'Neill, Peter Howitt, Julian Kerridge and Annabelle Apsion
4	"Truth or Dare"	John Madden	Unknown	31 August 1996
Starring John Hannah, Helen Baxendale, Susan Lynch, Ben Daniels, John Fraser and John Michie
5	"Gobble"	Jimmy Mulville	Ian Hislop & Nick Newman	15 February 1997
Starring Kevin Whately, Keith Barron, Jack Dee and Peter Egan
6	"Deacon Brodie"	Philip Saville	Simon Donald	8 March 1997
Starring Billy Connolly, Patrick Malahide, Catherine McCormack, Lorcan Cranitch and Siobhan Redmond
7	"Hostile Waters"	David Drury	Troy Kennedy-Martin	26 July 1997
Starring Rutger Hauer, Martin Sheen, Max Von Sydow, Colm Feore and Michael Attwell: Released on VHS in 1998
8	"Our Boy"	David Evans	Tony Grounds	15 February 1998
Starring Ray Winstone, Pauline Quirke, Neil Dudgeon and Philip Jackson

== See also ==
Other BBC drama anthology series include:

- The Play on One
- The Wednesday Play
- Theatre 625
- Thirty-Minute Theatre
- Play for Today
- Play for Tomorrow
- Play of the Month
- Playhouse
- Stage 2
- Screen Two
- ScreenPlay
- Second City Firsts
- Thursday Theatre
- Theatre Night
- Performance
