= Farrington of the F.O. =

- Created by: Dick Sharples
- Directed by: Ronnie Baxter; Don Clayton
- Starring: Angela Thorne; Joan Sims; John Quayle; Tony Haygarth; Freddie Earlle; Judy Cornwell
- Composers: Alan Parker; Alan Hawkshaw
- Country of origin: United Kingdom
- Original language: English
- No. of series: 2
- No. of episodes: 14

Production
- Running time: 30 minutes
- Production company: Yorkshire Television

Original release
- Network: ITV
- Release: 13 February 1986 – 15 July 1987

Farrington of the F.O. is a British television comedy series by Dick Sharples about the staff of the British Consulate in "one of the armpits of Latin America". It was produced by Yorkshire Television and broadcast from 1986 to 1987. Its second, and final, series was simply called Farrington.

== Plot ==
Harriet Farrington arrives to take charge at a small, unimportant British Consulate in an undisclosed Central or South American country. She is horrified to find out how indolent and scheming her staff are, and - with more than a hint of Margaret Thatcher about her mannerisms - sets out to turn the Consulate around.

== Characters ==
The major protagonists were:

- Harriet Farrington (Angela Thorne), the strict, no-nonsense new Consul-General. In Episode 1 she introduces herself as "the diplomatic bag".
- Annie Begley (Joan Sims), Harriet's only friend at the consulate, and the least incompetent of her staff.
- Major Percival Willoughby-Gore (John Quayle), a devious, lecherous, upper-class twit - and Harriet's would-be nemesis who hates the fact that a woman could hold the post of Consul-General. He is also the Ambassador's nephew. Sadly, he's not quite as clever as Harriet and finds his schemes are frequently found out and squashed by her.
- Fidel Sanchez (Tony Haygarth), the consulate's resident chauffeur. He always has his eye out to find ways to make a bit more cash – but grows strangely fond of Harriet as time goes on.
- Miguel (Freddie Earlle), a jovial, but incompetent relative of Fidel. Miguel appears in two episodes of series two, although Earlle also appeared as a different character in series one.
- Sarah Lawrence (Judy Cornwell) is Harriet's recently divorced houseguest. She horrifies her hostess by falling for the bumbling charms of Major Percy. Sarah appears in two episodes of series two.

Notable guest stars throughout the run of the two series included (in no particular order) Tim Barrett, Francesca Gonshaw, Jan Ravens, Ralph Bates, Annette Crosbie, Russell Hunter, Roger Hammond, Veronica Doran, Kevin Lloyd, Elizabeth Sellars, Edward de Souza, Robin Parkinson, Patsy Smart, and John Moreno. Sharples' earlier comedy shows included In Loving Memory and Hallelujah!.

== Series ==
- Farrington of the F.O. — (1986) — Yorkshire Television
  - First series (7 episodes) broadcast from 13 February to 27 March 1986
- Farrington — (1987) — Yorkshire Television
  - Second series (7 episodes) broadcast from 3 June to 15 July 1987

== Press Pack, Series Two ==
The following information is taken from the Press Pack released by Yorkshire TV to help publicise the series.

- Carmen Gómez, who played Juanita in series 2, episode 1, and Delores Alvarez in series 2, episode 3, was born in North Africa and grew up in Gibraltar. She started her career presenting children's TV programme Romper Room. Her first book (Happy Musician) was due to be published at the same time she appeared in Farrington. Her brother is William Gomez, the classical guitarist and composer.
- Tony Haygarth did not appear in series 2, episode 4 (We're Having a Heatwave) because he became snow-bound in Kent and was unable to reach Yorkshire TV's Leeds studios. Writer Dick Sharples performed a hasty re-write on the episode's script, and created the character of Miguel (played by Freddie Earlle) to cover for the absent Sanchez. As a 'thank-you' to Earlle, Miguel was also written into the following episode Who Wants to be a Billionaire?. Earlle had previously appeared in the final episode of series 1 as a particularly inept bandito chef.
- The final scene in the final episode featured Harriet Farrington on board a British Airways jet. However, the actors never left the ground as they were filmed in a replica of a first-class cabin owned by the airline company. The company kept the set to help with stills, publicity and filming.
