= Simpkin =

Simpkin may refer to:

- Simpkin (surname)
- Simpkin, a fictional cat in The Tailor of Gloucester (1903) by Beatrix Potter
- Simpkin, the traditional name of the mouser of Hertford College, Oxford
- A. L. Simpkin & Co. Ltd, English confectionery makers
- Simpkin & Marshall, British bookseller, book wholesaler, and book publisher
