= Dick Sharples =

British scriptwriter (1921–2015)

- Born: 7 June 1927; Manchester, England
- Died: 19 October 2015 (aged 88); London England
- Occupation: Scriptwriter
- Writing career
- Period: 1956–2015
- Genre: Television
- Notable works: Joan and Leslie (1956–1958); Three Live Wires (1961); In Loving Memory (1969, 1979–1986); Hallelujah! (1983–1984); Farrington of the F.O. (1986–1987)

Dick Sharples (7 June 1927 – 19 October 2015) was a British TV scriptwriter of British sitcoms. He has also written novels, plays and drama series (for both television and radio).

== Life and career ==
Dick Sharples was born in Manchester. He began his career as a cartoonist and a writer for a Manchester Advertising Agency. One of the agency's customers was comedian Al Read who ran a meat pie company called H. Read and Son. Sharples wrote the tagline "potatoes and meat, simply heat" for the company's fritters.

A chance meeting with a local, jobbing printer called Archie Carmichael led to Sharples writing his first novel whilst still a teenager. The Man Who Rode By Night was a 40,000-word Western, and led to Sharples being paid 21 shillings for every thousand words.

One of Sharples' first television writing credits was for the 1956 ATV series Joan and Leslie, starring Harry Towb and Noel Dyson. Other early television work included writing episodes of soap opera Compact, drama series The Saint, and Dixon of Dock Green. Early screenplays included collaborating with Gerald Kelsey (one of the Joan and Leslie co-writers) on the 1961 comedy film The Golden Rabbit which starred Willoughby Goddard.

Up to now, Sharples had concentrated on delivering scripts for other peoples' series. This was, however, soon to change. In 1969 Sharples wrote a one-off comedy episode called In Loving Memory. Broadcast on 4 November 1969, the story was based in a rural Yorkshire undertakers. It starred Edward Chapman as Jeremiah Unsworth, and Marjorie Rhodes as his wife Ivy. Also cast was Christopher Beeny as Ivy's slightly silly nephew. Almost ten years later, the Unsworths returned to television in a seven part series. Christopher Beeny returned to the role of nephew Billy, but the other roles were re-cast. Thora Hird took on the role of Ivy, whilst Freddie Jones played Jeremiah. The first episode of the series was broadcast on 21 May 1979 and ran for five series, the final episode being broadcast on 27 March 1986. In the long gap between the pilot and the first series, Sharples worked on many other series, including a four-year stint as script editor on the UK version of General Hospital.

Sharples had proved himself as a writer who could carry a long-running series, so it was inevitable that further shows would follow. In 1983, Sharples penned another Thora Hird comedy vehicle called Hallelujah!. Running for two series, it was set in a Northern branch of the Salvation Army and co-starred Patsy Rowlands.

With In Loving Memory coming to an end, Sharples turned to writing Farrington of the F.O., a sitcom starring Angela Thorne as the eponymous Farrington. Set in a British consulate in an unidentified Latin American country, the series co-starred Joan Sims who had made several guest appearances for Sharples in In Loving Memory. For the second series, the title was modified to simply Farrington, and the show came to an end after 14 episodes. On 19 October 2015, he died at the age of 88.

== Later career ==
After writing a 1990 episode of the Thames Television series The Bill, Sharples was contacted by Belgische Radio en Televisie about their proposed re-make of In Loving Memory. Renamed R.I.P., many episodes followed the original Sharples storylines, and the series ran from 1992 to 1994.

Also in 1990, Sharples published another novel Soap in the Afternoon: The Secret Life of Angie St. Clair, Night Nurse Extraordinary, followed by Getting Even: The Biggest Heist in History in 2007, which is hoped to be made into a major movie. Sharples has written other novels, Idunno Jenkins and the River of No Return, and Village in Aspic (both were published as ebooks in 2012), along with the autobiographical I Found the Time and Situation Tragedy (both from 2012).

== Selected TV writing credits ==
- Joan and Leslie (1956)
- All Aboard (1958)
- No Hiding Place (1960)
- Compact (1962)
- The Saint (1962)
- United! (1965)
- Adam Adamant Lives! (1966–67)
- Dr. Finlay's Casebook (1965–69)
- Joan and Leslie (1969)
- Never Mind the Quality, Feel the Width (1971)
- In Loving Memory (1969, 1979–86)
- The Nesbitts Are Coming (1980)
- Hallelujah! (1983–84)
- Farrington of the F.O. (1986–87)
- The Bill (1990)

== Selected radio writing credit ==
- Dr Finlay's Casebook (1970–2)

== Selected film writing credits ==
- The Golden Rabbit (1961)
- George and Mildred (1980)

== Unmade television script ==
- Doctor Who: The Prison in Space, aka The Amazons (late 1960s) NB This script was made into a non-full-cast radio drama by Big Finish Productions in 2011.
