= Aileen Armitage =

English author

- Born: 1930 (age 95–96); Luton, Bedfordshire, England
- Education: Hull University
- Known for: being depicted in Wide-Eyed and Legless and Lost for Words
- Spouses: Peter Quigley (m. 1954, divorced) Deric Longden (m. 1990; died 2013)
- Children: 4 children and 2 stepchildren
- Writing career
- Pen name: Ruth Fabian; Erica Lindley; Aileen Quigley
- Language: English
- Genre: Historical novel

Aileen Longden (pen names Ruth Fabian, Erica Lindley, Aileen Quigley and better known by her maiden name Aileen Armitage) is a British writer and public speaker. She is the author of more than thirty-five historical novels. She is partially-sighted and legally blind.

== Life and career ==
Armitage was born in Luton, Bedfordshire in 1930, daughter of Eric Armitage and Evelyn Armitage (née Colgan) who were married in 1929. She grew up in Huddersfield, West Yorkshire, where her father's family had already lived for about 400 years. The family house was in Lindley Moor near Huddersfield. Her grandfather owned a mill in this area. Armitage studied Modern Languages at Hull University gaining a BA. She became a teacher, but ten years later, due to failing eyesight she had to give up teaching. In 1967, she took a creative writing class through night school and began writing at night with a felt tip pen. She had numerous magazine articles and short stories published before she turned to longer fiction.

Armitage's first novel was accepted by a publisher, who asked her to write more. She has since been widely published in the UK and in the US. She has written under the names Ruth Fabian, Erica Lindley, Aileen Quigley and Aileen Armitage and has had more than thirty-five historical novels published. In the UK, Armitage is a high Public Lending Right earner.

== Personal life ==
In 1954 Armitage married Peter Quigley, with whom she had four children, two sons and two daughters. The marriage later ended in divorce.

In 1984, she met writer Deric Longden (who at that time was married to his first wife Diana), at a writers' conference. At the conference they discussed writing a television script together about disability, with Longden's wife Diana, at the heart of the story. Diana Longden had an illness which baffled doctors, left her wheelchair-reliant and in almost constant pain. The illness was later believed to be chronic fatigue syndrome or myalgic encephalomyelitis.

Armitage and Diana became devoted friends, notwithstanding the evident attraction Deric Longden and Armitage felt for one another; indeed, Diana hoped that they would marry after her death. Diana Longden died in 1985.

Armitage and Longden moved to Huddersfield. Armitage married Longden in 1990.

On 19 November 2012, Longden was diagnosed with terminal cancer and died of cancer of the oesophagus on 23 June 2013.

== Books and television films ==
=== Wide Eyed and Legless a.k.a. The Wedding Gift ===
Armitage's life from when she first met Deric Longden is included in Longden's 1989 novel Diana's Story, later made into a television film Wide-Eyed and Legless (1993) (known in the US as The Wedding Gift). Armitage is played by actress Sian Thomas whilst Longden is played by Jim Broadbent. Diana Longden is played by Julie Walters. Thora Hird plays Longden's mother Annie Mary Longden (23 August 1910 – 1988).

=== Lost For Words ===
Longden's book Lost For Words (1991), which continues the story of his life with Armitage and his eccentric mother, was also made into a television film, Lost for Words (1999), in which Penny Downie plays Armitage and Pete Postlethwaite plays Longden. Thora Hird reprises her role as Annie Longden. Armitage has a cameo as a voice on an answerphone, as does Longden. The film won the Emmy for best foreign drama and a BAFTA for Hird as best actress. The film was repeated on ITV in 2012, following the death of Postlethwaite.

== Awards ==
In 1988, Armitage received the Frink Woman of the Year Award. In November 2002 Armitage and her husband were awarded honorary Doctor of Literature degree by University of Huddersfield. International Emmy 1999, Nominated for a BAFTA, Winner of the Peabody Prize and Le Priz Crystale all for the TV film Lost For Words, co-written with husband Deric Longden.

== Works ==
- Child of Fire, 1971
- King's Pawn, 1971
- Shadow of Dungeon Wood, 1972
- Bloodstone, 1972
- A Theft of Honour, 1972
- Rose Brocade, 1972
- A Scent of Violets, 1973
- A Devil in Holy Orders, 1973
- King Bastard. The Story of William the Conqueror, 1973
- Court Cadenza, 1974
- Empress to the Eagle, 1975
- The Radley Curse, 1975
- The Brackenroyd Inheritance, 1976
- The Devil in Crystal, 1979
- Harvest of Destiny, 1979
- Jacob's Well, 1981
- Hawksmoor, 1981 (Hawksmoor series)
- Pipistrelle, 1982
- A Dark Moon Raging, 1982 (Hawksmoor series)
- Hunter's Moon, 1984 (Hawksmoor series)
- Touchstone, 1987 (Hawksmoor series)
- Chapter of Innocence, 1988
- Hawkrise, 1988 (Hawksmoor series)
- Chapter of Echoes, 1989
- Chapter of Shadows, 1990
- A Midnight Smile, 1993
- The Jericho Years, 1994
- Cedar Street, 1995 (Hawksmoor series)
- Cambermere, 1995
- Annabella, 1996
- The Dark Arches, 1996 (Hawksmoor series)
- Jason's Dominion, 1997
- Mallory Keep, 1998
- The Seamstress, 1999
- A Winter Serpent, 1999
- A Passionate Cause, 2000
- A Double Sacrifice, 2001
- To Catch and Conquer, 2001
- Willerby Manor, 2002
- Flames of Fortune, 2002
- Conflict of Interest, 2005
- The Tudor Sisters, 2005
