= Christopher Beeny =

British actor (1941–2020)

- Born: Christopher Winton Beeny; 7 July 1941; London, England
- Died: 3 January 2020 (aged 78); Kent, England
- Education: Arts Educational School; Royal Academy of Dramatic Art
- Occupations: Actor, dancer
- Years active: 1947–2010
- Employer: Ballet Rambert
- Spouses: Lynda Price (m. 1964, divorced) Diana Kirkwood (m. 1979, divorced)
- Children: 3

Christopher Winton Beeny (7 July 1941 – 3 January 2020) was an English actor and dancer. He had a career as a child actor, but was best known for his work as the footman Edward Barnes on the 1970s television series Upstairs, Downstairs, as Billy Henshaw in the sitcom In Loving Memory (Yorkshire Television), and as the incompetent debt collector and golfer Morton Beamish in Last of the Summer Wine.

== Early life ==
Beeny was born in London. He moved to Bristol with his family as a young child, spent several years at the Arts Educational School, and later attended the Royal Academy of Dramatic Art. As a child, Beeny began his career at the age of six when he danced for the Ballet Rambert.

Beeny's first screen role was in the film The Long Memory (1953). It starred John Mills and featured Thora Hird, Beeny's future co-star in In Loving Memory and Last of the Summer Wine.

== Career ==
=== Television ===
Beeny played Lenny Grove in the first British television soap, the BBC TV series The Grove Family, which was shown on Fridays from 1954 until 1957, (and named after the BBC Studios of Lime Grove Studios), as well as the feature film of the same, called It's a Great Day.

He gained notice when he appeared in the highly successful period drama Upstairs, Downstairs (1971–75) as the footman Edward Barnes. He appeared as Geoffrey in the single mother sitcom Miss Jones and Son (1977–78), as Tony in the remake of The Rag Trade (1977–78) and co-starring (as Billy Henshaw) with Thora Hird in a further sitcom, In Loving Memory.

In 2001 he made a guest appearance in Last of the Summer Wine, something which he repeated numerous times until 2009 when he joined the cast as a regular character. He appeared originally as the character Herman Teasdale, who later became Morton Beamish.

In 2006, he played a cameo role in Emmerdale. Coincidentally, he played the cousin of the character Noreen Bell, who had been played by his Upstairs, Downstairs colleague Jenny Tomasin. Beeny also played cameo roles in BBC TV's Sense & Sensibility and ITV's series Honest.

=== Theatre ===
Beeny's theatre appearances included Stop the World – I Want to Get Off; The Long The Short And The Tall; Scapino; How the Other Half Loves; Night Must Fall; Oliver!; Who Saw Him Die; The Unexpected Guest; Boeing, Boeing; Move Over, Mrs. Markham; Bedroom Farce; Run For Your Wife; Rough Crossing; Present Laughter; Brief Encounter; Caught In The Net; Crazy For You; Ten Times Table, and Lark Rise to Candleford.

Beeny also toured in the play There's No Place Like a Home with Gorden Kaye, and in 2011 toured in Five Blue Haired Ladies Sitting On A Park Bench. He appeared in pantomime at the Assembly Hall, Tunbridge Wells in late 2011, early 2012.

Beeny's son, James, formed the band Virgin Soldiers in 2009 and co-wrote a production that commemorates the 100th Anniversary of WWI. The production, The Dreamers, premiered at the Assembly Hall Theatre Tunbridge Wells in October 2014, and reached the West End in the summer of 2015. Beeny played the role of The Storyteller in the production.

== Personal life and death ==
Beeny had two children – a daughter, Johanne and a son, Richard – from his first marriage, and a son, James, from his second marriage to singer Diana Kirkwood, who performed on the BBC's Pebble Mill at One in the 1970s and 1980s.

He died at his home in Kent on 3 January 2020, aged 78.

== Filmography ==
=== Film ===
Year	Title	Role	Notes
1953	The Long Memory	Mickey	
1953	The Kidnappers	Jan Hooft Jr.	
1954	Child's Play	Horatio Flynn	
1955	Man of the Moment	Boy	Uncredited
1955	It's a Great Day	Lennie Grove	
1960	A French Mistress	Stephenson	
1963	Doctor in Distress	Medical Student	Uncredited
1963	Bitter Harvest	Youth in Shopping Centre	Uncredited
1984	Pop Pirates	Crawford	

=== Television ===
Year	Title	Role	Notes
1953	The Queen's Admiral	Pepito	TV film
1954-1957	The Grove Family	Lennie Grove	Series regular
1960	Probation Officer	Johnny	1 episode
1960-1961	Emergency Ward 10	Nicholas Rhys	2 episodes
1961	Spycatcher	Batman	Episode: "Logic and Lives"
1961	ITV Television Playhouse	Chris	Episode: "Different Drum"
1961	Yorky	Bobbie	Episode: "The Actress"
1962	Dixon of Dock Green	Jonty	Episode: "A Path Through the Jungle"
1962	BBC Sunday-Night Play	Chad	Episode: "Undercover Cat"
1962	Outbreak of Murder	Ken Mitchell	Series regular
1963	The Plane Makers	Maurice Frame	2 episodes
1963	ITV Play of the Week	Monte Marsh	Episode: "For King and Country #1: Out There"
1963	Taxi!	'Taff' Evans	Episode: "A Long Way to Go"
1970	Softly, Softly: Task Force	Daley	Episode: "Sunday, Sweet Sunday"
1971	The Rivals of Sherlock Holmes	Sparks	Episode: "The Affair of the Avalanche Bicycle & Tyre Co. Ltd."
1971-1975	Upstairs, Downstairs	Edward Barnes	Series regular
1972	The Regiment	Corporal Hobbert	Episode: "A Gentleman's War"
1973	Armchair Theatre	Lance Corporal	Episode: "The Square of Three"
1974	Crown Matrimonial	John, the Page	TV film
1975	The Sweeney	Photographer	Episode: "Night Out"
1975	My Old Man	Darts captain	1 episode
1976	Whodunnit?	Goodwin	Episode: "The Final Verdict"
1977-1978	Miss Jones and Son	Geoffrey	Series regular
1977-1978	The Rag Trade	Tony	Series regular
1979-1986	In Loving Memory	Billy Henshaw	Series regular
2006	Emmerdale	Gilbert Duff	1 episode
2008	Sense and Sensibility	Doctor	1 episode
2008	Honest	Wilson	1 episode
2008-2010	Last of the Summer Wine	Morton Beamish	Series regular
