= Edward Evans (actor) =

English actor (1914–2001)

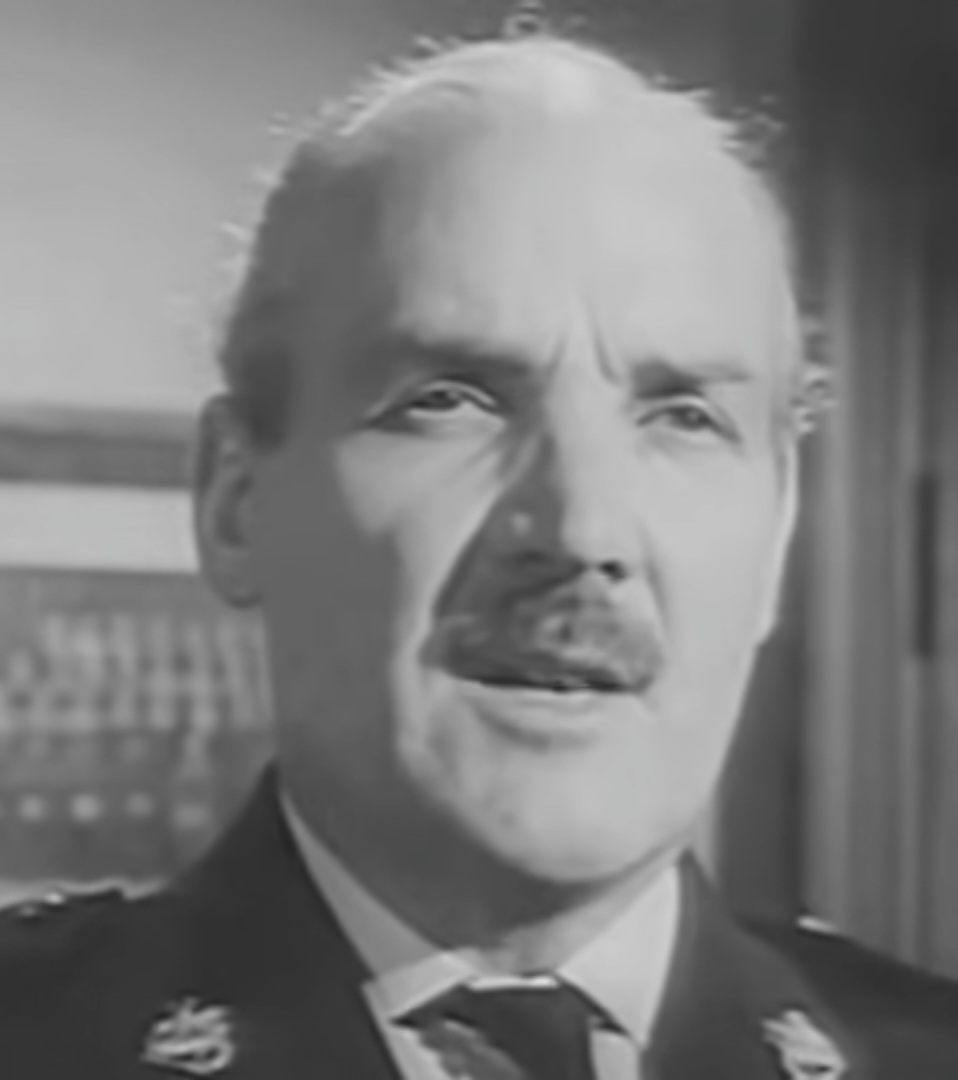
- Evans in an episode of One Step Beyond (1960)
- Born: Albert Edward Walker Evans; 4 June 1914; Putney, London
- Died: 20 December 2001 (aged 87); Longsdon, Staffordshire, England
- Spouse: Pauline Sherrey (m. 1939; died 1980)
- Children: 2 daughters

Albert Edward Walker Evans (4 June 1914 – 20 December 2001) was an English film and television actor.

During the Second World War, he served with the British Army in North Africa and Italy, attaining the rank of Captain.

Evans featured as Bob Grove in the 1950s soap opera The Grove Family and played the role of Lionel Petty in Coronation Street during 1965–66.

He also appeared in episodes of Dixon of Dock Green, The Saint, Doctor Who, Z-Cars and Dad's Army.

== Selected filmography ==
- London Belongs to Me (1948) – Detective Sergeant Taylor
- The Small Voice (1948) – Police Inspector
- The Case of Charles Peace (1949) – Police Sergeant (uncredited)
- Mr. Denning Drives North (1952) – Second Patrolman
- Secret People (1952) – Plain Clothes Man
- 13 East Street (1952) – Van Driver (uncredited)
- I Believe in You (1952) – Clerk of the Court (uncredited)
- Hindle Wakes (1952) – Chauffeur
- Cosh Boy (1953) – Sgt. Woods
- Time Bomb (1953) – Policeman at Station (uncredited)
- The Yellow Balloon (1953) – PC Patterson (uncredited)
- Appointment in London (1953) – A.C. Bridges (uncredited)
- Deadly Nightshade (1953) – Publican (uncredited)
- Grand National Night (1953) – Garage Attendant
- Turn the Key Softly (1953) – Commissionaire (uncredited)
- Valley of Song (1953) – Davies
- Escape by Night (1953) – Publican (uncredited)
- The Angel Who Pawned Her Harp (1954) – Sergeant Lane
- Man of the Moment (1955) – Bob Grove (uncredited)
- It's a Great Day (1955) – Bob Grove
- The Man Upstairs (1958) – Fire Brigade Officer
- The Bridal Path (1959) – Innkeeper
- The Trials of Oscar Wilde (1960) – Sydney
- Reach for Glory (1962)
- Two and Two Make Six (1962) – Mack
- Blind Corner (1963) – Chauffeur
- The Human Jungle
- Two a Penny (1967) – Jenkins
- Till Death Us Do Part (1969) – Jim (shopkeeper)
- Vendetta for the Saint (1969) – The Bank Manager
- One More Time (1970) – Gordon
- 10 Rillington Place (1971) – Police: Det. Inspector
- Sunday Bloody Sunday (1971) – Husband at Hospital
- Tales from the Crypt (1972) – Constable Ramsey (segment 3 "Poetic Justice")
- Out of Season (1975) – Charlie
- Lifeforce (1985) – Doctor
