= Ruth Dunning =

Welsh actress (1909–1983)

- Born: Mary Ruth Dunning; 17 May 1909; Prestatyn, North Wales, UK
- Died: 27 February 1983 (aged 73); London, England, UK
- Occupation: Actress
- Spouse: Jack Allen

Ruth Dunning (17 May 1909 – 27 February 1983), born Mary Ruth Dunning, was a Welsh actress of stage, television, and film. Although her year of birth was long given as 1911, her birth was registered in Holywell in 1909.

== Early life ==
Mary Ruth Dunning was born in Prestatyn, Denbighshire, in 1909.

== Career ==
=== Stage ===
As a young actress, Dunning was a member of an amateur theatre company in Altrincham. In 1934, she took over a part from Wendy Hiller in Love on the Dole, at the Garrick Theatre in London. Other stage appearances for Dunning included Val Gielgud's Punch and Judy (1937), A. A. Milne's Gentleman Unknown (1938), Ted Willis' The Eyes of Youth (1959), and Willis' adaptation of Gorky's Mother (1961).

=== Film and television ===
Dunning found fame in the role of Gladys Grove in BBC Television's The Grove Family (1954–1957), also portraying that character in the 1955 film It's a Great Day. In 1956, she appeared in a television commercial for Persil laundry detergent, on the first night of Granada Television's broadcasts in the north of England. In 1962 she was awarded the British Academy Television Award for Best Actress for her work on Armchair Theatre.

Other screen roles played by Dunning included Leonie in Intimate Relations (1953), Auntie B. in Urge to Kill (1960), Mrs. Mitchell in Hoffman (1970), Betty Atherton in The Sextet (1972), Agnes Henderson in The House in Nightmare Park (1973), Miss Minchin in A Little Princess (1973), Mildred Finch in An Unofficial Rose (1974–1975), Lesley Whittle's mother in The Black Panther (1977), and Mrs. Crabtree in Children of the Stones (1977).

== Personal life ==
Ruth Dunning was married to actor Jack Allen. She died in 1983, aged 73, in London.

The Ruth Dunning and Jack Allen Collection at the University of Bristol holds some of her papers, including contracts, scripts, and photographs.

== Partial filmography ==
- Save a Little Sunshine (1938) - Miss Dickson
- The Woman in the Hall (1947) - Shirley Dennison
- Intimate Relations (1953) - Leonie
- The Weak and the Wicked (1954) - Prison Matron
- Man of the Moment (1955) - Gladys Grove (uncredited)
- It's a Great Day (1955) - Gladys Grove
- Urge to Kill (1960) - Auntie B
- And Women Shall Weep (1960) - Mrs. Lumsden
- Dangerous Afternoon (1961) - Miss Letty Frost
- The Three Lives of Thomasina (1963) - Mother Stirling
- Undermind (1965) ( episode: "Waves of Sound") - Dr. Margaret Whittaker
- Hoffman (1970) - Mrs. Mitchell
- The House in Nightmare Park (1973) - Agnes Henderson
- The Black Panther (1977) - Lesley's Mother
