= Siân Thomas =

British actress (born 1953)

- Born: 20 September 1953 (age 72); Stratford-upon-Avon, England, United Kingdom
- Education: Royal Central School of Speech and Drama
- Occupation: Actor
- Known for: Playing Lady Macbeth, audiobooks, BBC's Merlin

Siân Thomas (born 20 September 1953) is a British actress who is known both for her work on stage and for her television and film appearances such as Harry Potter and the Order of the Phoenix in which she played Amelia Bones. Her voice is known to listeners both for her poetry readings on Radio 3 and for her audiobooks.

== Career ==
Thomas was born in Stratford-upon-Avon, England. She trained at the Central School of Speech and Drama. She played a prominent role in 1993 TV film Wide-Eyed and Legless, known as The Wedding Gift outside of the UK. Based on a true story, the drama tells of the author Deric Longden's (played by Jim Broadbent) final years of marriage to his first wife Diana (Julie Walters) in the early 1980s and her fight against an illness which doctors then did not understand, later believed to be a form of chronic fatigue syndrome or myalgic encephalomyelitis. The film also featured Thora Hird as Deric Longden's mother Annie. Thomas played partially-sighted Aileen Armitage, the novelist who would become Longden's second wife in 1990.

In 2002 she appeared in London's West End theatre production Up for Grabs with Madonna. The critic Michael Billington commented that "Madonna is not positively bad: just technically awkward. But, fortunately, she is buttressed by strong supporting players. Sian Thomas, who can get a laugh simply through the flick of an eyelid, is superb as a Courtauld-trained consultant longing to get her revenge on the corporate world."

In 2004, Thomas played the leading role of Lady Macbeth in the Royal Shakespeare Company's production of Macbeth at Stratford-on-Avon. Billington wrote that "Sian Thomas was also born to play Lady Macbeth. She has the right mixture of attack, sexiness and emotional drive", adding that she gave Shakespeare's sometimes complex lines exactly the right stress to bring out the subtle antitheses. He noted, too, that she brought out the character's steadily growing "tactical and emotional isolation".

In the musical Spring Awakening in London in 2009, she and Richard Cordery played "all the adult roles with cartoon-like aplomb".

In 2010, Thomas played the leading role of the queen in the National Theatre Wales's production of Aeschylus's The Persians, described by The Guardian as "a tremendous performance as the queen, a woman of fiery splendour reduced to ululating agony as the disasters mount and she cries 'this is the peak of my misery'."

In 2011, she played the leading lady Martha in the Northern Stage and Sheffield theatres co-production of Edward Albee's play Who's Afraid of Virginia Woolf?. The critic Clare Brennan commented that she and the leading man Jasper Britton "seize the parts for their own", as Thomas's Martha "part praying mantis, part puppet, jerks around the stage as if impelled by forces trying to rip free from her control – despair, grief and rage."

From 2012 she appeared as Atorloppe in the BBC's Merlin series.

Thomas has read poetry for the BBC Radio 3 programme Words and Music. She has also been employed on several audiobooks including Allison Pearson's I Think I Love You and Marina Lewycka's A Short History of Tractors in Ukrainian.

== Family ==
Thomas spent part of her childhood living in Canada. She is the sister of the actress Sara Mair-Thomas. Her partner, until his death in September 2025, was the poet Tony Harrison.

== Partial filmography ==
- Prick Up Your Ears (1987) - Marilyn Orton
- Erik the Viking (1989) - Thorhild the Sarcastic
- Vanity Fair (2004) - Lady Darlington
- Perfume: The Story of a Murderer (2006) - Madame Gaillard
- The Ruby in the Smoke (2006) - Mrs Rees
- Harry Potter and the Order of the Phoenix (2007) - Amelia Bones
- War Machine (2017) - Secretary of State Edith May
- Finding Your Feet (2018) - Lilly
