= Nan Braunton =

British actress (1895–1978)

Nan Braunton as Cissy Godfrey in Dad's Army

Minnie Malinda "Nan" Braunton (4 April 1895 – 27 March 1978) was a British actress who had a prolific stage career during the 1930s and 1940s but who is best remembered for playing Cissy Godfrey in the BBC comedy Dad's Army.

Braunton was born in Cardiff in 1895, the daughter of Sarah and James Braunton, a carriage builder. In her youth she was the nanny to Jack, Barry and Roger Livesey who called her 'Nan' and who as adults persuaded her to try acting.

== Stage work ==
By 1922 she was playing Lady Lerode in the stage play John Glayde's Honour at the Grand Theatre in Derby, and also appeared in Dracula at the Theatre Royal, Lincoln (1926). In 1929 she toured the United States in a theatrical company as an actress. She was Mrs Smith in Suspect, played the 101-year-old Adelaide Whiteoak in Whiteoaks at the Theatre Royal, Nottingham (1939), appeared in No Orchids for Miss Blandish (1943), firstly in the West End and then on tour, played Jessica in Michael and Roland Pertwee's The Paragon at the Fortune Theatre (1948) and appeared in The Boy David with the Birmingham Repertory Theatre (1953).

== Film and television ==
Braunton made her film début in 1953 in Will Any Gentleman...?. She also appeared as Miss Jones in the film It's a Great Day (1955), which was a spin-off from the early television soap opera The Grove Family (1955–57) and in which she played the same role.

Her other television appearances included Miss Dobson in Quatermass and the Pit (1958), Fräulein Rottenmeier in Heidi (1959), in the 'Figure of Fun' episode of the BBC's Sunday Night Theatre (1959), Second Lady in Hotel Imperial (1960), Miss Sedgebeer in Yorky (1960), Miss Osborne in Harpers West One (1962), Mrs. Mortimer in Emergency – Ward 10 (1962), Second Matron in Armchair Theatre (1963), Mrs. Prebble in The Wednesday Thriller (1965), Bridge player in The Wednesday Play (1968), Mrs. Parteridge and Florence Gill in Detective (1964 and 1968), Mrs. Love Sr. in Comedy Playhouse (1969), Miss Blake in Strange Report (1969), Cissy Godfrey in Dad's Army (1969-1971), various roles in Dixon of Dock Green (1955–69), and Old Lady in Six Dates with Barker (1971).

She married Robert Bevens in 1947 in London. Nan Braunton died in 1978 in Denville Hall, the retirement home for actors in London.
