= Urge to Kill (film) =

1960 British film by Vernon Sewell

- Original Australian daybill poster
- Directed by: Vernon Sewell
- Written by: James Eastwood; Gerald Savory (story)
- Produced by: Jack Greenwood
- Starring: Patrick Barr; Ruth Dunning
- Cinematography: John Wiles
- Edited by: Geoffrey Muller
- Music by: Trevor Duncan
- Distributed by: Anglo-Amalgamated
- Release date: March 1960
- Running time: 59 minutes
- Country: United Kingdom
- Language: English

Urge to Kill is a 1960 British second feature serial killer film directed by Vernon Sewell and starring Patrick Barr, Ruth Dunning and Terence Knapp. The screenplay was by James Eastwood based on the 1942 novel Hughie Roddis and 1944 play Hand in Glove, both by Gerald Savory.

== Plot ==
While making her way home from the cinema one night in a particularly grey and drab town, a young woman is murdered in an unusually brutal and sadistic manner. Local suspicion immediately falls on Hughie, a strangely behaved and not very bright local youth who has a habit of wandering aimlessly around the town at all hours randomly collecting stray bits and pieces, with a particular fondness for broken glass – which unfortunately for Hughie happens to have been one of the weapons used in the fatal attack.

Hughie lives in the lodging house run by his aunt, along with a selection of boarders including a kindly elderly gent with a penchant for Bible-bashing and a smooth-talking ladies' man. Hughie is questioned by the police, but Superintendent Allen releases him as there is no firm evidence against him. A few days later another girl is killed in the town, and the locals make up their minds that Hughie is responsible and launch a witch-hunt against him. Believing the police are failing to do their job properly, they start issuing death threats against him after gathering in the pub to discuss the case, and the front window of the lodging house is put through by a large rock. Again, Allen's instincts tell him that Hughie is basically a harmless if odd soul, and is not responsible for the killings.

Allen starts to look more closely at other individuals connected to Hughie, in the belief that somebody is going out of their way to set him up. While the townsfolk continue their vendetta, Allen quietly observes and finds his attention focussed on a likely suspect. He shadows the individual as he walks the streets of the town one night and catches the guilty party almost in the act, narrowly saving another young woman from a murderous attack.

== Cast ==
- Patrick Barr as Superintendent Allen
- Ruth Dunning as Auntie B.
- Terence Knapp as Hughie
- Howard Pays as Charles Ramskill
- Anna Turner as Lily Willis
- Christopher Trace as Sgt. Grey
- Wilfrid Brambell as Mr. Forsythe
- Margaret St. Barbe West as Mrs. Willis
- Yvonne Buckingham as Gwen
- Rita Webb as charwoman
- Laura Thurlow as Jenny
- Ken Midwood as Sergeant Brigs
- Brian O'Higgins as Curly Latham
- Margaret McGrath as Alice
- David Lander as Harris
- David Browning as uniformed inspector

== Critical reception ==
The Monthly Film Bulletin wrote: "A potentially horrific theme is treated with little sensationalism. In fact both script and direction often have an air of the respectable village dramatic society about them. Howard Pays' sinister lines are heavily stressed for all to recognise them and most of the action takes place in one living-room where people are always popping in and out. The dialogue tends to repeat the obvious, the motivation for the second crime is ambiguous, and the errors that betray the killer are unbelievably blatant and inconsistent with his earlier cunning. Terence Knapp gives a sympathetic and convincing performance in the better constructed part of Hughie, the simpleton."

Kine Weekly wrote: "The script eschews subtlety, but cast and director play upturned aces and court cards skilfully and temper suspense with human interest. ...Howard Pays registers as the schizophrenic Ramskill; Terence Knapp excrcises restraint as the jibbering, though harmless, Hughie; Ruth Dunning has her moments as Auntie B; and Patrick Barr is most professional as Allen. There is little comedy relief, but the domestic asides are quite touching, and the finale Is tense."
