= Simpkin (surname) =

Simpkin is a surname. Notable people with the surname include:

- Anne Simpkin (born 1969), British tennis player
- Chris Simpkin (born 1944), British footballer
- George Simpkin (1943–2020), New Zealand rugby coach
- Jake Simpkin (born 2001), Australian rugby player
- Jonathan Simpkin (born 1987), Australian footballer
- Jy Simpkin (born 1998), Australian footballer
- Luke Simpkin (born 1979), British boxer
- Mark Simpkin (born 1972), English television presenter and businessman
- Richard Simpkin (1921–1986), British Army officer
- Tom Simpkin (born 1990), Australian footballer

== See also ==
- Simpkin (disambiguation)
