= The Tailor of Gloucester (film) =

- Screenplay by: John Michael Phillips
- Story by: Beatrix Potter
- Directed by: John Michael Phillips
- Starring: Ian Holm; Thora Hird; Barrie Ingham; Jude Law; Benjamin Luxon
- Music by: Douglas Young
- Country of origin: United Kingdom
- Original language: English

Production
- Producer: Timothy Woodford
- Running time: 45 minutes
- Production company: Dreamscape Co./Thames Television

Original release
- Release: 28 December 1989

The Tailor of Gloucester is a television Christmas special first broadcast on 28 December 1989 on ITV. It is based on the children's story by Beatrix Potter.

== Plot ==
The film tells the story of a poor tailor, his cat, and the mice that live in his shop. He has many scraps of cloth and ribbons left over that are too small for any practical use. The mice take these and make fine clothes for themselves.

The tailor sends his cat Simpkin to buy food and a twist of cherry-coloured silk for a coat the mayor has commissioned for his wedding, which will take place on Christmas morning.

While the cat is gone, the tailor frees the mice from teacups where Simpkin has imprisoned them. When Simpkin returns and finds his mice gone, he hides the twist in anger.

When the tailor falls ill, the mice save the day by completing the coat. (One buttonhole remains incomplete because the mice run out of twist).

== Cast ==
- Ian Holm as The Tailor of Gloucester
- Thora Hird as The Mayor's Housekeeper
- Jude Law as the Mayor's Stableboy
- Barry Ingham as the Mayor
- Other performers: Benjamin Luxon, Francois Testory
