= The Tailor of Gloucester =

1902 children's book by Beatrix Potter

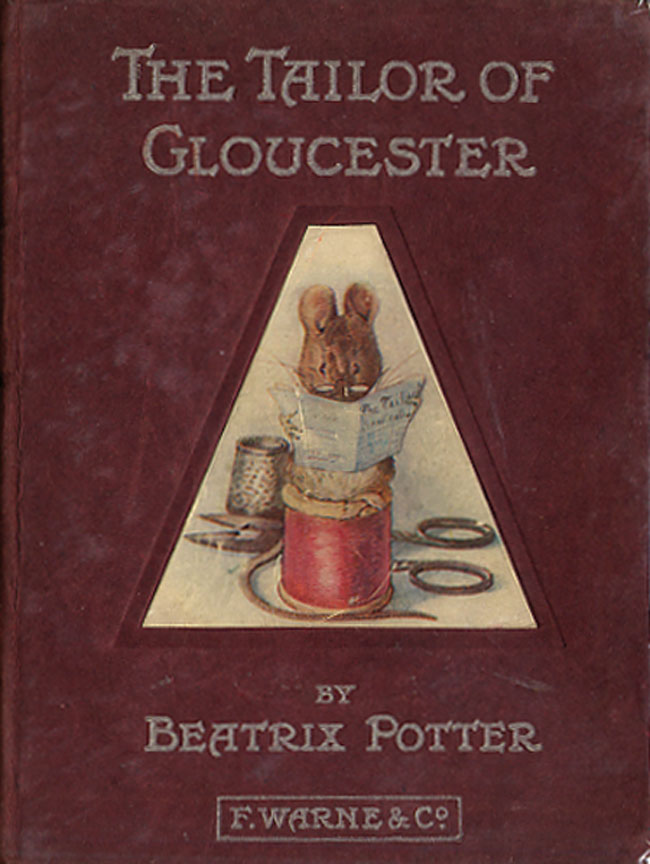
- First edition cover
- Author: Beatrix Potter
- Illustrator: Beatrix Potter
- Language: English
- Genre: Children's literature
- Publisher: Frederick Warne & Co.
- Publication date: October 1903
- Publication place: England, United Kingdom
- Media type: Print (hardcover) KO
- OCLC: 884366
- Preceded by: The Tale of Squirrel Nutkin
- Followed by: The Tale of Benjamin Bunny
- Text: The Tailor of Gloucester at Wikisource

The Tailor of Gloucester is a Christmas children's book written and illustrated by Beatrix Potter, privately printed by the author in 1902, and published in a trade edition by Frederick Warne & Co. in October 1903. The story is about a tailor whose work on a waistcoat is finished by the grateful mice he rescues from his cat and was based on a real-world incident involving a tailor and his assistants. For years, Potter declared that of all her books it was her personal favourite.

== Plot ==
An elderly, impoverished tailor is commissioned by the Mayor of Gloucester to make a finely embroidered coat for his wedding on Christmas Day. After carefully cutting out all the pieces, he realizes he needs one more skein of cherry-coloured twist (loose yarn) for the button holes.

That evening, he asks his cat Simpkin to take their last penny and go buy some twist. While he's gone, the tailor discovers the cat has trapped some mice under teacups and frees them. Simpkin returns, only to find his dinner has disappeared, and angrily hides the twist as revenge. Unsure how he'll finish the coat with no more twist, the tailor goes to bed dejected.

That night, the tailor falls ill and is stuck in bed for days, unable to work. By Christmas Eve the coat has still not been finished. During the night the mice sneak into the tailor's workshop and repay him by sewing together the coat. Seeing their kindness, Simpkin feels guilty and gives his master back the twist.

The tailor wakes up on Christmas morning and finds the coat is ready, apart from the last button hole. Pinned to it is a scrap of paper that says, in the tiniest writing: "No more twist."

== Composition ==
In the summer of 1901, Potter was working on The Tale of Squirrel Nutkin, but took time to develop a tale about a poor tailor she heard in the Gloucestershire home of her cousin Caroline Hutton probably in 1897. The tale was finished by Christmas 1901, and given as a Christmas present to ten-year-old Freda Moore, the daughter of her former governess.

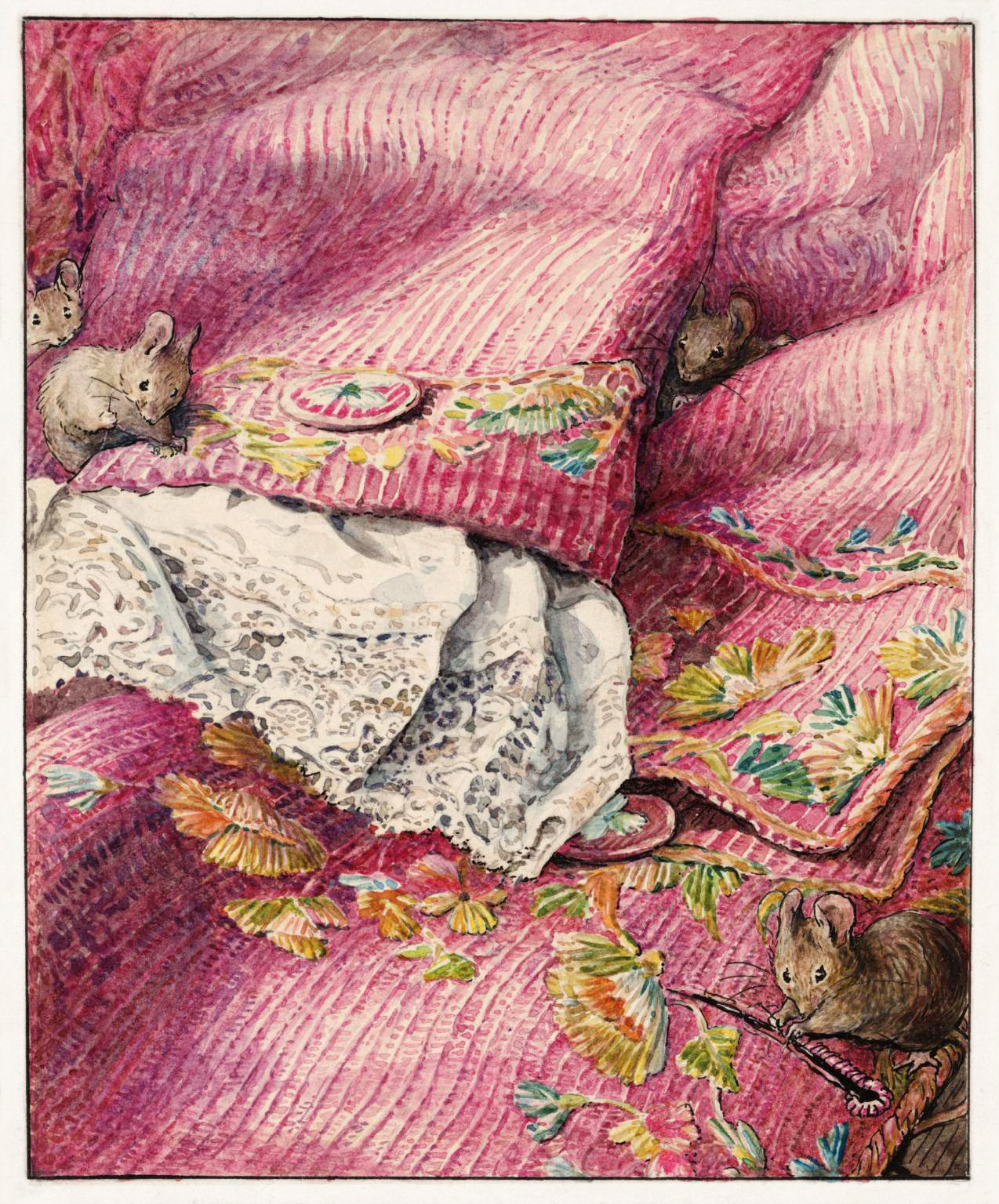
Potter visited a museum to refine her illustrations of eighteenth century dress.

The tale was based on a real world incident involving John Prichard (1877–1934), a Gloucester tailor commissioned to make a suit for the new mayor. He returned to his shop on a Monday morning to find the suit completed except for one buttonhole. A note attached read, "No more twist". His assistants had finished the coat in the night, but Prichard encouraged a fiction that fairies had done the work and the incident became a local legend. Although Prichard was a contemporary of Potter's (he was about eleven years her junior and in his twenties when the incident took place), Potter's tailor is shown as "a little old man in spectacles, with a pinched face, old crooked fingers," and the action of The Tailor of Gloucester takes place in the 18th century.

Potter sketched the Gloucester street where the tailor's shop stood as well as cottage interiors, crockery, and furniture. The son of Hutton's coachman posed as a model for the tailor. In Chelsea, Potter was allowed to sketch the interior of a tailor's shop to whose proprietor she would later send a copy. She visited the costume department at the South Kensington Museum to refine her illustrations of 18th century dress.

Potter later borrowed Freda Moore's gift copy, revised the work, and privately printed the tale in December 1902. She marketed the book among family and friends and sent a copy to her publisher who made numerous cuts in both text and illustrations for the trade edition, chiefly among the tale's many nursery rhymes.

== Publication history ==
Squirrel Nutkin was published in August 1903 and Tailor in October 1903. Both were published in deluxe editions bound in a flowered chintz of scattered pansies the author selected. The familiar illustrated endpapers of Potter characters in a chain bordering the edges of the page were introduced in both books against Potter's better judgement. However, Warne was delighted with the commercial potential of the endpapers because new characters hinting at future titles could be worked into the design at any time.

== Reception ==
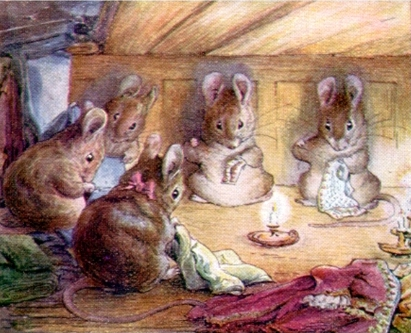
The mice sewing

Potter gave a copy of the book to her Chelsea tailor who, in turn, displayed it to a representative of the trade journal, The Tailor & Cutter. The journal's review appeared on Christmas Eve 1903:

[...] we think it is by far the prettiest story connected with tailoring we have ever read, and as it is full of that spirit of Peace on Earth, Goodwill to Men, we are not ashamed to confess that it brought the moisture to our eyes, as well as the smile to our face. It is got up in choicest style and illustrated by twenty-seven of the prettiest pictures it is possible to imagine.

== Adaptations ==
In 1988, Rabbit Ears Productions produced a storyteller version with narration by Meryl Streep, drawings by David Jorgensen and music by The Chieftains.

Ian Holm played the tailor in a live-action TV adaptation in 1989 which included Thora Hird and Jude Law in an early part as the Mayor's stableboy.

In 1993, the tale was adapted to animation for the BBC anthology series, The World of Peter Rabbit and Friends. Derek Griffiths was the voice of Simpkin, with Ian Holm reprising his role as the tailor. The episode was dedicated to Dianne Jackson who died of cancer on New Year's Eve 1992.

== In popular culture ==
Since the early 1970s, Hertford College, Oxford has kept a resident college cat called Simpkin, named after the character from The Tailor of Gloucester. This tradition was started by the former college principal Geoffrey Warnock.

The city of Gloucester has a specific shop in the old centre of the city dedicated to the story called ‘The Tailor of Gloucester Museum and Shop’. The shop sells various books and souvenirs of Beatrix Potter’s books, but there is also a replica waistcoat made by local seamstresses of Gloucester. The shop also has a replica room in the form of The Tailor of Gloucester’s living room in his cottage. It is a popular location for fans of Beatrix Potter, especially fans of the story.

== Works cited ==
- Hallinan, Camilla (2002), The Ultimate Peter Rabbit, London: Dorling Kindersley, ISBN 978-0-7513-3746-4
- Lear, Linda (2007), Beatrix Potter: A Life in Nature, New York: St. Martin's Griffin, ISBN 978-0-312-37796-0
- Taylor, Susan; Whalley, Joyce Irene; Hobbs, Anne Stevenson; Battrick, Elizabeth M. (1987), Beatrix Potter 1866–1943: The Artist and Her World, London: F. Warne & Co. and The National Trust, ISBN 0-7232-3561-9
