= Veronica Doran =

British character actress (born 1948)

- Born: 17 May 1948 (age 78); Carlisle, Cumberland, England
- Occupation: Actress
- Years active: 1964–present

Veronica Doran (born 17 May 1948) is a British character actress who remains best known for her 18-month stint as Marion Willis in the ITV soap opera, Coronation Street. She appeared in the series from 1982 to 1983.

== Early life ==
Veronica Doran was born on 17 May 1948 in Carlisle, Cumberland, but was brought up in Blackpool, Lancashire. She was educated at St. Margaret Mary's School and St. Patrick's School in Carlisle before attending the Sacred Heart School in Blackpool. As a child she trained as a dancer and appeared with the Blackpool Tower Children's Ballet Company. Her career as an actress began as a voluntary helper with a small Lancashire repertory company.

== Career ==
In June 1971 Doran played the small part of a worker at the Mark Brittain Warehouse named Carol in the long-running ITV soap opera, Coronation Street. Over ten years later she returned to this programme and performed in her best known role, that of flower shop assistant Marion Yeats. She played this part from February 1982 to December 1983.

Prior to this role Doran worked steadily at a string of parts in various television shows, beginning with a tiny role in the drama Crossroads. Through the '70s she played mostly in single-episodes rather than as returning characters, and gained roles in such well-known shows as Upstairs, Downstairs, Man About The House, Public Eye and The Pallisers. In 1981 Doran scored a regular role in the comedy Funny Man but the programme lasted only one season.

After her Coronation Street portrayal ended, Doran's television work became sparse. She appeared three times in In Loving Memory, a comedy about undertakers. Her most recent television role came in 2000 in an episode of the crime drama City Central. She has also worked on stage, her latest appearances being in Once a Catholic as Mother Thomas Aquinas, Billy Liar as Barbara, Seven Brides for Seven Brothers as Mrs. Perkins, The Wizard of Oz as the Wicked Witch and Blithe Spirit as Edith.

Doran has acted in several films including For the Love of Ada, Screamtime, The Haunted House of Horror, and Adventures of a Private Eye.

== Personal life ==
Doran trained as a telephone receptionist and works for the charity the King's Fund, an organisation set up by King Edward VII to improve the British health system. When not employed in acting, Veronica donates her spare time to the organisation.

== Filmography ==
=== Films ===
- The Haunted House of Horror (1969) as Madge
- For the Love of Ada (1972) as Carol
- The Sex Thief (1973) as Meter Attendant
- Escort Girls (1975) as Vicky
- It Could Happen to You (1975) as Queen
- Adventures of a Private Eye (1977) as Maud
- Screamtime (1983) as Miss Burns

=== Television ===
Year	Television	Role
2000	City Central	Jackie Tremlett
1991	The Brittas Empire	Mrs. Phillips
1989	Precious Bane	Mrs. Callard
1986	Farrington of the F.O.	Tourist
1981	Funny Man	Freda
1980	Lady Killers	Lucy Ostler
1980–1986	In Loving Memory	Cynthia
1981–1983	Coronation Street	Marion Willis
