= There's No Place Like a Home =

There's No Place Like A Home is a comedy play by Paul Elliott which tells the story of the residents of Stollberg Hall Retirement Home for Theatrical Performers. When the home is threatened with closure, they do what any self-respecting bunch of former entertainers would do. They devise a plan to save the home from closure, which is so theatrical and entertaining only they could pull it off.

These older retired residents decide to kidnap a celebrity and hold them to ransom, using the money from this to save the grand house (and its even grander residents). They choose Jeffrey Archer as their victim, but their plan goes very wrong.

The play toured in autumn 2006 and autumn 2007, with Gorden Kaye, Ken Morley, Don Maclean, Christopher Beeny, Peter Byrne, Brian Cant, Sue Hodge, Jan Hunt, Jody Crosier, Mike Edmonds, Brian Godfrey, and Emily Trebicki.

Reviews were mostly unenthusiastic to mediocre, but the Daily Telegraph was positive.
