= It's a Great Day =

1955 film by John Warrington

- Film poster
- Directed by: John Warrington
- Screenplay by: Roland Pertwee; Michael Pertwee
- Produced by: Victor Lyndon
- Starring: Ruth Dunning; Edward Evans; Sid James
- Cinematography: Cedric Williams
- Music by: Eric Spear
- Production company: Grove Films
- Release date: 1955
- Running time: 71 minutes
- Country: United Kingdom
- Language: English

It's a Great Day is a 1955 British comedy film directed by John Warrington and starring Ruth Dunning, Edward Evans and Sid James. It was written by Roland Pertwee and Michael Pertwee. It is a spin-off from the BBC TV soap The Grove Family.

== Plot ==
Local builder Bob Grove has some temperamental differences with his Council Manager leaving him without materials to finish a housing estate. His son Jack recruits the services of Harry Mason of dubious character, to help him get hold of the materials he needs. Things turn sour when Bob and Jack are suspected of stealing, leading to a police investigation. All this takes place around a planned Royal Visit to the new housing estate.

== Cast ==
- Ruth Dunning as Gladys Grove
- Edward Evans as Bob Grove
- Sid James as Harry Mason
- Vera Day as Blondie
- Sheila Sweet as Pat Grove
- Peter Bryant as Jack Grove
- Nancy Roberts as Gran (Roberts played the same role in the TV series)
- Margaret Downs as Daphne Grove
- Christopher Beeny as Lennie Grove
- Victor Maddern as Charlie Mead
- John Stuart as Detective Inspector Marker
- Henry Oscar as surveyor
- Marjorie Rhodes as landlady
- Nan Braunton as Miss Jones

== Critical reception ==
In discussing the original TV show, the Radio Times praised "The excellent Ruth Dunning and Edward Evans," but "the acting honours, and the popularity stakes, were hijacked by formidable Nancy Roberts as Gran. This cheaply made feature version of the show, produced quickly and efficiently by Butcher's Films with the original cast, now looks like a perfect period artefact. The plot is wonderfully naive, casting doubt on upright Mr Grove's integrity, and the cast is studded with marvellous 1950s faces such as Sid James, Victor Maddern, Michael Balfour and Vera Day. It's a treat for nostalgists and those who cherish that period of postwar austerity, when such a cosy family unit was perceived as the ideal."

Kine Weekly wrote: "The picture, or rather chapter of incidents, has variety – there is bathroom slapstick, a fierce fight between Mead and Jack, the rescue of the Groves’s younger son from a scaffold and squabbles between the Groves’s daughter and her beau – and the titbits not only register on their own, but blend into a laughable mosaic."

In British Sound Films David Quinlan said: "Harmless comedy from a monumentally successful TV show; certainly there’s a lot going on."
