= Hallelujah! (TV series) =

British TV sitcom (1983–1984)

- Created by: Dick Sharples
- Starring: Thora Hird; Patsy Rowlands; Rosamund Greenwood; David Daker; Garfield Morgan; Geoffrey Bayldon; Michael Aldridge; Derek Benfield
- Country of origin: United Kingdom
- Original language: English
- No. of series: 2
- No. of episodes: 15

Production
- Producer: Yorkshire Television
- Running time: 25 minutes

Original release
- Network: ITV
- Release: 29 April 1983 – 21 December 1984

Hallelujah! is a British television sitcom produced by Yorkshire Television that aired on ITV from 29 April 1983 to 21 December 1984.

The series was set in a Salvation Army citadel in the fictional Yorkshire town of Brigthorpe during series 1 (and later in the fictional place of Blackwick in series 2). Captain Emily Ridley (Thora Hird) has been posted there, having been an active member of the Salvation Army for 42 years. Despite the town and residents being seemingly pleasant, Emily is determined to flush out sin from behind the net curtains. Assisting Emily is her niece Alice Meredith (Patsy Rowlands).

The programme was a further collaboration between Hird and the creator Dick Sharples, who worked together on the comedy series In Loving Memory between 1979 and 1986.

The series also featured guest appearances from the likes of Hird's Last of the Summer Wine co-star Michael Aldridge and television presenter Richard Whiteley.

== Plot ==
The show was set in the Salvation Army based in the fictional Yorkshire town of Brigthorpe during Series 1, and in the equally fictional Yorkshire place of Blackwick during Series 2. Thora Hird starred as Captain Emily Ridley, with Patsy Rowlands as her niece Alice Meredith and Rosamund Greenwood as Sister Dorothy Smith (who left after the first series and was later replaced by David Daker as Brother Benjamin in the second series).

== Cast ==
- Thora Hird as Captain Emily Ridley
- Walter Gotell as Lt. Colonel Henderson
- Patsy Rowlands as Alice Meredith
- Rosamund Greenwood as Sister Dorothy Smith (series 1)
- David Daker as Brother Benjamin (series 2)
- Geoffrey Bayldon as Mr Sedgewick
- Michael Aldridge as Brig Langton (series 1)
- Garfield Morgan as Brig Langton (series 2)
- Derek Benfield as Arthur Walton (series 1) and as Andrew Gibson (series 2)

== Episodes ==
=== Series 1 (1983) ===
No. overall	No. in series	Title	Original release date
1	1	"Retirement"	29 April 1983
2	2	"Repentance"	6 May 1983
3	3	"Counselling"	13 May 1983
4	4	"Poor Box"	20 May 1983
5	5	"Luncheon Club"	27 May 1983
6	6	"Mobile Canteen"	3 June 1983
7	7	"Struck Down"	10 June 1983

=== Series 2 (1984) ===
No. overall	No. in series	Title	Original release date
8	1	"Marching Orders"	2 November 1984
9	2	"Just a Song at Twilight"	9 November 1984
10	3	"Holy Deadlock"	16 November 1984
11	4	"The Snake Pit – Part 1"	23 November 1984
12	5	"The Snake Pit – Part 2"	30 November 1984
13	6	"Rock Bottom"	7 December 1984
14	7	"It Happened One Night"	14 December 1984

=== Christmas Special (1984) ===
No. overall	Title	Original release date
15	"A Goose For Mrs. Scratchitt"	21 December 1984

Only 15 episodes over two series were made though some sources claim that there were three series made. This is incorrect; there were only two series and one Christmas special shown between 1983 and 1984.

In 1985, it was reported that a continuation/sequel of the series was to be produced for BBC 2. This follow-on series ultimately never appeared; instead, Hird later that year signed up to play Edie Pegden, a character with a number of parallels to her Hallelujah! character Captain Emily Ridley, in Last of the Summer Wine, a role that was written especially for her by Roy Clarke when she became available.

== Location filming ==
The series was filmed mostly in and around both Yorkshire Television Studios and the Leeds area. Most notable filming location was Leeds General Infirmary, especially appearances by old run-down buildings around the Leeds-area at the time. Some scenes in the Christmas special were filmed in the Victorian street exhibition of the York Castle museum. The opening sequence was filmed outside the Garden Gate pub in Hunslet.

== Theme music ==
The theme music was performed by the James Shepherd Versatile Brass, conducted by Robert Hartley.

== Home media ==
DD Home Entertainment (now known as 'Simply Home Entertainment') released series 1 and 2 in 2008. They claimed that series two was complete at first, However, as the Christmas special was not included, they later dropped this claim (the artwork on the cover stayed the same however)

DVD	Year(s)	Release date
The Complete Series 1	1983	19 April 2010
The Complete Series 2	1984	5 July 2010
The Complete Series 1 & 2 and Christmas Special	1983–1984	8 November 2010

Hallelujah! has been released in Australia by Acorn Media Australia. It is a boxset with both series plus the Christmas special. It has been released as an all region DVD (PAL).

== Notes ==
1. Lewisohn, Mark. Radio Times Guide to British Comedy p. 292. ISBN 0-563-36977-9
