= Simpkin (cat) =

Resident cat at the University of Oxford

Simpkin is the name of the resident cat at Hertford College, Oxford. The college's tradition of keeping a mouser was started in the early 1970s by the former college principal Geoffrey Warnock. The college's cat is named Simpkin after a character in the children's book, The Tailor of Gloucester, by Beatrix Potter.

To date, Hertford College has had four college cats called Simpkin. The first three were black with white chest and feet, but the current one, Simpkin IV, is entirely black.

== Simpkin I (mouser from c.1971 – ?) ==
Simpkin I, originally named Blanca, was given to the daughter of Hertford College's then principal, Geoffrey Warnock, and arrived at the college as a kitten. Renamed Simpkin after the character in The Tailor of Gloucester, he gained public notoriety on one occasion by having to be rescued from a high roof at New College, Oxford by the local fire brigade.

== Simpkin II (1986 – 17 Dec 1999) ==
Simpkins (aka Simpkin II) was born in Oxford in 1986, and arrived at the college in that year. Noted for being a keen hunter, he is mentioned in the book College Cats of Oxford and Cambridge as stalking and then being forced to flee by an angry mallard drake.

Simpkins died on 17 December 1999, aged 14 years. He was succeeded very briefly by a white kitten called "Sir G", who was stolen soon after arriving on campus.

== Simpkin III (2000 – Aug 2016) ==
Simpkin III came to Hertford College in 2000, and served as mouser for 15 years. A notable event of his career was an occasion where he boarded a milk delivery van and was inadvertently carried to Winchester, over 50 miles away.

He died in August 2016 and his remains buried in Hertford College's OB Quad.

== Simpkin IV (2017 – ) ==
Simpkin IV, the incumbent mouser, was originally called Buddy, and was 4 or 5 years old when he joined the college. He was found as a stray in the Torbay region and, after various adventures, ended up at the nicest home of his life, the college, after Christmas 2017. He is known for incursions into the territory of Walter, the mouser of Exeter College, Oxford; in January 2022 he was formally banned from entry to Exeter's library.

Simpkin IV has his own Instagram page, operated on his behalf by the Hertford College JCR.
