= In Loving Memory (TV series) =

- Thora Hird and Christopher Beeny
- Created by: Dick Sharples
- Starring: Thora Hird; Christopher Beeny; Colin Farrell; Avis Bunnage; Sherrie Hewson; Rose Power; Joan Sims; Veronica Doran; Paul Luty
- Country of origin: United Kingdom
- Original language: English
- No. of series: 5
- No. of episodes: 37

Production
- Producer: Ronnie Baxter
- Running time: 25 minutes
- Production companies: Thames Television (pilot); Yorkshire Television

Original release
- Network: ITV
- Release: 4 November 1969
- Release: 21 May 1979 – 27 March 1986

In Loving Memory is a British period sitcom set in an undertakers business that starred Thora Hird and Christopher Beeny. A pilot with Marjorie Rhodes in the Thora Hird role was transmitted on 4 November 1969 by Thames Television, who rejected the idea before it was finally accepted by Yorkshire Television nearly 10 years later, where it ran for a further five series between 21 May 1979 and 27 March 1986.

== Plot ==
The year is 1929 and in the opening episode Jeremiah Unsworth (Freddie Jones), the proprietor of the undertakers, dies. This leaves his widow Ivy (Thora Hird) and gormless nephew Billy (Christopher Beeny) to take over the business. As might be expected, the accident-prone Ivy and Billy have numerous mishaps, and hardly a funeral goes by without something untoward occurring. A running subplot is Billy's pursuit of romance, often at the encouragement of Ernie Hadfield; this later ends with Billy's marriage to old schoolfriend Mary Braithwaite - who had originally been set to marry Ernie.

== Cast list ==
Actor	Character	Series
Thora Hird	Ivy Unsworth	1 to 5
Christopher Beeny	Billy Henshaw	1 to 5
Sherrie Hewson	Doreen Nesbitt (1979–1980); Mary Henshaw (née Braithwaite) (1984–1986)	1 to 2; 4 to 5
Colin Farrell	Ernie Hadfield	1 to 5
Avis Bunnage	Amy Jenkinson	1 to 3

- Richard Wilson, famous for his role as Victor Meldrew in the sitcom One Foot in the Grave, appeared in two episodes of the programme, firstly as rival undertaker Percy Openshaw and secondly as the local vicar, Reverend Chadwick.
- Two Carry On stars appear in the series; Joan Sims appears in three different episodes as different characters and Patsy Rowlands in two episodes as the district nurse, Lily Longstaff.

== Production ==
The setting for the show is the fictional Yorkshire town of Oldshaw during the 1920s and 1930s. The writer, Dick Sharples, chose this period as this was the time when undertakers were switching from horse-drawn to mechanical hearses. Location shooting took place in both Bramham and Luddenden, West Yorkshire.

The pilot for the show was aired on 4 November 1969 as part of a series of six one-off situation-comedies. The producers (Thames Television) elected not to take the series any further. It was almost ten years later when another ITV company, Yorkshire Television, commissioned a series. The theme music, "Comedy Close Up No.2" by Herbert Chappell, was supplied by the De Wolfe Music film and television music library.

== Connections and adaptations ==
- Dame Thora Hird and Dick Sharples worked together on another ITV comedy series, Hallelujah!, which was also produced by Yorkshire Television and ran from 1983 to 1984 concurrently with In Loving Memory.
- That's Your Funeral was a BBC Television sitcom based on a similar premise, but it lasted for only one series.
- RIP, a 1992 TV show produced by the Belgian BRT, borrowed many of its early screenplays directly from In Loving Memory.

== Transmission dates ==
- Pilot (B&W; 1 × 25 min): 4 November 1969; Tuesday at 8.30pm
- Series One (7 × 25 min): 21 May - 2 July 1979; Mondays at 8pm
- Series Two (7 × 25 min): 27 October - 8 December 1980; Mondays at 8pm
- Series Three (7 × 25 min): 12 October - 23 November 1982; Tuesdays at 8.30pm
- Special (1 × 25 Min): 24 December 1982; Friday at 8pm
- Series Four (7 × 25 min): 28 November 1983 – 6 February 1984; Mondays at 8pm
- Series Five (7 × 25 min): 13 February - 27 March 1986; Thursdays at 9pm

== DVD release ==
All five series (including the 1982 Christmas special) of In Loving Memory have now been released on DVD by Network. A 5-disc set of the complete series has also been released.

DVD	Year(s)	Release date
The Complete Series 1	1979	18 February 2009
The Complete Series 2	1980	6 July 2009
The Complete Series 3 plus Special	1982	5 October 2009
The Complete Series 4	1984	19 April 2010
The Complete Series 5	1986	23 August 2010
The Complete Series 1 to 5 box set	1979- 1986	18 October 2010

== Notes ==
The series was re-broadcast on ITV3 from 21 July 2015 onwards.
