= The Grove Family =

British TV soap opera (1954–1957)

- Created by: Roland and Michael Pertwee
- Starring: Edward Evans; Ruth Dunning; Peter Bryant; Christopher Beeny; Nan Braunton
- Country of origin: United Kingdom
- Original language: English
- No. of series: 1
- No. of episodes: 148

Production
- Producer: John Warrington
- Running time: 15 minutes (April 1954–September 1955); 30 minutes (September 1955–June 1957)

Original release
- Network: BBC
- Release: 9 April 1954 – 28 June 1957

The Grove Family was a British television series soap opera, generally regarded as the first of its kind broadcast in the UK, made and broadcast by the BBC Television Service from 1954 to 1957. The series concerned the life of the family of the title, who were named after the BBC's Lime Grove Studios, where the programme was made.

The programme was written by Roland and Michael Pertwee, the father and elder brother respectively of actor Jon Pertwee. As was common for British television at the time, the series was broadcast live, and very few episodes survive in the archives: only three of the original 148 episodes. One of the few surviving shows was transmitted on BBC Four in 2004. A film version produced in 1955 by the Butchers company, written by the Pertwees and featuring the television cast, exists as an example of the series. The film was entitled It's a Great Day and shown on the Talking Pictures TV channel in July 2017. During 1954, The Grove Family was viewed by almost a quarter of British people with a television. The programme was reportedly brought to an end when, after three years' writing, the Pertwees' request for a break was refused by the BBC, with the Corporation preferring to cancel the popular series altogether.

Peter Bryant, who featured as Jack Grove, later became a script editor and producer of the BBC science fiction series Doctor Who. Christopher Beeny, who played the teenage Lennie Grove, later featured in the series Upstairs, Downstairs (1971–75) and actress Ruth Dunning (Gladys Grove) later won a BAFTA award for her work on Armchair Theatre.

In 1991, during a special day of programming on BBC2 to commemorate the closing of Lime Grove, a new edition of the programme was shown, a modern production of one of the original scripts with the roles filled by popular television soap opera actors of the time, including Leslie Grantham, Anna Wing, Sue Johnston, Nick Berry, Sally Ann Matthews, Paul Parris and Kellie Bright.

== Plot ==
The lower middle-class Grove family live in the London suburb of Hendon. Patriarch Bob Grove is a builder, allowing the show to demonstrate basic home security. He lives with his mother, his wife and their four children. The first episode shows the family making their last mortgage payment, and over the course of the series Bob tries to expand his business and attain prosperity in postwar Britain. The fourth episode shows Gran buying the family a television set, a sign of the new consumerism. Gran Groves' demand "I want me tea" became a catchphrase.

== Theme tune ==
The theme tune, named Family Joke and featuring harmonica played by Tommy Reilly, was composed by Eric Spear, who went on to become better known as the composer of the theme tune to the long-running soap opera Coronation Street.

== Principal cast ==
- Edward Evans as Bob Grove
- Ruth Dunning as Gladys Grove
- Peter Bryant as Jack Grove
- Christopher Beeny as Lennie Grove
- Nancy Roberts as Gran
- Margaret Downs as Daphne Grove
- Sheila Sweet as Pat Grove
- Nan Braunton as Miss Hilda Jones

== See also ==
- Social history of the United Kingdom (1945–present)
- Post-war consensus
