= Deric Longden =

English writer and autobiographer

- Born: Deric Francis Longden; 29 November 1936; Chesterfield, Derbyshire, England
- Died: 23 June 2013 (aged 76); Huddersfield, West Yorkshire, England
- Occupations: Writer, screenwriter
- Spouses: Diana Hill (m. 1958; died 1985); Aileen Armitage (m. 1990)
- Children: 2 children and 4 stepchildren
- Writing career
- Genre: Autobiography
- Notable works: Wide-Eyed and Legless; Lost For Words

Deric Francis Longden (29 November 1936 – 23 June 2013) was a British writer, autobiographer, reporter, public speaker and broadcaster.

== Life and career ==
=== Early years ===
Longden was born in Chesterfield, Derbyshire. He was the son of Frederick Longden (16 September 1908 – 1969) and Annie Mary Longden (née Wright, 23 August 1910 – 1988) who were married in 1933. Longden left school at 15. He married Diana Hill in 1958 and they had two children together, a son and a daughter.

After various jobs he took over a small women's lingerie factory, but began writing and broadcasting in the 1970s for programmes like Does He Take Sugar? and Woman's Hour on BBC Radio 4. Longden worked for BBC Radio Derby for around 30 years and was also a football reporter. Most of his work was based on his own experience. His wife Diana's illness, which left her unable to walk and in almost constant pain, subsequently believed to be a form of chronic fatigue syndrome or myalgic encephalomyelitis, forced him to sell the factory. Afterwards, he worked as a full-time writer, broadcaster and speaker.

=== 1980s ===
In 1984, Longden met the partially-sighted novelist Aileen Armitage at a writers' conference. At the conference they discussed writing a television script together about disability, with Longden's wife Diana at the heart of the story. Armitage and Diana became devoted friends, notwithstanding the evident attraction between Deric and Aileen; indeed, Longden revealed in his book that Diana had hoped that the two would marry after her own death.

Diana Longden died in 1985.

Diana’s Story was published in 1989 and became a bestseller. The book describes his life with his rapidly deteriorating wife, who was suffering from an illness that doctors at that time could not understand.

=== 1990s ===
Longden and Armitage married in 1990.

Longden published a second book, Lost For Words, in 1991. This book focusses on Longden's eccentric mother Annie and her life as an elderly woman living alone, grappling with the effects of strokes and her decline into old age.

In the 1990s Longden published a further three books, The Cat Who Came in from the Cold (1991), I'm a Stranger Here Myself (1994) and Enough to Make a Cat Laugh (1996), which describe his life with Armitage and their cats.

==== Television films ====
Longden's first book, Diana's Story, was adapted for television in 1993 with the release of the TV film Wide-Eyed and Legless, known as The Wedding Gift in the US, starring Julie Walters as Diana Longden, Jim Broadbent as Deric Longden, Sian Thomas as Aileen Armitage and Thora Hird as Deric's mother Annie Longden. Longden co-wrote the script with Jack Rosenthal.

In 1998, Longden's second book, Lost for Words, was also adapted for television. Lost for Words was screened in January 1999. Thora Hird reprised her role as Annie Longden, whilst the other cast members were replaced: Pete Postlethwaite played Deric Longden and Penny Downie played Armitage. Longden also wrote the script for this. Longden and Armitage each have a cameo as a voice on an answerphone. The film won the Emmy for best foreign drama and a BAFTA for Hird as best actress. The film was repeated on ITV in 2012, following the death of Pete Postlethwaite.

=== 2000s ===
In 2000 Longden published another book. A Play on Words describes the making of the TV films Wide-Eyed and Legless and Lost For Words as well as Longden's reactions to seeing actors play himself and his mother. He wrote how Thora Hird's performance as his mother was so convincing that his memory ended up confusing the two.

A further book, Paws in the Proceedings followed in 2007.

=== 2010s ===
Longden's last book, TailPieces (2012), is a special personal collection of his favourite short stories and articles on cats.

== Later life and death ==
Longden and Armitage lived together in Huddersfield.

Longden was ill during the last decade of his life. He suffered a series of ministrokes which meant he was unable to write. He also suffered from epilepsy and for 18 months was unable to drive as a result of this. He gradually withdrew from public life.

In 2007, Longden had an abdominal aortic aneurysm and his life was saved by surgery.

In 2012, Longden lost his voice for about eight months due to oesophagus complications. An injection into his vocal chords allowed him to speak again.

On 19 November 2012, Longden was diagnosed with terminal cancer. On 23 June 2013, he died of cancer of the oesophagus, aged 76.

== Books ==
- Diana's Story (1989)
- Lost For Words (1991)
- The Cat Who Came in from the Cold (1991)
- I'm a Stranger Here Myself (1994)
- Enough to Make a Cat Laugh (1996)
- A Play on Words (2000)
- Paws in the Proceedings (2007)
- TailPieces (2012)
