= Wide-Eyed and Legless =

- Directed by: Richard Loncraine
- Written by: Jack Rosenthal; Deric Longden
- Starring: Julie Walters; Jim Broadbent; Thora Hird; Sian Thomas; Andrew Lancel
- Music by: Colin Towns
- Production companies: BBC Films; Island World Productions
- Distributed by: The Sales Company
- Release date: 5 September 1993
- Country: United Kingdom
- Language: English

Wide-Eyed and Legless (known in the US as The Wedding Gift) is a 1993 made-for-TV British drama film, directed by Richard Loncraine starring Julie Walters, Jim Broadbent, Sian Thomas and Thora Hird.

It is based on the 1989 book Diana's Story by the writer Deric Longden, who co-wrote the script with Jack Rosenthal. The film tells the story of the final years of Deric's (played by Broadbent) marriage to his wife, Diana (Walters), who contracted a degenerative illness which left her unable to walk and in almost constant pain and which medical officials were unable to understand at the time, though now believed to be a form of chronic fatigue syndrome or myalgic encephalomyelitis. As Diana's health deteriorated, she encourages him to spend time with another woman whom Longden has met (the partially-sighted and legally blind novelist Aileen Armitage (Thomas)), to help ease his pain over her eventual death.

== Title and home media ==
Wide-Eyed and Legless was the original title of the TV adaptation shown on BBC One whilst for the American release the film's title was changed to The Wedding Gift. The film was released on Region 1 DVD.

== Cast ==
- Jim Broadbent - Deric Longden
- Julie Walters - Diana Longden
- Thora Hird - Annie Longden
- Sian Thomas - Aileen Armitage
- Moya Brady - Sheila
- Andrew Lancel - Nick
- Anastasia Mulrooney - Sally
- Frances Cox - Minnie Bonsall

== Sequel ==
An award-winning sequel, Lost for Words, focusing on Longden's elderly mother Annie (Thora Hird) and her decline into dementia, after his second marriage (to writer Armitage) followed in 1999 and saw Hird reprise her role, whilst the other cast members were replaced.

== Year-end lists ==
- 8th – Michael MacCambridge, Austin American-Statesman
- Top 10 (not ranked) – George Meyer, The Ledger
