= Man of the Moment (1955 film) =

British comedy by John Paddy Carstairs

- Directed by: John Paddy Carstairs
- Written by: Maurice Cowan (story); John Paddy Carstairs; Vernon Sylvaine
- Produced by: Hugh Stewart executive Earl St John
- Starring: Norman Wisdom; Lana Morris; Belinda Lee; Jerry Desmonde
- Cinematography: Jack E. Cox
- Edited by: John Shirley
- Music by: Philip Green
- Production companies: Rank Organisation; Group Film Productions
- Distributed by: Rank Film Distributors
- Release date: 24 November 1955 (UK)
- Running time: 88 minutes
- Country: United Kingdom
- Language: English

Man of the Moment is a 1955 British comedy film starring Norman Wisdom, Belinda Lee, Lana Morris and Jerry Desmonde. The film includes songs sung by the Beverley Sisters, including "Dreams for Sale" (Arthur Groves, Peter Carroll), "Beware" (Norman Wisdom), "Yodelee Yodelay", and "Man of the Moment" (Jack Fishman).

== Plotline ==
Norman, a file clerk in the (fictional) British Ministry of Overseas Affairs, becomes a British delegate to a diplomatic conference in Geneva, as there is no one else available. He accidentally votes against a motion that would allow intervention in the affairs of the (fictional) peaceful Pacific island nation of Tawaki. This earns him the gratitude of the Queen of Tawaki, who leaves all matters concerning her nation's future in the hands of 'Honourable Sir Norman'.

The furious governments, including America, Great Britain and the Soviet Union, which want to establish a military base on one of Tawaki's outlying islands, shower honours on Norman to persuade him to influence the Queen in their favour. One government sends a glamorous film star to seduce him before killing him, but fails in the attempt. He is then sent a parcel bomb, but he evades it. Finally, they kidnap his new girlfriend Penny. Norman chases the thugs through BBC studios, causing chaos in programmes being transmitted live.

Finally, Norman, now apparently an Ambassador, travels to Tawaki. As he addresses the Queen, a volcanic eruption completely destroys the island the governments had designs on.

== Cast ==
- Norman Wisdom as Norman
- Lana Morris as Penny
- Belinda Lee as Sonia
- Jerry Desmonde as Jackson
- Karel Štěpánek as Lom
- Garry Marsh as British delegate
- Inia Te Wiata as King of Tawaki
- Evelyn Roberts as Sir Horace
- Violet Farebrother as Queen of Tawaki
- Martin Miller as Swiss tailor
- Eugene Deckers as day lift man
- Hugh Morton as Mitchell
- Cyril Chamberlain as British delegate
- Lisa Gastoni as Chambermaid
- Harold Kasket as Enrico
- Beverley Brooks as air hostess
- Michael Ward as photographer
- Derek Sydney as Lesnevitch
- Peter Taylor as Gritter
- Josef Behrmann as Rietz
- Charles Hawtrey, play director

== Trivia ==
The television programmes interrupted by Norman chasing the thugs who kidnapped Penny comprise

- a cookery session by Philip Harben, whose nearly-ready souffle is destroyed.
- A scene from The Grove Family, in which Granny Grove trips up the thugs.
- Fabian of the Yard, in which Fabian attempts to arrest them.
- A scene from a Greek drama is disrupted.

== Production ==
It was Norman Wisdom's third film. It was known as His Lordship. Producer Hugh Stewart reportedly gave up the chance to make A Town Like Alice (1956) to do the film. Stewart went on to work a number of times with Wisdom. It was one of several comedies Lee made at Rank.

== Critical reception ==
The Monthly Film Bulletin wrote: "Norman Wisdom's third film has the advantages of a much better story and a slightly better script than his previous two. It is still overladen with an overbearing superfluity of unrestrained, frantic incident, which gives the comedian no chance at all to display his qualities in any sort of repose. There is, too, an increasing use of the near-pathological comedy of embarrassment – " shame-dreams, as it were, in which Wisdom is either wrongly dressed or undressed in the middle of a disapproving gathering; or makes a fool of himself in front of an audience; or is deliberately embarrassed by stronger people. At times, indeed, Wisdom's world seems entirely peopled by the more or less malicious; even to the good characters he has to prove his better qualities – to Penny by giving away an ice-cream to some children; to the Tawakians by (involuntarily) doing them a service. Such a mean world is not good for comedy; and this is perhaps the reason why every comic weapon must be applied so frantically. Between the consequent exhaustion and embarrassment, it is easy to overlook the moments of real comedy; but there are enough to show that, given opportunity and discipline, Wisdom might still be a good film clown agyels"

TV Guide noted, "some fine slapstick moments, including a television studio chase that interrupts several programs." Filmink wrote the film gave Wisdom's fans "what they wanted".

David Parkinson gave the film three out of five stars in the Radio Times, writing, "Norman Wisdom is almost at the peak of his powers in this typically silly comedy, in which, as ever, slapstick and sentiment jostle for centre stage ... Although we usually think of Wisdom as a bashful bungler, he also did a nice line in cockiness, and it's surprisingly amusing to watch Whitehall and Geneva dance to his tune. Jerry Desmonde again provides supreme support as the stooge."

== Box office ==
The film was a huge hit in Hungary with over two million of the population of ten million going to see it. According to Kinematograph Weekly it was a "money maker" at the British box office in 1955.
