= Lost for Words (1999 film) =

1999 British television film by Alan J.W. Bell

- Based on: Lost for Words by Deric Longden
- Directed by: Alan J. W. Bell
- Country of origin: United Kingdom

Original release
- Network: ITV
- Release: 3 January 1999

Lost for Words is a British TV film which premiered on ITV on 3 January 1999. It was adapted from his autobiographical book of the same title by Deric Longden and directed by Alan J. W. Bell. It was a sequel to Longden's earlier autobiographical film Wide-Eyed and Legless (aka The Wedding Gift). It dealt with Deric's mother Annie (Thora Hird), her decline into dementia and how Deric (Pete Postlethwaite) and his wife Aileen (Penny Downie) coped with this. For her performance, Hird won the 2000 BAFTA for Best Actress, the 1999 RTS Award for Best Actor – Female, and the 1999 National Television Award for Most Popular Actress. The programme also won a 1999 Peabody Award and the 1999 International Emmy for Best Drama.
