= Penny Downie =

Australian actress

- Born: Brisbane, Queensland, Australia
- Occupation: Actress
- Years active: 1976–present

Penny Downie is an Australian actress known for her stage and television appearances in the United Kingdom. From 2017 until 2021 she played Ellen in the British TV sitcom Back. She plays the US ambassador's house manager Frances Munning in the Netflix political thriller series The Diplomat.

== Early life and education ==
Downie was born in Brisbane, Queensland, Australia. Starting when she was four years old, she studied ballet for 13 years before deciding she preferred the theatre. She attended the National Institute of Dramatic Art (NIDA) and graduated in 1974. She then joined the Tasmanian Theatre Company for a year, before moving onto Old Tote Theatre Company for two years. Downie was a student of theatre director Joan Whalley.

== Career ==
=== Television and film ===
In 1977, Downie moved into television. For six months, she played Ronnie Heatherton in The Box, followed by a four month stint as Kelly Jameson in Bellbird. She went back to the theatre, but this time in New Zealand, before returning to Australia where she was out of work for three months.

She made appearances in Cop Shop and Skyways. As well as series such as The Sullivans and Learned Friends. In 1980, she joined the cast of Prisoner as former prostitute and inmate Kerry Vincent. Downie commuted from Sydney to Melbourne every week to tape her episodes.

She moved to the United Kingdom in the early 1980s. In 1984 she appeared as Dee Rogers in the Minder episode "If Money Be the Food of Love, Play On". Her many UK TV credits include Inspector Morse, Kavanagh QC, The Inspector Lynley Mysteries, Spooks, and New Tricks. She also appeared in The Girl in the Cafe.

In 2009, she played Mrs. Pienaar in the Clint Eastwood film Invictus.

In 2013, she appeared as Rev Mother Augustine in the Father Brown episode "The Bride of Christ". In 2014, Downie starred in an episode of Suspects as Fiona Sullivan, and appeared as Lady Sinderby, mother of Atticus Aldridge, in series five of Downton Abbey.

In 2016, Downie played Home Secretary Rose Kenter in American action thriller London Has Fallen, and portrayed Janet Lee Bouvier, mother of Jacqueline Kennedy Onassis in the Pablo Larrain-directed historical drama Jackie. She also appeared on television in British-Canadian co-production Houdini & Doyle as Mrs. Sulzbach, and featured in three episodes of the 2016 BBC1 espionage drama The Secret Agent, where she played Lady Blackwood. In 2017, she had a supporting role as Tid in biographical drama Breathe, as well as a six-episode stint on Channel 4 sitcom Back as Ellen. She reprised her role for a further six episodes in 2021.

In 2019, she appeared in BBC Radio 4 horror podcast series The Lovecraft Investigations as Barbara, and played Valerie Chandris in three episodes of American thriller drama series Absentia. She also starred in nine episodes of Netflix series The Crown as Princess Alice, Duchess of Gloucester.

Beginning in 2023, Downie played Frances Munning in the American political thriller The Diplomat.

In 2024, she featured in four episodes of British limited series A Gentleman in Moscow as Countess Rostova, based on the novel by Amor Towles. The series premiered on Paramount+ on 29 March 2024.

On 1 April, Downie was named as part of the cast for the film Boss Cat.

=== Stage ===
Downie began her career in Australia, initially in Brisbane at Twelfth Night Theatre and Brisbane Arts Theatre.

Downie is an associate artist of the Royal Shakespeare Company, where she has played roles such as Lady Anne in Richard III in the 1984 production featuring Antony Sher in the lead, and Hermione and Perdita in The Winter's Tale. She appeared in the premiere of Nick Dear's play The Art of Success in Stratford in 1986 and later at the Barbican Theatre, London, alongside Michael Kitchen and Simon Russell Beale.

In 2008, she played opposite David Tennant and Patrick Stewart as Gertrude, in the Royal Shakespeare Company's production of Hamlet which was subsequently adapted for BBC television and aired in late 2009. Downie also played the title character in Euripides' Helen at Shakespeare's Globe Theatre in 2009.

Downie played the title role in A Storm in a Flower Vase, a play based on the life of Constance Spry, which held its West End debut at the Arts Theatre.

In 2016, Downie appeared as Nat in Rabbit Hole at the Hampstead Theatre, replacing Alison Steadman.

In 2019, she starred as Helen Alving in a Royal & Derngate production of Ibsen's Ghosts, opposite James Wilby. The production garnered critical acclaim, with Downie's performance being lauded by various critics as "towering", "mesmerising" and "quietly devastating".

In 2021, she played Esther in The Lodger, which premiered at the Coronet Theatre in September 2021.

== Filmography ==
=== Film ===
Year	Title	Role	Notes
1982	Crosstalk	Cindy	
1985	Wetherby	Chrissie	
1987	Lionheart	Madelaine	
1997	Food of Love	Mary	
2000	The House of Mirth	Judy Trenor	
2009	Invictus	Mrs. Pienaar	
2011	W.E.	Dr. Vargas	
2013	Girl on a Bicycle	Margaret	
2016	London Has Fallen	Home Secretary Rose Kenter	
2016	Jackie	Janet Lee	
2017	Breathe	Tid	
2020	The Jester from Transylvania	Mrs. Pennington	
TBA	Boss Cat	Doris	

=== Television ===
Year	Film	Role	Type
1976–1977	Bellbird	Recurring role: Kelly Jamison	ABC TV series, 71 episodes
1977	The Box	Recurring Guest role: Ronnie Heatherton	TV series, 2 episodes
1979	Skyways	Guest role: Miranda	TV series, 1 episode: "George And The Hooker"
1979–1980	Cop Shop	Guest roles: Sherry Raymond / Wendy Green / Gillian Croft	TV series, 4 episodes
1980	Prisoner	Recurring role: Kerry Vincent	TV series, 12 episodes
1981	Punishment	Guest role	TV series
1982	The Sullivans	Guest role: Patty Spencer Sullivan	TV series, 1 episode
1983	Learned Friends	Regular role	ABC TV series
1984	Minder	Dee Rogers	TV series UK, 1 episode: "If Money Be the Food of Love, Play On"
1986	C.A.T.S Eyes	Guest role: Barbara Dashley	TV series UK, 1 episode: "Powerline"
1986	The Story of English	Herself - Self / Titania	TV miniseries UK, 1 episode
1986	Refuse to Dance: The Theatre of Howard Barker	Herself	TV documentary, UK
1988	Campaign	Regular role: Sarah Copeland	TV miniseries UK, 6 episodes
1988	A Taste for Death	Regular role: Inspector Kate Miskin	TV miniseries UK, 6 episodes
1991	Screen One	Guest role: Sheila	TV series UK, 1 episode: "Ex")
1991	Stanley and the Women	Regular role: Susan Duke	TV miniseries UK, 4 episodes
1992	Underbelly	Recurring role: Barbara Manning	TV series UK, 4 episodes
1993	Inspector Morse	Guest role: Nurse Wendy Hazlitt	TV series UK, 1 episode: "Deadly Slumber"
1994	Stages	Guest role: Linda	TV series UK, 1 episode
1995	The Governor	Guest role: Christina Knatchbull	TV series UK, 1 episode: "Episode #1.4"
1996	Madson	Anderton	TV series UK, 1 episode 6: "Episode 6"
1997	The Ice House	Recurring role: Phoebe Maybury	TV miniseries UK, 2 episodes
1998	A Certain Justice	Guest role: Venetia Aldridge	TV series, 1 episode
1998	Crime and Punishment	Katerina	TV movie, US
1999	Lost for Words	Aileen Longden	TV movie, UK
1999	Kavanagh QC	Guest role: Mrs. Rosalind McEnery	TV series UK, 1 episode: "Previous Convictions"
1999	Stagestruck: Gay Theatre in the 20th Century	Herself	TV series UK, 3 episodes
2001	The Cazalets	Recurring role: Margot "Sid" Sidney	TV series UK, 6 episodes
2003	Trust	Guest role: Anita Matteo	TV miniseries UK, 1 episode: "Spilt Milk"
2003	Byron	Lady Judith Milbanke	TV movie, UK
2004	The Inspector Lynley Mysteries	Guest role: Dr. Tessa Jellicoe	TV series UK, 1 episode: "If Wishes Were Horses"
2004	Spooks	Guest role: Prosecution QC	TV series UK, 1 episode: "Episode #3.6" (uncredited)
2004	Sherlock Holmes and the Case of the Silk Stocking	Recurring role: Judith Massingham	TV movie, UK/US
2005	Timewatch	Caecilia	TV series documentary UK, 1 episode: "Murder In Rome"
2005	Falling	Hazel	TV movie, UK
2005	The Girl in the Café	Ruth	TV movie, UK/US
2005	Murder in Suburbia	Guest role: Zenith	TV series UK, 1 episode: "Golden Oldies"
2005	All About George	Regular role: Evelyn	TV series UK, 6 episodes
2005	Trial & Retribution	Guest role: Mrs Thorpe	TV series UK, 1 episode: "The Lovers: Part 1"
2005	Murder in Rome	Caecilia	TV movie, UK
2006	Judge John Deed	Guest role: Moira Blackthorn	TV series UK, 1 episode: "My Daughter, Right or Wrong"
2006	Agatha Christie's Poirot	Guest role: Frances Cloade	TV series UK, 1 episode: "Taken at the Flood"
2006	New Street Law	Honor Scammell / Honor Scammel	TV series UK, 14 episodes: 2006–2007
2007	The Commander: Fraudster	Jane Griffith	TV movie, UK
2008	New Tricks	Diane King	TV series UK, 1 episode: "Communal Living"
2009	Hamlet	Gertrude	TV movie, UK/US/Japan
2010; 2014	Doctors	Jessica Boyd / Maisie Padkin	TV series UK, 2 episodes
2011	Waking the Dead	Recurring role: Bonnie Yorke	TV series UK, 2 episodes: "Solidarity"
2011	Silk	Guest role: Helen Guthrie	TV series UK, 1 episode: "Episode #1.6"
2011	The Shadow Line	Guest role: Caroline Monroe	TV mini-series UK, 1 episode: "Episode #1.4"
2011	Law & Order: UK	Recurring role: Rachel Mathesson	TV series UK, 2 episodes
2012	Vera	Guest role: Veronica	TV series UK, 1 episode: "Silent Voices"
2012	Threesome	Guest role: Judge	TV series UK, 1 episode: "I Don't"
2013	Ripper Street	Guest role: Flora Gable	TV series UK/IRELAND, 1 episode: "The King Came Calling"
2013	Father Brown	Guest role: Rev Mother Augustine	TV series UK, 1 episode: "The Bride of Christ"
2013	Silent Witness	Guest role: Anne Percival	TV series UK, 1 episode: "True Love Waits: Part 2"
2013	Breathless	Recurring role: Penny	TV series UK, 2 episodes
2014	Suspects	Guest role: Fiona Sullivan	TV series UK, 1 episode: "Alone"
2014	Siblings	Guest role: Dr. Barker (as Pennie Downie)	TV series UK, 1 episode: "Intern School"
2014	Downton Abbey	Recurring role: Lady Sinderby	TV series UK, 4 episodes
2016	Houdini and Doyle	Recurring role: Mrs. Sulzbach	TV miniseries UK/Canada, 1 episode
2016	The Secret Agent	Recurring role: Lady Blackwood	TV miniseries UK, 3 episodes
2017–2021	Back	Regular role: Ellen	TV series UK, 12 episodes
2019	The Lovecraft Investigations	Barbara	Podcast series UK, 1 episode
2019	Absentia	Recurring role: Valerie Chandris	TV series US/Israel, 3 episodes
2019–2020	The Crown	Recurring role: Princess Alice, Duchess of Gloucester	TV series UK, 9 episodes
2023–present	The Diplomat	Frances Munning	13 episodes
2024	A Gentleman in Moscow	The Countess	4 episodes
