= Thora Hird =

British actress (1911–2003)

Dame Thora Hird DBE
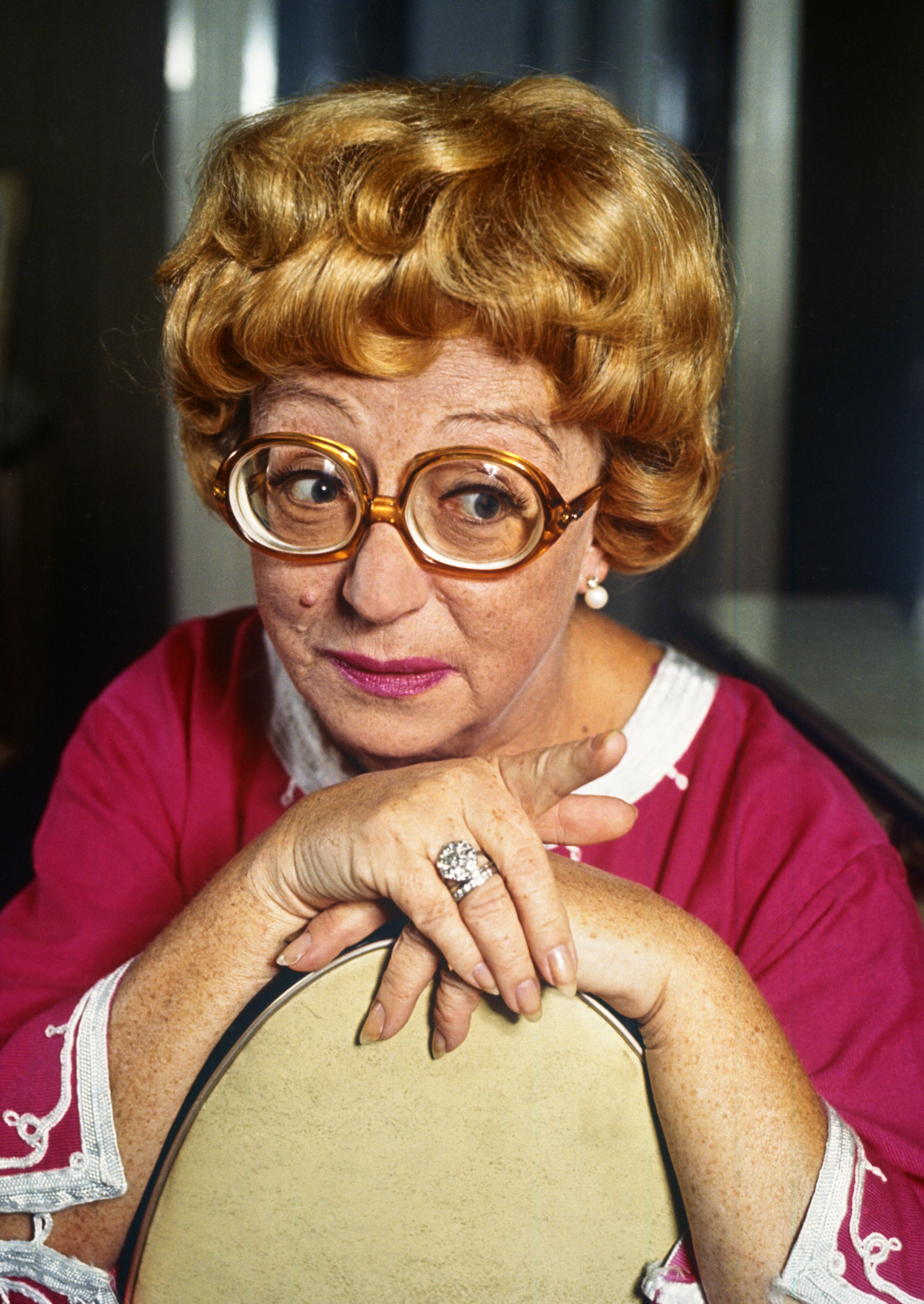
- Hird in 1974
- Born: 28 May 1911; Morecambe, Lancashire, England
- Died: 15 March 2003 (aged 91); Twickenham, London, England
- Resting place: Chichester Crematorium and Garden of Remembrance, Chichester, West Sussex, England
- Occupation: Actress
- Years active: 1931–2003
- Notable work: See here
- Television: Last of the Summer Wine; In Loving Memory; Hallelujah!
- Spouse: James Scott (m. 1937; died 1994)
- Children: Janette Scott

Dame Thora Hird (28 May 1911 – 15 March 2003) was an English actress. In a career spanning over 70 years, she appeared in more than 100 films, as well as many television roles, becoming a household name and a British institution.

Hird was a three-time winner of the BAFTA TV Award for Best Actress, for Talking Heads: A Cream Cracker Under the Settee (1989), Talking Heads: Waiting for the Telegram (1999) and Lost for Words (2000). She also received a BAFTA Special Award in 1994. Her film credits included The Love Match (1955), The Entertainer (1960), A Kind of Loving (1962) and The Nightcomers (1971).

== Early life and career ==
Hird was born on 28 May 1911 in the Lancashire seaside town of Morecambe to James Henry Hird and Jane Mary (née Mayor). Her family background was largely theatrical: her mother had been an actress, while her father managed a number of entertainment venues in Morecambe, including the Royalty Theatre, where Hird made her first appearance, and the West End Pier. Thora first appeared on stage in 1911 at the age of two months in a play her father was managing, carried on stage in her mother's arms. She worked at the local Co-operative store before joining the Morecambe Repertory Theatre.

Hird often described her father, who initially did not want her to be an actress, as her sternest critic and attributed much of her talent as an actress and comedian to his guidance. In 1944 she made her West End debut in the Esther McCracken play No Medals.

Although Hird left Morecambe in the late 1940s, she retained her affection for the town, referring to herself as a "sand grown 'un", the colloquial term for anyone born in Morecambe.

Initially, Hird made regular appearances in films, including the wartime propaganda film Went the Day Well? (1942, known as 48 Hours in the USA), in which she is shown wielding a rifle to defend a house from German paratroopers. She worked with the British film comedian Will Hay and featured in The Entertainer (1960), which starred Laurence Olivier, as well as A Kind of Loving (1962) with Alan Bates and June Ritchie.

Hird gained her highest profile in television comedy, notably the sitcoms Meet the Wife (1963–66), In Loving Memory (1979–86), Hallelujah! (1983–84) and, for nearly two decades, as Edie Pegden in Last of the Summer Wine (1986–2003). Hird played a variety of roles, including the nurse in Romeo and Juliet, and won BAFTA Best Actress awards for her roles in two of Alan Bennett's Talking Heads monologues.

Hird starred as Captain Emily Ridley in the sitcom Hallelujah! (1983–84) about the Salvation Army, a movement which she supported throughout her life. Hird also portrayed Mrs Speck, the housekeeper of the Mayor of Gloucester, in The Tailor of Gloucester (1989).

In 1993 she played Annie Longden, mother of Deric Longden in Wide-Eyed and Legless (known as The Wedding Gift outside the UK) and reprised her role in the 1999 TV film Lost for Words, which won her a BAFTA for Best Actress.

== Religious broadcasts ==
Hird was a committed Christian, hosting the religious programmes Your Songs of Praise Choice (1979–1983) and Praise Be! (1984–1993), a spin-off from Songs of Praise on the BBC. Her work for charity and on television in spite of old age and ill health made her an institution. Her advertisements for Churchill stairlifts also kept her in the public eye.

== Honours ==
She was invested as an Officer of the Order of the British Empire (OBE) in the 1983 Birthday Honours and raised to Dame Commander (DBE) in the 1993 Birthday Honours. She received an honorary D.Litt. from Lancaster University in 1989.

== Later life ==
In December 1998, using a wheelchair, Hird played a brief but energetic cameo role as the mother of Dolly on Dinnerladies, a sarcastic character who was particularly bitter towards her daughter.

Her final acting work was for BBC Radio 7, which was recorded in 2002 and broadcast some months after her death: a monologue written for her by Alan Bennett entitled The Last of the Sun, in which she played a forthright, broad-minded woman, immobile in an old people's home but still able to take a stand against the censorious attitude of her own daughter.

== This Is Your Life ==
She was the subject of This Is Your Life on two occasions: in January 1964 when she was surprised by Eamonn Andrews, and in December 1996, when Michael Aspel surprised her while filming on location for Last of the Summer Wine.

== Personal life ==
Hird married musician James Scott in 1937. They had a daughter, actress Janette Scott, in 1938. Hird was mother-in-law to jazz singer Mel Tormé for eleven years. Hird was widowed in 1994, having been married for 57 years.

Hird underwent a heart bypass operation in 1992. She suffered from severe osteoarthritis, had repeated hip replacements and used a wheelchair in her later life.

== Death ==
Hird died on 15 March 2003 aged 91, following a stroke. A memorial service was held on 15 September 2003 at Westminster Abbey attended by more than 2,000 people, including Alan Bennett, Sir David Frost, Melvyn Bragg and Victoria Wood.

In July 2019, a commemorative blue plaque to Thora Hird was installed by The Theatre and Film Guild of Great Britain and America, at the Bayswater home where she lived for over 50 years.

== Filmography ==
=== Film ===
Year	Title	Role	Notes
1942	The Black Sheep of Whitehall	Joyce	
1942	Went the Day Well?	Ivy Dawking	
1942	Go to Blazes	Elsie	Short
1942	The Next of Kin	ATS Driver	
1944	Two Thousand Women	Mrs. Burtshaw	
1947	The Courtneys of Curzon Street	Maud	
1948	Corridor of Mirrors	Visitor in Madame Tussauds	
1948	My Brother Jonathan	Ada	
1948	The Weaker Sex	Mrs. Gaye	
1949	Once a Jolly Swagman	Ma Fox	
1949	Lost Daughter	Mrs. Skinner	
1949	Fools Rush In	Mrs. Coot	
1949	A Boy, a Girl and a Bike	Mrs. Bates	
1949	Conspirator	Broaders	
1949	Madness of the Heart	Rosa	
1949	Maytime in Mayfair	Janet	
1949	The Cure for Love	Mrs. Dorbell	
1949	Boys in Brown	Mrs. Knowles	
1950	Once a Sinner	Mrs. James	
1950	The Magnet	Nanny's Friend	
1951	The Galloping Major	Tea Stall Proprietress	
1952	The Frightened Man	Vera	
1952	The Hundred Hour Hunt	Mrs. Cornelius	
1952	Time Gentlemen, Please!	Alice Crouch	
1953	The Long Memory	Mrs. Pewsey	
1953	The Great Game	Miss Rawlings	
1953	Street Corner	Mrs. Perkins	
1953	Turn the Key Softly	Mrs. Rowan	
1953	Personal Affair	Mrs. Usher	
1953	Background	Mrs. Humphries	
1953	A Day to Remember	Mrs. Trott	
1954	The Crowded Day	Eunice's mother	
1954	Don't Blame the Stork	Agnes O'Connor	
1954	For Better, for Worse	Mrs. Doyle	
1954	Tiger by the Tail	Mary	
1955	The Love Match	Sal Brown	
1955	The Quatermass Xperiment	Rosie	
1955	Simon and Laura	Jessie	
1955	One Good Turn	Cook	
1956	Women Without Men	Granny Rafferty	U.S. title Blonde Bait
1956	Sailor Beware!	Mrs. Lack	
1956	Home and Away	Margie	
1957	The Good Companions	Mrs. Oakroyd	
1957	These Dangerous Years	Mrs. Larkin	
1958	Further Up the Creek	Mrs. Galloway	
1958	A Clean Sweep	Vera Watson	Short
1960	The Entertainer	Ada Lapford	
1961	Over the Odds	Mrs. Carter	
1962	A Kind of Loving	Mrs. Rothwell	
1962	Term of Trial	Mrs. Taylor	
1963	Bitter Harvest	Mrs. Jessup	
1964	Rattle of a Simple Man	Mrs. Winthram	
1970	Some Will, Some Won't	Agnes Russell	
1971	The Nightcomers	Mrs. Grose	
1983	Entry	Narrator	Short
1988	Consuming Passions	Mrs. Gordon	
1999	Julie and the Cadillacs	Julie's grandmother	

=== Television ===
Year	Title	Role	Notes
1947	Mary Rose	Mrs. Otery	TV film
1949	The Winslow Boy	Violet	TV film
1951	Sunday Night Theatre	Anna Priashkina	Episode: "The Bachelor"
1951	What Happens to Love	Mrs. Rowbotham	TV film
1955	The Queen Came By	Emmie Slee	TV film
1955	The Adventures of Robin Hood	Ada	Episode: "A Husband for Marian"
1956	Armchair Theatre	Momma Brodsky	Episode: "The Same Sky"
1958	Saturday Playhouse	Aggie Thompson	Episode: "So Many Children"
1959	Blackpool Show Parade	Mrs. McTaggart	Episode: "Happy Days"
1960	Bootsie and Snudge	Emily	Episode: "Johnson's Retirement"
1961	ITV Playhouse	Helen Curvis	Episode: "Hi Diddle Diddle"
1963	Z-Cars	Mrs. Edwards	Episode: "Nothing Serious"
1963	Drama 61-67	Mrs. Hope	Episode: "Drama '63: Albert Hope"
1963	Comedy Playhouse	Thora Blacklock	Episode: "The Bed"
1964–1966	Meet the Wife	Thora Blacklock	Main role
1964	First Night	Queenie	Episode: "All Things Bright and Beautiful"
1964	Festival	Mrs. Baines	Episode: "Say Nothing"
1965	My Perfect Husband	Thora	TV film
1966	The Wednesday Play	Blanche Hoskins	Episode: "Who's a Good Boy Then?"
1966	Dixon of Dock Green	Alice Leggett	Episode: "Face at the Window"
1966	Jackanory	Storyteller	5 episodes
1967, 1975	Play of the Month	Nurse, Clara Soppitt	Episodes: "Romeo and Juliet", "When We Are Married"
1968–69	The First Lady	Sarah Danby	Main role
1969	ITV Sunday Night Theatre	Mrs. Ogden	Episode: "It Calls for a Great Deal of Love"
1969–70	Ours Is a Nice House	Thora Parker	TV series
1971	Seasons of the Year	Widow Butley	Episode: "The Three Graces"
1971	Stage 2	Mrs. Hardcastle	Episode: "She Stoops to Conquer"
1971–72, 1977, 1982	Play for Today	Gwen, Doris, Olive Major, Aunty Kitty	Episodes: "The Fox Trot", "The Villa Maroc", "The Mayor's Charity", "Intensive Care"
1974	Billy Liar	Miss Duggins	Episode: "Billy and the Bed-Sit"
1975	Softly, Softly: Task Force	Mary Meegan	Episode: "Dorothy's Birthday"
1977	The Boys and Mrs B	Mrs. Battley	TV short
1977	Young at Heart	Ethel Collyer	Episode: "Pilot"
1978	Me! I'm Afraid of Virginia Woolf	Mrs. Hopkins	TV film
1979	Thomas & Sarah	Mrs. Entwistle	Episode: "Made in Heaven"
1979–86	In Loving Memory	Ivy Unsworth	Main role
1980–82	Flesh and Blood	Mabel Brassington	TV series
1983	Objects of Affection	Elizabeth Mary Rhodes	Episode: "Say Something Happened"
1983–84	Hallelujah!	Capt. Emily Ridley	Main role
1986–2003	Last of the Summer Wine	Edie Pegden	Regular role
1988, 1998	Talking Heads	Doris, Violet	Episodes: "A Cream Cracker Under the Settee", "Waiting for the Telegram"
1989	The Tailor of Gloucester	Mrs. Speck	TV film
1989–90	All Creatures Great and Small	Mrs. Clarke	Episodes: "The Best Time", "Promises to Keep"
1990	The Tale of Little Pig Robinson	Old Betsy	TV film
1991	Perfect Scoundrels	Martha	Episode: "Grandmother's Footsteps"
1992	The Good Guys	Edna Wood	Episode: "Her Finest Hour"
1992	Memento Mori	Jean Taylor	Screen Two series 8
1993	Wide-Eyed and Legless (known as The Wedding Gift outside the UK)	Annie Longden	
1993	Goggle Eyes	Mrs. Harrington	Episode: "1.1"
1994	Pat and Margaret	Jim's mother	
1994	Under the Hammer	Nanny Tucker	Episode: "The Spectre at the Feast"
1994	Heartbeat	Hannah Stockdale	Episode: "Lost and Found"
1995, 1999	The Queen's Nose	Postmistress	Episodes: "1.1", "1.4", "Harmony's Return"
1998	Dinnerladies	Enid	Episode: "Moods"
1999	The Nearly Complete and Utter History of Everything	Ida	Episode: "Philosophy of a Hairdresser"
1999	Hilltop Hospital	Gracey Greyshell	Episode: "Gracey Greyshell's Last Day"
1999	Lost for Words	Annie Longden	TV film

== Bibliography ==
- Dame Thora Hird's autobiography, Scene And Hird (1976), ISBN 978-0491019651
