= Peter Sallis =

English actor (1921–2017)

Peter Sallis OBE
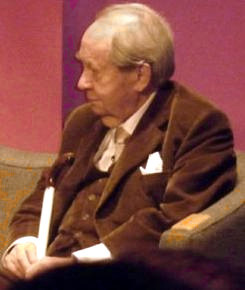
- Sallis in 2008
- Born: Peter John Sallis; 1 February 1921; Twickenham, Middlesex, England
- Died: 2 June 2017 (aged 96); Northwood, London, England
- Resting place: St John the Evangelist Churchyard, Upperthong, West Yorkshire, England
- Occupations: Actor, voice actor
- Years active: 1943–2010
- Notable work: Wallace & Gromit, Last of the Summer Wine
- Height: 5 ft 6 in (168 cm)
- Spouse: Elaine Usher (m. 1957; div. 1965)
- Children: Crispian Sallis

Peter John Sallis (1 February 1921 – 2 June 2017) was an English actor. He was the original voice of Wallace in the Academy Award-winning Wallace & Gromit films and played Norman "Cleggy" Clegg in Last of the Summer Wine from its 1973 inception until the final episode in 2010, making him the only actor to appear in all 295 episodes. Additionally, he portrayed Norman Clegg's father in the prequel series First of the Summer Wine.

Among his television credits, Peter Sallis appeared in Danger Man, The Avengers, Doctor Who (The Ice Warriors), The Persuaders! and The Ghosts of Motley Hall. Peter Sallis' film appearances included the Hammer horror films The Curse of the Werewolf (1961) and Taste the Blood of Dracula (1970).

== Early life ==
Peter John Sallis was born on 1 February 1921 in Twickenham, Middlesex (now in Greater London), the only child of bank manager Harry Sallis (1889–1964) and Dorothy Amea Frances (née Barnard; 1891–1975). After attending Minchenden Grammar School in Southgate, Sallis went to work in a bank, working on shipping transactions. He and his family moved to Leigh-on-Sea in Essex, after his mother had fallen in love with her physician, but he continued to attend school, for a year, at Minchenden. After the outbreak of the Second World War, he joined the Royal Air Force. He was unable to serve as aircrew because of a serum albumin disorder and was told he might black out at high altitudes. He became a wireless mechanic instead, and went on to teach radio procedures at RAF Cranwell, for which he won a Korda Scholarship.

== Career ==
=== Theatre work ===
Sallis began his career as an amateur actor during his four years with the RAF, when one of his students offered him the lead in an amateur production of Noël Coward's Hay Fever. After his success in the role, he resolved to become an actor after the war, winning a Korda scholarship and training at the Royal Academy of Dramatic Art. He made his first professional appearance on the London stage in September 1946 in a walk-on part in Richard Brinsley Sheridan's The Scheming Lieutenant (1775).

Sallis then spent three years in repertory theatre, before appearing in his first speaking role on the London stage in 1949. Other roles followed in the 1950s and 1960s, including Orson Welles' 1955 production of Moby Dick—Rehearsed. In his autobiography, Fading into the Limelight, Sallis recounts a later meeting with Welles where he received a mysterious telephone call summoning him to the deserted Gare d'Orsay in Paris, where Welles announced he wanted him to dub Hungarian bit-players in his cinema adaptation of Franz Kafka's The Trial (1962). Sallis wrote that "the episode was Kafka-esque, to coin a phrase". Later, he was in the first West End production of Cabaret in 1968, opposite Judi Dench.

Sallis appeared in the Hal Prince–produced musical She Loves Me in 1963. Though not a success, it led to him making his Broadway debut the following year. Prince was producer of a musical based on the work of Sir Arthur Conan Doyle's Sherlock Holmes called Baker Street. Sallis was asked by Prince to take the role of Dr. Watson to Fritz Weaver's Sherlock Holmes. The show ran for six months on Broadway.

Just before Baker Street ended, he was offered the role of Wally in John Osborne's Inadmissible Evidence, which had been played by Arthur Lowe in London, with Nicol Williamson reprising the lead role. The production was troubled, with Williamson hitting producer David Merrick with a bottle and walking out, before being persuaded to continue. The show was a minor success, and ran for six months in New York, opening at the Belasco Theater before transferring to the Shubert Theater. Sallis reprised his role in the 1968 film adaptation.

=== Television and films ===
Sallis' first extended television role was as Samuel Pepys in the BBC serial The Diary of Samuel Pepys in 1958. He appeared in Danger Man in the episode "Find and Destroy", (1960–1963) he played Armand Lachaume in the Maigret TV series (1961) as Gordon. He appeared in the BBC Doctor Who story The Ice Warriors (1967), playing renegade scientist Elric Penley; and in 1983 was due to play the role of Striker in another Doctor Who serial, Enlightenment, but he had to withdraw and was replaced by Keith Barron.

He appeared as schoolteacher Mr Gladstone in an episode of the first series of Catweazle in 1970. He was cast in the BBC comedy series The Culture Vultures (1970), which saw him play stuffy Professor George Hobbs to Leslie Phillips's laid-back rogue Dr Michael Cunningham. During the production, Phillips was rushed to hospital with an internal haemorrhage, and, as a result, only five episodes were completed.

Sallis acted alongside Roger Moore and Tony Curtis in an episode of The Persuaders! ("The Long Goodbye", 1971). He appeared in many British films of the 1960s and 1970s,including Saturday Night and Sunday Morning (1960), Doctor in Love (1960), The Curse of the Werewolf (1961), The V.I.P.s (1963), Charlie Bubbles (1967), Scream and Scream Again (1969), Taste the Blood of Dracula, Wuthering Heights (1970), The Incredible Sarah (1976) and Who Is Killing the Great Chefs of Europe? (1978). Additionally, in 1968, he was cast as the well-intentioned Coker in a BBC Radio production of John Wyndham's The Day of the Triffids.

He played a priest in the TV film Frankenstein: The True Story (1973), and the following year he played Mr Bonteen in the BBC period drama The Pallisers.

Sallis was cast in a pilot for Comedy Playhouse which became the first episode of Last of the Summer Wine (retrospectively titled "Of Funerals and Fish", 1973), as the unobtrusive lover of a quiet life, Norman Clegg. The pilot was successful and the BBC commissioned a series. Sallis had already worked on stage with Michael Bates, who played the unofficial ringleader Blamire in the first two series. Sallis played the role of Clegg from 1973 to 2010, and was the only cast member to appear in every episode. He also appeared, in 1988, as Clegg's father in First of the Summer Wine, a prequel to Last of the Summer Wine set in 1939.

He appeared in the children's series The Ghosts of Motley Hall (1976–78), in which he played Arnold Gudgin, an estate agent who did not want to see the hall fall into the wrong hands, and he played Rodney Gloss in the BBC series Murder Most English (1977). In the same period, he starred alongside Northern comic actor David Roper in the ITV sitcom Leave it to Charlie as Charlie's pessimistic boss. The programme ran for four series, ending in 1980. Sallis also played the part of the ghost-hunter Milton Guest in the children's paranormal drama series The Clifton House Mystery (1978).

=== Voice acting ===
Sallis was the narrator on Rocky Hollow (1983), a show produced by Bumper Films, who later produced Fireman Sam, and understudied Ian Carmichael as the voice of Rat in the British television series The Wind in the Willows (1984–89), based on the book by Kenneth Grahame and produced by Cosgrove Hall Films. Alongside him were Michael Hordern as Badger, David Jason as Toad and Richard Pearson as Mole. Also in 1983, he played the lead character Jim Bloggs, alongside Brenda Bruce as Hilda, in a BBC Radio 4 adaptation of Raymond Briggs' When the Wind Blows. Sallis appeared in the last episode of Rumpole of the Bailey (1992), and he later starred alongside Brenda Blethyn, Kevin Whately and Anna Massey in the one-off ITV1 drama Belonging (2004).

Sallis also narrated a few stories of the children's television series Postman Pat for audio cassettes when the original voice actor Ken Barrie was not available, and also voiced Hugo in the animated series Victor and Hugo: Bunglers in Crime for audio cassettes (filling in for The Wind in the Willows co-star David Jason, who was the usual voice of Hugo, although Jason's voice can still be heard in the opening and closing theme songs).

While a student in 1983, animator Nick Park wrote to Sallis asking him if he would voice his character Wallace, an eccentric inventor. Sallis agreed to do so for a donation of £50 to his favourite charity. The work was eventually released in 1989 and Aardman Animations' Wallace and Gromit: A Grand Day Out went on to win a BAFTA award. Sallis reprised his role in the Oscar- and BAFTA Award-winning films The Wrong Trousers in 1993 and A Close Shave in 1995.

Though the characters were temporarily retired in 1996, Sallis returned to voice Wallace in several short films and in the Oscar-winning 2005 motion picture Wallace & Gromit: The Curse of the Were-Rabbit, for which he won an Annie Award for Best Voice Acting in an Animated Feature Production. In 2008, Sallis voiced a new Wallace and Gromit adventure, A Matter of Loaf and Death. After the Curse of the Were-Rabbit, Sallis's eyesight began to fail as a result of macular degeneration, and he used a talking portable typewriter with a specially illuminated scanner to continue working. His last role as Wallace was in 2010's Wallace and Gromit's World of Invention. Sallis then retired due to ill health, with Ben Whitehead taking over the role.

== Autobiography ==
In 2006, Sallis published an autobiography entitled Fading into the Limelight. As well as his 36 years in Last of the Summer Wine, Sallis also recounts the early era of his relationship with Wallace & Gromit creator Nick Park when it took six years for A Grand Day Out to be completed. He says that his work as Wallace has "raised his standing a few notches in the public eye".

== Personal life ==
Sallis married actress Elaine Usher at St. John's Wood Church in London on 9 February 1957. However, it was a turbulent relationship, with Usher leaving him sixteen times before they divorced in 1965 on grounds of desertion and adultery. They eventually reconciled and continued to live together until 1999. Sallis remained close to Usher until her death in 2014. They had one son, Crispian Sallis (born 1959), and two grandchildren. Sallis also lived with three cats in a small cottage.

Sallis suffered from macular degeneration, and in 2005 recorded an appeal on BBC Radio 4 on behalf of the Macular Society, of which he was a patron. He also recorded on behalf of the society a television appeal, which was broadcast on BBC One on 8 March 2009. Following his diagnosis of the disease, Aardman produced a short animated film for the society.

Sallis was awarded the OBE in the 2007 Birthday Honours for services to Drama. On 17 May 2009, he appeared on the BBC Radio 4 programme Desert Island Discs, selecting Sibelius' Symphony No. 5 in E-flat major as his favourite. Just before his death, he recorded/voiced Wallace one last time for the hospital elevators inside the Bristol Royal Hospital for Children. Aardman did this to make his voice live on forever.

Sallis died from natural causes at the Denville Hall nursing home in Northwood, London, on 2 June 2017, aged 96. He was buried next to fellow Last of the Summer Wine actor Bill Owen in the churchyard of St John's Parish Church, Upperthong, near the town of Holmfirth in Yorkshire, the home of the sitcom.

== Selected acting credits ==
=== Film ===
Year	Title	Role	Notes
1954	Child's Play	Bill	Filmed in 1952
1954	Stranger from Venus	Soldier	Uncredited
1956	Anastasia	Grischa	Uncredited
1958	The Doctor's Dilemma	Secretary at Picture Gallery (Mr. Denby)	
1959	The Scapegoat	Customs Official	
1960	Doctor in Love	Love-Struck Patient	Uncredited
1960	Saturday Night and Sunday Morning	Man in Suit	Uncredited
1961	No Love for Johnnie	M.P.	
1961	The Curse of the Werewolf	Don Enrique	
1962	I Thank a Fool	Sleazy Doctor	
1963	The V.I.P.s	Doctor	
1963	The Mouse on the Moon	Russian Delegate	
1964	The Third Secret	Lawrence Jacks	
1964	Clash by Night	Victor Lush	
1965	Rapture	Armand	
1967	Charlie Bubbles	Solicitor	
1968	Inadmissible Evidence	Hudson	
1970	The Reckoning	Keresley	Uncredited
1970	Scream and Scream Again	Schweitz	
1970	Taste the Blood of Dracula	Samuel Paxton	
1970	My Lover, My Son	Sir Sidney Brent	
1970	Wuthering Heights	Mr. Shielders	
1971	The Night Digger	Reverend Rupert Palafox	
1976	The Incredible Sarah	Thierry	
1977	Full Circle	Jeffrey Branscombe	
1978	Who Is Killing the Great Chefs of Europe?	St. Claire	
1982	Witness for the Prosecution	Carter	
1986	A Dangerous Kind of Love	Mr. Walker	
1989	A Grand Day Out	Wallace	Voice
1993	The Wrong Trousers	Wallace	Voice
1995	A Close Shave	Wallace	Voice
2001	Hotel	Radio Voice of Little Ashford Flying Club	Uncredited
2001	The Incredible Adventures of Wallace and Gromit	Wallace	Voice
2002	Wallace and Gromit's Cracking Contraptions	Wallace	Voice
2004	Belonging	Nathan	
2005	Wallace & Gromit: The Curse of the Were-Rabbit	Wallace, Hutch	Voice, Won – Annie Award for Voice Acting in a Feature Production
2005	Colour Me Kubrick	The Second Patient	Cameo
2008	A Matter of Loaf and Death	Wallace	Voice (Final film role), character finished by Ben Whitehead

=== Television ===
Year	Title	Role	Notes
1958	The Diary of Samuel Pepys	Samuel Pepys	
1959	The Invisible Man	Nesib	Episode: "Crisis in the Desert"
1960–1973	Armchair Theatre	Various roles	
1961	Danger Man	John Gordon	Episode: "Find and Destroy"
1961	A Chance of Thunder	Howard	3 episodes
1962	Maigret	Armand Lachaume	Episode: "The Reluctant Witnesses"
1964	The Avengers	Hal Anderson	Episode: "The Wringer"
1964	The Sullavan Brothers	Kenneth K. Hirst	1 episode
1967	Doctor Who	Penley	1 serial: The Ice Warriors
1970	Catweazle	Stuffy Gladstone	
1970	The Culture Vultures	Professor George Hobbes	
1971	The Persuaders!	David Piper	
1971	Public Eye	Eddie Meadows	
1972	Callan	Routledge	
1972	The Moonstone	Mr. Bruff	
1973–2010	Last of the Summer Wine	Norman Clegg	
1973	Frankenstein: The True Story	Priest	
1974	The Pallisers	Mr. Bonteen	
1974	Who Killed Lamb?	Lloyd	
1974	The Capone Investment	Wheatfield	
1976–1978	The Ghosts of Motley Hall	Mr Gudgin	
1978	The Clifton House Mystery	Milton Guest	
1978	She Loves Me	Ladislav Sipos	TV movie
1978–1980	Leave It To Charlie	Arthur Simister	
1980	Tales Of The Unexpected	Solicitor	Episode: "Picture Of A Place"
1983	Rocky Hollow	Narrator	
1984	Strangers and Brothers	Leonard March	3 episodes
1984–1990	The Wind in the Willows	Rat	Voice
1987	The New Statesman	Sidney Bliss	2 episodes
1987	The Bretts	Dr. Woodward	1 episode
1988–1989	First of the Summer Wine	Mr David Clegg	
1990	Come Home Charlie and Face Them	Evan Rhys-Jones	
1992	Rumpole of the Bailey	Henry Tong	1 episode
1998	Rex the Runt	Wallace	1 episode
2001	Holby City	Lionel Davis	1 episode
2004	Doctors	Arthur Weatherill	1 episode
2009	Kingdom	Cyril	1 episode
2010	Wallace and Gromit's World of Invention	Wallace	Voice (Final television role)

=== Video games ===
Year	Title	Role	Notes
2003	Wallace & Gromit in Project Zoo	Wallace	
2005	Wallace & Gromit: The Curse of the Were-Rabbit	Wallace	

=== Radio ===
- Hercule Poirot's Christmas (1986) – Hercule Poirot. BBC Radio adaption.
- Living with Betty (1986) – Harold. Radio sitcom first broadcast on BBC Radio 2 in 1986
- The Adventure of the Norwood Builder (1993) – Jonas Oldacre

== Awards and nominations ==
Year	Award	Category	Work	Result	Ref.
1946	Korda Scholarship	Work	Training at the Royal Academy of Dramatic Art	Won	
1999	Unsung Heroes Award	Acting	Film and television	Won	
2005	Annie Award	Best Voice Acting in an Animated Feature Production	Wallace & Gromit: The Curse of the Were-Rabbit	Won	
2007	Order of the British Empire (OBE)		Services to Drama	Honoured	

== Sources ==
- Herbert, Ian, ed. (1972). Who's Who in the Theatre (fifteenth ed.). London: Sir Isaac Pitman and Sons. ISBN 978-0-273-31528-5.
- O'Donnell, Owen, ed. (1990). Contemporary Theatre, Film and Television. Volume 8. Detroit, New York and London: Gale. ISBN 0-8103-2071-1.
