= Upperthong =

Village in West Yorkshire, England

Coordinates: 53.5713°N 1.80633°W

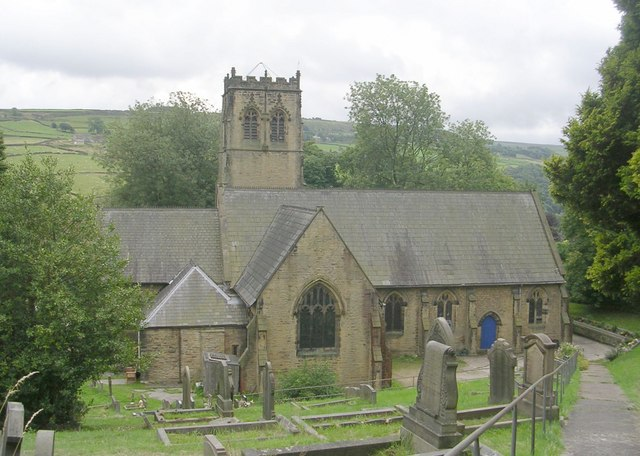
- St John's Parish Church

- Location within West Yorkshire
- Population: 1,938 (2019)
- OS grid reference: SE135085
- Civil parish: Holme Valley
- Metropolitan borough: Kirklees
- Metropolitan county: West Yorkshire
- Region: Yorkshire and the Humber
- Country: England
- Sovereign state: United Kingdom
- Post town: Holmfirth
- Postcode district: HD9
- Dialling code: 01484
- Police: West Yorkshire
- Fire: West Yorkshire
- Ambulance: Yorkshire
- UK Parliament: Colne Valley

Upperthong is a village approximately 807 feet (246 m) above sea level, in the civil parish of Holme Valley, in the Kirklees district, in West Yorkshire, England, near the town of Holmfirth, approximately 7 miles (11 km) south of Huddersfield. In 2005, Kirklees Council stated that the population of Upperthong was 1,116; by 2019, the figure was 1,938.

== History ==
The name Upperthong may derive from Old English 'uferra' (upper) + 'thwang' (narrow strip [of land]); since there is also a Netherthong, which is situated on lower ground than Upperthong, the names could designate lower and higher strips of land.

The village used to be in the wapentake of Agbrigg and Morley. Upperthong was formerly a township in the parish of Almondbury. In 1866, Upperthong became a separate civil parish. On 1 April 1921, the parish was abolished and merged with Holmfirth. In 1911, the parish had a population of 2279.

== Community ==
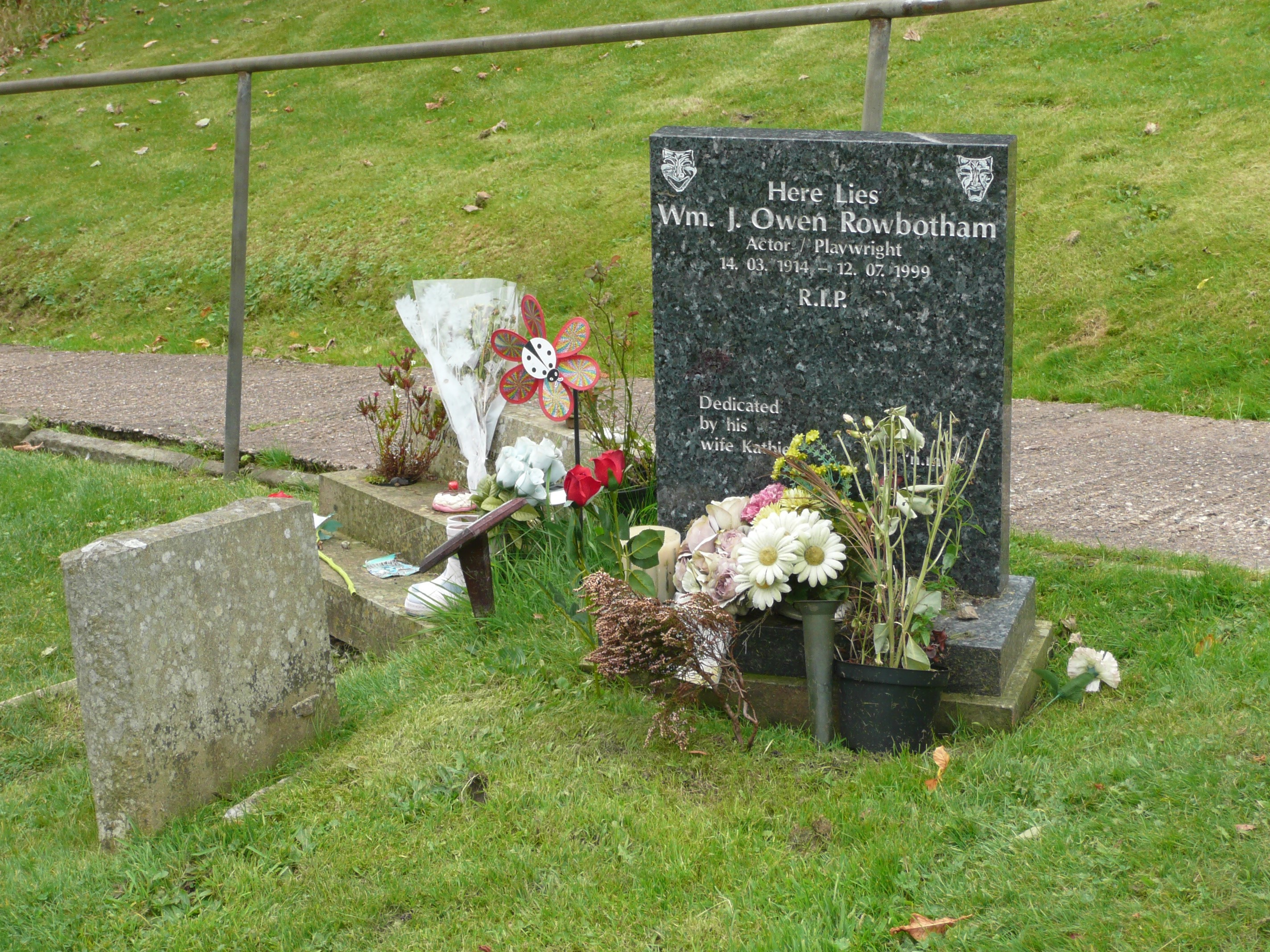
Bill Owen's grave in the churchyard of St John's Parish Church

Village amenities include the parish church of St John, a village hall, a cricket field, and a fish & chip restaurant and takeaway.

Upperthong is part of the Colne Valley constituency, which has been represented by Paul Davies of the Labour Party since the 2024 general election.

Upperthong Junior and Infant School, of 198 children aged 4 to 11, in 2006 received an above average overall score in the key stage 1 and 2 league tables. The school received an overall rating of Grade 2 (Good), for all areas and overall effectiveness in its latest full Ofsted report of 2012, and achieved 'Good' again in 2017.

Several roads in Upperthong form part of the southern section of National Route 68 of the National Cycle Network – the Pennine Cycleway. The route follows Upperthong Lane from its start in Holmfirth, and continues north westwards through the village, and out over the moor to Meltham.

Upperthong has a cricket team in the Huddersfield Cricket League, and a football team who play in Division 4 of the Huddersfield and District Association League. The village holds the World Welly Wanging Championships each year at the Village Gala on the last weekend in June.

Three actors from the BBC comedy Last of the Summer Wine, Peter Sallis who played Clegg, Bill Owen who played Compo and Bill Owen's son Tom Owen who played Tom Simmonite "Compo's son on the programme" are buried at the parish church.

According to Streetlist.co.uk, Upperthong is equidistant from the cities of Leeds, Sheffield and Manchester, 19.1 miles (30.8 km) away.
