= Crispian Sallis =

British art director

- Born: Timothy Crispian Sallis; 24 June 1959 (age 65)
- Occupation: Art director
- Years active: 1984–present
- Children: 2
- Parents: Peter Sallis (father); Elaine Usher (mother)

Timothy Crispian Sallis (born 24 June 1959) is a British art director. He was nominated for three Academy Awards in the category Best Art Direction for the films Aliens, Driving Miss Daisy and Gladiator. He is the son of actors Peter Sallis and Elaine Usher.

== Selected filmography ==
Year	Title
1984	Top Secret!
1985	A View to a Kill
1986	Aliens
1988	Off Limits
1989	Driving Miss Daisy
1990	Revenge
1990	Desperate Hours
1991	JFK
1994	The Browning Version
1994	The Jungle Book
1995	12 Monkeys
1997	Event Horizon
2000	Gladiator
2001	Hannibal
2005	Breakfast on Pluto
2006	It's a Boy Girl Thing
2015	Legend
2019	Waiting for the Barbarians
2020	The Rhythm Section
