= Tom Owen (actor) =

English actor (1949–2022)

- Born: Thomas William Stevenson Rowbotham; 8 April 1949; Marylebone, London, England
- Died: 7 November 2022 (aged 73)
- Resting place: St John the Evangelist Churchyard, Upperthong, West Yorkshire, England
- Occupation: Actor
- Years active: 1966–2019
- Spouse: Mary Moylan (m. 1978)
- Children: 2
- Father: Bill Owen

Thomas William Stevenson Rowbotham (8 April 1949 – 7 November 2022), known professionally as Tom Owen, was a British actor best known for playing Tom Simmonite in the BBC sitcom Last of the Summer Wine. He was the son of Bill Owen, who played William "Compo" Simmonite (the father of Tom Simmonite) in the show.

== Theatre ==
Owen trained as a student assistant stage manager at the Leatherhead Theatre in 1966. He worked extensively in repertory both as an actor and director. In 1969 Owen played Farley, in Goodbye, Mr. Chips a role first played by John Mills in the original version. He was a member of the Royal Shakespeare Company in its Broadway production of London Assurance. His performance as Krapp in Fiona Baddeley's production of Beckett's masterpiece Krapp's Last Tape was likened to those given by Michael Gambon, John Hurt and Harold Pinter. He appeared in the West End in the Lulu plays by Wedekind. He also starred in over twenty pantomimes.

== Television ==
Owen made his television debut in 1968 playing Bill Cowan in Southern TV's groundbreaking series Freewheelers appearing in fifty two episodes. Numerous television series followed including Tottering Towers, Wreckers at Deadeye, Horse in the House, The Piglet Files, The Hello Goodbye Man, Z-Cars, Upstairs Downstairs, The Bill, Minder, and Our Mutual Friend.

Owen's debut in Last Of The Summer Wine was in 1991 as a bank customer in the episode "Situations Vacant". Following the death of his father, Bill, who played Compo in 184 episodes over twenty-seven years, Tom joined Last of the Summer Wine as a regular in 2000 and stayed with the show appearing in 93 episodes until it ended in 2010.

Owen appeared with Kirk Douglas in the TV film Queenie, with Michael York in Great Expectations and David Hemmings in Unman, Wittering and Zigo.

== Film ==
Owen played school boy Farley in Goodbye Mr Chips (1969). He also appeared in two films which were released in 2018: The Bromley Boys and The Guernsey Literary and Potato Peel Pie Society.

== Personal life ==
Owen married Mary Bernadette Therese Moylan in 1978; they had two sons, James and William.

Owen died on 7 November 2022, at the age of 73. He is buried alongside his father and Last of the Summer Wine co-star Bill Owen at St John the Evangelist Churchyard, Upperthong, West Yorkshire.

== Television roles ==
Year	Title	Role
1968–1970	Freewheelers	Bill Cowan
1970	Wreckers at Deadeye	Zac
1971–1972	Tottering Towers	Dick
1972	Upstairs Downstairs	Stanley
1973	Harlequinade	Johnny
1973	The Onedin Line	Tom
1974	Hunter's Walk	Freddie
1976	Our Mutual Friend	Golly
1978	Hawkmoor	John Stedman
1979	Horse in the House	Jim Tynan
1983	Lytton's Diary	Mr Potter
1984	The Hello Goodbye Man	Rod Stewart
1989	Minder	Keith
1991	The Piglet Files	Harold
1991	Last of the Summer Wine	Bank Customer
1998	The Bill	Larcy
2000–2010	Last of the Summer Wine	Tom Simmonite
