= List of British comedy series by episode count =

This is a list of the longest-running British comedy series in the United Kingdom, which have reached or exceeded 100 episodes.

== List ==
Show name	Duration	Number of episodes	Ref
Pocoyo	2005–2010; 2016–present	321	
Last of the Summer Wine	1973–2010	295	
ChuckleVision	1987–2009	294	
Shaun the Sheep	2007–present	190	
Mr. Bean	2002–2019	182	
Harry Hill's TV Burp	2001–2012	161	
The Army Game	1957–1961	154	
Shameless	2004–2013	139	
Taskmaster	2015–present	214	
Birds of a Feather	1989–98; 2014–20	129	
Bodger & Badger	1989–1999	124	
Mike and Angelo	1989–2000	123	
My Family	2000–2011	120	
4 O'Clock Club	2012–2020	117	
Live at the Apollo	2004–present	109	
My Parents Are Aliens	1999–2006	106	
Not Going Out	2006–present	112	

== See also ==
- List of longest-running United States television series
- List of longest-running Australian television series
- List of longest-running Indian television series
- List of longest-running Philippine television series
- List of longest-running Spanish television series
- List of television series canceled after one episode
