= The Firm of Girdlestone (TV series) =

British television series

- Genre: Drama
- Based on: The Firm of Girdlestone by Arthur Conan Doyle
- Written by: C.E. Webber
- Directed by: Naomi Capon
- Starring: Andrew Cruickshank; Alan Dobie
- Country of origin: United Kingdom
- Original language: English
- No. of series: 1
- No. of episodes: 6

Production
- Producer: Naomi Capon
- Running time: 25 minutes
- Production company: BBC

Original release
- Network: BBC 1
- Release: 24 June – 29 July 1958

The Firm of Girdlestone is a British six-part television series originally broadcast on the BBC in 1958. It is an adaptation of the 1890 novel The Firm of Girdlestone by Arthur Conan Doyle.

== Cast ==
=== Main ===
- Andrew Cruickshank as John Girdlestone
- Alan Dobie as Ezra Girdlestone
- Elaine Usher as Kate Harston
- James Sharkey as Tom Dimsdale
- Joseph O'Conor as Major Tobias Clutterbuck
- Patricia Cree as Rebecca
- Leonard Sachs as Sigismund von Baumser

=== Other ===
- Wolfe Morris as Stevens
- Wensley Pithey as Dr Dimsdale
- Rachel Roberts as Mrs Scully
- Toke Townley as Gilray
- Colin Broadley as Jeb Parker
- Richard Coe as Perkins
- Bee Duffell as Mrs Jorrocks
- Shay Gorman as Harry
- Gawn Grainger as Robson
- Ann Heffernan as Mrs Dimsdale
- Geoffrey Hibbert as Jim
- Tim Hudson as Diamond miner
- Colin Jeavons as Farintosh
- Peter Lamsley as Diamond miner
- David Lander as Diamond miner
- David Ludman as Diamond miner
- Carol Marsh as Miss Timms
- Peter Morny as Waiter
- Walter Randall as Diamond miner
- Eric Thompson as Burt
- Sally Travers as Mrs Hudson
- Andre Van Gyseghem as James Harston

== Bibliography ==
- Baskin, Ellen . Serials on British Television, 1950-1994. Scolar Press, 1996.
