= Tottering Towers =

British TV comedy series (1971–1972)

- Genre: Family comedy
- Written by: Paddy Manning O'Brine
- Starring: William Mervyn
- Country of origin: United Kingdom
- Original language: English
- No. of series: 1
- No. of episodes: 13

Production
- Producer: Derek Bennett
- Running time: 25 minutes
- Production company: Thames Television

Original release
- Network: ITV
- Release: 20 October 1971 – 12 January 1972

Tottering Towers is a British comedy television series that originally aired on ITV from 1971 to 1972.

== Cast ==
- William Mervyn as Duke of Tottering
- Tim Barrett as 'Soapy' Cyril
- Robert Gillespie as Marmaduke
- Stacey Gregg as Daffy
- Avice Landone as Mrs. Pouncer
- Leon Lissek as Geko
- David Lodge as PC Poppy
- John Louis Mansi as 'Fingers' Fish
- Magda Miller as Mimi
- Tom Owen as Dick
- Patsy Rowlands as Miss Twitty
- David Stoll as Gabbige
- Talfryn Thomas as Prayer-book Perce
- Harry Towb as Hairy O'Hara
- Vic Wise as Benny the Nose

== Bibliography ==
- Maxford, Howard. Hammer Complete: The Films, the Personnel, the Company. McFarland, 2018.
