= Corda =

Corda may refer to:

== People ==
- August Carl Joseph Corda (1809–1849), Czech botanist and mycologist
- María Corda (1898–1976), Hungarian actress and novelist

== Other uses ==
- CORDA (UK), a consultancy company
- Corda, Ribeira Grande, a settlement in the island of Santo Antão, Cape Verde
- Corda River, a river in Maranhão state in northeastern Brazil
- Corda or strappado, a form of torture

== See also ==
- Sursum Corda (disambiguation)
- Korda, a surname
- Cordas, a surname
