= Sursum Corda (disambiguation) =

Sursum corda is the opening dialogue to the Preface of the Eucharistic Prayer or Anaphora in the liturgies of the Christian Church.

Sursum Corda may also refer to:

- Sursum Corda, Washington, D.C., a small neighborhood and housing cooperative in Washington, D.C.
- Sursum Corda (Italy), an early 20th-century Italian proto-fascist student movement
- Sursum corda (Elgar), an 1894 musical work by Edward Elgar
- Sursum Corda, Op. 13, a 1919 symphonic overture by Erich Wolfgang Korngold
- Sursum Corda, a co-educational social service organization at Loyola Marymount University

== See also ==
- Corda (disambiguation)
