= Bill Owen (actor) =

English actor (1914–1999)

Bill Owen MBE
- Born: William John Owen Rowbotham; 14 March 1914; Acton, Middlesex, England
- Died: 12 July 1999 (aged 85); Westminster, London, England
- Resting place: St John the Evangelist Churchyard, Upperthong, West Yorkshire, England
- Occupations: Actor, songwriter
- Years active: 1941–1999
- Spouses: Edith Stevenson (m. 1946; div. 1964) Kathleen O'Donoghue (m. 1977)
- Children: 2, including Tom Owen

William John Owen Rowbotham (14 March 1914 – 12 July 1999) was an English actor and songwriter. He is best known for portraying Compo Simmonite in the Yorkshire-based BBC comedy series Last of the Summer Wine for over a quarter of a century. He died on 12 July 1999, his last appearance on-screen being shown in April 2000.

== Early life and career ==
Born at Acton Green, London to a working-class family (his father a staunchly left-wing tram driver), Owen made his first film appearance in 1945, but did not achieve lasting fame until 1973, when he took the co-starring role of William "Compo" Simmonite in the long-running British sitcom Last of the Summer Wine. Compo is a scruffy working-class pensioner, often exploited by the bossy characters played by Michael Bates, Brian Wilde, Michael Aldridge and Frank Thornton for dirty jobs, stunts and escapades, while their indomitably docile friend Norman Clegg, played by Peter Sallis, follows and watches with a smirk. He wore a woollen hat and spent much of his time lusting after dowdy housewife Nora Batty. The series, starting in 1973 and finishing in 2010, became the world's longest-running comedy series. Owen became an icon and featured in episodes for 26 years, until his death.

Owen served in the Royal Army Ordnance Corps during World War II, where he was injured in an explosion during a battle training course. His first screen role was in the 1941 short Tank Patrol, produced by the Ministry of Information. He was to appear in a number of similar films during the remainder of the War. During the 1960s, Owen had a successful second career as a songwriter, with compositions including the hit "Marianne", recorded by Cliff Richard. At this time he also collaborated with songwriter Tony Russell on the musical The Matchgirls about the London matchgirls strike of 1888. Owen also recorded a novelty song with Kathy Staff in 1983 called "Nora Batty's Stockings".

He was "a spry, dry little gnome of a Ko-Ko" for Sadler's Wells Opera in their 1962 Christmas season Mikado, "skimpering through the piece and playing conventional comic tricks". He co-starred as Spike Milligan's straight man in the West End hit Son of Oblomov in 1964.

Owen was a regular in the early Carry On films – Sergeant (1958), Nurse (1959), Regardless (1961) and Cabby (1963) and also featured in several Lindsay Anderson films including O Lucky Man! (1973) and In Celebration (1974). On TV had had regular roles playing Fred Cuddell in 13 episodes of Taxi! (1963); Sergeant Sam Short in 13 episodes of Copper's End (1971), George Edwards in 4 episodes of Emergency-Ward 10 and George Chambers (Thelma's father) in four episodes of Whatever Happened to the Likely Lads?. He also had a cameo appearance in Brideshead Revisited as Lunt, Charles Ryder's scout during his days at the University of Oxford.

== Personal life ==
Owen was a staunch socialist and supporter of the Labour Party. Peter Sallis described Owen as being "slightly to the left of Lenin" and said that his left-wing views contrasted so much with the right-wing opinions of Michael Bates that Last of the Summer Wine was almost not made because of their arguments. Owen was a founding member of the Keep Sunday Special campaign group, and president of Arts for Labour, a campaign group of performers linked to the Labour Party. He was appointed an MBE in 1977.

Owen was the subject of This Is Your Life in 1980 when he was surprised by Eamonn Andrews in Trafalgar Square.

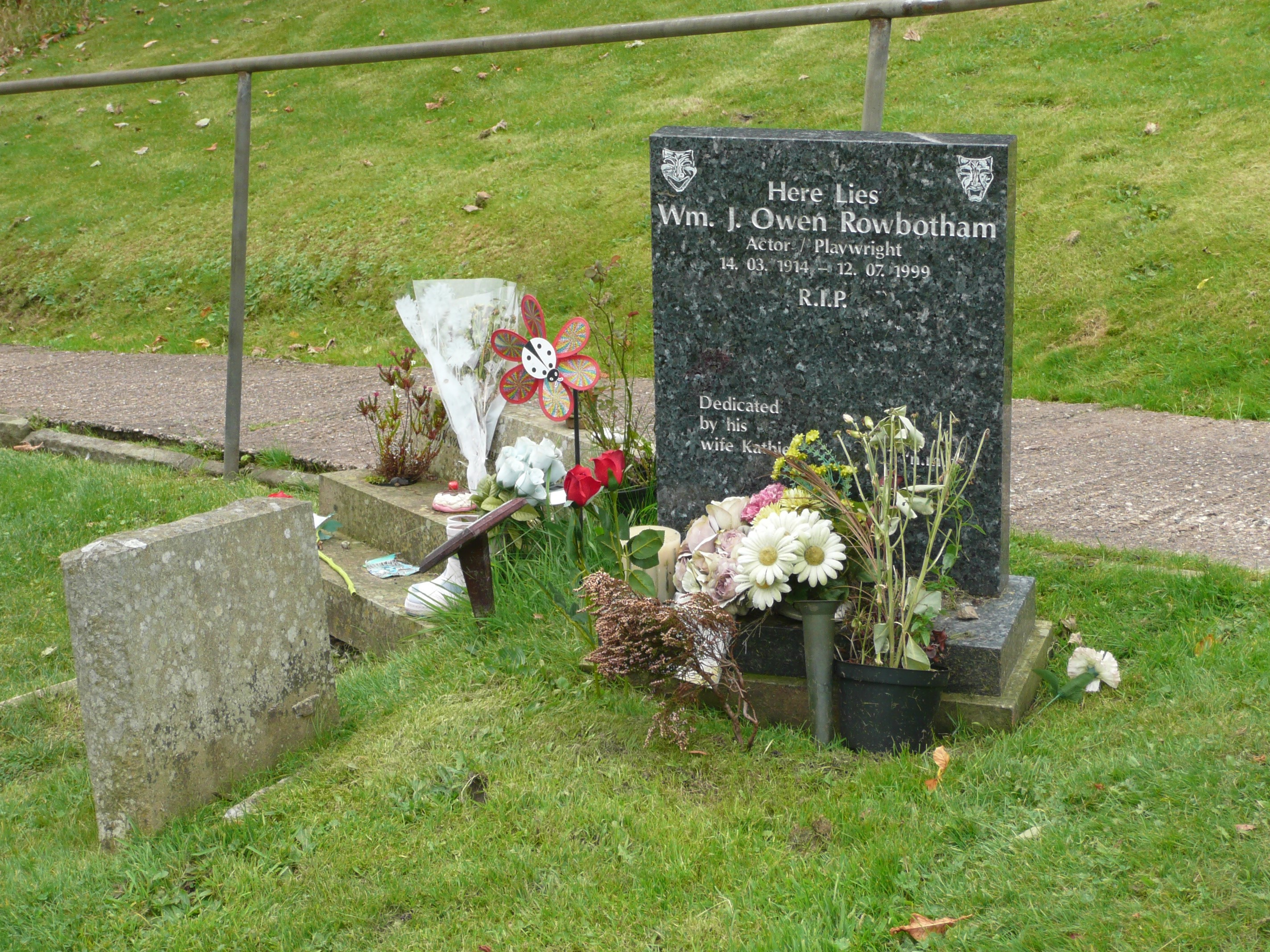
Bill Owen's grave in the churchyard of St John's Parish Church, Upperthong Lane, Holmfirth

== Illness and death ==
While filming the Last of the Summer Wine French special for the millennium of 2000, Owen fell ill but insisted on continuing despite being in pain; when he got back to England, he was confirmed as having pancreatic and bowel cancer.

Owen continued working until his death from pancreatic cancer in Westminster, London, on 12 July 1999. He is buried in the churchyard of St John's Parish Church, Upperthong, near his beloved town of Holmfirth in Yorkshire, the home of Last of the Summer Wine. His co-star Peter Sallis was buried next to him after his death aged 96 in June 2017, followed by the ashes of his son Tom Owen after his death aged 73 in November 2022.

== Selected television roles ==
Year	Title	Role	Notes
1950	The Girl Who Couldn't Quite...	Tramp	
1956	The Adventures of Robin Hood	Thief	
1956	The Bucccaneers	Captain Clip West	"Marooned" episode 15
1959	Dial 999	Freddy Haldane	
1963–1964	Taxi!	Fred Cuddell	
1964	Kiss Me, Kate	Gangster	BBC 2
1971	Coppers End	Sergeant Sam Short	
1971	Coronation Street	Charlie Dickinson	
1973–1974	Whatever Happened to the Likely Lads?	George Chambers	
1973–2000	Last of the Summer Wine	Compo Simmonite	185 episodes
1981	Brideshead Revisited	Lunt	Episode 1
1982	Tales of the Unexpected	Meakins	"The Moles" S5 E6

== Selected filmography ==
- Breathing Space (1943) – Songwriter (Uncredited)
- The Way to the Stars (1945) – 'Nobby' Clarke (as Bill Rowbotham)
- Perfect Strangers (1945) – (uncredited)
- School for Secrets (1946) – Paratroop Sergeant (as Bill Rowbotham)
- Dancing with Crime (1947) – Dave Robinson (as Bill Rowbotham)
- Holiday Camp (1947) – Bit Role (uncredited)
- When the Bough Breaks (1947) – Bill Collins
- Easy Money (1948) – Mr. Lee
- Daybreak (1948) – Ron
- My Brother's Keeper (1948) – Syd Evans
- The Weaker Sex (1948) – Soldier with Chicken
- Once a Jolly Swagman (1949) – Lag Gibbon
- Trottie True (1949) – Joe Jugg
- Diamond City (1949) – Pinto
- The Girl Who Couldn't Quite (1950) – Tim
- The Astonished Heart (1950) – Mr. Burton (uncredited)
- Hotel Sahara (1951) – Private Binns
- The Story of Robin Hood and His Merrie Men (1952) – Stutely
- The Square Ring (1953) – Happy Burns
- There Was a Young Lady (1953) – Joe
- A Day to Remember (1953) – Shorty Sharpe
- The Rainbow Jacket (1954) – Sam
- The Ship That Died of Shame (1955) – Birdie
- Not So Dusty (1956) – Dusty Grey
- Davy (1958) – Eric
- Carve Her Name with Pride (1958) – N.C.O. Instructor
- Carry On Sergeant (1958) – Corporal Bill Copping
- Carry On Nurse (1959) – Percy 'Perc' Hickson
- The Shakedown (1960) – David Spettigue
- The Hellfire Club (1961) – Martin
- Carry On Regardless (1961) – Mike Weston
- On the Fiddle (1961) – Corporal Gittens
- Carry On Cabby (1963) – Smiley Sims
- The Masque of the Red Death (1964) – Male Dancer (uncredited)
- The Secret of Blood Island (1964) – Bludgin
- Georgy Girl (1966) – Ted
- The Fighting Prince of Donegal (1966) – Officer Powell
- Headline Hunters (1968) – Henry
- O Lucky Man! (1973) – Supt. Barlow / Insp. Carding
- In Celebration (1975) – Mr. Shaw
- The Comeback (1978) – Mr. B
