= Vacuum variable capacitor =

A vacuum variable capacitor is a variable capacitor which uses a high vacuum as the dielectric instead of air or other insulating material. This allows for a higher voltage rating than an air dielectric using a smaller total volume. However, many dielectrics have higher breakdown field strengths than vacuum: 60-170 MV/m for teflon, 470-670 MV/m for fused silica and 2000 MV/m for diamond, compared with 20-40 MV/m for vacuum. There are several different designs in vacuum variables. The most common form is inter-meshed concentric cylinders, which are contained within a glass or ceramic vacuum envelope, similar to an electron tube. A metal bellows is used to maintain a vacuum seal while allowing positional control for the moving parts of the capacitor.

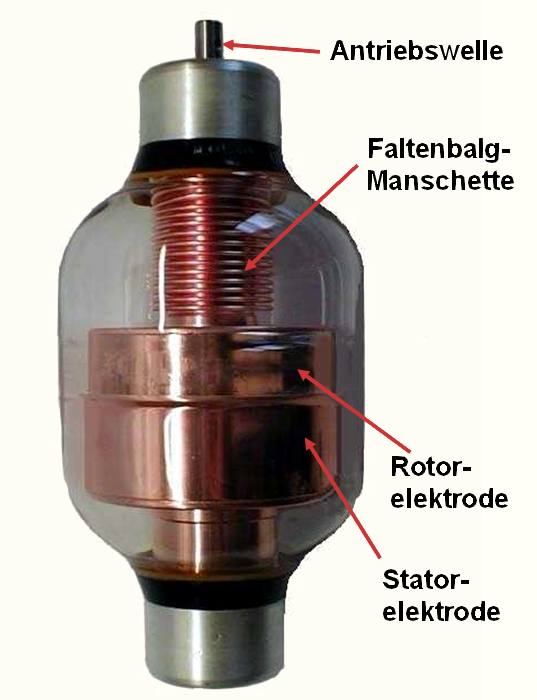
A vacuum variable capacitor

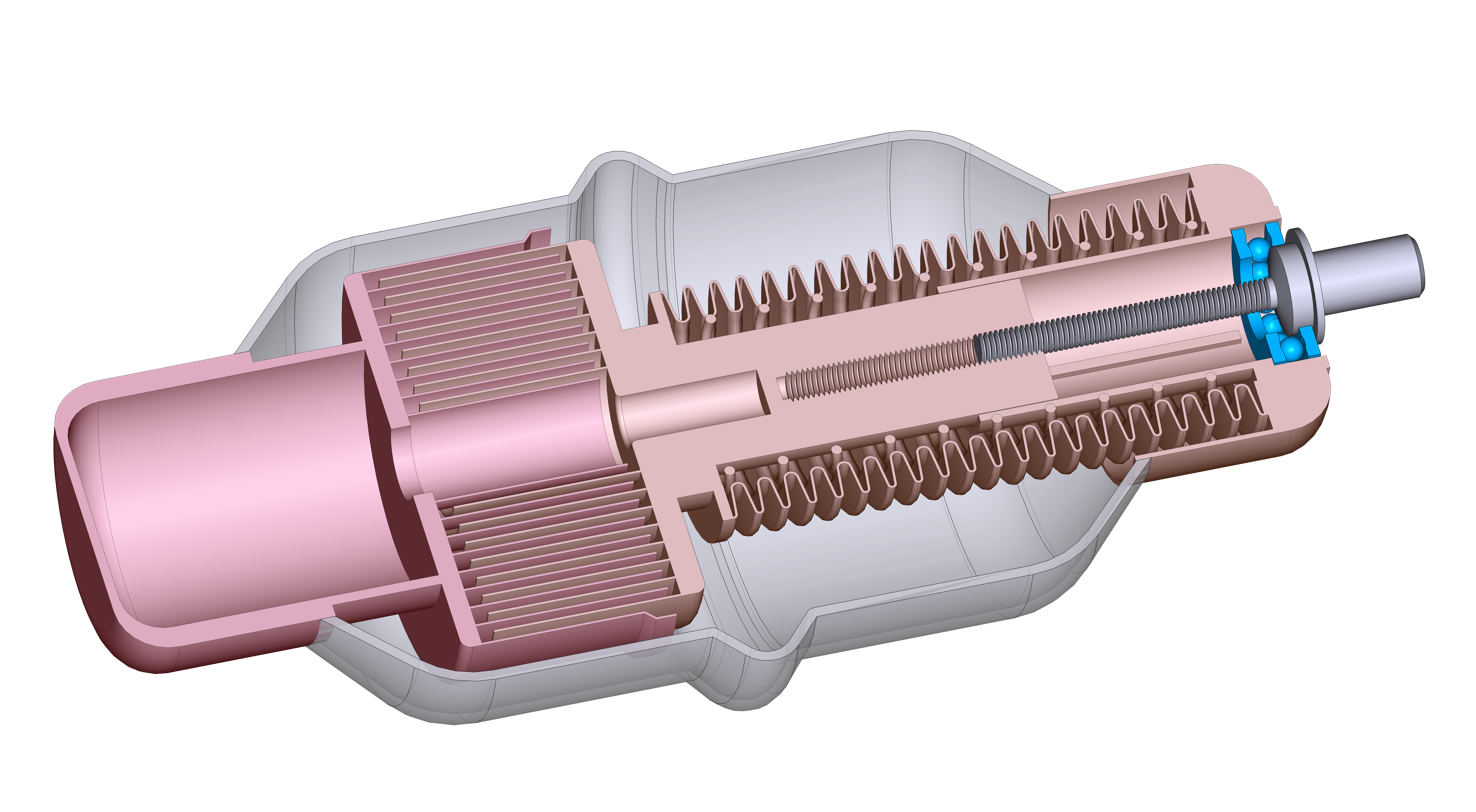
KP1-4 vacuum variable capacitor, set to the maximum, 500 pF

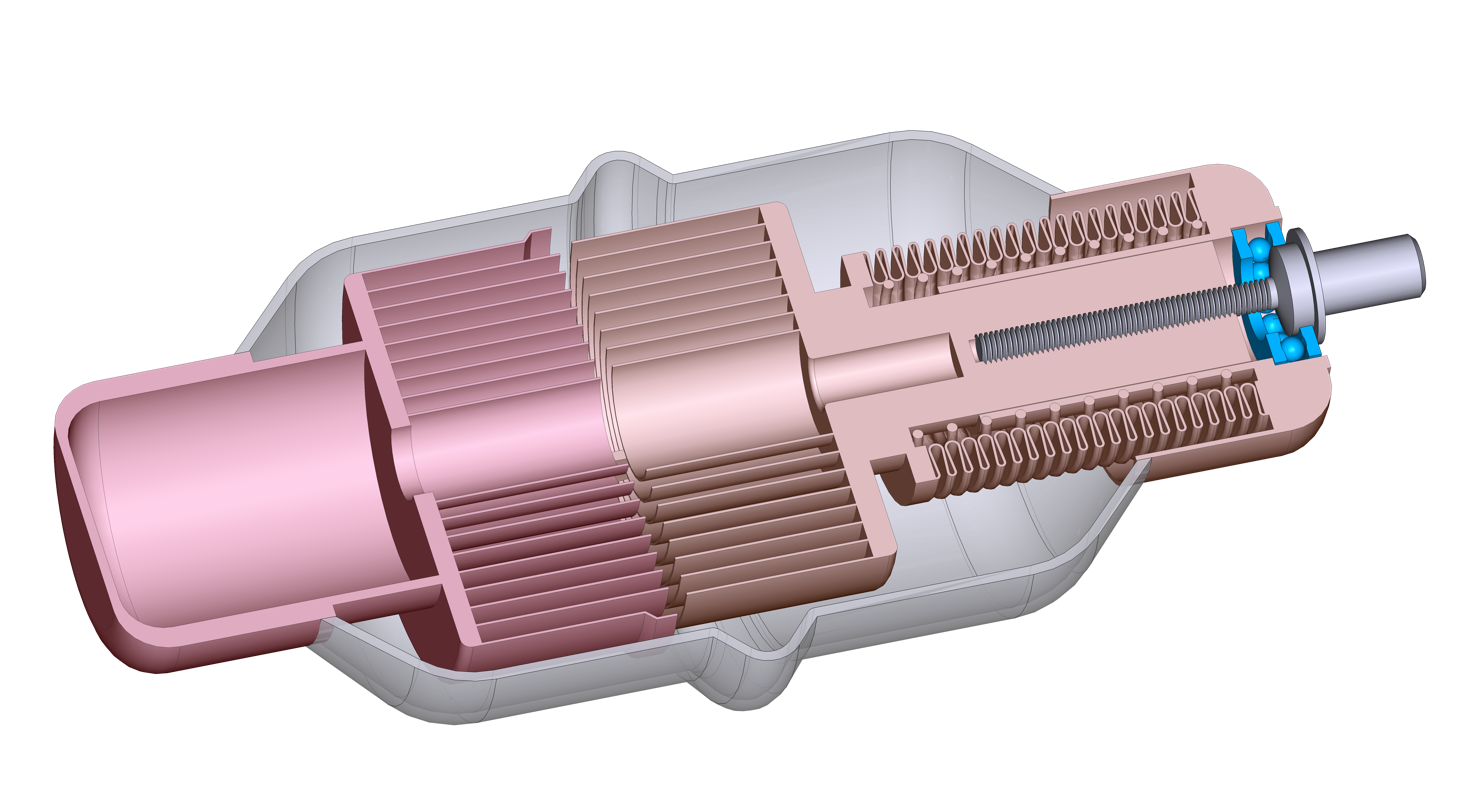
KP1-4 vacuum variable capacitor, set to the minimum, 10 pF

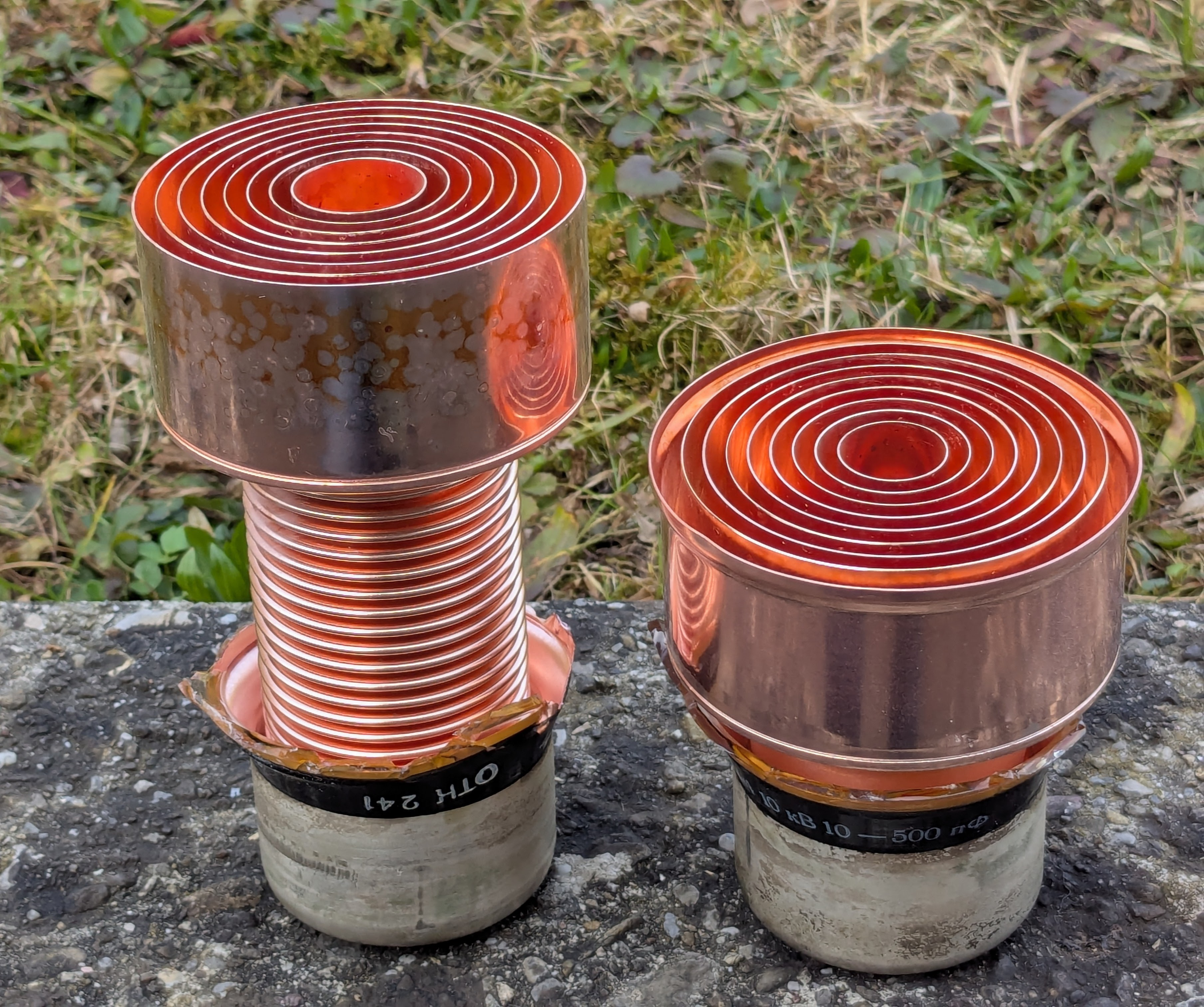
Internal structure and electrode arrangement of the KP1-4

== Invention ==
Jo Emmett Jennings created the first practical vacuum variable capacitor after he founded his Jennings Radio Manufacturing Company in 1940. Commercial products have been available since 1942.

== Applications ==
Vacuum variable capacitors are commonly used in high-voltage applications: 5000 volts (5 kV) and above. They are used in equipment such as high-powered broadcast transmitters, amateur radio RF amplifiers and large antenna tuners. Industrially they are used in plasma generating equipment, for dielectric heating, and in semiconductor manufacturing. The main applications today are RF plasmas of 2 to 160 MHz where the vacuum capacitor is used as the impedance variation part in an automatic matching network in the fabrication of chips and flat panel displays.

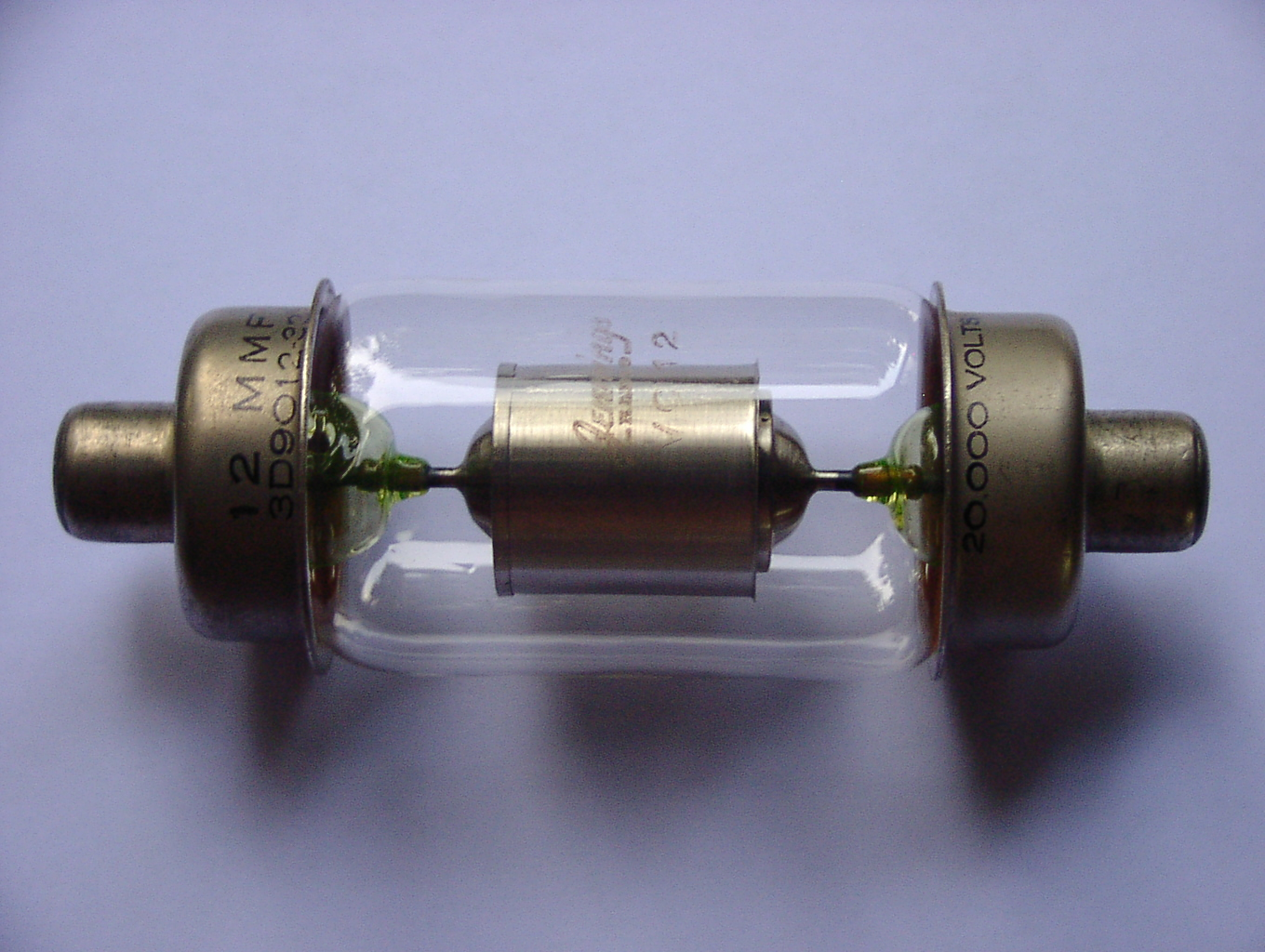
A 12 pF 20 kV fixed vacuum capacitor

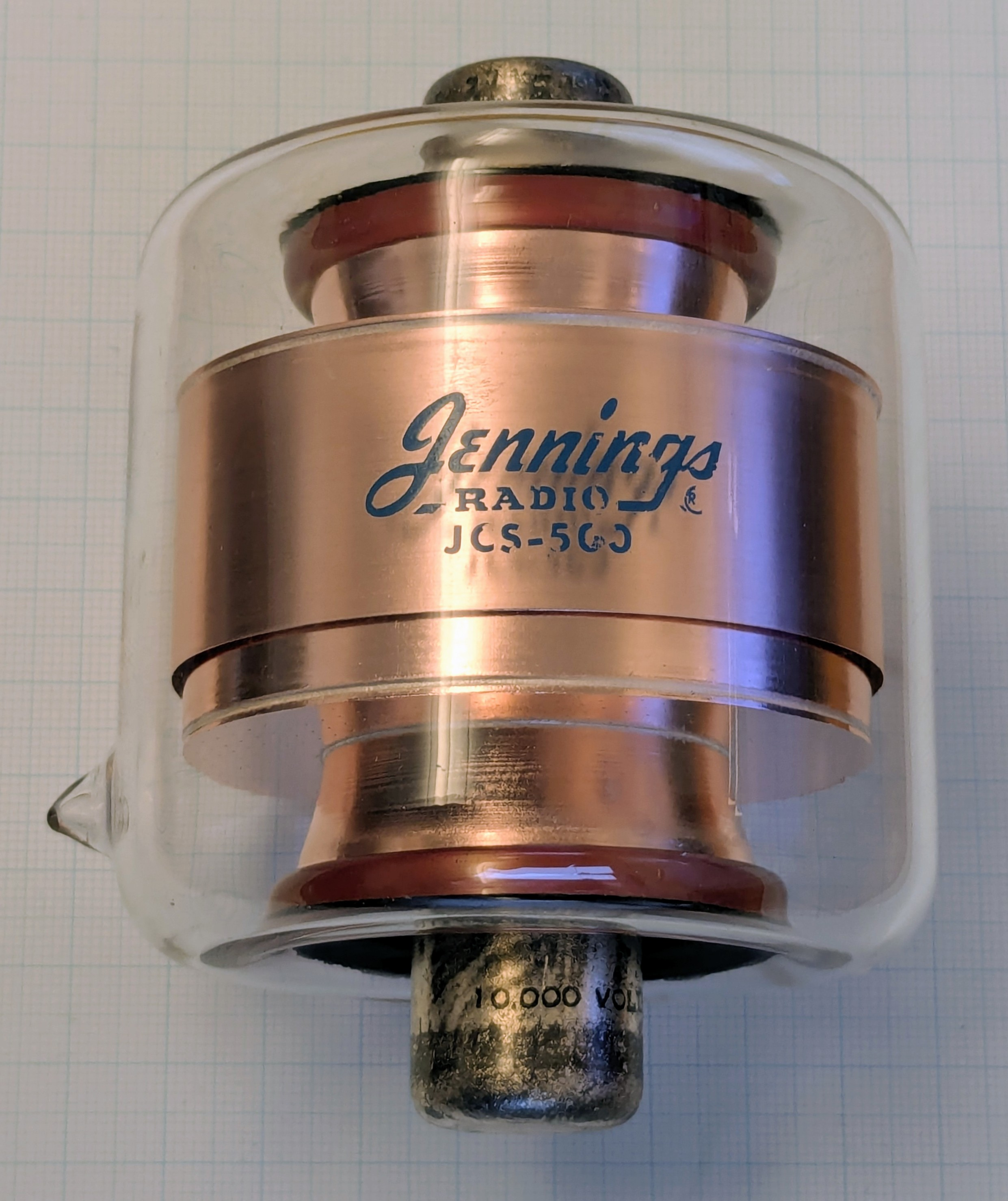
A fixed-value vacuum capacitor, 500 pF, 4.2 kVrms, 80 Arms

Other variations of vacuum capacitors include fixed-value capacitors, which are designed very much like the variable versions with the exception that the adjustment mechanism is omitted.

== Comparison ==
When compared to other variable capacitors, vacuum variables tend to be more precise and more stable. This is due to the vacuum itself. Because of the sealed chamber, the dielectric constant remains the same over a wider range of operating conditions. With air variable capacitors, the air moving around the plates may change the value slightly; often it is not much but in some applications it is enough to cause undesirable effects.

Vacuum variable capacitors are generally more expensive than air variable capacitors. This is primarily due to their design and the materials used. Although most use copper and glass, some may use other materials such as ceramics and metals such as gold and silver. Vacuum variables also vary in adjustment mechanisms.
