= Cordas =

Cordas may refer to:

- Darko Čordaš (born 1976), Croatian football player
- Dino 7 Cordas (1918–2006), Brazilian guitar player
- Leon Còrdas (1913–1987), Occitan playwright
- A.C. Cordas, designer of the Steinruck SCS-1, a glider

== See also ==
- Corda (disambiguation)
