= Norman Clegg =

Fictional character from Last of the Summer Wine

- Last of the Summer Wine character
- First appearance: "Of Funerals and Fish" (Comedy Playhouse); 4 January 1973
- Last appearance: "How Not to Cry at Weddings"; 29 August 2010
- Created by: Roy Clarke
- Portrayed by: Peter Sallis (Last of the Summer Wine); David Fenwick (First of the Summer Wine)

In-universe information
- Nickname: Cleggy
- Occupation: Lino salesman (retired)
- Family: David Clegg (father); Violet Clegg (mother)
- Spouse: Edith Clegg (1940–1971; deceased)
- Relatives: Arthur Clegg (uncle); Cyril Clegg (uncle); Annie Clegg (aunt); Bradley (cousin); Wayne (cousin's grandson); Aubrey (cousin-in-law)

Norman Clegg, often nicknamed Cleggy, is a fictional character from the world's longest-running sitcom, Last of the Summer Wine. He is the only character to appear in every episode of the programme.

== Fictional character biography ==
=== Early life ===
Norman Clegg was born in 1921, the only child of builder and decorator David Clegg (also Peter Sallis) and his rather volatile wife Violet (Maggie Ollerenshaw). David, a war veteran, was very quiet and rarely interacted with his family, much to the concern of Norman, who thought his father didn't like him. (Violet felt the same way.) His mother was extremely overprotective of her son, and panicked when he was walked home once by a girl a year older than him.

=== Later years ===
Norman married Edith in the early 1940s; she died in 1971. In earlier episodes especially, Norman reminisced about his wife and her traits; how she hated his camping phase and about her sharp tongue. She was mentioned numerous times throughout the series and Clegg was shown to visit her graveside in the pilot episode. He once stated that he wasn’t attracted to her and their marriage sort of "just happened"; he explains it put him off women for life. In the first series- where he had a rather sharper, more cynical, sometimes abrasive personality- Clegg described his dislike of driving and his wife's "passion, late in life" for a Hillman car, affectionately (if somewhat uncharacteristically) uttering "God rest the silly bitch". After her death and being made redundant from his job as a lino salesman, he began to hang around with his old school-friends Compo Simmonite (Bill Owen) and Cyril Blamire (Michael Bates). They divided their time between the local library, pubs, eating at Sid (John Comer) and Ivy's Café and devising adventurous exploits to stave off boredom. Clegg was a cynic and more critical of the schemes than the others, preferring to take a back seat and casually watch, for example, an antic involving three meat pies, Compo, Cyril and Sid, an alloy spoon and a very angry Ivy (Jane Freeman).

Norman enjoys watching Compo and the third man, usually Foggy (Brian Wilde), arguing or trading insults such as "great long dollop" (Sid to Foggy), "Elsie" (Compo to Foggy), "Rex Hammond" (Compo to Cyril) and "short scruffy one" (Foggy to Compo). He often goes along with the ideas just to please the others. Clegg aims for a relaxing, peaceful retirement following his redundancy, but is continually involved in the schemes of Foggy and the others. Happy just to read alone in his cosy home, he also finds enjoyment in pondering some of the simpler things in life, such as Sid's skirting board and the price of beer. He is also so anxious and shy that he wears several layers of clothing: vest/long johns, shirt, jumper/sweater, waistcoat/suit vest, jacket/sport coat, and finally a plastic mac, which he just carries when it's not windy or raining. He is also the only one of the trio with a driving licence and finds himself pressured into driving on the very rare occasions that they are walking about locally and manage to find a vehicle with no driver. This invariably results in a panic attack for Clegg, who fumbles about uncontrollably with the gears and pedals, limiting his speed to about 3 mph (5 km per hour) (which is just to his liking). In the series 1 episode "The New Mobile Trio", he decides that the trio should buy a car, but shortly after they bought one he accidentally crashed it into a passing tractor. Because Clegg was at first optimistic about the idea of driving, it is likely that incidents such as this triggered his fear of driving. He mentions, in series 21, that he no longer holds a driving licence and is proud and relieved as a result. He sometimes could also be quite superstitious as in one episode he believed that he, Compo and Foggy had aroused the anger of an old Yorkshire god named Earnshaw. In the episode where Compo is buried, he believed that Compo's ghost shouted "Goodbye" back to him when in fact it was a random passer-by that had overheard him.

Clegg was the sounding-board for Compo's glee and the third man's authority, and was often instrumental in pointing out the pitfalls concealed within the schemes of the third man. Clegg is also well known for his philosophical asides and sharp wit, which have received acclaim for interjecting intellectual material into the series. In early episodes, Clegg was much more opinionated and courageous. Sometimes he was shown to be the leader of the trio in the earlier episodes (such as taking them on a camping trip in the hills one stormy night). Within a few years, he became more quiet and laid-back (although he was still seen to relish the odd practical joke or escapade), and the group came to be led by Foggy and the "third men" who succeeded him. During the earlier episodes, he was also less awkward and more talkative when interacting with women, which is shown when he made an offhand remark about Nora Batty's father (which she overheard). When Cyril commented on how brave it was to do so, he claimed to have had "years of marital combat experience". He eventually became more nervous when interacting with the local ladies. Despite his neurosis and frequent scepticism, Clegg was the one who had the most average lifestyle and, particularly in earlier episodes, is portrayed as the most friendly out of the trio.

From series 9 onwards, Clegg's neighbour Howard (Robert Fyfe) often involved him in his risky schemes to have an affair with Marina (Jean Fergusson) without wife Pearl (Juliette Kaplan) finding out. As a result, Clegg is often shown to be afraid of Pearl (though, when not involved in any of Howard's schemes, they are both shown to be friendly with each other) and as a result, he is always reluctant to help or get involved. It is revealed, in the episode "A Sidecar Named Desire", that he'd previously got trapped in a lift with Marina and she cuddled him for warmth, which left him frightened of her. Because Howard frequently sends Clegg in his place to deliver messages to Marina, this leads the latter into believing that Clegg is interested in her and, throughout the series, she is shown to have a soft spot for him, often addressing him upon meeting as "Norman Clegg that was". However, one notable exception where Clegg grows to enjoy Marina's company is when she ended up having lunch with him and Truly on his birthday, much to the jealousy and anger of Howard. Clegg is also terrified of going near Auntie Wainwright (Jean Alexander)'s shop because she always manages to sell him something that he does not want, such as an old rusty barbeque in one episode; he also believes she is a witch or a vampire, and often remarks he should be going into the shop with "a crucifix and a piece of garlic".

Throughout most of the series he was generally closer to Compo than the "third men" and the two of them often got enjoyment out of the mishaps of Cyril, Seymour and Foggy. Clegg was the most devastated by Compo's death in 2000 and felt guilty about not giving him a proper send-off straight away. Subsequently, he became closer to Truly (Frank Thornton).

With the introduction of Alvin Smedley (Brian Murphy) to the main trio, making them a quartet, Clegg's roles were gradually reduced, from series 25 onwards, due to Peter Sallis's health (though there are episodes where he does play a major role). After Keith Clifford departed the show following series 27, the quartet became a trio again; however, Clegg's role continued to decrease and most episodes focused on Alvin and Entwistle's schemes. In the two final series, both Clegg and Truly became official secondary characters, as Sallis and Frank Thornton were now over 85, leading to complications over insurance on location filming, so his role in the trio was filled by Entwistle (Burt Kwouk). Prior to this, Entwistle had filled Clegg's role on a number of occasions.

Despite being a widower, Clegg seldom refers to his wife, Edith, in later series. In an early exchange with Nora Batty, it's hinted that Edith was of a similar vein to Nora and Ivy, but this was never elaborated on. Throughout the series, she is only referred to by name once. It is mentioned that she has a brother, whom Clegg champions for "keeping well away".
