= Korda =

Korda is a surname. Notable people with the surname include:

- Alberto Korda (1928–2011), Cuban photographer
- Alexander Korda (1893–1956), Hungarian-born British film director and producer
- Chris Korda (born 1962), American musician; son of Michael
- Dezső Korda (1864–1919), Hungarian engineer, inventor of rotary capacitor
- Jessica Korda (born 1993), American golfer; daughter of Petr
- Michael Korda (born 1933), English-born American editor and writer
- Nelly Korda (born 1998), American golfer; daughter of Petr
- Paul Korda (1948-2020), English musician and actor
- Petr Korda (born 1968), Czech tennis player
- Sebastian Korda (born 2000), American tennis player; son of Petr
- Serena Korda (born 1979), British artist
- Vincent Korda (1897–1979), Hungarian-born British art director
- Zoltán Korda (1895–1961), Hungarian-born film director

== See also ==
- Korda Studios (Hungary)
- Corda (disambiguation)
