= Elaine Usher =

English actress

- Born: 8 June 1932; Bournemouth, Hampshire, England
- Died: 1 January 2014 (aged 81); Richmond, London, England
- Occupation: Actress
- Years active: 1951–1963
- Spouse: Peter Sallis (m. 1957; div. 1965)
- Partner: Peter Sallis (1965–1999)
- Children: Crispian Sallis

Elaine Usher (8 June 1932 – 1 January 2014) was an English actress. She was known for her work on British television.

== Personal life ==
Usher married actor Peter Sallis at St. John's Wood Church in London on 9 February 1957. However, it was a turbulent relationship: Usher left Sallis sixteen times until they eventually divorced in 1965. They eventually reconciled and continued to live together until 1999; Usher remained close to Sallis until her death in 2014. They had one son, Crispian Sallis (born 1959), who works as a film set designer.

== Death ==
Usher died on 1 January 2014 in Richmond, London, England, at the age of 81.

== Television and filmography ==
=== Television ===
Year	Title	Role
1951	When We Are Married	Nancy Holmes
1956	Nom-de-Plume	Miss Barton
1957	The Goose Girl	Princess Lucinda
1958	Television World Theatre	Kaia Fosli
1958	The Firm of Girdlestone	Kate Harston
1959	Less Than Kind	Rose
1960	ITV Play of the Week	Mabel Dancy
1960–1962	No Hiding Place	Mrs Mason
1963	It Happened Like This	Mary Somerville
