= Dezső Korda =

Hungarian mechanical engineer and inventor

Dezső Korda (French: Désiré or Desider Korda) (8 January 1864 – 1 April 1919) was a mechanical engineer born in Kisbér, Hungary. Korda finished his education in 1885 at the Budapest, in Royal Joseph Technical University (present-day Budapest University of Technology and Economics). After that he worked as electrical engineer in France and Switzerland. During the First World War Korda was a lecturer at ETH Zurich for wireless telegraphy and high frequency machines.

He invented the variable capacitor with air dielectric, and received in Germany a patent for invention on 13 December 1893.

He was awarded the French Legion of Honour in 1907 for his scientific achievements.
