= Last of the Summer Wine =

British TV sitcom (1973–2010)

- Genre: Sitcom; Comedy; Drama; Slice of life; Light entertainment
- Created by: Roy Clarke
- Written by: Roy Clarke
- Directed by: Alan J. W. Bell; Sydney Lotterby; Ray Butt; Martin Shardlow
- Starring: Russ Abbot; Michael Aldridge; Jean Alexander; Trevor Bannister; Michael Bates; Dora Bryan; Tony Capstick; Keith Clifford; John Comer; Louis Emerick; Jean Fergusson; Jane Freeman; Robert Fyfe; Joe Gladwin; Mike Grady; Thora Hird; Juliette Kaplan; Ken Kitson; Burt Kwouk; Stephen Lewis; Jonathan Linsley; Brian Murphy; Danny O'Dea; Bill Owen; Tom Owen; Peter Sallis; Kathy Staff; Josephine Tewson; Sarah Thomas; Frank Thornton; Julie T. Wallace; Gordon Wharmby; June Whitfield; Brian Wilde; Norman Wisdom; Barbara Young
- Theme music composer: Ronnie Hazlehurst
- Opening theme: "The Last of the Summer Wine"
- Ending theme: "The Last of the Summer Wine"
- Composers: Ronnie Hazlehurst; Nigel Hess; Jim Parker
- Country of origin: United Kingdom
- Original language: English
- No. of series: 31
- No. of episodes: 295 (list of episodes)

Production
- Producers: Alan J W Bell; Sydney Lotterby; James Gilbert; Bernard Thompson; Robin Nash
- Production locations: Holmfirth, West Yorkshire, England
- Cinematography: Pat O'Shea
- Running time: 30 minutes
- Production company: BBC

Original release
- Network: BBC1; BBC HD
- Release: 4 January 1973 – 29 August 2010

Related
- Comedy Playhouse; First of the Summer Wine

Last of the Summer Wine is a British sitcom set in Yorkshire created and written by Roy Clarke and originally broadcast by the BBC from 1973 to 2010. It premiered as an episode of Comedy Playhouse on 4 January 1973, and the first series of episodes followed on 12 November 1973. Alan J. W. Bell produced and directed all episodes of the show from late 1981 to 2010. The BBC confirmed on 2 June 2010 that Last of the Summer Wine would no longer be produced and the 31st series would be its last. Subsequently, the final episode was broadcast on 29 August 2010. Since its original release, all 295 episodes, comprising thirty-one series – including the pilot and all films and specials – have been released on DVD. Repeats of the show are broadcast in the UK on U&Gold, U&Yesterday, and U&Drama. It is also seen in more than 25 countries, including various PBS stations in the United States and on VisionTV in Canada. With the exception of programmes relaunched after long hiatuses, Last of the Summer Wine is the longest-running TV comedy programme in Britain and the longest-running TV sitcom in the world.

Last of the Summer Wine was set and filmed in and around Holmfirth, West Yorkshire, England, and centred on a trio of elderly men and their youthful misadventures; the members of the trio changed many times over the years. The original trio consisted of Bill Owen as the mischievous and impulsive Compo Simmonite, Peter Sallis as easy-going everyman Norman Clegg, and Michael Bates as uptight and arrogant Cyril Blamire. When Bates dropped out due to illness in 1976 after two series, the role of the third man of the trio was filled in various years up to the 30th series by the quirky war veteran Walter C. "Foggy" Dewhurst (Brian Wilde; who had two lengthy stints), the eccentric inventor and ex-headmaster Seymour Utterthwaite (Michael Aldridge), and former police officer Herbert "Truly of The Yard" Truelove (Frank Thornton). The men never seem to grow up, and they develop a unique perspective on their equally eccentric fellow townspeople through their stunts. Although in its early years the series generally revolved around the exploits of the main trio, with occasional interaction with a few recurring characters, over time the cast grew to include a variety of supporting characters and by later years the series was very much an ensemble piece. Each of these recurring characters contributed their own running jokes and subplots to the show, often becoming reluctantly involved in the schemes of the trio, or on occasion having their own, separate storylines.

After the death of Owen in 1999, Compo was replaced at various times by his real-life son, Tom Owen, as Tom Simmonite, Keith Clifford as Billy Hardcastle, a man who thought of himself as a direct descendant of Robin Hood, and Brian Murphy as the cheeky-chappy Alvin Smedley. Due to the age of the main cast, a new trio was formed during the 30th series, featuring somewhat younger actors. This format was used for the final two instalments of the show. This group consisted of Russ Abbot as Luther Hobdyke, known as Hobbo, a former milkman who fancied himself as a secret agent, Burt Kwouk as the electrical repairman, "Electrical" Entwistle, and Murphy as Alvin Smedley. Sallis and Thornton, both past members of the trio, continued in supporting roles alongside the new actors.

Although many felt that the show's quality had declined over the years, Last of the Summer Wine continued to receive large audiences for the BBC and was praised for its positive portrayal of older people and family-friendly humour. Many members of the royal family enjoyed the show. The programme was nominated for numerous awards and won the National Television Award for Most Popular Comedy Programme in 1999. There were twenty-one Christmas specials, three television films and a documentary film about the series. Last of the Summer Wine inspired other adaptations, including a television prequel, several novelisations, and stage adaptations.

== Production ==
=== History and development ===
In 1972, Duncan Wood, the BBC's Head of Comedy, watched a comedy on television called The Misfit. Impressed by writer Roy Clarke's ability to inject both comedy and drama into the sitcom, Wood offered Clarke the opportunity to write a sitcom. Clarke nearly turned the job down as he felt that the BBC's idea for a programme about three old men was a dull concept for a half-hour sitcom. Instead, Clarke proposed that the men should all be unmarried, widowed, or divorced and either unemployed or retired, leaving them free to roam around like adolescents in the prime of their lives, unfettered and uninhibited.

Clarke chose the original title, The Last of the Summer Wine, to convey the idea that the characters are not in the autumn of their lives but the summer, even though it may be "the last of the summer". BBC producers hated this at first and insisted that it remain a temporary working title, while the cast worried that viewers would forget the name of the show. The working title was changed later to The Library Mob, a reference to one of the trio's regular haunts early in the show. Clarke switched back to his original preference shortly before production began, a title that was shortened to Last of the Summer Wine after the pilot show.

The Last of the Summer Wine premiered as an episode of BBC's Comedy Playhouse on 4 January 1973. The pilot, "Of Funerals and Fish", received enough positive response that a full series was commissioned to be broadcast before the end of the year. Although the initial series did not do well in the ratings, the BBC ordered a second series in 1975.

=== Filming ===
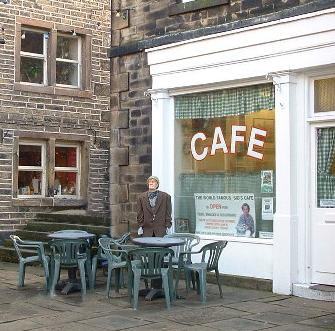
Sid's Café in Holmfirth, a regular filming location. The café has become a tourist destination on the strength of the series, and features a model of Compo outside for photographic purposes.

The site for the exterior shots of Last of the Summer Wine was, in part, suggested by television producer Barry Took, who was familiar with the area. Took had, in the 1950s, toured as a stand-up comic, often appearing at working men's clubs. One such appearance was at Burnlee Working Men's Club, a club in the small West Yorkshire town of Holmfirth, and Took saw Holmfirth's potential as the backdrop of a television show. Twenty years later, he returned to Holmfirth, where he filmed an episode of the BBC documentary series Having a Lovely Time, which turned out to be the highest rated episode of the show. When Took heard that James Gilbert and Roy Clarke were looking for a place with a centre surrounded by hills for their new television programme, he suggested the idea to Duncan Wood, who was at that time filming Comedy Playhouse. Gilbert and Clarke then travelled to Holmfirth and decided to use it as the setting for the pilot episode.

Though the exterior shots were nearly always filmed on location in Holmfirth and the surrounding countryside, the interior shots were, until the early 1990s, filmed in front of a live studio audience at BBC Television Centre in London. The amount of location work increased, however, as studio work became a drain on time and money. Under Alan J. W. Bell, Last of the Summer Wine became the first comedy series to do away with the live studio audience, moving all of the filming to Holmfirth. The episodes were filmed and then shown to preview audiences, whose laughter was recorded and then mixed into each episode's soundtrack to provide a laugh track and avoid the use of canned laughter.

The show used actual businesses and homes in and around Holmfirth, and Nora Batty's house, which is actually a Summer Wine themed holiday cottage where members of the public can stay in a replica of Nora Batty's home. Although this helped the Holmfirth economy and made it a tourist destination, tensions occasionally surfaced between Holmfirth residents and the crew. One such incident, regarding compensation to local residents, prompted producer Bell to consider not filming in Holmfirth any more. The situation escalated to the point that Bell filmed a scene in which Nora Batty put her house up for sale.

=== Crew ===
Every episode of Last of the Summer Wine was written by Roy Clarke. The Comedy Playhouse pilot and all episodes of the first series were produced and directed by James Gilbert. Bernard Thompson produced and directed the second series of episodes in 1975. In 1976, Sydney Lotterby took over as producer and director. He directed every episode of the third series, except for "The Great Boarding House Bathroom Caper" and "Cheering up Gordon", which formed a two-parter set in Scarborough. Lotterby directed two further series before departing the show in 1979. In 1981, Alan J. W. Bell took over as producer and director. Bell, in an effort to get each scene exactly right, was known for his use of more film and more takes than his predecessors and for using wider angles that feature more of the local Holmfirth landscape.

In 1983, Lotterby returned to the show at the insistence of Brian Wilde, who preferred Lotterby's use of tight shots focused on the trio as they talked rather than Bell's wide-angle scenes. Lotterby produced and directed one additional series before departing again the same year. Bell then returned to the show beginning with the 1983 Christmas special and produced and directed all episodes of the show to the end of the 31st series.

In 2008, Bell announced that he had quit as producer of Last of the Summer Wine. Citing differences with the BBC and his dislike of their indifference towards the series, Bell said, "I have now decided I will not do it again. I have had enough of the BBC's attitude." The announcement came following rumours initiated by Bell that the corporation would not commission another series of episodes following the 30th series and their indecision regarding a possible one-off special. However, on 26 June 2009, the BBC announced that it had recommissioned the show for a 31st series with Bell continuing as producer and director.

=== Music ===
"Last of the Summer Wine" by Ronnie Hazlehurst

Composer and conductor Ronnie Hazlehurst, who also produced themes for such series as Are You Being Served?, Yes Minister, and The Two Ronnies, created the theme for the show. The BBC initially disliked Hazlehurst's theme, feeling it was not proper for a comedy programme to have such mellow music. He was asked to play the music faster for more comedic effect but eventually his original slower version was accepted. A jauntier, upbeat version was played by a brass band in the episode "Full Steam Behind".

The theme, usually an instrumental work, featured lyrics three times. The 1981 Christmas special, "Whoops", had two verses of lyrics written by Roy Clarke that were performed over the closing credits. The 1983 film, Getting Sam Home, used those verses with an additional two, and played them over the opening credits. Another altered version was sung during Compo's funeral in the 2000 episode "Just a Small Funeral". Bill Owen also wrote a different version of the lyrics but this version was never used during an episode of the show.

Composing the score for each episode until his death in 2007, Hazlehurst spent an average of ten hours per episode watching scenes and making notes for music synchronisation. He then recorded the music using an orchestra consisting of a guitar, harmonica, two violins, a viola, cello, accordion, horn, double bass, flute, and percussion. The distinctive harmonica was played by Harry Pitch, who had featured in the 1970 one-hit-wonder "Groovin With Mr Bloe".

=== Ending ===
Despite numerous cast and production changes over the years, Last of the Summer Wine continued to be popular with viewers and was renewed year after year despite reports to the contrary. Rumours circulated as early as the 1980s that the BBC wanted to end the show and replace it with a new programme aimed at a younger audience. Its popularity made this decision hard to justify, however, since even repeats sometimes received ratings of as many as five million viewers per episode.

In December 2008, Alan J. W. Bell stated in an interview with The Daily Telegraph that the BBC had not yet commissioned a new series and that bosses at the network told him one would not be produced. Bell criticised this decision, stating that "millions still enjoy the series and the actors love being involved" and that it would be a terrible blow to the shops and businesses in Holmfirth who have come to depend on tourist revenue. The BBC denied these claims, saying that a decision had not yet been reached whether to commission another series or not.

It was confirmed on 26 June 2009 that a 31st series of 6 episodes had been commissioned for transmission in 2010. In June 2010 the BBC announced that it would not renew Last of the Summer Wine after its thirty-first series was broadcast during the summer of 2010. Tom Owen criticised the BBC for not permitting a special final episode. Roy Clarke, however, stated that he was fully aware this was the last series, and preferred the show to have a quiet ending. The final episode of the show, "How Not to Cry at Weddings", was subsequently broadcast on 29 August 2010. The final line, "Did I lock the door?", was said by Peter Sallis, the longest-serving actor.

== Characters and casting ==
The most famous of the Last of the Summer Wine trios: From left to right: Peter Sallis as Norman Clegg, Brian Wilde as Walter "Foggy" Dewhurst, and Bill Owen as William "Compo" Simmonite.

Initially, the only certain cast member for the show was Peter Sallis. Clarke had already collaborated on a few scripts with him and knew he wanted Sallis on the show. The character of Norman Clegg was created especially for Sallis, who liked the character and agreed to play him. He was soon joined by an actor he had previously worked with, Michael Bates as Cyril Blamire. James Gilbert wanted Bates as Blamire because of his reputation as a comedy actor, and Bates loved the role.

The joy of Bill Owen's Compo is not what he does with the words but where he takes the character beyond what's in the script. He did this in a physical manner. It was only when I saw Bill on screen that I realized what a wonderful physical clown he was.

— Roy Clarke on Bill Owen and Compo

Compo Simmonite was the last role to be cast in the original trio. Gilbert had seen film actor Bill Owen playing northern characters in the Royal Court Theatre and proposed to cast him as Compo. Clarke, who initially saw Owen as an archetypal cockney who could not play as solid a northern character as Compo was meant to be, recognised Owen's potential only after going to London for a read-through with him.

On-screen chemistry with existing players determined the later changes to the cast. Brian Wilde, Michael Aldridge and Frank Thornton each brought a sense of completion to the trio after the departure of the preceding third man. Tom Owen provided a direct link between his father and himself after the death of Bill Owen. Keith Clifford was added following three popular guest appearances on the show. Brian Murphy was chosen as Nora Batty's neighbour because of his work on George and Mildred, where he played the hen-pecked husband to a strong-willed woman.

In 2008, the BBC announced that Russ Abbot would join the cast in series 30 as a relatively youthful actor. Abbot was cast to allow Sallis and Thornton to reduce their role on the show to indoor scenes only. Abbot portrayed Luther "Hobbo" Hobdyke, who formed a new trio with Entwistle and Alvin. Entwistle, played by Burt Kwouk, had been a supporting character brought in to replace Wesley Pegden after the death of actor Gordon Wharmby, but his role on the show steadily increased in the previous two series.

The original cast of Last of the Summer Wine also included a handful of characters with whom the trio regularly interacted. Kathy Staff was chosen to play Compo's neighbour, Nora Batty. Gilbert was initially sceptical about casting Staff but changed his mind after she padded herself to look bigger and read from a scene between her character and Owen's. This group was rounded out by characters at two locations frequented by the trio: John Comer and Jane Freeman as Sid and Ivy, the quarrelling husband-and-wife owners of the local café; and Blake Butler and Rosemary Martin as Mr Wainwright and Mrs Partridge, the librarians having a not-so-secret affair. Butler and Martin, however, were dropped as major characters after the first series. According to Peter Sallis, Roy Clarke felt there was little more he could do with them.

Although the show initially focused on the trio and four to five supporting characters, the cast expanded over the years to include an ensemble of eccentric characters who rounded out the show. The biggest expansion came in 1985 when four characters from the stage adaptation of the show were brought over to the series proper: Howard (Robert Fyfe), Pearl (Juliette Kaplan), Marina (Jean Fergusson), and Ivy's nephew, "Crusher" Milburn (Jonathan Linsley). Further additions came the following year when the film Uncle of the Bride introduced Seymour's sister, Edie, played by veteran actress Thora Hird, and her family, who were brought over to the programme the following series. The only addition with no professional acting experience was the Holmfirth resident Gordon Wharmby, who performed so well during his audition as mechanic Wesley Pegden, that Alan J. W. Bell cast him in one episode. Pegden would make two more appearances before being brought in permanently as Edie's husband and Seymour's brother-in-law after positive audience reception, becoming a regular character starting in Uncle of the Bride. The increasingly large cast ensured a sense of continuity with the changing configuration of the trio, especially following the death of Bill Owen.

During the late 1970s, after the introduction of Foggy, the plots of Last of the Summer Wine moved away from the original dialogue-packed scenes in the pub and the library; guest actors were brought in to interact with the trio in new situations. Although many of these guest appearances lasted for only one episode, some led to a permanent role on the show, as in the cases of Gordon Wharmby, Thora Hird, Jean Alexander, Stephen Lewis, Dora Bryan, Keith Clifford, Brian Murphy, Josephine Tewson, June Whitfield, Barbara Young, and Trevor Bannister. Other noted guests on the programme included John Cleese, Ron Moody, Sir Norman Wisdom, Eric Sykes, Liz Fraser, Stanley Lebor, and Philip Jackson.

== Scenario ==
Last of the Summer Wine focused on a trio of older men and their youthful antics. The original trio consisted of Compo Simmonite, Norman Clegg, and Cyril Blamire. Blamire left in 1976, when Michael Bates fell ill shortly before filming of the third series, requiring Clarke to hastily rewrite the series with a new third man. The third member of the trio would be recast four times over the next three decades: Foggy Dewhurst in 1976, Seymour Utterthwaite in 1986, Foggy again in 1990, and Truly Truelove in 1997. After Compo died in 1999, his son, Tom Simmonite, filled the gap for the rest of that series, and Billy Hardcastle joined the cast as the third lead character in 2001. The trio became a quartet between 2003 and 2006 when Alvin Smedley moved in next door to Nora Batty, but returned to the usual threesome in 2006 when Billy Hardcastle left the show. The role of supporting character Entwistle steadily grew until the beginning of the 30th series, when he and Alvin were recruited by Hobbo Hobdyke, a former milkman with ties to MI5, to form a new trio of volunteers who respond to any emergency.

The trio explored the world around them, experiencing a second childhood with no wives, jobs, or responsibilities. They passed the time by speculating about their fellow townspeople and testing inventions. Regular subplots in the first decade of the show included: Sid and Ivy bickering over the management of the café, Mr Wainwright and Mrs Partridge having a secret love affair that everyone knows about, Wally trying to get away from Nora's watchful eye, Foggy's exaggerated war stories, and Compo's schemes to win the affections of Nora Batty.

The number of subplots on the show grew as more cast members were added. Regular subplots since the 1980s included: Howard and Marina trying to have an affair without Howard's wife finding out (a variation of the Wainwright-Partridge subplot of the 1970s), the older women meeting for tea and discussing their theories about men and life, the police officers trying not to work, Auntie Wainwright trying to sell unwanted merchandise to unsuspecting customers, Smiler trying to find a woman, Barry trying to better himself (at the insistence of Glenda), and Tom trying to stay one step ahead of the repo man.

== Episodes ==
Series	Episodes	Originally released	
Series	Episodes	First released	Last released
Pilot		4 January 1973	
1	6	12 November 1973	17 December 1973
2	7	5 March 1975	16 April 1975
3	7	27 October 1976	8 December 1976
4	9	9 November 1977	4 January 1978
5	8	18 September 1979	30 October 1979
6	8	4 January 1982	15 February 1982
7	8	30 January 1983	6 March 1983
8	7	10 February 1985	17 March 1985
9	15	1 January 1986	27 December 1987
10	7	16 October 1988	20 November 1988
11	8	15 October 1989	26 November 1989
12	11	2 September 1990	4 November 1990
13	7	18 October 1991	29 November 1991
14	10	25 October 1992	20 December 1992
15	10	24 October 1993	19 December 1993
16	9	1 January 1995	25 February 1995
17	11	3 September 1995	5 November 1995
18	11	20 April 1997	22 June 1997
19	11	4 January 1998	8 March 1998
20	10	18 April 1999	27 June 1999
21	11	2 April 2000	4 June 2000
22	10	1 April 2001	3 June 2001
23	11	6 January 2002	10 March 2002
24	11	5 January 2003	16 March 2003
25	11	8 February 2004	18 April 2004
26	11	13 March 2005	29 May 2005
27	11	5 March 2006	30 April 2006
28	10	15 July 2007	23 September 2007
29	11	22 June 2008	31 August 2008
30	11	19 April 2009	21 June 2009
31	6	25 July 2010	29 August 2010

A collage illustrating the different compositions of the main characters during Last of the Summer Wine's 37 year run. From left to right: Series 1–2, Series 3–8 & 12–18, Series 9–11, Series 19–21, Series 21, Series 22–25, Series 26–27, Series 28–29, Series 30–31.

Last of the Summer Wine is the longest-running comedy programme in Britain, and the longest running situation comedy in the world. Each series has between six and twelve episodes; most were thirty minutes in length, with some specials running longer. There were 295 episodes and 31 series between 1973 and 2010, counting the pilot, all episodes of the series, specials, and two films.

=== Specials ===
In 1978, the BBC commissioned a Last of the Summer Wine Christmas special instead of a new series. Titled "Small Tune on a Penny Wassail", it was broadcast on 26 December 1978. Other Christmas programmes followed in 1979 and 1981. The 1981 special, "Whoops", gained 17 million viewers and was beaten only by Coronation Street for the number one spot. Christmas shows were produced infrequently thereafter and sometimes were the only new episodes in years without an order for a new series. This happened often during the 1980s when Roy Clarke's commitment to Open All Hours prevented the production of a full series every year. The specials often included well-known guest stars such as John Cleese and June Whitfield.

The first New Year special, "The Man who Nearly Knew Pavarotti", was commissioned in 1994. The hour-long show was broadcast on 1 January 1995 and featured Norman Wisdom as a piano player who had lost the confidence to play. A second New Year programme was produced and broadcast in 2000 to celebrate the new millennium. It featured the second guest appearance by Keith Clifford and a guest appearance by Dora Bryan. Titled "Last Post and Pigeon", the show ran for sixty minutes and dealt with the trio's pilgrimage to visit World War II graves in France. Part of this special was shot on location in France. A third New Year show, titled "I Was a Hitman for Primrose Dairies", was broadcast on 31 December 2008 and introduced Hobbo and the new trio he formed with Entwistle and Alvin.

=== Films ===
In 1983, Bill Owen suggested to a newly returned producer Alan J. W. Bell that Roy Clarke's novelisation of the show should be made into a feature-length special. Other British sitcoms such as Steptoe and Son and Dad's Army had previously produced films made for the cinema, but the BBC were initially sceptical as they had never before commissioned a film based on a comedy programme for original broadcast on television. They nevertheless commissioned a ninety-minute film named Getting Sam Home, which was broadcast on 27 December 1983, and started a trend which would continue with other British sitcoms, including Only Fools and Horses.

Following the success of Getting Sam Home, a second film was made during 1985, and broadcast on 1 January 1986. Titled Uncle of the Bride, the film featured the introduction of Michael Aldridge as Seymour Utterthwaite, the new third man of the trio. The plot centred on the marriage of Seymour's niece, Glenda (Sarah Thomas), to Barry (Mike Grady). Also making her first appearance in the film was Thora Hird as Seymour's sister and Glenda's mother, Edie, as well as re-introducing Gordon Wharmby as Edie's husband Wesley, previously seen in three popular one-off appearances. The second film proved a success and all four new characters were carried over to the show beginning with the ninth series in 1986.

=== Documentaries ===
A documentary film was commissioned to celebrate the 25th anniversary of Last of the Summer Wine. Produced and directed by Alan J. W. Bell, it featured interviews with the majority of cast and crew members, outtakes from the show, and a behind-the-scenes look at production. Segments with Duncan Wood and Barry Took explained the origins of the show and how it came to be filmed in Holmfirth. The documentary was broadcast on 30 March 1997.

An updated version of the documentary was commissioned for the 30th anniversary of the series. Broadcast on 13 April 2003, this version featured an expanded interview with Brian Wilde and new interviews with Brian Murphy and Burt Kwouk.

In March 2022, Channel 5 aired a 67-minute special retrospective for their series "30 Years of Laughs". Cast, crew and celebrities paid tribute to the show.

=== DVD releases ===
In September 2002, Universal Playback (licensed by the BBC) began releasing boxed sets of episodes on DVD for region two. Each set contains two consecutive full series of episodes. The entire series is now available on home video, both in box sets with two series of episodes each, and in a complete collection which features every episode of Last of the Summer Wine plus the pilot, all films, and specials. The entire series is also available for region four from ABC. Like the region two releases, each box set contains two series.

Three "best of" collections as well as sets devoted to individual series have been released for region one. The first, simply titled Last of the Summer Wine, was released in 2003 and includes early episodes from the 1970s and 1980s. The second collection, titled Last of the Summer Wine: Vintage 1995, followed in 2004 and includes episodes from series seventeen and the 30th anniversary documentary. A 2008 release named Last of the Summer Wine: Vintage 1976 focuses on the third series of the show and includes bonus interviews with Peter Sallis, Brian Wilde, and Frank Thornton. Subsequently, every episode from the third to the twenty-seventh series has been released on DVD in Vintage collections, many including special features and interviews.

== Other adaptations ==
=== First of the Summer Wine ===
A spin-off prequel show, First of the Summer Wine, premiered on BBC1 in 1988. The new programme was written by Roy Clarke and used different actors to follow the activities of the principal characters from Last of the Summer Wine in the months leading up to World War II. Unlike its mother show, First of the Summer Wine was not filmed in Holmfirth. Period music was used instead of Ronnie Hazlehurst's score to create a more World War II era atmosphere. New supporting characters were added to those from Last of the Summer Wine. Peter Sallis and Jonathan Linsley were the only actors from the original series to appear in the spin-off: Sallis played the father of his own character from the original show and Linsley appeared during the second series as a different character.

The spin-off show could not build on its early success and was cancelled after two series totalling thirteen episodes in 1989. Although the BBC has never rerun the show, it has been broadcast on Gold and internationally.

=== Cooper and Walsh ===
In 2014, it was announced that long-time supporting actors Ken Kitson and Louis Emerick had returned to Holmfirth to reprise their roles as Police Constables Cooper and Walsh in the pilot for a new proposed spin-off, Cooper and Walsh. Alan J.W. Bell as well as crew from Last of the Summer Wine were involved in the creation of two short films while Kitson and Emerick appealed for funding through crowd-sourcing sites in the hopes of gaining enough support to produce a feature film featuring the duo or even a television series. Associate Producer Terry Bartlam believed there was enough of a scope with Cooper and Walsh that they could carry their own series and that this spin-off could be the answer to those who believed Last of the Summer Wine should have been given a proper ending.

=== Stage adaptations ===
A live production of Last of the Summer Wine, known informally as the "summer season", was produced in Bournemouth in 1983. While Bill Owen and Peter Sallis reprised their roles as Compo and Clegg, Brian Wilde chose not to take part because of personal differences with Owen. The show focused on the men's interaction with Clegg's new neighbour, Howard (Kenneth Waller), and his wife, Pearl, played by a local actress. The first act built up to the appearance of Marina (Jean Fergusson), who was in correspondence with Howard. At the end of the first act, Marina was revealed to be a blonde sexpot. Howard and Marina's story line was partly based on an early subplot of the television show. In the first series, the librarian, Mr. Wainwright, was having a love affair with his married assistant, Mrs. Partridge. Despite their efforts to keep the plot a secret, especially from Mrs. Partridge's husband, the trio of old men were well aware of the affair. The summer season reversed the roles: Howard became the married partner, and the challenge was to keep the affair secret from his wife.

The summer season proved to be a success and frequently played to packed houses. In 1984, the show was once again produced, first as a two-week tour of Britain, and then as another summer season in Bournemouth. Fergusson returned for the second summer season, once again playing Marina. Robert Fyfe replaced Waller in the role of Howard, and Juliette Kaplan took the role of Pearl for this season. Although the new characters were not originally intended to be carried over to the television programme, Roy Clarke included them in four of the following six episodes of the 1985 series, beginning with the episode "Catching Digby's Donkey". All three characters remained until the end of the sitcom.

An amended version of the show toured across Britain in 1985. Sallis was reluctant to appear in the new production, and his role in the show was rewritten and played by Derek Fowlds. Because Owen was the only member of the television show's trio to appear in the production, it was retitled Compo Plays Cupid. Once again, the summer season was a success.

A new stage adaptation of the show debuted in 2003. Based on Clarke's novel The Moonbather, the play was first performed by the Scunthorpe Little Theatre Club from 7 to 11 October 2003. Using new actors to perform the roles of Compo, Clegg, and Foggy, the play featured the trio as they attempted to get to the bottom of the disturbance created by a near-naked man in the town. The play was later performed in Eastbourne by Eastbourne Theatres from 15 July 2009 to 8 August 2009 before touring the country through November 2009.

In 2010, it was announced that long-time supporting cast members Ken Kitson and Louis Emerick would spin their characters off into their own stage adaptation, titled An Arresting Night. Kitson and Emerick, who appeared together on Last of the Summer Wine as Police Constables Cooper and Walsh from 2003 to 2010, reprised their roles in an improvised stage play. While some elements of the series will be used, the majority of the play was improvised, with Kitson and Emerick each deriving their cues of what to do from the audience. The play was successfully performed in Holmfirth, after which dates were announced in Emerick's hometown on the Wirral Peninsula.

=== Other media ===
Coronet Books released a novelisation of Last of the Summer Wine in 1974. Written by Roy Clarke as an unbroadcast original story, the novel featured Compo, Clegg and Blamire helping their friend, Sam, enjoy one last night with a glam girl. The book became the basis for the Last of the Summer Wine film, Getting Sam Home, with Blamire being replaced by Foggy. In 1983, Granada Books published a slightly different version of the first novel with Foggy in it instead of Blamire. In the late 1980s, Roy Clarke wrote two novels featuring Compo, Clegg, and Seymour. The books were published by Penguin Books under the series heading Summer Wine Chronicles, and were titled Gala Week and The Moonbather. Clarke later adapted The Moonbather into a stage play. An audio cassette of Gala Week, narrated by Peter Sallis, was released in 1988.

In the early 1980s, a daily comic strip based on the show was drawn by Roger Mahoney and appeared in the Daily Star. A compilation of these strips, published by Express Books, was released in 1983.

In 1993, the Summer Wine Appreciation Society asked their members for their favourite musical themes from Last of the Summer Wine. Ronnie Hazlehurst used the resulting list for an independently released CD collection titled Last of the Summer Wine: Original Music from the TV Series. BBC Radio released audio-only versions of episodes starting in 1995. Peter Sallis provided narration to compensate for the loss of the televised visual elements. All twelve audio episodes were released in CD format.

In 1976, a selection of early scripts from the series was published as Last of the Summer Wine Scripts. A companion guide to the show, Last of the Summer Wine: The Finest Vintage, was released in 2000. The book was written by Morris Bright and Robert Ross and chronicled the show from its inception through the end of the 2000 series. Included were interviews with cast and crew, a character guide, and an episode guide. Both the companion guide and its updated 30th anniversary version are now out of print. A release by journalist Andrew Vine titled Last of the Summer Wine: The Inside Story of the World's Longest-running Comedy Programme covered the entire series, including the story of the final words of the series. It was released on 16 August 2010. On 5 November 2012, a new book titled Last of the Summer Wine – From the Directors Chair was released and written by producer and director Alan J.W. Bell. 2023 saw the publication of 50 Years of Last of the Summer Wine: An Appreciation by author Miles Eaton. The book was released to coincide with the 50th anniversary of the first broadcast of the sitcom.

== Reception ==
I've reached the stage now where I don't want it to end. I'm hoping that as one by one we drop dead that, provided Roy is still alive, it will just keep going.

— Peter Sallis on the longevity of Last of the Summer Wine

During its first series, Last of the Summer Wine did not receive a high ratings share. The second series proved to be a success, however, and two episodes made it to the top ten programmes of the week. The programme has since consistently been a favourite in the ratings, peaking at 18.8 million viewers for an episode shown on 10 February 1985. The premiere of the 28th series in 2007 brought in an 18.6 percent share of viewers in the 6:20 time slot with an average of 3.2 million viewers. Last of the Summer Wine's audience grew from 2.7 million to 3.4 million over the 30 minutes. The show was beaten for the night only by Channel 4's Big Brother with 3.6 million viewers at 9:00 p.m., although the reality show had a smaller share of viewers for its time slot. The 29th series finale, which was broadcast on 31 August 2008, was watched by 4.2 million people, giving the network a 22.5% share for the night. The 31st series continued to bring in over four million viewers, with the series opener pulling in 4.77 million viewers for an overall 21.6% share of the ratings for the night.

Several members of the royal family were viewers of Last of the Summer Wine. While presenting OBE insignia to Roy Clarke in 2002, Prince Charles said that his grandmother, the Queen Mother, had introduced him to the show. The Queen told Dame Thora Hird during a 2001 meeting that Last of the Summer Wine was her favourite television programme.

A 2003 survey by Radio Times found that Last of the Summer Wine was the programme readers most wanted to see cancelled. With nearly 12,000 votes in the survey, the show received one-third of the total vote, and twice as many votes as the runner up in the poll, Heartbeat. Alan J. W. Bell responded that Radio Times has always been anti-Last of the Summer Wine, and Roy Clarke remarked that people who dislike the show "shouldn't switch it on" if they are "too idle to turn it off". A 2008 survey by County Life magazine, which named the show the worst thing about Yorkshire, was disputed by members of the Holme Valley Business Association, who said the show was good for business. The BBC wanted to cancel Last of the Summer Wine for years in favour of a new programme aimed at a younger audience, but the show remained too popular for cancellation; even repeats received ratings of as much as five million viewers per episode. The show came 14th in a high-profile 2004 BBC poll to find Britain's Best Sitcom, and was praised for portraying older people in a non-stereotypical, positive, and active manner. It was also praised for its clever and at times philosophical writing, and for being a family-friendly show.

Last of the Summer Wine was nominated numerous times for two British television industry awards. The show was proposed five times between 1973 and 1985 for the British Academy Film Awards, twice for the Best Situation Comedy Series award (in 1973 and 1979) and three times for the Best Comedy Series award (in 1982, 1983, and 1985). The show was also considered for the National Television Awards four times since 1999 (in 1999, 2000, 2003, and 2004), each time in the Most Popular Comedy Programme category. In 1999 the show won the National Television Award for Most Popular Comedy Programme.

== See also ==
- British sitcom
- List of British comedy series by episode count
- List of longest-running TV shows by category
- Yorkshire dialect
