= Jeepers Creepers (film series) =

American horror film series

- Official film series logo
- Directed by: Victor Salva (1–3); Timo Vuorensola (Reboot)
- Written by: Victor Salva (1–3); Jake Seal (Reboot); Sean Michael Argo (Reboot)
- Produced by: J. Todd Harris (1); Barry Opper (1); Tom Luse (1–2); Francis Ford Coppola (1–2); Victor Salva (3); Jake Seal (3–Reboot); Michael Ohoven (3–Reboot)
- Cinematography: Don E. FauntLeRoy (1–3); Simon Rowling (Reboot)
- Edited by: Ed Marx (1–2); Misty Talley (3); Eric Potter (Reboot)
- Music by: Bennett Salvay (1–2); Andrew Morgan Smith (3); Ian Livingstone (Reboot)
- Production companies: United Artists (1–2); American Zoetrope (1–2); Cinerenta-Cinebeta (1); Cinerenta Medienbeteiligungs KG (1); Myriad Pictures (2–3); Infinity Films (3–Reboot); Orwo Studios (Reboot); Ink Pine Media Limited (Reboot); Great Point Media (Reboot)
- Distributed by: MGM Distribution Co. (1–2); Screen Media Films (3–Reboot)
- Running time: 383 minutes
- Countries: United States; Germany (1); United Kingdom (Reboot); Finland (Reboot)
- Language: English
- Budget: $33.2 million (Total of 3 films)
- Box office: $130.8 million (Total of 4 films)

The Jeepers Creepers film series consists of four American horror movies. The first three movies were written and directed by Victor Salva, and the fourth was directed by Timo Vuorensola. The antagonist in each of the films is the Creeper, a demonic serial killer played by Jonathan Breck in the first three entries and Jarreau Benjamin in the fourth. The first film, starring Gina Philips and Justin Long, was a commercial success at the box office in 2001 and received mixed reviews from critics and a nomination for the Saturn Award for Best Horror Film. The second entry was also a commercial success. Subsequent entries in the series were not well received.

== Films ==
Film	U.S. release date	Director(s)	Screenwriter(s)	Producer(s)
Original series
Jeepers Creepers	August 31, 2001	Victor Salva	Victor Salva	J. Todd Harris, Tom Luse, & Barry Opper
Jeepers Creepers 2	August 29, 2003	Victor Salva	Victor Salva	Tom Luse
Jeepers Creepers 3	September 26, 2017	Victor Salva	Victor Salva	Michael Ohoven, Jake Seal, & Victor Salva
Reboot
Jeepers Creepers: Reborn	September 19, 2022	Timo Vuorensola	Sean Michael Argo	Jake Seal & Michael Ohoven

=== Jeepers Creepers (2001) ===
In Florida, Trish Jenner (Gina Philips) and her brother Darry (Justin Long) are traveling home from college for spring break. On the road, they spot the driver of an old truck dumping several bodies into a large pipe outside an abandoned church. Deciding to investigate, Darry finds a lair containing hundreds of dead bodies. At a diner, the pair receive a call from Jezelle Gay Hartman (Patricia Belcher), a woman who tells them that they are going to be tracked down by the driver, revealed to be an ancient demonic creature known as the Creeper (Jonathan Breck) who kills and eats people every twenty-three years for twenty-three days. Searching for help at a police station, the brother-and-sister duo meets Jezelle, who warns them again before the Creeper arrives. After a chase, the Creeper captures Darry and flies away with him, leaving Trish depressed and in shock.

=== Jeepers Creepers 2 (2003) ===
On its twenty-second day of feeding, the Creeper abducts a young Billy Taggart (Shaun Fleming) to the horror of his father Jack (Ray Wise) and older brother Jack Jr (Luke Edwards). The next day, the Creeper disables a school bus carrying a high school basketball team by blowing its tires with hand-crafted shurikens. After experiencing visions of Billy Taggart and Darry Jenner, cheerleader Minxie Hayes (Nicki Aycox) tells the rest of the students about the Creeper, and that the creature will go into a hibernation state at the ending of its twenty-third day of feeding. Soon after, the Creeper abducts bus driver Betty Borman (Diane Delano) and coaches Charlie Hanna (Thom Gossom Jr.) and Dwayne Barnes (Tom Tarantini), leaving the students stranded. After various students are killed by the Creeper, the Taggarts begin their search for the bus. Once there, Jack manages to shoot the Creeper in the head with a harpoon. However, the Creeper goes into its hibernation state before it can die, leaving Jack unsatisfied. Twenty-three years later, an elderly Jack awaits for the Creeper, which he kept in his farm as a sideshow attraction, to return to life for the chance to kill it.

=== Jeepers Creepers 3 (2017) ===
At night, Kenny Brandon (Jordan Salloum) watches as a man manages to cut the Creeper's hand off before being taken away. Twenty-three years later, Sheriff Dan Tashtego (Stan Shaw) and Sergeant Davis Tubbs (Brandon Smith) begin an investigation on the Creeper after the abduction of Darry Jenner. The next day, Kenny's mother Gaylen (Meg Foster) sees a vision of Kenny, who was killed by the Creeper. He warns her to move away due to the Creeper searching for its severed hand, which contains information about its identity. Meanwhile, Gaylen's granddaughter Addison (Gabrielle Haugh) is captured by the Creeper to the dismay of her friend Buddy Hooks (Chester Rushing). Ignoring the warning, Gaylen touches the severed hand, learns about who the Creeper is through visions, and gives the hand to Tashtego and Tubbs, who inspect it with other authorities. While the Creeper kills various police officers along with Tashtego, Addison manages to escape from the Creeper's truck, reuniting with Gaylen and Buddy. The next day, Buddy leaves for a high school basketball game on the same bus later attacked by the Creeper shortly before its hibernation.

=== Jeepers Creepers: Reborn (2022) ===
In Louisiana, the Horror Hound festival holds its first event in the state. Among the attendees include Chase and his girlfriend Laine, who begins to experience disturbing visions associated with the town's past and the Creeper. As the festival begins and the entertainment builds to a frenzy, Laine believes that something unearthly has been summoned.

== Cast and crew ==
=== Cast ===
List indicators
- A dark grey cell indicates the character has not appeared in that medium.
- A ^{O} indicates an appearance as an older version of a pre-existing character.
- A ^{C} indicates a cameo appearance.

Character
Character	Jeepers Creepers	Jeepers Creepers 2	Jeepers Creepers 3	Jeepers Creepers: Reborn
Character	2001	2003	2017	2022
The Creeper	Jonathan Breck	Jonathan Breck	Jonathan Breck	Jarreau Benjamin
Darius "Darry" Jenner	Justin Long	Justin Long^{C}	Mentioned	
Patricia "Trish" Jenner	Gina Philips		Gina Philips^{C}	
Sergeant Davis Tubbs	Brandon Smith		Brandon Smith	
Kenny Brandon	Stand-in corpse^{C}		Jordan Salloum	
Roach / Coach Dwayne Barnes	Tom Tarantini	Tom Tarantini		
Jezelle Gay Hartman	Patricia Belcher			
The Cat Lady	Eileen Brennan^{C}			
Trooper Robert Gideon	Jon Beshara			
Trooper Natasha Weston	Avis-Marie Barnes			
Jack Taggart		Ray Wise		
Deaundre "Double D" Davis		Garikayi Mutambirwa		
Scott "Scotty" Braddock		Eric Nenninger		
Minxie Hayes		Nicki Aycox		
Izzy Bohen		Travis Schiffner		
Chelsea Farmer		Lena Cardwell		
Andy "Bucky" Buck		Billy Aaron Brown		
Rhonda Truitt		Marieh Delfino		
Bus Driver Betty Borman		Diane Delano		
Coach Charlie Hanna		Thom Gossom Jr.		
Dante Belasco		Al Santos		
Jake Spencer		Josh Hammond		
Kimball "Big K" Ward		Kasan Butcher		
Jonny Young		Drew Tyler Bell		
Jack "Jackie" Taggart Jr.		Luke Edwards Jon Powell^{O}		
Billy Taggart		Shaun Fleming		
Sheriff Dan Tashtego			Stan Shaw	
Gaylen Brandon			Meg Foster	
Addison "Addi" Brandon			Gabrielle Haugh	
Buddy Hooks			Chester Rushing	
Kirk Mathers			Ryan Moore	
Laine				Sydney Craven
Chase				Imran Adams
Stu				Pete Brooke
Carrie				Ocean Navarro
Jamie				Matt Barkley
Michael				Alexander Halsall
Madame Carnage				Jodie McMullen
Lady Manilla				Georgia Goodman
Sam				Gabriel Freilich
Marie				Dee Wallace
Ronald				Gary Graham
DJ Phython				Romain Faure

=== Additional crew and production details ===
Film	Composer(s)	Cinematographer	Editor(s)	Production companies	Distributor(s)	Running time
Jeepers Creepers	Bennett Salvay	Don E. FauntLeRoy	Ed Marx	American Zoetrope; Cinerenta-Cinebeta; Cinerenta Medienbeteiligungs KG	United Artists; MGM Distribution Co.	91 minutes
Jeepers Creepers 2	Bennett Salvay	Don E. FauntLeRoy	Ed Marx	Myriad Pictures; American Zoetrope	United Artists; MGM Distribution Co.	104 minutes
Jeepers Creepers 3	Andrew Morgan Smith	Don E. FauntLeRoy	Misty Talley	Infinity Films; Myriad Pictures	Screen Media Films	100 minutes
Jeepers Creepers: Reborn	Ian Livingstone	Simon Rowling	Eric Potter	Orwo Studios; Black Hangar Studios; Infinity Films	Screen Media Films	88 minutes

== Production ==
The Jeepers Creepers film series originated from Victor Salva, who wrote and directed the original film of the same name. Financed by the German companies Cinerenta-Cinebeta and Cinerenta Medienbeteiligungs KG, American Zoetrope was originally going to cast A-list actors for the lead roles but executive producer Francis Ford Coppola convinced the studio to hire Gina Philips and Justin Long instead, actors who Salva believed were best for the roles as Trish and Darry Jenner. The role of the Creeper was written specifically for Lance Henriksen. After Henriksen dropped out of the project, Jonathan Breck was cast mainly for his audition, which stood out to Salva because Breck unexpectedly attended it with a shaven head after sending the film crew various head shots of himself with hair; when questioned, he told Salva that the "character wouldn't have hair". With Eileen Brennan and Patricia Belcher cast in supporting roles, Salva decided to make a cameo appearance as with most of his films. Using elements from Night of the Living Dead (1968) and Duel (1971), filming took place in Central Florida for two months with cinematographer Don E. FauntLeRoy. Produced on a budget of $10 million and using music composed by Bennett Salvay, Jeepers Creepers was released by United Artists and MGM Distribution Co. on August 31, 2001.

In 2002, American Zoetrope and Myriad Pictures announced the development of Jeepers Creepers 2 with Salva and Coppola returning to their respective duties. Principal photography took place that same year, with production concluding in July. With Ray Wise cast in a lead role, the production budget for the project was larger than the original at $17 million. Long also returned to the franchise in a cameo, reprising his role as Darry. Jeepers Creepers 2 was released by United Artists and MGM on August 29, 2003.

On September 11, 2015, a third film was officially greenlit to begin production under the working title Jeepers Creepers 3: Cathedral, shortly after Salva shared his intentions in making a film focusing extensively on the return of Philips as Trish Jenner. However, his original script was rewritten, and the film was released in 2017 by Screen Media Films as simply Jeepers Creepers 3 on one-night screenings on September 26, and on October 4, with Phillips making a cameo appearance instead. Along with mixed reviews from critics, the film sparked controversy over a joke about child molestation, due to Salva's past as a convicted sex offender, which was later removed from various screenings.

Prior to the release of Jeepers Creepers 3, Phillips said in an interview that Salva had completed a script for a possible fourth film. However, the project from Salva did not move forward, and on February 24, 2021, it was announced that a fourth film, containing no involvement from Salva, would be released as Jeepers Creepers: Reborn by Screen Media Films. Written by Sean Michael Argo and directed by Timo Vuorensola, the film serves as the first film of a new trilogy. It was released on September 19, 2022.

== Reception ==
=== Box office performance ===
Film	U.S. release date	Box office gross			Budget	Ref(s)
Film	U.S. release date	U.S. and Canada	Other territories	Worldwide	Budget	Ref(s)
Jeepers Creepers	August 31, 2001	$37,904,175	$21,467,128	$59,371,303	$10 million	
Jeepers Creepers 2	August 29, 2003	$35,667,218	$27,435,448	$63,102,666	$17 million	
Jeepers Creepers 3	September 26, 2017	$2,335,162	$1,682,690	$4,017,852	$6.2 million	
Jeepers Creepers: Reborn	September 19, 2022	$2,033,057	$4,142,156	$6,175,213		

=== Critical and public response ===
Film	Rotten Tomatoes	Metacritic	CinemaScore
Jeepers Creepers	46% (110 reviews)	49 (24 reviews)	D
Jeepers Creepers 2	26% (118 reviews)	36 (29 reviews)	C+
Jeepers Creepers 3	20% (5 reviews)		
Jeepers Creepers: Reborn	0% (15 reviews)		

=== Accolades ===
Film	Award	Date of ceremony	Category	Recipients	Result	Ref.
Jeepers Creepers	Fangoria Chainsaw Awards	July 2002	Best Wide-Release Film	Jeepers Creepers	Won	
Jeepers Creepers	Fangoria Chainsaw Awards	July 2002	Best Supporting Actor	Jonathan Breck	Won	
Jeepers Creepers	Fangoria Chainsaw Awards	July 2002	Best Makeup/Creature FX	Brian Penikas	Nominated	
Jeepers Creepers	International Horror Guild Awards	April 13, 2002	Best Movie	Jeepers Creepers	Nominated	
Jeepers Creepers	Saturn Awards	June 10, 2002	Best Horror Film	Jeepers Creepers	Nominated	
Jeepers Creepers	Saturn Awards	June 10, 2002	Best Performance by a Younger Actor	Justin Long	Nominated	
Jeepers Creepers	Sitges Film Festival Awards	2001	Best Film	Jeepers Creepers	Nominated	
Jeepers Creepers 2	Golden Reel Awards	February 28, 2004	Best Sound Editing in a Feature - Music - Feature Film	David Bondelevitch and Victor Salva	Nominated	
Jeepers Creepers 2	Fangoria Chainsaw Awards	May 2004	Best Supporting Actor	Ray Wise	Nominated	
Jeepers Creepers 2	Fangoria Chainsaw Awards	May 2004	Best Makeup/Creature FX	Brian Penikas	Nominated	
Jeepers Creepers 2	Fangoria Chainsaw Awards	May 2004	Worst Film	Jeepers Creepers 2	Nominated	
Jeepers Creepers 2	Saturn Awards	May 5, 2004	Best Horror Film	Jeepers Creepers 2	Nominated	
Jeepers Creepers: Reborn	Golden Trailer Awards	June 29, 2022	Best Horror Poster	Jeepers Creepers: Reborn (The Refinery)	Nominated	
