= Jeepers Creepers: Reborn =

2022 film by Timo Vuorensola

- Theatrical release poster
- Directed by: Timo Vuorensola
- Written by: Jake Seal; Sean-Michael Argo
- Based on: Characters by Victor Salva
- Produced by: Jake Seal; Michael Ohoven
- Starring: Sydney Craven; Imran Adams; Dee Wallace; Gary Graham
- Cinematography: Simon Rowling
- Edited by: Eric Potter
- Music by: Ian Livingstone
- Production companies: Orwo Studios; Infinity Films; Ink Pine Media Limited; Great Point Media
- Distributed by: Screen Media Films (Worldwide); Fathom Events (United States); 101 Films and National Amusements (United Kingdom)
- Release date: September 19, 2022
- Running time: 88 minutes
- Countries: United States; United Kingdom; Finland
- Language: English
- Box office: $6.1 million

Jeepers Creepers: Reborn is a 2022 supernatural horror film serving as a reboot of the Jeepers Creepers film series and the fourth installment overall. The film was directed by Timo Vuorensola, and written by Jake Seal and Sean-Michael Argo. Starring Sydney Craven and Imran Adams, with "special appearances" from Dee Wallace and Gary Graham, it follows a young man and woman who travel to a horror festival, with the latter becoming a target for a dark purpose by a reawakened creature called "the Creeper."

Jeepers Creepers: Reborn was released worldwide by Screen Media Films on September 19, 2022, and was critically panned for its production values, lack of scares, and performances. Additionally, the film became the subject of a lawsuit by Myriad Pictures, who claimed ownership of the rights after producing the previous films, and were not notified of the film's production.

== Plot ==
In 2021, millennial couple Chase and Laine travel to the Horror Hound festival in rural Louisiana. Chase is a paranormal fanatic, taking a special interest in the local urban legend of "the Creeper", a creature that every 23 years, for 23 days, kills and eats hundreds of people before disappearing. Chase plans to propose marriage to Laine on their trip, and unbeknownst to him, Laine believes she is pregnant. Meanwhile, the Creeper awakens and begins to feed in order to increase its strength. Stopping at a gift shop, Laine has a premonition when she touches a mysterious artifact. Owner Lady Manilla gives cryptic messages to the couple. At the hotel, Laine takes a pregnancy test but is interrupted when a crow slams into the window. The couple then depart for the festival.

At Horror Hound, Laine picks up a mysterious shuriken and finds she is abnormally skilled at throwing it. The Creeper arrives and begins hunting; using its truck, it knocks out internet connectivity. The couple enters into a raffle hosted by festival organizer Madam Carnage, for a chance to win a night at an abandoned plantation house that has been converted into an escape room. Laine begins to have visions of her involvement in a strange ritual within the house. A cameraman and associated crew accompanies them to document the event, along with a local tour guide, Stu.

As the group approaches the house, they travel through an 18th-century graveyard where the Creeper kills the cameraman and abducts Laine as Chase proposes to her. Laine awakens bound to a table where the Creeper pierces her abdomen with a knife. The group enters the house and feuds over their situation; Stu fires his pistol into the air attracting the Creeper's attention. The Creeper leaves Laine and hunts the group throughout the house, eventually killing all of them except for Stu and Chase.

Laine frees herself and joins them; she reveals to Chase that she is pregnant and that the Creeper has specifically targeted her as a result. They discover that Madam Carnage, Lady Manilla, and others have been worshiping the Creeper and luring victims to the house for its consumption. They enact a plan for Laine to lure the Creeper outside so Chase and Stu can push the weather vane onto it. Laine blinds the Creeper with its shuriken, and the falling weather vane impales it. A murder of crows consume the Creeper, while also killing Stu by pushing him off the roof, and fly into the night. The group departs, while elsewhere the Creeper regenerates and unleashes a devilish roar.

== Cast ==
- Sydney Craven as Laine
- Imran Adams as Chase
- Pete Brooke as Stu
- Ocean Navarro as Carrie
- Darren Kent as Skarsgard Clown
- Matt Barkley as Jamie
- Alexander Halsall as Michael
- Jodie McMullen as Madame Carnage
- Jarreau Benjamin as the Creeper
- Dee Wallace as Marie
- Gary Graham as Ronald
- Georgia Goodman as Lady Manilla
- Gabriel Freilich as Sam
- Romain Faure as DJ Phython

== Production ==
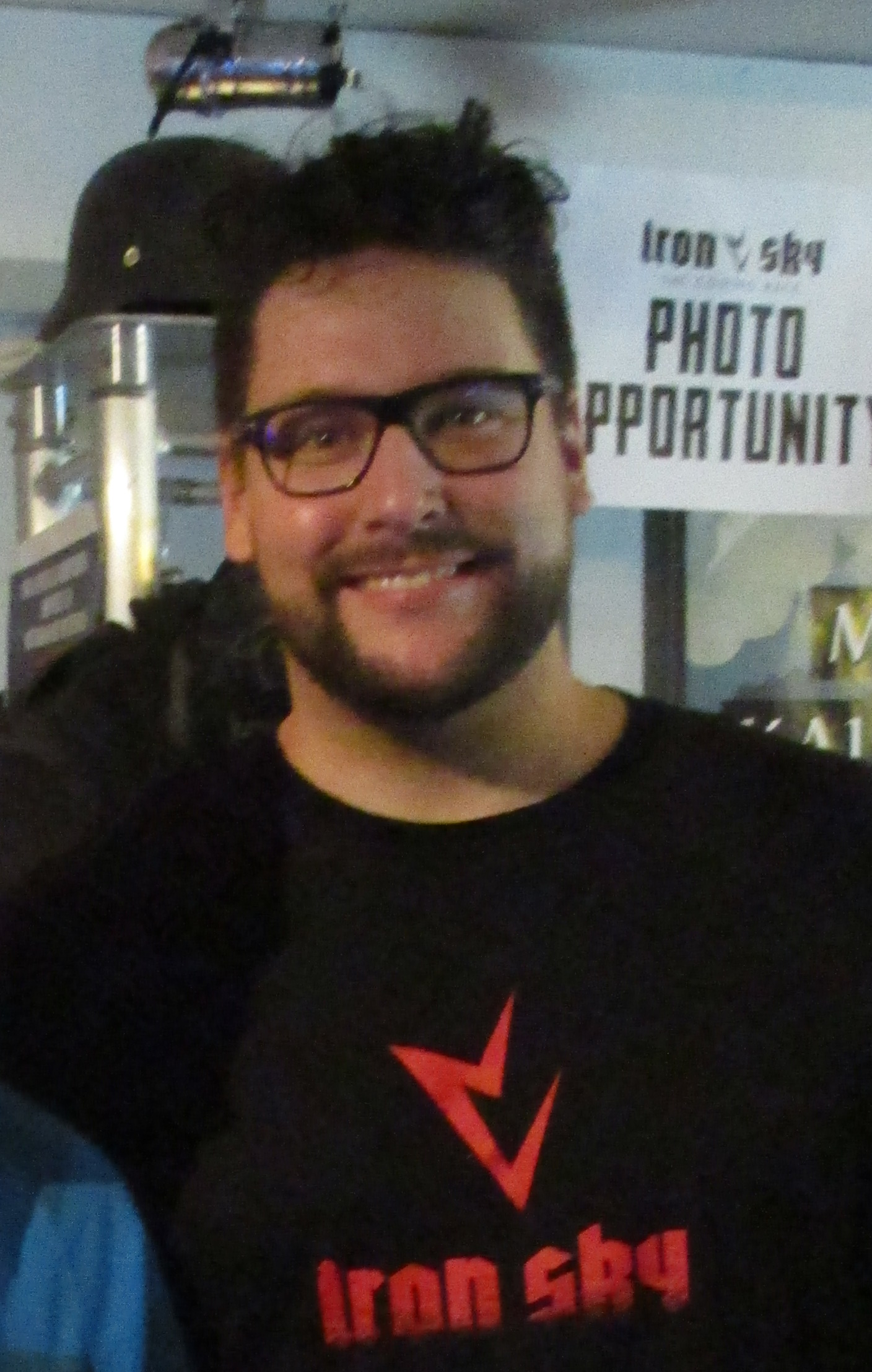
The film marks director Timo Vuorensola's Hollywood debut

The film was an international co-production between the United Kingdom, United States and Finland. Principal photography commenced for three days in Jackson, Louisiana, on location and at Orwo Studios. Soon after, the production was moved to the United Kingdom. Due to the COVID-19 pandemic, filming in the UK was split into two parts. The first began on November 23, 2020, at Black Hangar Studios, and finished on December 19. The second took place for eight days between January and February 2021.

The film's title was officially confirmed as Jeepers Creepers: Reborn in February 2021, when Screen Media Films acquired worldwide distribution rights, after previously releasing Jeepers Creepers 3 (2017). At the 2021 European Film Market, Foresight Unlimited showed a promotional reel of footage for international sales.

== Release ==
Jeepers Creepers: Reborn was released in select theaters in the United States from September 19 to September 21, 2022, by Screen Media Films in partnership with Fathom Events. Screen Media also holds worldwide distribution rights, including the United Kingdom where 101 Films and National Amusements also distribute, and released via video-on-demand and home media physical release.

=== Legal issues ===
On March 16, 2021, Myriad Pictures, the production company behind Jeepers Creepers 2 (2003) and Jeepers Creepers 3, filed a property fraud lawsuit against Infinity Films Holdings, one of the film's production companies, for producing the film without Myriad's "knowledge or involvement" and selling the distribution rights to Screen Media Films, considering Reborn an unauthorised fan film.

== Reception ==
=== Critical response ===
Critical response to Jeepers Creepers: Reborn was negative, with critics panning the film's production values, lack of scares, and performances. On the review aggregator website Rotten Tomatoes, 0% of 15 critics' reviews are positive, with an average rating of 2.7/10.

Phil Hoad of The Guardian called the film a "shoddy, aesthetically ugly reboot", criticizing the film's poorly-written script and unconvincing production values. The Sydney Morning Herald's Paul Byrnes echoed Hoad's sentiment, noting the poor performances and complete lack of tension severely damaged the overall film, calling the film vastly inferior to the previous entries in the franchise. Joel Harley from Starburst Magazine rated the film two out of ten stars, calling it "dull and forgettable", further calling attention to the low production values and predictable script.

=== Accolades ===
Jeepers Creepers: Reborn received a nomination for Best Horror Poster at the 2023 Golden Trailer Awards.

== See also ==
- List of films considered the worst
