= Ohoven =

Ohoven is a surname. Notable people with the surname include:

- Mario Ohoven (born 1946), German businessman
- Michael Ohoven (born 1974), German film producer and the founder and CEO of Infinity Media
- Ute Ohoven (born 1946), German UNESCO Special Ambassador
