= Jeepers Creepers (2001 film) =

Film by Victor Salva

- Theatrical release poster
- Directed by: Victor Salva
- Written by: Victor Salva
- Produced by: J. Todd Harris; Barry Opper; Tom Luse
- Starring: Gina Philips; Justin Long; Jonathan Breck; Eileen Brennan
- Cinematography: Don E. FauntLeRoy
- Edited by: Ed Marx
- Music by: Bennett Salvay
- Production companies: United Artists; American Zoetrope; Cinerenta-Cinebeta; Cinerenta Medienbeteiligungs KG
- Distributed by: MGM Distribution Co. (United States); United International Pictures (Germany)
- Release dates: July 28, 2001 (Fantasia); August 31, 2001 (United States)
- Running time: 91 minutes
- Countries: United States; Germany
- Language: English
- Budget: $10 million
- Box office: $59.4 million

Jeepers Creepers is a 2001 horror film written and directed by Victor Salva. It stars Gina Philips and Justin Long as siblings returning home for spring break who encounter a violent truck driver portrayed by Jonathan Breck. The film takes its name from the 1938 song, featured in the film in a version by Paul Whiteman. Patricia Belcher and Eileen Brennan also appear in supporting roles, with Salva making a cameo appearance.

The film was a co-production between the United States and Germany, with United Artists co-financing the American Zoetrope title. It filmed in various towns in Florida starting in August 2000 after Salva convinced the studios to cast Phillips and Long with the help of executive producer Francis Ford Coppola, who had previously financed his directorial debut Clownhouse (1989). Due to unforeseen budget cuts, Salva rewrote the third act during production.

The film was theatrically released by United Artists and Metro-Goldwyn-Mayer on August 31, 2001. It was a commercial success, grossing $59 million on a $10 million budget, despite mixed reviews from critics praising the first half over the second. It spawned a media franchise that includes two sequels and a reboot.

== Plot ==
Trish Jenner and her brother Darry are traveling home from college for spring break. As they drive through the Florida countryside, an old truck violently tailgates them but eventually passes. During their drive, they discuss the urban legend of Kenny and Darla — a senior prom couple who disappeared in 1978. They later see the same truck parked next to an abandoned church. The driver, wearing a large trenchcoat, dumps what appears to be corpses wrapped in blood-stained sheets into a large pipe sticking out of the ground. The driver then notices them, giving chase and forcing them off the road.

With the driver gone, Darry convinces Trish to return to the church. Hearing strange noises coming from the pipe, Darry crawls inside with Trish holding on to his feet. Darry slips down the pipe into the church basement. There he finds a dying man with stitches running down his abdomen, as well as many corpses sewn to the walls and ceiling, including those of Kenny and Darla.

Darry and Trish seek refuge at a nearby diner where they receive a cryptic call from a woman alerting them to imminent danger. She mentions a future encounter with a cat lady and playing the song "Jeepers Creepers", suggesting that one of them will meet a terrifying fate while hearing it. Darry proceeds to call the police. The siblings later learn from a waitress that the truck driver broke into their car, sniffed their laundry and looked like he "really liked it".

Two police officers escort the siblings back to the church, but reports come in that it has been set on fire. On their way back, the officers are attacked and killed by the truck driver. Darry and Trish stop at the home of an elderly woman with numerous cats to call the police. The driver sneaks in and kills the cat lady, before revealing its monstrous appearance to Trish and Darry. Trish repeatedly runs the driver over with her car, only for a giant wing to tear through its trench coat. They drive off.

They eventually reach a police station, where they meet Jezelle Gay Hartman, the psychic who called them earlier. She explains that their pursuer is an ancient creature known as the Creeper, which awakens every 23rd spring for 23 days to feed on human body parts, absorbing them into its own body. It selects its victims based on their fear. Sgt. Davis Tubbs, the officer in charge, dismisses Jezelle's warnings as delusional. Tension grows between them as Jezelle insists that the Creeper is real and that one of the siblings is doomed.

That night, the Creeper attacks the station, breaking into the holding cells and killing several prisoners to heal its wounds. Despite Tubbs' and the rest of the police force's efforts to stop it, the creature proves unstoppable. It eventually corners Trish and Darry in an upstairs interrogation room. After sniffing them both, it throws Trish aside and chooses Darry. Trish offers herself in his place, but the Creeper escapes through a window, flying off with Darry into the night.

The next day, Trish is picked up by her parents, and Jezelle returns home. In an abandoned factory, Darry's mutilated body is revealed—his back flayed open and his eyes removed. As the song "Jeepers Creepers" plays, the Creeper is seen peeking through the holes where Darry's eyes used to be.

== Cast ==
Credits adapted from the British Film Institute.

- Gina Philips as Trish Jenner
- Justin Long as Darry Jenner
- Jonathan Breck as the Creeper (Note: Breck also portrays a bald cop.)
- Patricia Belcher as Jezelle Gay Hartman
- Eileen Brennan as the cat lady
- Brandon Smith as Sergeant Davis Tubbs
- Jon Beshara as Trooper Robert Gideon
- Avis-Marie Barnes as Trooper Natasha Weston
- Tom Tarantini as Roach
- Chris Shepardson as the dying boy
- Will Hasenzahl as an "officer with hole in chest"
- Victor Salva as a victim of the Creeper

== Production ==
=== Development ===
Brad Parker's storyboard of the film's original ending

Many film news sources believe Jeepers Creepers was loosely inspired by the case of Dennis DePue. In 1990, Coldwater, Michigan, siblings Ray and Marie Thornton witnessed DePue, who had already caught their attention after quickly driving past them moments prior, disposing of a blood-soaked blanket behind an abandoned schoolhouse. DePue then tailgated them for two miles, and after he drove off, the siblings returned to the schoolhouse to investigate, finding the blanket and reporting their findings to the police. The murder case and subsequent manhunt of DePue were featured on an episode of Unsolved Mysteries on March 20, 1991. The following day, DePue committed suicide during a shootout with police in Mississippi. The episode's reenactment of events, and details contained throughout, such as a license plate game that the Thorntons played, were deemed similar to the opening scenes of the film.

While writer and director Victor Salva has not confirmed whether the film took inspiration from this case, he said the beginning was based on "a true story that I was told, only it was an elderly couple, and they went back to this pipe to see what he was throwing down there. I thought that was a tremendously brave thing to do, but I also remember, when I heard it, thinking 'If that was a movie, if they went back, I would be on the edge of my seat'". The script also borrowed elements from Night of the Living Dead (1968) and Duel (1971). Salva was inspired by his favorite film, Creature from the Black Lagoon (1954), to make a monster movie, and was influenced by the restraint displayed in the suspense films of Alfred Hitchcock, including The Birds (1963). Some readings of the film found the Creeper to share characteristics with Norman Bates in Psycho (1960), Leatherface in The Texas Chain Saw Massacre (1974), and Buffalo Bill in The Silence of the Lambs (1991), characters inspired by murderer and grave robber Ed Gein.

Salva took one month to write the screenplay, down from his average of six months. He said he wanted the Creeper to kill characters that were for the most part male because he was "very tired of seeing women slaughtered and raped" in cinema. To conceal his final girl-styled ending from viewers, Salva employed red herrings throughout the first act so viewers would think Trish was going to die. His original script also featured a twenty-page third act eventually scrapped during production. In it, Darry drives the Creeper's truck into a train, unsuccessfully sacrificing himself in an attempt to kill the Creeper. The entire sequence was storyboarded by Brad Parker in preparation for the shoot but, due to an unforeseen budget cut of $1 million, it had to be removed and rewritten. As a result, Gina Philips and Justin Long were allowed to improvise during the third act. Some scenes cut from the script were used in its sequel, Jeepers Creepers 2.

Salva wanted the film's defining moment to be the reveal that the Creeper was not human and, to do so, kept the character mysterious throughout the first half by re-writing certain scenes, going against the advice of agents, managers, and established directors. Salva gave his finished screenplay to executive producer Francis Ford Coppola, who had helped finance Clownhouse (1989), Salva's directorial debut. As a result of the successes of the 1999 films The Blair Witch Project and The Sixth Sense, Salva received four offers from interested studios within two days of completing the script. Seven to eight months later, United Artists and Metro-Goldwyn-Mayer acquired the distribution rights for $2.5 million. United Artists agreed to finance a quarter of the film's $10 million budget, with Germany's Cinerenta-Cinebeta and Cinerenta Medienbeteiligungs KG supplying the rest. The film was one of five to be produced as part of a 1991 agreement between Germany's VCL Films and United Artists to co-finance titles from Coppola's American Zoetrope, each budgeted at $10 million. Jeepers Creepers was made years after Salva served prison time (he was released in 1992) for sexually abusing a child actor during the production of Clownhouse. On working with Salva again, Coppola recalled "Some of the financing for the film fell through. One of the actors resigned when he learned about the case. So I helped Victor [Salva] get the job. I was criticized for it, but my attitude is, he has a talent, and that talent in itself is good. We don't have to embrace the person in believing that their art is a contribution to society."

=== Casting ===
"Even though I know Jeepers Creepers is a genre movie, the thing that drew me to the script is that it is a drama until The Creeper shows up. It's a relationship movie in a lot of ways. It's a brother-sister relationship movie. ... I feel that people connect to this film because there was an actual relationship between two people that they could latch on to and care about the characters." —Gina Philips

Auditions took place in Los Angeles. Philips said she wanted to star after finding the script too scary to finish in one night. She auditioned twice by herself for the role of Trish, and then once with a shortlist of actors who were auditioning for the role of Darry, one of which was Long. Salva said Philips had an "intense focus" during the audition process and that it was "her authenticity that got her the part". While Long was unsure going in to audition, Salva cast him because of his natural way of portraying fear. Coppola convinced American Zoetrope to forgo casting A-list actors in the lead roles in favor of the relatively unknown Long and Philips.

The role for the Creeper was written specifically for Lance Henriksen, who Salva had worked with on The Nature of the Beast and Powder (both 1995), but he dropped out of the project. Jonathan Breck auditioned to face his own fears of the horror genre. After being told that he would be showing his own interpretation of the Creeper, Breck spent his time researching different animal movements. On the day of his audition, he shaved his head and took part in the "sniff test", where he was told to sniff the casting crew while in character. When asked about his shaven head, Breck told the casting director that the Creeper "wouldn't have hair", before getting the part. Salva cast Eileen Brennan as "the cat lady" because of her performance in the short film Nunzio's Second Cousin. Chris Shepardson played the "dying boy" that Darry finds while in the Creeper's lair. Due to budget reasons, Salva had to write the character without any lines, but during filming, the crew eventually decided to give Shepardson a short line to say. Salva made a cameo appearance in the film as a victim of the Creeper. A casting call was held on August 19, 2000, at a Holiday Inn in Ocala, Florida.

=== Filming ===
Gina Philips played Trish

Principal photography began around Central Florida in August 2000, concluding after a period of two months. (Note: Sources vary on the actual length of filming. While news reports and the film's audio commentary say filming concluded in two months, Fangoria says it actually lasted three, and a 2010 blog from Salva says the crew stayed in Florida for four.) Opening scenes were shot on the SW 180th Avenue Road in the city of Dunnellon, with the church used in the film, the now-former St. James Church, being located miles away in Ocala. The diner, "Opper's Diner", was a set built in Lake Panasoffkee, and a reference to producer Barry Opper. An abandoned high school in Reddick stood in for the police station, while a now-demolished meatpacking factory in Ocala was used for the finale. The film was also granted permission to use the streets near three schools in Dunnellon. School officials expressed concern after learning of Salva's status as a convicted sex offender, and alleged plans to have students visit the set or serve as interns, which an on-set publicist disputed, were abandoned.

Salva called the filming process "grueling" because they had to work during the summer, facing heat waves and high temperatures. Scenes containing the church's pipe were shot using a six-foot pipe outside the church and two pipes in a sound stage warehouse, where the final scene was shot. Due to the low budget, the art department's cafeteria was also used during filming and only a few fake bodies were made to appear in the Creeper's lair. According to Long, he and Philips tried to avoid interacting with Breck throughout the shoot to avoid connecting with the actor, which presumably benefited their performances by making them look scared when they were in character.

The Creeper was designed by storyboard artist Brad Parker. Its costume was created by Brian Penikas from Makeup and Monsters while its wings were created by Charles Garcia and digitally rendered by Buddy Gheen, Scott Ramsey, and Bob Morgenroth. The Creeper's truck used on-screen, a 1941 Chevy COE and originally a flatbed truck, had its back section created entirely by production designer Steven Legler. During various takes, the truck stopped working due to its old engine. Long played the Creeper in the final scene, for the in-story implication that the Creeper had taken Darry's eyes; a plaster cast was made of his body for him to look through in the last shot.

== Music ==
Jeepers Creepers: Original Motion Picture Score

Film score by Bennett Salvay
- Released: October 2, 2001
- Studio: Todd-AO Scoring Stage
- Length: 45:29
- Label: South West
- Producers: Bennett Salvay; Victor Salva

Bennett Salvay chronology
Rites of Passage (1999)	Jeepers Creepers: Original Motion Picture Score (2001)	Jeepers Creepers 2 (2003)

The film score for Jeepers Creepers was composed and conducted by Bennett Salvay, also a music producer with Salva. Its music was recorded and mixed at the Todd-AO Scoring Stage by Shawn Murphy, and edited by Chad DeCinces. The album was mastered by Patricia Sullivan Fourstar at Bernie Grundman Mastering.

Track listing

All music is composed by Bennett Salvay.

No.	Title	Length
1.	"Main Theme" (With Victor Salva)	1:20
2.	"The Truck Attacks"	3:04
3.	"Back To The Church/The Pipe"	4:17
4.	"Finding The Body"	2:39
5.	"The House of Pain"	3:05
6.	"Kenny and Darla"	1:17
7.	"Trish's Surprise"	0:45
8.	"Trish and Darry's Theme"	1:31
9.	"The Truck Returns"	0:41
10.	"The Creeper Attacks"	2:16
11.	"Monster Mashed/The Big Flap"	4:12
12.	"Creeper's Tale"	2:45
13.	"Bone Appetite"	1:09
14.	"My Heart Goes Out"	2:38
15.	"Creepy Crawler"	1:59
16.	"My Brother's Creeper"	6:34
17.	"Jeepers Creepers" (Music and lyrics by Johnny Mercer and Harry Warren; Performed by Paul Whiteman and His Swing Wing. Singer heard on car radio Dianne Holzhammer.)	2:21
18.	"Here Comes The Boogey Man" (Written by Lawton, Brown, Smith, Lang and Benson; Performed by Henry Hall and the BBC Dance Orchestra; Vocals by Val Rosing)	2:56
Total length:		45:29

== Release ==
=== Theatrical ===
Jeepers Creepers premiered at the München Fantasy Filmfest in Germany, and at the Fantasia International Film Festival in Canada on July 28, 2001. The film was theatrically released in the United States by United Artists and Metro-Goldwyn-Mayer on August 31, 2001. It opened in 2,944 theaters and stayed in release for 126 days. In October, Jeepers Creepers was shown at the Sitges Film Festival and the Bergen International Film Festival. The film had its German release on January 3, 2002, where it opened in 298 theaters. On May 24, 2018, the film was theatrically re-released in Colombia.

=== Home media ===
Jeepers Creepers was released on DVD by MGM Home Entertainment on January 8, 2002, featuring two viewing options for viewers: standard or widescreen. A special edition of the DVD includes ten deleted and extended scenes, an audio commentary track featuring Salva, a six-part featurette on the making of the movie titled "Behind the Peepers – The Making of Jeepers Creepers", a photo gallery, and a theatrical trailer. On September 11, 2012, the film was released on Blu-ray by MGM and 20th Century Fox Home Entertainment, containing all of the same features from the DVD. On June 14, 2016, a two-disc Blu-ray Collector's Edition of the film was released by Shout! Factory, featuring a "Then and Now" featurette, interviews with producer Barry Opper and actress Patricia Belcher, and a new audio commentary on the film featuring the voices of Salva, Philips, and Long. On October 12, 2020, the film was digitally released by 101 Films, who later released the film in the United Kingdom on a Blu-ray set containing the same features as the ones found in the original special edition of the DVD and the Blu-ray Collector's Edition from Shout! Factory.

== Reception ==
=== Box office ===
In its original release, Jeepers Creepers grossed $37.9 million in the United States and Canada and $21.3 million in other countries for a worldwide total of $59.2 million. Its 2018 re-release managed to earn the film $153 thousand in Colombia, bringing the film's worldwide total to $59.4 million.

The film premiered in the United States and Canada on August 31, 2001, in 2,944 theaters on Labor Day weekend. It made $15.8 million in its first four days, ranking 1st in front of Rush Hour 2 ($11.2 million), and broke the record for the highest Labor Day opening weekend previously held by the 1996 film The Crow: City of Angels ($9.8 million). The film was able to hold the record until the release of its sequel, Jeepers Creepers 2 (2003), which made $18.3 million on its own Labor Day weekend. Jeepers Creepers made $18.1 million in its first week, and grossed $6.2 million in its second behind the releases of The Musketeer ($10.3 million) and Two Can Play That Game ($7.7 million).

In the United Kingdom, Jeepers Creepers opened on October 19, 2001, making $2.2 million in its first weekend, and a total of $8.8 million in the country. The film's largest markets after the U.K. were Mexico ($2.5 million), Spain ($2.1 million), and Italy ($2.1 million). In Germany, the film began its theatrical release on January 3, 2002, and grossed $1.3 million. In other countries apart from the United States and Canada, Jeepers Creepers made $21.3 million, bringing its total box office gross to $59.2 million. On May 24, 2018, the film was re-released in Colombia in 83 theaters, earning $153 thousand. Against its $10 million budget, the film was a commercial success.

=== Critical response ===
On the review aggregator website Rotten Tomatoes, 46% of 110 critics' reviews are positive, with an average rating of 5.6/10. The website's consensus reads: "Jeepers Creepers has a promising start. Unfortunately, the tension and suspense quickly deflates into genre cliches as movie goes on." Metacritic, which uses a weighted average, assigned the film a score of 49 out of 100, based on 24 critics, indicating "mixed or average" reviews. Audiences polled by CinemaScore gave the film an average grade rating of "D" on an A+ to F scale.

Several critics praised the film's first half but criticized the second half. Stephen Holden, from The New York Times, said that once the Creeper was revealed, the film "surrenders its imagination to formulaic plot filler". Writing for The Guardian, Peter Bradshaw said the film "goes right down the pan" after its opening scene and that it is "not genuinely scary or genuinely funny". Los Angeles Times film critic Kevin Thomas shared only positive feedback on the film and said it had the "scariest opening sequence of any horror picture in recent memory" and that "Salva has expertly built up enough sheer terror that [it is] uncomfortable to watch." From The A.V. Club, Nathan Rabin wrote that the film "begins promisingly with an economical first half [...] but once its monster takes center stage, Jeepers Creepers heads downhill in a hurry."

From BBC News, Nev Pierce called it an "unsettling, gory, but intelligent horror flick", and compared it positively to Scream (1996). Writing for the Chicago Tribune, Robert K. Elder said he disliked the film simply because many parts were left unexplained. The GW Hatchet journalist Mira Katz called the film "tragic", criticizing the writing, visual effects and the finale of the film, stating that it would leave the viewer with a "general sense of disappointment". Film critic David Edelstein, from Slate magazine, criticized the film's general storyline and 90-minute runtime but said that "the movie is good enough to put a chill into the late-summer air".

=== Accolades ===
At the Sitges Film Festival in 2001, Jeepers Creepers received a nomination for Best Film but lost to Vidocq. The following year, the film was nominated for three awards at the Fangoria Chainsaw Awards, winning for Best Wide-Release Film and Best Supporting Actor (Jonathan Breck). At that same ceremony, Brian Penikas was nominated for Best Makeup/Creature FX for his design of the Creeper but lost to the KNB EFX Group for their work on Thirteen Ghosts. On April 13, 2002, the film received a nomination for Best Movie at the International Horror Guild Awards but lost to the Canadian film Ginger Snaps by John Fawcett. On June 10, 2002, the film earned a Saturn Award nomination for Best Horror Film, while Justin Long was nominated for Best Performance by a Younger Actor.

== Franchise ==
=== Sequels ===
Two direct sequels written and directed by Victor Salva have been released. The first sequel, Jeepers Creepers 2, premiered on August 29, 2003, and takes place a few days after the original. In it, the Creeper pursues a bus filled with teenage students, who try to defeat the creature with the help of Jack Taggart, a man who seeks to avenge the death of his younger son Billy, who had been taken by the Creeper one day prior. The film features a cameo appearance from Justin Long, who reprises his role as Darry, and the appearance of Tom Tarantini, who portrayed a prisoner in the original and Coach Dwayne Barnes in the second film.

In 2015, after Salva shared his intentions in making a film focusing on the return of Gina Philips as Trish Jenner, Jeepers Creepers 3: Cathedral was officially greenlit. However, Philips' role in the film was brought down to a cameo, and the film was released in 2017 by Screen Media Films as simply Jeepers Creepers 3. The film takes place in between the two other films and follows the Creeper as it terrorizes a small community of people attempting to figure out its identity.

=== Reboot ===
A reboot, titled Jeepers Creepers: Reborn, written by Sean Michael Argo and directed by Timo Vuorensola, was released by Screen Media Films on September 19, 2022.
