= Jeepers Creepers 3 =

2017 film by Victor Salva

- Theatrical release poster
- Directed by: Victor Salva
- Written by: Victor Salva
- Produced by: Michael Ohoven; Jake Seal; Victor Salva
- Starring: Stan Shaw; Meg Foster; Gabrielle Haugh; Jonathan Breck; Gina Philips
- Cinematography: Don E. FauntLeRoy
- Edited by: Misty Talley
- Music by: Andrew Morgan Smith
- Production companies: Infinity Films; Myriad Pictures
- Distributed by: Screen Media Films
- Release date: September 26, 2017
- Running time: 100 minutes
- Country: United States
- Language: English
- Budget: $6.2 million
- Box office: $3.6–4.0 million

Jeepers Creepers 3 is a 2017 American horror film written and directed by Victor Salva. The film is the third installment in the Jeepers Creepers film series, serving as a direct interquel between Jeepers Creepers (2001) and Jeepers Creepers 2 (2003). Jonathan Breck reprises his role as The Creeper. Gina Philips returns in a cameo as Trish Jenner, her first return to the series since the original film. The film was shown in theaters on September 26, 2017, in what was originally announced as a one-night-only showing and was then shown again on October 4.

== Plot ==
One day after the events of the first film, the police discover the Creeper's truck filled with dead bodies; however, the truck is booby-trapped with spikes. When Sheriff Dan Tashtego arrives, he informs Sergeant Davis Tubbs of the Creeper and its motives. They rush to get the Creeper's truck back after learning it is headed for the impound. As Frank and Deputy Lang transport the vehicle, the Creeper abducts Frank.

The next day, Kenny Brandon's mother Gaylen sees a vision of Kenny, who was killed by the Creeper; he warns it will come for what he buried on the property and will kill her and his niece Addison. Tubbs joins a small team Tashtego put together from relatives of Creeper victims to kill it. A group of teenagers discover the Creeper's truck in a field; one of them, Kirk, accidentally activates the spear, getting impaled in the leg. As the other boys try to free him, the Creeper kills them all. Addison goes into town to buy hay for her horse and joins her friend Buddy in delivering hay to a plantation house. They find the owner and workers hiding under cars; the owner tells them to call for help. The Creeper abducts Addison. Gaylen digs up the hand Kenny found; she touches it, going into a trance.

When Tashtego's team arrives, Gaylen reveals the hand can tell them about the Creeper; Tashtego touches the hand, left shocked by how ancient the Creeper is. Addison wakes up in the Creeper's truck with Kirk; Kirk accidentally activates a booby trap, causing a metal pipe to impale his head. Tashtego and Tubbs discover the Creeper's location and they head off, along with Michael. They find the Creeper driving down the highway, but when they shoot at it, the bullets deflect and Michael is killed. A small explosive is ejected from the Creeper's truck and Tashtego and Tubbs' car lands in a field. Before the Creeper can kill Tubbs, Tashtego shoots at him from a minigun, but the bullets have little effect and the Creeper manages to kill Tashtego with an axe. With most of the team gone, Tubbs retreats.

That night, the Creeper discovers that Addison is still alive, but before he can kill her, she causes the metal pipe to shoot out and impale the Creeper's head. The Creeper loses an eye and then tries using his weapons to kill her, but his aim is off. He is hit by a truck and Addison runs away. When the truck driver gets out to see what happened, he is killed and his body is used by the Creeper to heal itself. Addison hides in a field where she is found by Gaylen and Buddy. The Creeper returns to Gaylen's house where he finds a sign that says 'We know what you are', along with the hand, and howls in anger. The next day, Addison says goodbye to Buddy before he leaves for a high school basketball game in the same bus that is attacked by the Creeper before its hibernation.

Twenty-three years later, Trish Jenner is seen reading an open letter she presumably wrote on a computer calling for people to fight against the Creeper when it returns and vows to get revenge on the Creeper for the death of her brother, Darry.

== Cast ==
- Jonathan Breck as The Creeper
- Stan Shaw as Sheriff Dan Tashtego
- Meg Foster as Gaylen Brandon
- Brandon Smith as Sergeant Davis Tubbs
- Gabrielle Haugh as Addison "Addi" Brandon
- Ryan Moore as Kirk Mathers
- Meg Wright as Gracie Mathers
- Chester Rushing as Buddy Hooks
- Jordan Salloum as Kenny Brandon
- Gina Philips as Patricia "Trish" Jenner (cameo)
- Michael Sirow as Michael Miller
- Joyce Giraud as Deputy Dana Lang
- Jason Bayle as Cal Hooks
- Michael Papajohn as Frank
- Thomas Francis Murphy as Mr. Bernardi
- Carrie Lazar as Beth Mathers

== Production ==
The third film was in development before Jeepers Creepers 2 was released in 2003. In 2006, the film was officially announced and was tentatively called Jeepers Creepers 3: The Creeper Walks Among Us. MGM had originally planned to release the movie direct to DVD, but was unable to find proper financing. The movie's script was written by Salva with a new title, Jeepers Creepers 3: Cathedral and Philips set to return as Trish from the first film.

For nine more years, the film faced many false starts and setbacks, with Salva saying "the film has come close many times to going before the cameras and I hope someone sees the wisdom in shooting this." On September 11, 2015, Salva's wish came true when the film was officially green lit to start filming in early 2016 under Myriad Pictures. However, before filming could begin in Vancouver, British Columbia, Canadian talent agencies sent out an alert to warn others about Salva's criminal past. The casting calls were subsequently removed, which halted the production, though producer Stan Spry assured a fan on Twitter that the movie was not cancelled.

The original Cathedral storyline had the film take place 23 years after the first two films. However, on the special edition Blu-ray release of Jeepers Creepers 2, Salva stated that his new script for Jeepers Creepers 3 is set between the days of Jeepers Creepers and Jeepers Creepers 2 in 2001, where the Creeper terrorizes a farming community. Philips was brought in to reprise her role as Trish in a cameo. Stan Shaw, who plays a sheriff in this film, confirmed to a fan on Twitter that the Cathedral storyline was scrapped as that material was more than 12 years old.

=== Filming ===
In January 2017, it was confirmed the film was back in pre-production and that filming would begin in February 2017 in Louisiana, instead of Canada as had originally been planned. This more closely replicates the Florida setting of the original film. Principal photography began on February 15, 2017, in Baton Rouge, Louisiana. On April 4, 2017, one of the cameramen of the production revealed on his social networks that filming had by then been completed.

== Release ==
=== Theatrical and television ===
During an interview for the Edmond Sun, Justin Hall specifically revealed that the film would be released on September 4, 2017, but nothing was confirmed by Salva or the studio. On August 16, 2017, the AMC Theatres website stated that Jeepers Creepers 3 would open on September 26, 2017. On August 29, 2017, selected theaters began selling tickets along with the official poster, revealing that the film would be on display for only one night. Fathom Events then announced that the film's premiere would also feature never-before-seen bonus pictures and an interview with Breck, who plays the Creeper in all three franchise films. A second showing in theaters on October 4, 2017, was later added.

Fandango updated the brief film synopsis shortly after, "this Fall, the Creeper returns. See the next film in the iconic horror franchise when Jeepers Creepers 3 returns for a special encore event in movie theaters nationwide for only one night on Wednesday, October 4." Other participating theaters included Marcus Theaters and Galaxy Theaters. After the theatrical showings, the film had its television premiere on the Syfy network on September 26, 2017.

=== Home media ===
The film was released on DVD and Blu-ray on December 26, 2017.

=== Marketing ===
After the filming announcement, several photos began to appear on the internet from the post-production of Jeepers Creepers 3, mainly for presenting actor Stan Shaw. Shortly after, a Behind-the-Scenes video of the film was released on social networks. The first teaser trailer ran 30 seconds and was released on September 6. The official trailer for the movie was released on September 15 on various YouTube trailer channels.

== Controversy ==
Jeepers Creepers 3 caused controversy over its alleged use of child molestation as a plotline. The dialogue "Can you blame him though? I mean look at her, the heart wants what it wants, am I right?", referring to a sexual abuse victim within the movie, was singled out for criticism due to Victor Salva's 1988 incarceration for child sexual abuse and possession of child pornography. The line was ultimately removed from the theatrical cut, but was present in the screened version delivered to critics.

== Reception ==
=== Box office ===
During its limited two-day run, Jeepers Creepers 3 grossed $2.3 million in the United States and $1.7 million in other territories, for a worldwide total of $4 million. The film played in 635 theaters on Tuesday, September 26 and was listed at #3 on the day's box office rankings behind Kingsman: The Golden Circle and It.

=== Critical response ===
On Rotten Tomatoes, the film holds an approval rating of 20% based on 5 reviews and a weighted average rating of 3.8/10.

Steve Barton, writing for Dread Central, gave the film three and a half out of five stars and said, "at the end of the day if you're a fan of the franchise, you'll be happy with this latest entry... which for my tastes is better than the second but just falls short of the goodness and quality of the original experience. The door has been left open for Jeepers Creepers 4 and whether or not that will happen remains to be seen."

Adam Dileo from IGN wrote: "An unremarkable entry in a cult favorite franchise, Jeepers Creepers 3 offers fans too little to get excited about. While the monster still rules its slice of country highway and the skies above it, the rest of the film crashes in the cornfields."

Ernie Trinidad gave the film two out of five stars, stating that it "didn't deliver the story fans were anticipating nor provide enough incentive to want to return for the inevitable sequel." Trinidad also felt that the film's daytime setting drew attention to its low quality CGI and make-up effects.

== Reboot ==
In an interview for Diabolique, Philips stated that Salva has a plot ready for a fourth installment. She said, "Victor has written what happens from the second after the conclusion of Jeepers Creepers 3. I think that's all I'm allowed to say about it, but he wrote in such detail and he had a lot of flashbacks to what happened over the years that it made it very easy for me. I got to see what will eventually happen to the character and he put enough flashbacks in there that I got to see what happened to her over the last 15 years. Let's just say, there's more to come."

A fourth film, Jeepers Creepers: Reborn, was released as by Screen Media Films without any creative input from Salva. Written by Sean Michael Argo and directed by Timo Vuorensola, the project was intended to serve as a "restart" to the series and as the first film of a new trilogy. The film was subject to a lawsuit by Myriad Pictures who claimed to still own the rights to the franchise and that they had not been notified of the film's production.
