= Par (score) =

Expected strokes for a proficient golfer

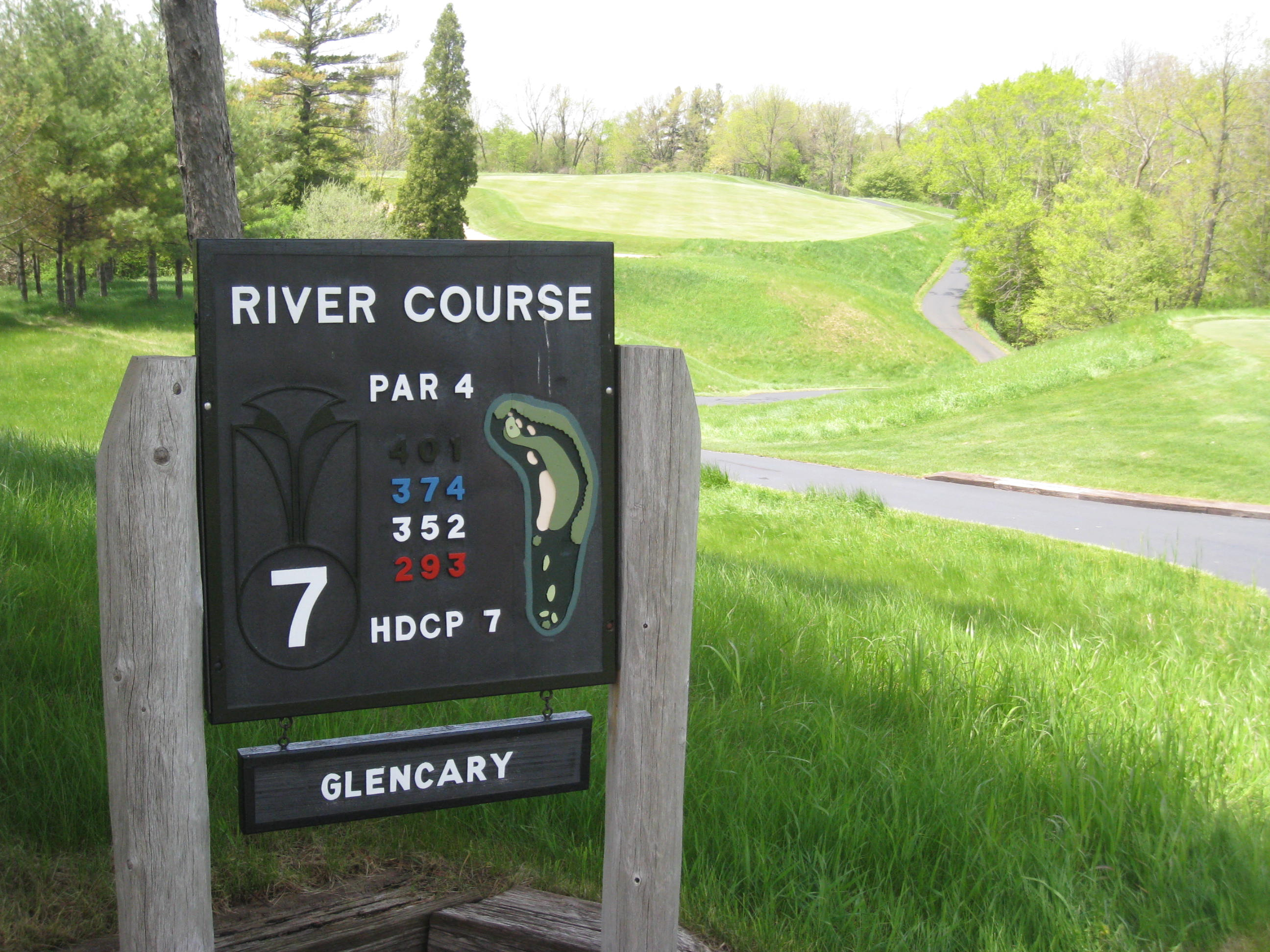
A sign at The River Course at Blackwolf Run in Kohler, Wisconsin, indicating that the seventh hole being played is a par-four

In golf, par is the predetermined number of strokes that a proficient (scratch, or zero handicap) golfer should require to complete a hole, a round (the sum of the pars of the played holes), or a tournament (the sum of the pars of each round). For scoring purposes, a golfer's number of strokes is compared with the par score to determine how much the golfer was either "over par", "under par", or "even/level par".

Holes are generally assigned par values between three and five based on the distance from the teeing ground to the putting green, and occasionally other factors such as terrain and obstacles. A typical 18-hole golf course will have a total par around 72, and a 9-hole par-3 course (where all holes are rated as par 3) will have a total par of 27.

== Determination of par ==
Par is primarily determined by the playing length of each hole from the teeing ground to the putting green. Holes are generally assigned par values between three and five, which includes a regulation number of strokes to reach the green based on the average distance a proficient golfer hits the ball, and two putts. On occasion, factors other than distance are taken into account when setting the par for a hole; these include altitude, terrain and obstacles that result in a hole playing longer or shorter than its measured distance, e.g. route is significantly uphill or downhill, or requiring play of a stroke to finish short of a body of water before hitting over it.

In general, par-3 holes for men will be under 260 yards (240 m) from the tee to the green, par-4 holes will be 240–490 yards (220–450 m), par-5 holes will be 450–710 yards (410–650 m) and par-6 holes will be over 670 yards (610 m). For women, par-3 holes will be under 220 yards (200 m) from the tee to the green, par-4 holes will be 200–420 yards (180–380 m), par-5 holes will be 370–600 yards (340–550 m) and par-6 holes will be over 570 yards (520 m) These boundaries are commonly extended or shortened for elite or non-elite tournament players, who will often encounter par-4 holes of 500 yards (460 m) or more; this is often the result of a normal par-5 hole being rated as a par-4 for them. Par-6 holes are rarely seen in professional competitions, as these will typically rate any hole otherwise designated as a par-6 as a par-5. Some golf courses feature par-7 holes, but these are not recognized by the United States Golf Association.

== Course and tournament scores ==
A golfer's score is compared with the par score. If a course has a par of 72 and a golfer takes 75 strokes to complete the course, the reported score is +3, or "three-over-par" and takes three shots more than par to complete the course. If a golfer takes 70 strokes, the reported score is −2, or "two-under-par".

Tournament scores are reported by totalling scores relative to par in each round (there are usually four rounds in professional tournaments). If each of the four rounds has a par of 72, the tournament par would be 288. For example, a golfer could record a 70 in the first round, a 72 in the second round, a 73 in the third round, and a 69 in the fourth round. That would give a tournament score of 284, or "four-under-par".

== Hole scores ==
Scores on each hole are reported in the same way that course scores are given. Names are commonly given to scores on holes relative to par.

=== Par ===
A hole score equal to the par of the hole is simply called a par. The term is thought to have originated from the stock exchange, where it was used to describe the expected value of stocks. The transition to golf was made by writer A. H. Doleman prior to The Open Championship at Prestwick in 1870, when he reported what had been described by David Strath and James Anderson as the score resulting from "perfect play".

=== Bogey ===
A score of one stroke more than par (+1) for a hole is known as a bogey, e.g. 4 strokes to complete a par 3 hole or 6 strokes on a par 5 hole.

The original meaning of bogey in golf was the number of strokes a good golfer should take at each hole, and first came into use at the Great Yarmouth Golf Club in England in about 1890, based on the phrase "bogey man" and a popular music hall song "Here Comes the Bogey Man". Players competed against Colonel Bogey, an imaginary player, who scored a predetermined number of strokes on each hole. The winner of the competition was the player who had the best match-play score against Colonel Bogey. The term appeared in print in the 28 November 1891 issue of The Field, relating to competitions held at the United Services Golf Club, Gosport. The term gave the title to a 1914 British marching tune, "Colonel Bogey March". As golf became more standardised in the United States, par scores were tightened and recreational golfers found themselves scoring over par, with bogey changing meaning to one-over-par.

Scores in excess of one stroke more than par for a hole are known as double-bogey (two strokes more than par, +2), triple-bogey (three strokes more than par, +3), and so on. For higher hole scores it is more common for them to be referred to by the number of strokes, or strokes relative to par, rather than as a "n-tuple bogey".

It is considered an achievement to complete a bogey-free round. Completing four bogey-free rounds in professional tournament play is rare. Examples are Lee Trevino at the 1974 Greater New Orleans Open; David J. Russell at the 1992 Lyon Open V33; Jesper Parnevik at the 1995 Volvo Scandinavian Masters; Manuel Piñero at the 2002 GIN Monte Carlo Invitational; Diana Luna at the 2011 UniCredit Ladies German Open; and Jonas Blixt and Cameron Smith at the 2017 Zurich Classic of New Orleans (a team event). Each of them won the tournament except Piñero, who finished third.

=== Birdie ===
A hole score of one stroke fewer than par (one under par, −1) is known as a birdie, e.g. 2 strokes to complete a par 3 hole or 4 strokes on a par 5 hole. This expression was coined in 1899, at the Atlantic City Country Club in Northfield, New Jersey. According to a story that has been passed down, one day in 1899, three golfers, George Crump (who later built Pine Valley Golf Club, about 45 miles away), William Poultney Smith (founding member of Pine Valley), and his brother Ab Smith, were playing together when Crump hit his second shot only inches from the cup on a par-four hole after his first shot had struck a bird in flight. Simultaneously, the Smith brothers exclaimed that Crump's shot was "a bird". Crump's short putt left him one-under-par for the hole, and from that day, the three of them referred to such a score as a "birdie". In short order, the entire membership of the club began using the term. As the Atlantic City Country Club, being a resort, had many out-of-town visitors, the expression spread and caught the fancy of all American golfers.

The perfect round (score of 54 on a par-72 course) is most commonly described as scoring a birdie on all 18 holes, but no player has ever recorded a perfect round in a professional tournament. During the 2009 RBC Canadian Open, Mark Calcavecchia scored nine consecutive birdies at the second round, breaking the PGA Tour record.

=== Eagle ===
A hole score of two strokes fewer than par (two under par, −2) is known as an eagle, e.g. 2 strokes to complete a par 4 hole or 3 strokes on a par 5 hole. The name "eagle" was used to represent a better score than a birdie due to it being a relatively large bird. An eagle usually occurs when a golfer hits the ball far enough to reach the green with fewer strokes than expected. It most commonly happens on par-fives but can occur on short par-fours. A hole in one on a par-three hole also results in an eagle.

=== Albatross ===
A hole score of three strokes fewer than par (three under par, −3) is known as an albatross (the albatross being one of the largest birds); also called a double eagle in the US, e.g. 2 strokes to complete a par 5 hole. It is an extremely rare score and occurs most commonly on par-fives with a strong drive and a holed approach shot. Holes-in-one on par-four holes (generally short ones) are also albatrosses, as are scores of three on par-six holes. The first famous albatross was made by Gene Sarazen in 1935 on the 15th hole at Augusta National Golf Club during the final round of the Masters Tournament. It vaulted him into a tie for first place and forced a playoff, which he won the next day. The sportswriters of the day termed it "the shot heard 'round the world."

Between 1970 and 2003, 84 such shots (averaging about 2.5 per year) were recorded on the PGA Tour.

Well-publicised albatrosses include those by Joey Sindelar at the 2006 PGA Championship, only the third in that competition's history; Miguel Ángel Jiménez while defending his BMW PGA Championship title in 2009; Paul Lawrie in the final round of the 2009 Open Championship; Shaun Micheel on the final day of the 2010 U.S. Open, only the second ever in that competition; Pádraig Harrington in the 2010 WGC-HSBC Champions; Louis Oosthuizen on the final day of the 2012 Masters Tournament, the fourth in that competition's history, the first to be televised, and the first on Augusta's par-five second hole; Rafa Cabrera-Bello at the 2017 Players Championship; and Brooks Koepka at the 2018 Players Championship.

Andrew Magee made the only par-four hole-in-one in PGA Tour history at the Phoenix Open in 2001.

=== Condor ===
Condor is an unofficial name for a hole score of four strokes fewer than par (four under par, −4). A condor is also known as a double albatross, or a triple eagle. This is the lowest individual hole score ever made, relative to par. A condor would be a hole-in-one on a par-five (typically by cutting over a dogleg corner), a two on a par-six, or a three on a par-seven (which is not known to have been achieved). Par-sixes are exceptionally rare, as are par-sevens.

As of May 2023, a condor had been recorded only five times on a par-5, once reportedly on a straight drive (a record 517 yards (473 m)), aided by the thin air at high altitude in Denver). Another was reportedly achieved with a 3-iron club (in 1995 on a horseshoe-shaped par-5 hole). In December 2020, a condor on a par-6 was recorded on the 18th hole at Lake Chabot Golf Course in Oakland, California. A condor has never been achieved during a professional tournament.

== Scorecard ==
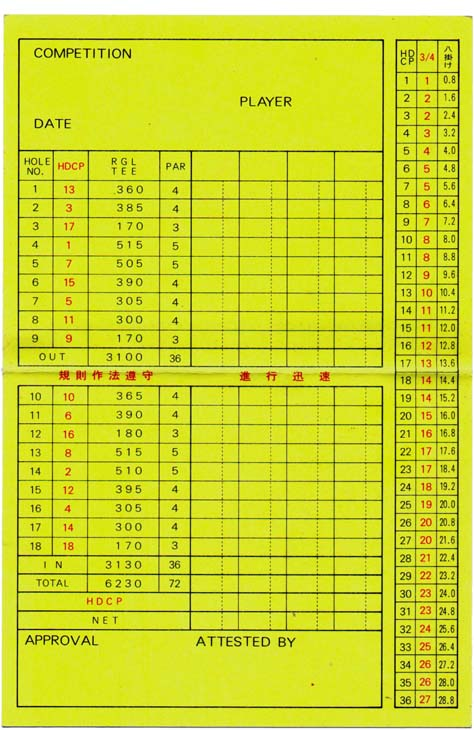
A scorecard from Sanriku Country Club in Iwate, Japan

Golfers are usually responsible for recording their own scores on a scorecard, and could be penalized or disqualified from a competition if they submit an inaccurate one. Scorecards typically share some basic information about the course, including the course rating, the slope rating, and each hole's par and handicap ratings, as well as those statistics from the different sets of color-coded tee markers denoting different yardage options to the hole. It will usually also have columns listing the overall totals for the first "front/outward nine" holes, the last "back/inward nine" holes, and the entire 18-hole course.
