= Claudia Russell =

American singer-songwriter and guitarist (born 1954)

Claudia Russell (born 1954) is an American singer, songwriter and guitarist. Before becoming a solo artist, Russell performed with a number of Los Angeles bands, including The Life Is Grand Band, who recorded for Smithsonian Folkways, and Maggie's Farm, who recorded for JRS Records and was distributed by BMG.

== Early life ==
Russell was born to Gilbert Russell né Val Rosing and Marilyn Pendry. Rosing was a well-known British crooner best known as the vocalist on the original BBC recording of "Teddy Bears' Picnic". Pendry was a dancer in TV shows, stage productions and MGM feature films, including White Christmas and An American In Paris. Russell's parents divorced in 1960.

== Career ==
Russell has released five CDs: Song Food (2000), Ready To Receive (2004), Live Band Tonight, (2007), All Our Luck Is Changing (2013), and Lover's Tree (2018). Russell is often encouraged by her husband/musical collaborator, Bruce Kaplan.

Russell tends to use a close knit group of musicians that includes percussionist Debra Dobkin, Dobro and guitar player Eric Lewis, keyboardist Carl Byron and her husband Bruce Kaplan on guitar and mandolin.

She has performed frequently in the Midwestern United States, including performances in Door County, Wisconsin, a region with which she has been particularly associated. Reviews of her performances have noted the incorporation of humor and storytelling alongside musical performances.

== Awards ==
Russell has twice been a finalist in the Kerrville Folk Festival's New Folk songwriting competition. Her debut CD, Song Food, earned her Best New Artist honors from Boston radio station WUMB in 2001.
