= Good Advice (film) =

2001 film by Steve Rash

- American movie poster
- Directed by: Steve Rash
- Written by: Daniel Margosis; Robert Horn
- Produced by: Michael Bolton; Mark Burg; Arthur Chang; Randall Emmett; George Furla; Oren Koules
- Starring: Charlie Sheen; Angie Harmon; Denise Richards; Rosanna Arquette; Barry Newman; Jon Lovitz
- Cinematography: Daryn Okada
- Edited by: Danny Saphire
- Music by: Teddy Castellucci; Lauren Scheff
- Production company: Emmett/Furla Films
- Distributed by: Artisan Entertainment
- Release date: 2001
- Running time: 93 minutes
- Country: United States
- Language: English

Good Advice is a 2001 romantic comedy film starring Charlie Sheen, Angie Harmon, and Denise Richards. The film also features Jon Lovitz and Rosanna Arquette and Lisa Rinna and Barry Newman as married couples in supporting roles.

When investment banker Ryan Turner loses everything, he must reinvent himself, and in the process becomes a better person.

The film was originally released directly to DVD in United States in 2001 by Artisan Entertainment and rereleased to digital platforms in 2025.

== Plot ==
Ryan Turner is an arrogant broker living a Playboy lifestyle in New York City with his conceited girlfriend Cindy Styne. One morning, he is playing golf with Donald Simpson, the owner of one of the biggest newspaper publishers of New York. He tells Ryan of a huge merger between his company, Simpson Inc., and a large drug corporation. Ryan, convinced that this could be his big break, informs all his clients of the huge deal that is going to happen so they all place large amounts of money into the stock.

However, the next day, Simpson reveals that there is not going to be a merger. Ryan loses most of his own, and much of his clients' money in light of the news. While confronting Simpson in his office, Simpson reveals he deliberately lied as revenge for sleeping with his wife. Ryan, now unemployed and bankrupt, sells his possessions and moves in with Cindy.

Ryan tries to get a job at another brokerage, but his license is revoked. Depressed, he lounges around all day, until Cindy tells him that she is leaving for Brazil with another man. She is dumping Ryan who she now considers "a loser" for a diamond mine owner.

Cindy was working at a small newspaper as an advice columnist. Ryan charms the editor Page Hensen into taking over the column, convincing her that an ill Cindy needs to work from home. Inexperienced at giving advice and thinking about other peoples feelings, Ryan struggles at first, and Page wants to get rid of "Cindy". However he begins giving good advice to the people writing in. The column turns into a huge hit and Page's newspaper begins to sell rapidly across the city.

Public interest expands with many people wanting to interview Cindy. So, Ryan either tells them she does not give interviews or just sends them to the door. He begins to develop feelings for Page, feelings which turn out to be mutual, and they sleep together.

Cindy unexpectedly moves back to New York, as her plans in Brazil failed. Simpson, who now wants Cindy's column for his own paper, is interested in buying. Ryan and Page are caught in bed, and reveal everything to Cindy. However, she blackmails them, and moves to Simpson's company.

Ryan uses his brokerage skills to make money off the combination of Cindy and Simpson. Inevitably, she ruins the whole transaction, as she is incapable of expressing the sympathetic advice that Ryan was offering in her absence, and Simpson's stock plummets. Ryan becomes a successful columnist and proposes to Page, ready to settle down and happily live his life with her.

== Cast ==
- Charlie Sheen as Ryan Turner
- Denise Richards as Cindy Styne
- Angie Harmon as Page Hensen
- Jon Lovitz as Barry Sherman
- Rosanna Arquette as Cathy Sherman
- Lisa Rinna as Veronica Simpson
- Barry Newman as Donald Simpson
- Meredith Salenger as Amy
- Estelle Harris as Iris
- John DeLancie as Ted
- Francoise Surel as Lucy Stone
- Pete Gardner as Carl
- Troy Beyer as Nancy
- Andrew Berman as Steven
- Christopher Burkott as Mail Room Clerk
- Madison Mason as Jim Pearson
- Renee Estevez as Flight Attendant
- Art Metrano as Homeless Man
- David Doty as Walt
- Michelle Nordin as Market Cashier
- Meredith Zeley as Woman in Bar
- Geremy Dingle as Performance Artist
- Mary Civiello as CNBC Reporter
- Ray Aranha as Man in Central Park
- Phyllis Bash as Woman in Central Park
- Bonnie Rose as Woman Reading Paper
- Daniella Rich as Waitress Reading Paper
- Paul Wagar as Golfer
- Troy Winbush as Golfer
- Ron del Barrio as Caddy
- Heidi Jo Markel as Secretary
- Queenie as Carl's Secretary
- Joseph Duer as TV Newsman
- Vanessa Branch as TV Newswoman
- Masaya Kato as Japanese Trader
- Deborah A. Berry as Mother of Patient
- Jonathan Breck as Balding Man
- Gary Combs as Cab Driver
- John Andrews as Security Guard
- Carol Martin as Herself
- Michael DesBarres as Himself
- George Whipple III as Himself
- Whitney Guss as Reporter (uncredited)
- Janis Jones as Food Desk Editor (uncredited)
- Tara Lynn Orr as Hostess (uncredited)
- Freddy Rodríguez (uncredited)
- Jamie Sherrill as Flight Attendant (uncredited)
- Carlos Tappin as Photographer (uncredited)
- Heather Wahlquist as Sarah (uncredited)

== Reception ==
On the review aggregator website Rotten Tomatoes, 33% of 6 critics' reviews are positive, with an average rating of 5.1/10.
