= John W. Bratton =

American composer (1867–1947)

John Walter Bratton
- Born: January 21, 1867; New Castle, Delaware, U.S.
- Died: February 7, 1947 (aged 80); Brooklyn, New York U.S.
- Occupations: Composer and theatrical producer
- Notable work: Teddy Bears' Picnic
- Spouse: Dorothy Zimmerman (1907–1947; his death)

John Walter Bratton (January 21, 1867 – February 7, 1947) was an American Tin Pan Alley composer and theatrical producer who became popular during the era known as the Gay Nineties.

== Early life ==
Raised by his grandmother, Mary Bratton, in New Castle, Delaware, near Wilmington, John Walter Bratton (sometimes spelled Bratten) was the son of John F. and Emma Bratton, of whom little is known. He was educated at the Harkness Academy in Wilmington and later attended the Philadelphia College of Music before embarking on a career as a baritone singer.

== Career ==
John Bratton's career soon moved from performer to composer and producer. He began in the chorus of a show called Ship Ahoy for $18 a week and not before too long was selling songs written with his friend, lyricists Walter H. Ford, for as little as $10 a title. Over the years Bratton would collaborate on over 250 songs with Ford and Paul West. One of their earlier tunes was a tribute to veterans of the Spanish–American War called "Hats off to the Boys Who Made Good", that years later Bratton conceded was "terrible". Today he is remembered for his composition Op103, dating from 1907, "Teddy Bears' Picnic", the only one of his songs to be a lasting hit. Although most of his compositions had lyrics, he left "Teddy Bears' Picnic" as an instrumental. Perhaps because it sold so well as sheet music he felt little need to do anything else with it; during the silent film era it was used as background music for a number of popular movies. Many years later, British-based but Irish-born Jimmy Kennedy wrote the lyrics. This explains why an American composition contains the British term "Mummies and Daddies" rather than "Mommies and Daddies", though the latter does crop up from time to time in copies printed in the former colony.

Tunes Bratton wrote that were popular in their day include "The Sunshine of Paradise Alley" (ca. 1895), "Henrietta, Have You Met Her?" (ca. 1895), "I Love You in the Same Old Way" (ca. 1896), "Isabella" and "In a Cosey Corner" ( ca. 1901). As half of the firm Lefler and Bratton, he produced the musical comedies Hodge Podge and Co. (1900), The Star and the Garter (1900), The Man from China (1904), The Pearl and the Pumpkin (1905) and others.

== Marriage ==
Bratton married popular Broadway actress Dorothy Zimmerman (1883–1957) on May 21, 1907. Their marriage produced a daughter.

== Death ==
John Walter Bratton died at his Brooklyn home in February 1947, aged 80. He had just completed the song "Time Brings Many Changes" with his partner Leo Edwards, brother of songwriter Gus Edwards. Bratton was survived by his wife Dorothy Bratton (née Zimmerman) and daughter.

== Musical theater credits ==
- 1900 Hodge, Podge & Co.
- 1904 The Man from China
- 1905 The Pearl and the Pumpkin
- 1909 The Newlyweds and Their Baby

His songs were featured in many other musical comedies including The Rainmakers (1894), Star & Garter (1900), The Office Boy (1903), The Toreador (1904), The Rollicking Girl (1905), and The Merry-Go-Round (1908).

== Published songs ==
- Solo works
  - "Rose Glenroy" – 1893
  - "Gayest Manhattan" – 1897
  - "I Got All I Can Do to Keep My Hands Off You" – 1899
  - "Rubber Neck Jim" – 1899
  - "In a Cosey Corner" – 1901
  - "I Want to Play Hamlet" – 1903
  - "Come My True Love" – 1905
  - "The Little Black Man" – 1905
  - "Spangles" – 1907
  - "The Jungle Jubilee" – 1910
  - "Down Red Rose Lane" – 1913
- with words by Walter H. Ford
  - "My Dainty Cigarette" – 1894
  - "Only Me" – 1894
  - "She Didn't Do a Thing to Him" – 1894
  - "Tarry Carrie Till We Marry" – 1894
  - "Henrietta! Have You Met Her? - 1895
  - "Honey Does You Love Yer Man? - 1895
  - "Songs We Hear on the Stage" – 1895
  - "The Sunshine of Paradise Alley" – 1895
  - "Because We're Together" – 1896
  - "Isabelle" – 1896
  - "It's Sunshiny Weather" – 1896
  - "She's Been a Mother to Me" – 1896
  - "Genevieve! - 1897
  - "Sadie My Lady" – 1897
  - "Hats Off to the Boys Who Made Good" – 1898
  - "Dear Old Soul" – 1899
  - "Mandy From Mandalay" – 1899
  - "Just a Word For Father" – 1900
  - "My Little Lady Bug" – 1900
  - "My Sunbeam From the South" – 1900
  - "My Sunflower Sue" – 1900
  - "I Love You in the Same Old Way" – 1906
  - "Molly McGinnity You're My Affinity" – 1907 (words/music by both)
  - "Somebody's Been Around Since I've Been Gone" – 1907
- with words by Arthur J. Lamb
  - "Only a Newsboy" – 1897
  - "The Town at the End of the Line" – 1906
- with words by Paul West
  - "My Little Hong Kong Baby (My Little Cup of Tea)" – 1902
  - "The Amorous Esquimaux (1902)
  - "I'm on the Water Wagon Now (1903)
  - "Good Bye Teddy" – 1904
  - "Happy Jappy Soldier Man" – 1904
  - "Honeymoon Hall" – 1904
  - "Seeing New York in the Rubber-Neck Hack" – 1904
  - "Jack O' Lantern Joe" – 1904
  - "When America Is Captured by the Japs" – 1904
  - "Ev'ry Baby Is a Sweet Bouquet" – 1906
  - "My Boy Bill" – 1908
  - "You'll Always Be Just Sweet Sixteen to Me" – 1908
- with words by G.A. Norton
  - "Two Little Blue Little True Little Eyes" – 1903
- with words by Charles H. Taylor
  - "The Rest of the Week She's Mine" – 1910
