= Darren Kent =

British actor, director and writer (died 2023)

- Born: 6 June 1984; Essex, England
- Died: 11 August 2023 (aged 39)
- Education: Italia Conti Academy of Theatre Arts
- Occupations: Actor, director, writer

Darren Paul Kent (6 June 1984 – 11 August 2023), also known as Darren Harper, was a British actor, director and writer. He played a goat herder in Game of Thrones and had roles in Shameless, Mirrors, Snow White and the Huntsman, EastEnders, Dungeons & Dragons: Honor Among Thieves and Jeepers Creepers: Reborn.

== Biography ==
Darren Paul Kent was born in Essex and lived in both Westbourne Grove, Westcliff-on-Sea and Leigh-on-Sea.

Kent studied at Bromfords School, the South East Essex College, and the Italia Conti Stage.

Kent played a goat herder in the final episode of season four of the Game of Thrones television show, "The Children". He played the role of Jimmy Esseker in the 2008 film Mirrors, alongside Kiefer Sutherland. His portrayal of The Scholar character in the television show Blood Drive was praised by Daniel Feinberg for presenting a character that "goes from oddball to the show’s only truly sympathetic character with impressive speed." He has also acted in Les Misérables, Shameless, Snow White and the Huntsman, EastEnders, Dungeons & Dragons: Honor Among Thieves, Jeepers Creepers: Reborn and The Frankenstein Chronicles. In 2012, he won the Best Actor award at the Van D’or Awards for his portrayal of Danny Leon, a character with a skin condition, in the 2011 short film Sunny Boy.

Kent was the writer and director of the 2015 gangster film Abusing Protocol.

Kent lived with osteoporosis, arthritis, and a skin disorder before his death on 11 August 2023, at the age of 39. (Note: THR, Variety, Fox 4 News and Entertainment Tonight report that he died at the age of 36. USA Today reported that he died at the age of 39.)

== See also ==
- List of British actors
- List of Game of Thrones characters
