= Gatlopp =

- Theatrical film poster
- Directed by: Alberto Belli
- Written by: Jim Mahoney
- Produced by: Sarah Gabriel; Marc Goldberg; James Harris; Mark Lane
- Starring: Emmy Raver-Lampman; Jim Mahoney; Jon Bass; Sarunas J. Jackson
- Cinematography: Xing-Mai Deng
- Edited by: Alberto Belli; Jeff Sharpe
- Music by: Kenny Wood
- Production company: Tea Shop Productions
- Distributed by: XYZ Films
- Release date: June 23, 2022
- Running time: 80 minutes
- Country: United States
- Language: English

Gatlopp: Hell of a Game (sometimes stylized as GATLOPP) is a 2022 American horror-comedy film directed by Alberto Belli and written by Jim Mahoney, who also plays a role in the movie.

== Plot ==
Four estranged friends reunite to play Gatlopp, a drinking boardgame. They soon discover that they must complete the magical game before sunrise, or they will be doomed to play it for eternity.

== Cast ==
- Emmy Raver-Lampman as Sam
- Jim Mahoney as Paul
- Jon Bass as Cliff
- Sarunas J. Jackson as Dominic
- Shelley Hennig as Alice
- Nancy Linehan Charles as Sheila
- Patricia Belcher as Virginia
- John Ales as Andre
- Amy Davidson as Briana
- Jeff Meacham as 80's Aerobic Announcer

== Reviews ==
On the review aggregator website Rotten Tomatoes, 80% of 15 critics' reviews are positive, with an average rating of 6.4/10. Metacritic, which uses a weighted average, assigned the film a score of 69 out of 100, based on 5 critics, indicating "generally favorable" reviews.

== See also ==
- Jumanji
