= Blue River (film) =

- Film poster
- Genre: Drama
- Based on: Blue River by Ethan Canin
- Teleplay by: Maria Nation
- Directed by: Larry Elikann
- Starring: Sam Elliott; Jerry O'Connell; Susan Dey; Nick Stahl; Neal McDonough
- Music by: Lawrence Shragge
- Country of origin: United States
- Original language: English

Production
- Executive producer: Richard Welsh
- Producers: Tom Luse; Brent Shields
- Production location: Wilmington, North Carolina
- Cinematography: Eric Van Haren Noman
- Editor: Sabrina Plisco
- Running time: 90 min.
- Production companies: Hallmark Entertainment; Signboard Hill Productions

Original release
- Network: Fox
- Release: November 21, 1995

Blue River is a 1995 American made-for-television action film directed by Larry Elikann and starring Sam Elliott, Jerry O'Connell, Susan Dey, Nick Stahl, and Neal McDonough. The film premiered on Fox on November 21, 1995. It is based on a novel of the same name by Ethan Canin.

== Premise ==
Edward is a teenager living in a family the father abandoned years before. His mother has become a Christian fundamentalist and courts a self-righteous school principal.

== Cast ==
- Sam Elliott as Henry Howland
- Jerry O'Connell as Lawrence Sellars
- Susan Dey as Mrs. Sellers
- Nick Stahl as Young Edward
- Neal McDonough as Edward Sellars

== Reception ==
Writing for the South Florida Sun Sentinel, Tom Jicha said that: "Blue River meanders aimlessly for a couple of hours without ever fully paying off the audience."
