= Hush, Hush, Hush, Here Comes the Bogeyman =

Song

"Hush, Hush, Hush, Here Comes the Bogeyman" is a song written by Lawton, Brown, Smith, Lang and Benson. It was recorded in 1932 by British band leader Henry Hall and his Orchestra, with vocals by Val Rosing.

The song refers to the Bogeyman, a legendary ghost-like monster which has no specific appearance, intended only as an amorphous embodiment of terror, usually among children.

== In popular culture ==
The song has been included in the soundtrack of several TV series, films, and video games including:

- Dad's Army
- Johnny and the Bomb BBC television adaptation
- BioShock 2
- Jeepers Creepers
- Alice is Dead (Newgrounds)
- Sinister 2
- It: Welcome to Derry
