= Teddy Bears' Picnic =

Children's song

"The Teddy Bears' Picnic"
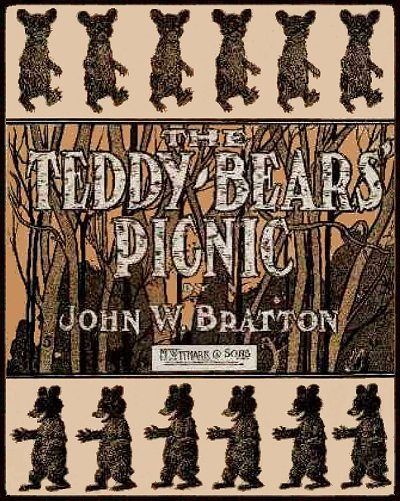
- Sheet music cover, 1907

Nursery rhyme
- Published: 1907 (instrumental); 1932 (lyrics)
- Composer: John Walter Bratton
- Lyricist: Jimmy Kennedy

"The Teddy Bears' Picnic" is a song consisting of a melody written in 1907 by American composer John Walter Bratton, and lyrics added in 1932 by Irish songwriter Jimmy Kennedy. It remains popular in Ireland and the United Kingdom as a children's song, having been recorded by numerous artists over the decades. Kennedy lived at Staplegrove Elm and is buried in Staplegrove Church, in Taunton, Somerset, England. Local folklore has it that the small wooded area between the church and Staplegrove Scout Hut was the inspiration for his lyrics.

== Historical background ==
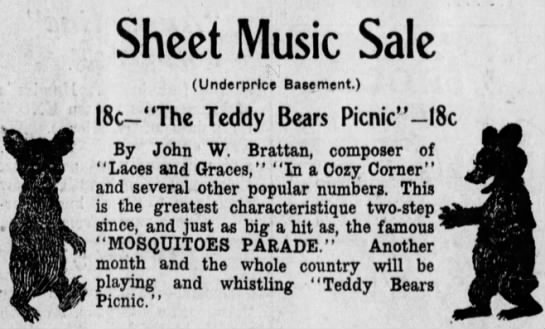
Advertisement for sheet music of "The Teddy Bears Picnic" as published in the Star Tribune newspaper in April 1908

Bratton composed and personally copyrighted it in 1907, and then assigned the copyright to M. Witmark & Sons, New York City, who published it later that year as "The Teddy Bears Picnic: Characteristic Two Step", according to the first page of the published piano score, as well as the orchestral parts Witmark published in an arrangement by Frank Saddler. However, the illustrated sheet music cover gives the title as THE TEDDY BEARS' PICNIC, with apostrophe on "BEARS" and no genre descriptor. Irish songwriter Jimmy Kennedy wrote the now familiar lyrics for it in 1932.

After Bratton wrote "The Teddy Bears' Picnic", however, many people felt that the composer plagiarized portions of the melody. Music aficionados pointed out in particular that the refrain echoed the theme from Robert Browne Hall's 1895 "Death or Glory March". Nevertheless, charges were not filed and Bratton's song still has the same tune it had in 1907.

The first recording of the piece was by the Edison Symphony Orchestra, made at Edison Records' "New York Recording Department" studio, 79 Fifth Avenue, New York City, in November 1907 and was released as Edison two-minute cylinder 9777 in March 1908, as announced on page 3 of the January 1908 issue of The Edison Phonograph Monthly (vol. VI, no. 1). Arthur Pryor's Band made the work's first disc recording for the Victor Talking Machine Company in Camden, New Jersey, on 14 September 1908. Take 2 from that session was released in November 1908 as Victor single-faced disc 5594 and as side A of the company's first double-faced disc 16001, with the title on the label reading "The Teddy Bears' Picnic/Descriptive Novelty". An early UK recording was made by the Black Diamonds Band for Zonophone records in 1908.

The first vocal version was recorded in 1932 on BBC Radio by Henry Hall with his BBC Orchestra, with Val Rosing singing Kennedy's lyrics. The song has subsequently been recorded by numerous notable artists, including: Rosemary Clooney, Bing Crosby (recorded 22 June 1950), Frank DeVol, Michael Feinstein, Jerry Garcia, John Inman, Jessie Matthews, Anne Murray, and Dave Van Ronk. Notable non-solo artists to record the song include the Nitty Gritty Dirt Band, Bad Manners, Rosenshontz, and Trout Fishing in America.

== Lyrics ==
The first verse:

If you go down in the woods today,
You're sure of a big surprise.
If you go down in the woods today,
You'd better go in disguise.
For every bear that ever there was
Will gather there for certain because
Today's the day the teddy bears have their picnic.

== Use by BBC radio engineers ==
The 1932 Henry Hall recording was of especially good quality with a large tonal range. It was used for more than 30 years by BBC audio engineers (up until the early 1960s) to aurally assess the frequency response of audio equipment.
