= Michael Ohoven =

German film producer

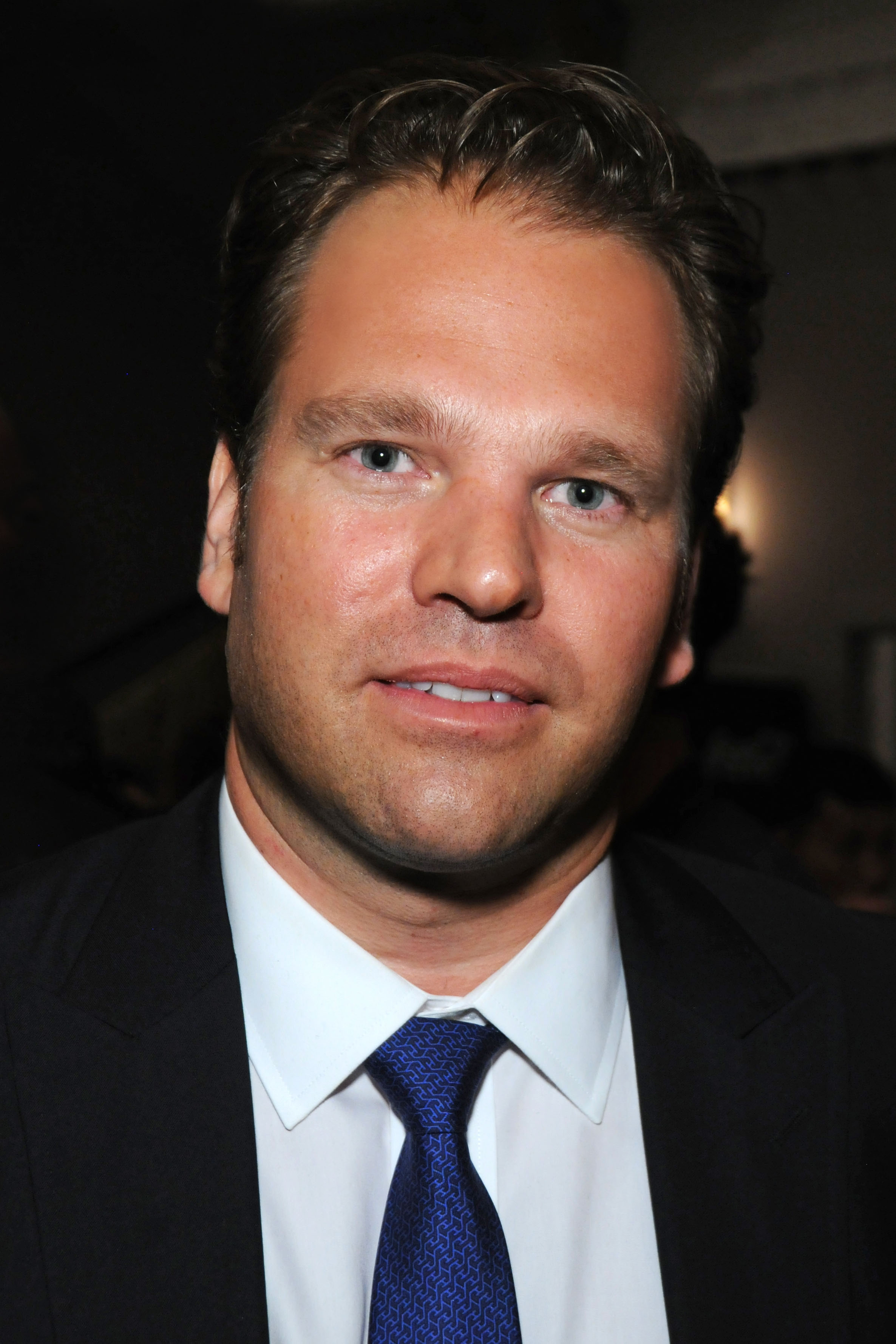
- Michael Ohoven, Beverly Hills, California on 16 March 2013
- Born: 30 August 1974 (age 51); Düsseldorf, West Germany
- Occupation: Film producer
- Years active: 2000–present
- Spouse: Joyce Giraud (m. 2009)
- Children: 2
- Family: Mario Ohoven (father); Ute-Henriette Ohoven (mother); Chiara Ohoven (sister)

Michael Ohoven (born 30 August 1974) is a German film producer and the founder and CEO of Infinity Media. He is married to Puerto Rican model, actress, and former Real Housewife of Beverly Hills Joyce Giraud.

== Life and career ==
Ohoven learned financing and institutional investment at Commerzbank and at his family's investment bank. While studying economics and business administration at University of Cologne, Ohoven joined the International Corporate Affairs division of RTL Television, one of Europe's largest private broadcaster.

After two and a half years, Ohoven left the company to form Infinity Media in 2000. Under his leadership, the company quickly established strong working relationships with major studios, talent representatives, and financial institutions. Amongst numerous international nominations and awards, Capote was nominated for Best Picture at the 2006 Academy Awards.

== Filmography ==
Year	Title	Role
2022	Jeepers Creepers: Reborn	Producer
2017	Jeepers Creepers 3	Producer
2015	Hell's Kitchen	Dining Room Guest; Episode: "18 Chefs Compete"
2013	Siberia	Executive Producer
2013	Pawn Shop Chronicles	Executive Producer
2012	Shadow People	Producer
2011	Texas Killing Fields	Executive Producer
2010	Operation: Endgame	Producer
2009	Push	Executive Producer
2007	Pride	Producer
2006	Bug	Executive Producer
2006	The Woods	Executive Producer
2005	Just Friends	Producer
2005	Capote	Producer
2005	The Cave	Producer
2005	Undiscovered	Producer
2005	The Devil's Rejects	Producer
2004	The Final Cut	Executive Producer
2004	Saved!	Producer
2003	The Snow Walker	Executive Producer
2003	The Human Stain	Executive Producer
2003	Confidence	Producer
2003	Quicksand	Executive Producer
2002	Evelyn	Producer
2002	Dead Heat	Producer
2002	Liberty Stands Still	Executive Producer
2001	Frailty	Co-Producer
2001	According to Spencer	Producer
