= Thom Gossom Jr. =

American actor (born 1952)

- Born: Thomas Gossom Jr. May 2, 1952 (age 74); Birmingham, Alabama, U.S.
- Occupation: Actor
- Years active: 1985–present

Thomas Gossom Jr. (born May 2, 1952) is an American actor.

Gossom played college football for the Auburn Tigers. He was a cast member of the TV series In the Heat of the Night. He has appeared in multiple movies, including the 2003 sequel Jeepers Creepers 2, as well as guest roles in CSI and other TV shows. He portrayed Slim's father in Queen & Slim.

== Filmography ==
Year	Title	Role	Notes
1985	Rebel Love	Pompeii (a slave)	
1996	The Chamber	Bink	
1998	Senseless	Clothing Salesman	
1999	Fight Club	Detective Stern	
2003	Jeepers Creepers 2	Coach Charlie Hanna	
2005	XXX: State of the Union	Baptist Preacher	
2016	Partners	Lieutenant K. Moore	
2019	Do Not Reply	Doctor Hunts	
2019	Queen & Slim	Slim's Father	
2020	Son of the South	Herbert Lee	
