= Tom Luse =

American film producer

- Occupation: Film producer
- Years active: 1982-present

Tom Luse is an American film producer best known for The Walking Dead, a TV series of which he was the producer and executive producer.

== Filmography ==
Year	Title	Role
1983	Murder in Coweta County	Location Manager
1989	Glory	Asst Unit Production Manager
1995	Blue River	Producer
2000	Remember the Titans	Unit Production Manager
2001	Jeepers Creepers	Producer
2002	Drumline	Unit Production Manager
2003	Jeepers Creepers 2	Producer
2003	Lost Junction	Executive Producer
2003	One Tree Hill	Production Manager
2007	Reinventing the Wheelers	Producer
2010	The Joneses	Executive Producer
2012	The Collection	Executive Producer
2010–2019	The Walking Dead	Producer, Executive Producer
2024	Rejuvenation	Executive Producer
