= Ute Ohoven =

UNESCO Special Ambassador

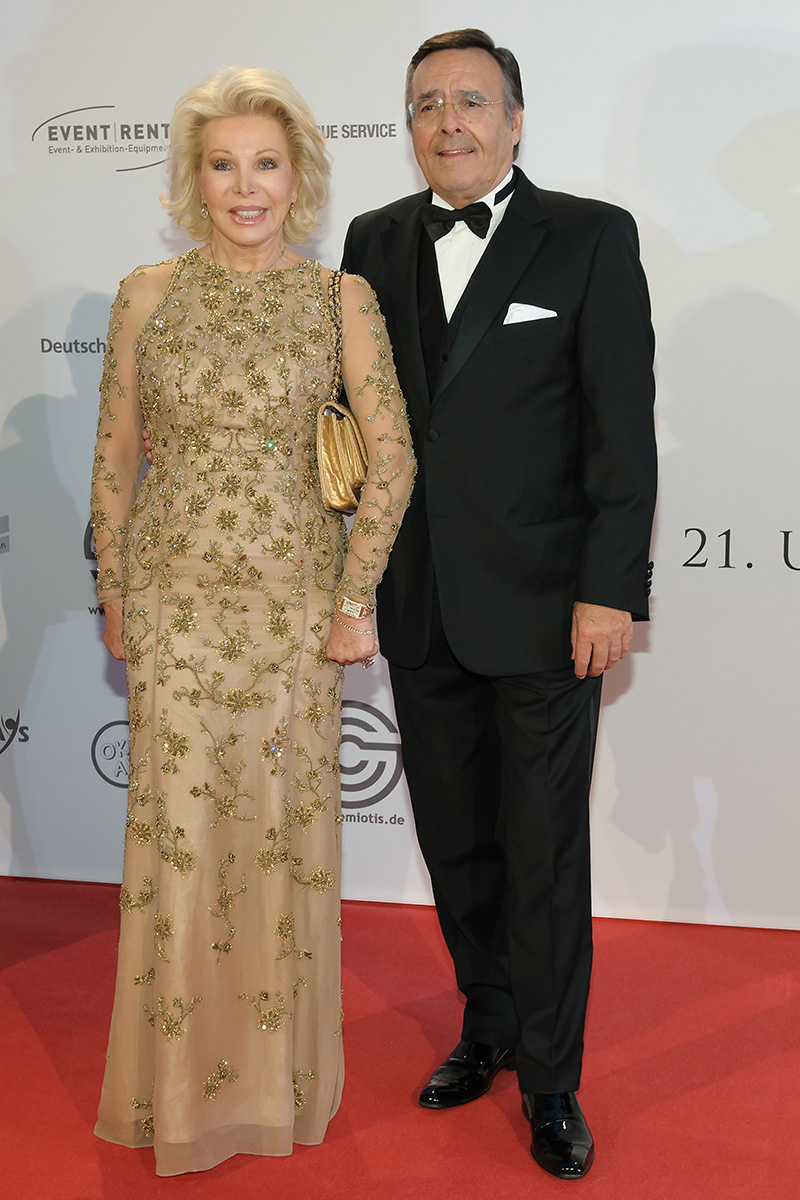
Ute Ohoven and her husband

Ute-Henriette Ohoven (born March 10, 1946, in Tübingen, Germany) is UNESCO Special Ambassador, the Honorary President of the ZNS - Hannelore Kohl foundation and the Counsel General of the Republic of Senegal. Ute Ohoven has an estimated net worth of 20€ million.

She was married to the late Mario Ohoven and is the mother of Michael Ohoven and Chiara Ohoven.

== Sources ==
- you-stiftung.de
