= 2006 Academy Awards =

2006 Academy Awards may refer to:

- 78th Academy Awards, the Academy Awards ceremony that took place in 2006
- 79th Academy Awards, the 2007 ceremony honoring the best in film for 2006
