= Jonathan Breck =

American actor

- Occupation: Actor
- Years active: 1998–present
- Known for: The Creeper in Jeepers Creepers

Jonathan Breck is an American actor. Beginning his career as a stage actor, Breck is best known for his role as the Creeper in Victor Salva's horror film Jeepers Creepers. He has also appeared in numerous other film and television productions including Beat Boys, Beat Girls, Good Advice, Spiders, I Married a Monster, JAG, Star Trek: Voyager, V.I.P., and Push.

== Filmography ==
=== Film ===
| Year | Title | Role | Notes |
|---|---|---|---|
| 2000 | Spiders | Jacobs | |
| 2001 | Full Circle | Steve | Short film; credited as Jonathan Breck Harmel |
| 2001 | Jeepers Creepers | The Creeper & Bald Cop | Two separate roles |
| 2001 | Good Advice | Balding Man | |
| 2002 | On the Edge | Cop #1 | |
| 2002 | Man in Striped Pajamas | Man | Short film |
| 2003 | Jeepers Creepers 2 | The Creeper | |
| 2003 | Jfets-D | Woodward | Short film |
| 2003 | Beat Boys Beat Girls | Mort Livingston | Short film |
| 2004 | I Left Me | Adam Panizzon / Clone | Short film |
| 2007 | Dreamland | Blake | |
| 2007 | Dead Write | Deputy Richard Hoffs | |
| 2007 | Be My Baby | Director | |
| 2007 | Kuriocity | Ray | |
| 2008 | The Caretaker | The Limo Driver | |
| 2008 | Shorts | Security Guard | |
| 2008 | Evilution | Colonel Serna | |
| 2008 | W. | Corn Dog | |
| 2008 | Will to Power | Coach Scott Hartman | |
| 2009 | The Carbon Copy | Sam Carbon | |
| 2009 | Into Shadows | Daryll Jenkins | |
| 2011 | Mask Maker | Leonard | |
| 2011 | Spy Kids 4-D: All the Time in the World | Wilbur's Boss | |
| 2013 | Parkland | Winston Lawson | |
| 2016 | Everybody Wants Some!! | Coach Gordan | |
| 2017 | Jeepers Creepers 3 | The Creeper | |
| 2017 | The Dot Man | Willard | |
| 2018 | Flypaper | Albert | Short film |

=== Television ===
| Year | Title | Role | Notes |
|---|---|---|---|
| 1998 | I Married a Monster | Friend #2 | TV movie |
| 1998 | V.I.P. | Irving Millbrook | Episode: "Diamonds Are a Val's Best Friend" |
| 1999 | Star Trek: Voyager | Dying Borg | Episode: "Survival Instinct" |
| 2001 | JAG | Marine Sergeant | Episode: "Miracles" |
| 2008 | Friday Night Lights | Oklahoma Recruiter | Episode: "Jumping the Gun" |
