= Jake Seal =

British film producer

Jake Seal is a British film producer.

== Personal life ==
Seal is married to Jodie Seal, who was Miss Universe Australia in 1996. They have three sons. Formerly a resident of London, Seal resides in Louisiana as of 2015.

== Legal disputes ==
In 2021, Jake Seal was named in a lawsuit filed by Myriad Pictures, the company behind earlier installments of the Jeepers Creepers franchise. The suit alleged that Seal, through his companies Orwo Studios and Orwo Film Distribution, co-produced and distributed Jeepers Creepers: Reborn without honoring Myriad's contractual rights to first negotiation and last refusal for future sequels. In 2024, a California court granted Myriad’s motion to compel Seal and affiliated entities to produce financial records, and imposed monetary sanctions for their failure to comply.

In October 2022, ORWO Net GmbH filed a complaint under the Uniform Domain-Name Dispute-Resolution Policy (UDRP) against Jake Seal. ORWO Net, which holds trademark rights to "ORWO", alleged that the domains were registered and used in bad faith, infringing on their intellectual property.

In 2023, Jake Seal was involved in a legal dispute related to the unreleased science fiction film A Patriot, for which he served as executive producer. Actress Eva Green brought a lawsuit against the production companies White Lantern Films and SMC Specialty Finance, seeking a $1 million fee she claimed was contractually owed. The defendants filed a counterclaim alleging that Green had undermined the project and breached her contract. In April 2023, the High Court ruled in Green’s favor, dismissing the counterclaim and affirming that she was entitled to her fee.

== Filmography ==
=== As producer ===
Year	Film	Notes
2008	Last Hour	Associate producer/co-producer
2013	The Moo Man (documentary)	Executive producer
2013	The Zombie King	Executive producer
2014	Breaking the Bank	Producer
2015	Born to Be Blue	Producer
2017	Jeepers Creepers 3	Producer
2018	Blaze	Producer
2018	Back Roads	Producer
2019	Grand Isle	Producer
2021	Willy's Wonderland	Executive producer
2022	Jeepers Creepers: Reborn	Producer, writer

=== Television ===
Year	Film	Role
2022	Salvage Marines	Producer

=== As actor ===
Year	Film	Role
1998	Knock Off	Russian Mafia (as Jake Sear Jacob)
1999	Dillagi	Jake (uncredited)
2001	Secret Admirer (video)	Charles
2003	Asylum	Mark
2008	Quantum of Solace	Bartender on Virgin Flight

=== Television ===
Year	Film	Role
2000	The Stretch	Jack
