= Patricia Belcher =

American actress

- Born: Helena, Montana, U.S.
- Occupation: Actress
- Years active: 1989–present

External image
- Patricia Belcher IMDb photo

Patricia Belcher is an American film, stage and television actress, known for her roles as Mrs. Dabney in the Disney Channel sitcom Good Luck Charlie, and as United States Attorney Caroline Julian in the FOX crime procedural comedy-drama series Bones. In film, she is known for starring in Jeepers Creepers (2001), 500 Days of Summer (2009), Bad Words (2013), Kajillionaire (2020), and Gatlopp (2022).

== Life and career ==
Born in Helena, Montana, Belcher is of African-American descent. Prior to becoming an actress, Belcher was a contestant on Jeopardy! losing to then attorney Ron Black in one of his five games.

Belcher is known for playing judges, doctors, nurses, government officials, and other authority figures, often to comic effect. She has made many appearances in films and television series including The Number 23, Unknown, Jeepers Creepers, Heartbreakers and (500) Days of Summer. She made appearances in television series, including The Norm Show (on which she had a recurring role), The Hughleys (on which she had a recurring role), Everybody Loves Raymond, Boston Legal, The Jake Effect, Twins, The Proud Family, Seinfeld, Sister, Sister, In Plain Sight, The Middle, It's Always Sunny in Philadelphia, Still Sitting down, Beverly Hills, 90210, and How to Get Away with Murder.

In 2001, Belcher was cast as Jezelle Gay Hartman, a psychic, in the horror film Jeepers Creepers. The film was a commercial success, making a total of $59,217,789 worldwide.

From 2006 until 2017, she recurred on Bones as attorney Caroline Julian. In 2009, she played Millie in the romantic comedy (500) Days of Summer. The film was a box office success earning over $60 million worldwide returns, far exceeding its $7.5 million budget. Also that year through 2010, she had a recurring role on Better Off Ted as Janet S. Crotum, the head of human resources of Veridian Dynamics.

On May 13, 2010, ABC canceled the series due to low viewing figures. After the cancellation of Better Off Ted Belcher moved on and began another recurring role on the Disney Channel sitcom Good Luck Charlie, playing neighbor Estelle Dabney. It ran for four seasons ending in 2014.

In 2013, she appeared as Ingrid in Bad Words, and she voiced Chimamanda Lobo in the video game Dead Island: Riptide. Later that year Belcher again teamed with Jeepers Creepers writer and director Victor Salva for his horror film Dark House. In 2022, she made a brief appearance in the film Father Stu playing the role of a meat and seafood grocery store clerk. She also began recurring on another Disney Channel sitcom, The Villains of Valley View.

== Filmography ==
=== Film ===
Year	Film	Role	Notes
1990	Flatliners	Edna the Ward Nurse	
1993	Black Widow Murders: The Blanche Taylor Moore Story	Nurse Kitty	Television film
1994	Doorways	Madge	Television film
1994	Clear and Present Danger	INS Officer	
1994	Attack of the 5 Ft. 2 In. Women	Female Judge	Television film
1995	Indictment: The McMartin Trial	Juror #1	Television film
1995	Species	Hospital Admittance Clerk	
1995	Body Language	Judge May	Television film
1995	Favorite Deadly Sins	Modesto Judge	Television film
1995	Dad, the Angel & Me	Christine	Television film
1996	Lawnmower Man 2: Beyond Cyberspace	Impatient Customer	
1996	Eye for an Eye	Quarreling Woman	
1996	Woman Undone	Judge	Television film
1998	You Lucky Dog	Judge Tanner	Television film
1999	Message in a Bottle	Annie	
1999	Molly	Margaret Duffy	
1999	The Wood	Mrs. Hughes	
2000	The Dukes of Hazzard: Hazzard in Hollywood	Deacon	Television film
2001	Heartbreakers	Hotel Housekeeping Maid	
2001	Follow the Stars Home	Counselor	Television film
2001	Jeepers Creepers	Jezelle Gay Hartman	
2002	The Board Room	Stephens	
2003	Dry Cycle	Abagail	
2003	I Love Your Work	Dr. Fein	
2004	Cut and Run	Roberta	Short
2004	Criminal	Female Bank Executive	
2004	Reflections: A Story of Redemption	Mom	Short
2005	The Proud Family Movie	Ms. Hightower (voice)	Television film
2005	Edmond	Woman on Subway	
2006	The Still Life	Meter Maid	
2006	Unknown	Depot Supervisor	
2007	The Number 23	Dr. Alice Mortimer	
2008	Over Her Dead Body	Helen	
2008	El Superstar: The Unlikely Rise of Juan Frances	Sister Agatha	
2008	Lower Learning	Colette Bamboo	
2008	Desertion	Barbara	
2009	500 Days of Summer	Millie	
2010	5 Star Day	Patty the Waitress	
2010	Cyrus: Mind of a Serial Killer	Maybelle	
2011	Shuffle	Psychiatrist	
2011	Forever Young at Heart	Mae Belle-Jackson-Jenksins-Dubois	Short
2012	Walking the Halls	Principal Jenkins	
2012	I Do	Gloria	
2012	Sistaah Friend	Super Shero of Unity	Short
2013	Bad Words	Ingrid	
2014	Dark House	Lee Knox	
2014	Sister	Miss Thompson	
2015	I'll See You in My Dreams	Shelter Worker	
2016	The Tiger Hunter	Sandy	
2017	The New V.I.P.'s	Myrtle	Television film
2018	The Week Of	Thelma	
2019	The Way We Weren't	Dr. Dietz	
2019	I Am Evelyn Rose	Nancy	Short
2020	Kajillionaire	Althea	
2020	Andy Richter Controls the Universe- The Reunion	Ms. Machado	Video
2020	Orpheus Star	Beula Davis	Short
2021	Asking for It	Nana	
2022	Father Stu	Maude	
2022	Gatlopp	Virginia	
2023	Ant-Man and the Wasp: Quantumania	Ant-Man Fan	
2024	Beverly Hills Cop: Axel F	Judge Angelic	

=== Television ===
Year	TV	Role	Notes
1991	Beverly Hills, 90210	Nun	Episode: "A Walsh Family Christmas"
1992	Who's the Boss?	Nurse	Episode: "Allergic to Love"
1992	Reasonable Doubts	Vivian Morgan	Episode: "Mercury in Retrograde"
1993	Civil Wars	Jury Foreperson	Episode: "Alien Aided Affection"
1993	Sisters	Receptionist	Episode: "Different"
1993	Homefront	Customer #2	Episode: "The Lacemakers"
1993	NYPD Blue	Detective	Episode: "Brown Appetit"
1994	Thea	Mrs. Brown	Episode: "Hair Today, Gone Tomorrow"
1994	Seinfeld	Woman #1	Episode: "The Pie"
1994	Dream On	Nurse	Episode: "A Face Worse Than Death"
1995	Cybill	Nurse	Episode: "As the World Turns to Crap"
1995	Martin	Inez	Episode: "Wedding Bell Blues"
1995	Coach	Neighbor #1	Episode: "Is It Hot in Here, or Is It Me?: Part 2"
1995	ER	Ward Nurse	Episode: "What Life?"
1995	Step by Step	Mrs. Sawyer	Episode: "Hello, Mister Chips"
1996	Murder One	Mrs. Harris	Episode: "Chapter Eleven"
1996	Touched by an Angel	Ms. Raphael	Episode: "Dear God"
1996	Life's Work	Gloria	Episode: "Pilot"
1996	Married... with Children	Eunetta	Episode: "A Bundy Thanksgiving"
1996	Sister, Sister	Selma	Episode: "When a Man Loves Two Women"
1997	The Single Guy	Newsweek Interviewer	Episode: "Starting Over"
1997	The Practice	The Foreperson	Episode: "Pilot"
1997	Everybody Loves Raymond	Ruth	Episode: "Neighbors"
1997	Good News	Lorraine Hudson	Episode: "Pilot"
1997	Brooklyn South	Regina Hopkins	Episode: "Pilot"
1997	Living Single	Florence Jacobs	Episode: "Mother Inferior" & "Reconcilable Differences"
1997	Chicago Hope	Stephanie Plummer	Episode: "White Trash"
1997	Players	Tante Florence	Episode: "Three of a Con"
1997	The Parent 'Hood	Principal Bobbit/Judge	Episode: "When Robert Met Jerri" & "House Arrest"
1997	Sparks	Judge Carol Barlow	Episode: "Silent Night"
1997– 1998	Sister, Sister	Councilwoman Martha Hicks	Guest: season 5, recurring cast: season 6
1998– 1999	Tracey Takes On...	Ida	Recurring cast: season 3, guest: season 4
1998– 2000	The Hughleys	Jessie Mae	Recurring cast: season 1-2, guest: season 3
1999	Maggie Winters	Ruth	Episode: "Sometimes You Feel Like a Nut"
1999	Rude Awakening	Dr. Lloyd	Episode: "The Grateful Living"
1999	The Drew Carey Show	Judge Holloway	Episode: "Drew and the Gang Law"
1999	The Parent 'Hood	Mrs. Griffith	Episode: "Wedding Bells Blues"
1999– 2001	The Norm Show	Landlady	Recurring cast: season 2-3
2000– 2001	The Trouble with Normal	Lila	Recurring cast
2001	Sabrina, the Teenage Witch	Professor Hutchins	Episode: "Do You See What I See?"
2001	The Practice	Candace Levy	Episode: "The Candidate"
2001	Family Law	Judge Wilhelmina Chais	Episode: "Sex, Lies, and Internet"
2001– 2002	One on One	Dr. Gilkes	Recurring cast: season 1
2002	Yes, Dear	Bernice	Episode: "You're Out... of Dreams"
2002	Girlfriends	Ola	Episode: "Willie or Won't He II: The Last Chapter?"
2002	Leap of Faith	Nurse #2	Episode: "The Baby Snugglers"
2002	Ally McBeal	Marsha Forrester	Episode: "Love Is All Around: Part 2"
2002– 2003	Andy Richter Controls the Universe	Ms. Machado	Episode: "We're All The Same, Only Different" & "Duh Dog"
2002– 2004	Still Standing	Miss Wanda Bodin	Recurring cast: season 1, guest: season 2
2003	The Proud Family	Ms. Hightower (voice)	Recurring cast: season 2
2004	Malcolm in the Middle	Dr. Lucille Armstrong	Episode: "Reese's Apartment"
2004	Without a Trace	Georgia Reston	Episode: "Upstairs Downstairs"
2004– 2007	Boston Legal	Judge Leslie Bishop	Guest Cast: season 1-2 & 4
2005	Close to Home	Judge Riker	Episode: "Suburban Prostitution" & "Double Life Wife"
2005	Hot Properties	Nurse Gracie	Episode: "Killer Bodies"
2005– 2006	Twins	Dolly	Recurring cast
2006	My Name Is Earl	Receptionist	Episode: "Stole P's HD Cart"
2006	Rodney	Renette	Episode: "A Tisket, a Casket"
2006	The Jake Effect	Vice Principal Curtis	Main cast
2006	How I Met Your Mother	Receptionist	Episode: "Atlantic City"
2006– 2017	Bones	Caroline Julian	Guest: season 1, recurring cast: season 2-12, 55 episodes
2007	The Loop	Pat Swanson	Episode: "Stride"
2007	Weeds	Miriam Walters	Episode: "The Brick Dance"
2008	Las Vegas	Thelma Cannon	Episode: "Three Weddings and a Funeral: Part 2"
2008	Out of Jimmy's Head	Lunchlady Edna	Episode: "Lunch Tables"
2008	The Cleaner	Sister Alma	Episode: "Rag Dolls"
2008	Cold Case	Margaret Trudlow '08	Episode: "True Calling"
2009	United States of Tara	Gloria	Episode: "Snow"
2009	According to Jim	Mrs. Kretzer	Episode: "I Hate the High Road"
2009	Community	Cafeteria Lady	Episode: "Pilot"
2009	The Middle	Mrs. Rettig	Episode: "Pilot"
2009	It's Always Sunny in Philadelphia	Judge Fishburn	Episode: "The World Series Defense"
2009– 2010	Better Off Ted	Janet S. Crotum	Recurring
2010– 2014	Good Luck Charlie	Mrs. Estelle Dabney	Recurring; 24 episodes
2011	In Plain Sight	Mrs. Anders	Episode: "Girls, Interrupted" & "A Womb with a View"
2012	Emily Owens M.D.	Dolores	Episode: "Emily and... the Question of Faith"
2014	The Millers	Sunni	Episode: "Cancellation Fee"
2014	Partners	Judge Reiss	Episode: "Paralegal Activity"
2015	Mike & Molly	Rose	Episode: "Molly's Neverending Story"
2015	I Didn't Do It	Candy	Episode: "The Doctor Is In"
2016	How to Get Away with Murder	Corrine Stefano	Episode: "She Hates Us"
2017	Santa Clarita Diet	Roberta	Episode: "So Then a Bat or a Monkey"
2017	Trial & Error	Judge Horsedich	Recurring: season 1
2017	Mom	Gloria	Episode: "An Epi-Pen and a Security Cat"
2017– 2018	The Guest Book	Bernice	Episode: "Story Six" & "Counting Problems"
2018	Code Black	Gloria	Episode: "Home Stays Home"
2018	Forever	Ellen	Episode: "June"
2018– 2019	Teachers	Mavis	Recurring: season 3
2018– 2021	A.P. Bio	Superintendent	Guest: season 1-2 & 4
2019	No Good Nick	Ingrid	Episode: "The Man in the Middle Attack"
2019	Young Sheldon	Clara	Episode: "An Entrepreneurialist and a Swat on the Bottom"
2019	Will & Grace	Ellie	Episode: "Eat, Pray, Love, Phone, Sex"
2020	Single Parents	Vice Principal Sara Yarble	Episode: "Welcome to Hilltop!"
2020	911	The Wallaces' Neighbor	Episode: "Fools"
2020	American Dad!	Citizenship and Immigration Services Clerk (voice)	Episode: "One Fish, Two Fish"
2021	The Neighborhood	Sister Sabrina	Episode: "Welcome to the Turnaround"
2021	Lucifer	Loretta	Episode: "A Lot Dirtier Than That"
2021	The Rookie	Mrs. Crouch	Episode: "A.C.H."
2022–2023	The Villains of Valley View	Celia	Recurring; 23 episodes
2022	Bob Hearts Abishola	Esther	Episode: "I'll Sleep When I'm Dead" & "Who Raised You"
2022	That Girl Lay Lay	Grandma Flo	Episode: "Fami-Lay-Lay-Reunion"
2022	Call Me Kat	Barbara	Episode: "Call Me Thor"
2022–present	The Proud Family: Louder and Prouder	Principal Hightower (voice)	Recurring
2024–present	Matlock	Mrs. Belvin "Mrs. B"	Recurring
2025	Eyes of Wakanda	Akeya (voice)	Episode: "Into the Lion's Den"

=== Video games ===
Year	Title	Role	Notes
2013	Dead Island: Riptide	Chimamanda	Uncredited Voice Role
