= Jeepers Creepers 2 =

2003 film by Victor Salva

- Theatrical release poster
- Directed by: Victor Salva
- Written by: Victor Salva
- Produced by: Tom Luse
- Starring: Ray Wise; Jonathan Breck
- Cinematography: Don E. FauntLeRoy
- Edited by: Ed Marx
- Music by: Bennett Salvay
- Production companies: United Artists; Myriad Pictures; American Zoetrope
- Distributed by: MGM Distribution Co.
- Release date: August 29, 2003
- Running time: 104 minutes
- Country: United States
- Language: English
- Budget: $17 million
- Box office: $63.1 million

Jeepers Creepers 2 is a 2003 American horror film written and directed by Victor Salva. A sequel to the 2001 film Jeepers Creepers, the film portrays the Creeper, a demonic creature who pursues a school bus filled with high-school students. Ray Wise also appears as Jack Taggart. Additionally, Francis Ford Coppola returned to the franchise as an executive producer.

Produced by Myriad Pictures and American Zoetrope, filming for Jeepers Creepers 2 took place in Tejon Ranch, and Long Beach, California, in 2002.

The film was theatrically released by MGM Distribution Co. under the United Artists label in the United States on August 29, 2003, where it was met with mostly negative reviews from critics. With a $17 million budget, the film grossed $63.1 million worldwide and spawned a prequel, released as Jeepers Creepers 3 in 2017.

== Plot ==
Three days after the events of the first film, in its 22nd day of feeding, the Creeper abducts a young Billy Taggart in front of his father Jack Sr., his older brother Jack Jr. and their dog Mac.

The next day, a school bus carrying a sports team and cheerleaders suffers a blowout, after a tire is hit by a hand-crafted shuriken. A cheerleader named Minxie Hayes has a vision of Darry Jenner and Billy Taggart who attempt to warn her about the Creeper. Another tire is blown out, disabling the bus. The Creeper ambushes and abducts the bus driver and two coaches. When the Creeper returns, he singles out six of the students: Dante Belasco, Jake Spencer, Minxie Hayes, Scotty Braddock, Andy "Bucky" Buck, and Deaundre "Double D" Davis. Minxie has another vision in which Darry says the Creeper emerges every 23rd spring for 23 days to eat humans and she tells the other students.

After hearing several police reports, the Taggarts and Mac go hunting for the Creeper and soon make radio contact with the school bus. The Creeper attacks Bucky, but Rhonda stabs it through the head with a javelin. Dante begins prodding the Creeper's wing, only for it to grab and decapitate him. The Creeper tears off its injured head and replaces it with Dante's head. The students leave the bus to find help, but the Creeper chases them into a field, where it kills Jake and takes Scotty.

When the Creeper corners Jonny, Chelsea, and Bucky on the bus, the Taggarts arrive. Jack shoots it with a harpoon, which the Creeper fights off, managing to escape after flipping over the bus. Rhonda, Izzy Bohen, and Double D find a truck and attempt to escape but are chased by the Creeper again. Izzy pushes Rhonda out of the truck before causing the vehicle to crash, injuring both Double D and the Creeper, who loses an arm, a leg, and a wing, although Izzy crawls from the wreckage before the truck explodes.

The Creeper continues to drag itself toward Double D. When it has Double D pinned down, Jack shoots it in the head with the harpoon. He repeatedly stabs the Creeper, which goes into a hibernation state before it can die.

In 2024, 23 years later, three teenagers drive out to the Taggart farm to see a sideshow attraction called "A Bat Out of Hell." They see an elderly Jack Sr. watching the Creeper with the harpoon at his side. When asked if he is waiting for something, Jack answers "About three more days, give or take a day or two".

== Cast ==
Credits adapted from the British Film Institute.

- Ray Wise as Jack Taggart
- Jonathan Breck as the Creeper
- Garikayi Mutambirwa as Deaundre "Double D" Davis
- Eric Nenninger as Scott "Scotty" Braddock
- Nicki Aycox as Minxie Hayes
- Travis Schiffner as Izzy Bohen
- Lena Cardwell as Chelsea Farmer
- Billy Aaron Brown as Andy "Bucky" Buck
- Marieh Delfino as Rhonda Truitt
- Diane Delano as Bus Driver Betty
- Thom Gossom Jr. as Coach Charlie Hanna
- Tom Tarantini as Coach Dwayne Barnes
- Al Santos as Dante Belasco
- Josh Hammond as Jake Spencer
- Kasan Butcher as Kimball "Big K" Ward
- Drew Tyler Bell as Jonny Young
- Luke Edwards as Jack "Jackie" Taggart Jr.
  - Jon Powell as an older Jack Jr.
- Shaun Fleming as Billy Taggart
- Justin Long as Darry Jenner

Additionally, voice actor Bob Papenbrook appears as the man in the station wagon near the start of the film, while Marshall Cook, Joe Reegan, and Stephanie Denise Griffin star as the group seen at the end. Writer and director Victor Salva also makes a small, uncredited cameo appearance on the cover of a magazine briefly shown on the bus.

== Production ==
The film was shot on a private road in Tejon Ranch, California. Three buses used during production were later destroyed; a fourth bus was constructed inside an airplane hangar. Victor Salva wrote a part for singer Meat Loaf but negotiations did not work out. Ray Wise's jacket caught on fire during a take of the welding sequence. The camera was upside-down for the scene where the Creeper singles out the students. Executive producer Francis Ford Coppola visited the set one day during the shoot. Much of the final act was inspired by Jaws (1975).

== Release ==
=== Home media ===
On December 23, 2003, MGM released the film on VHS and DVD. It was released on Blu-ray twice as a double feature with the first film, once by Shout! Factory.

== Reception ==
=== Box office ===
Jeepers Creepers 2 opened in 3,124 theaters and had a U.S. domestic gross of $35.6 million. Other international takings were between $27.4 and $84.3 million, depending on the source. The worldwide gross was $63.1–120 million, higher than the original. It displaced its predecessor, Jeepers Creepers, to become the new record holder for the highest ever Labor Day opening weekend four-day gross, holding the record until the 2005 release of Transporter 2. After the 2020 Labor Day weekend, Jeepers Creepers 2 still holds the #6 spot with the #8 spot still held by Jeepers Creepers. Allowing for films that had been released prior to Labor Day, Jeepers Creepers 2 holds the #9 spot after the 2015 Labor Day four-day weekend.

=== Critical response ===
On the review aggregator website Rotten Tomatoes, 26% of 118 critics' reviews are positive, with an average rating of 4.4/10. The website's consensus reads: "Jeepers Creepers 2 is competently made, but it doesn't have the scares of the original." Metacritic, which uses a weighted average, assigned the film a score of 36 out of 100, based on 29 critics, indicating "generally unfavorable" reviews. Audiences polled by CinemaScore gave the film an average grade of "C+" on an A+ to F scale.

Andy Klein of Variety wrote, "Few things are scarier than a sequel to a bad movie, but, in fact, Jeepers Creepers 2 is substantially better than its predecessor, even while staying strictly within the genre's well-defined boundaries."

Michael Rechtshaffen of The Hollywood Reporter wrote, "The sequel has got the creepy bits down cold but lacks a fair share of scares."

Roger Ebert, writing for The Chicago Sun-Times, rated the film one out of four stars and said, "Victor Salva's Jeepers Creepers 2 supplies us with a first-class creature, a fourth-rate story, and dialogue possibly created by feeding the screenplay into a pasta maker."

In The New York Times, Dave Kehr wrote that the creature lacks personality when the concept is retooled into a film series.

Gene Seymour of the Los Angeles Times wrote that the sequel lacks the mood of the first film, and the teen protagonists are too annoying to draw much of the audience's sympathy. However, Seymour praised Wise's performance.

In a positive review, Nathan Rabin of The A.V. Club called it "the rare sequel that's not only bigger than its predecessor, but also better".

=== Accolades ===
- Nomination – Academy of Science Fiction, Fantasy & Horror Films
- Nomination – Saturn Award Best Horror Film
- Nomination – Motion Picture Sound Editors: Golden Reel Award Best Sound Editing in a Feature Film (David Bondelevitch and Victor Salva)

== Sequel ==
In September 2015, Jeepers Creepers 3 was officially greenlit. The film was slated to begin filming in April 2016 until production was halted when Victor Salva was boycotted from filming in Canada for his criminal past.

The film was eventually released in a one-night-only showing on September 26, 2017, 14 years after the release of Jeepers Creepers 2. It grossed $2.3 million in theaters.
