= Jodie McMullen =

Jodie McMullen (born 15 February 1974) is an Australian actress, model, TV host and beauty pageant titleholder who was crowned Miss Universe Australia 1996 and represented her country at Miss Universe 1996, she did not make the top 10 but won the Miss Congeniality award. Later she made her UK TV debut in 2007 with a role in the TV series Honest. She has worked as a freelance writer for several online and print magazines.
