= Val Rosing =

British dance band singer (1910–1969)

Valerian Rosing (1910–1969), also known after 1938 as Gilbert Russell, was a British dance band singer best known as the vocalist with the BBC in the BBC Dance Orchestra directed by Henry Hall.

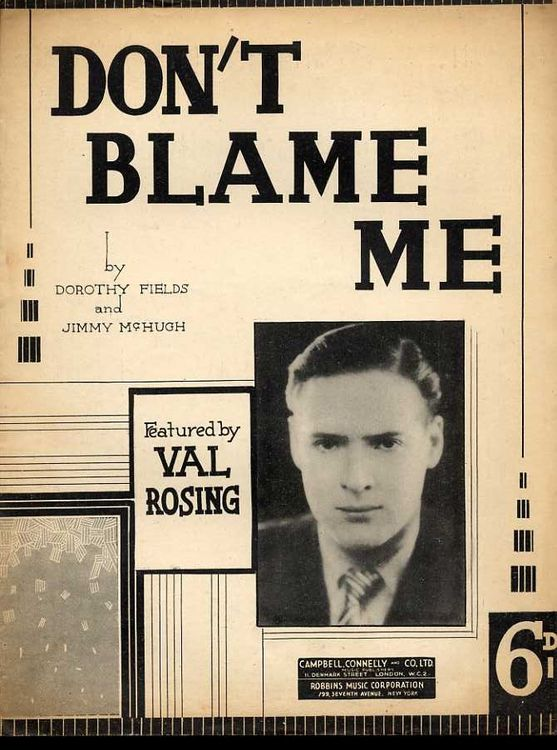
Val Rosing on the sheet music cover of "Don't Blame Me", published in 1933

Rosing was the son of Russian tenor Vladimir Rosing and English singer Marie Falle. Rosing sang on the original BBC recording of "Teddy Bears' Picnic" as well as "In a Little Gypsy Tea Room". He also sang on the Ray Noble Orchestra's version of "Try a Little Tenderness", the first recording of this well-covered song. Rosing recorded more than one hundred sides with various English bands, including Spike Hughes and His Decca-Dents, the Jack Payne Orchestra, Jack Hylton's Orchestra and Rosing's own Radio Rhythm Rascals.

In 1938, Rosing moved to America at the urging of Louis B. Mayer, who renamed him Gilbert Russell, with hopes of making Rosing the "English Bing Crosby". His years at MGM were uneventful and, after his stint with the studio, he sang and acted in musicals and light operas around the country. Making the transition from pop to "legitimate" singer, Rosing legally changed his name to Gilbert Russell and sang in Chicago Theater of the Air, the New York City Opera, and the San Francisco Opera.

During March 1960, Russell performed in Tonight at the Opera starring Kathryn Grayson at the Sombrero Playhouse in Phoenix, Arizona. Russell sang the final scenes from Faust with Jean Cook, to an audience that included then first lady Mamie Eisenhower. His father, Vladimir Rosing, staged the production.

In the 1960s, Gilbert Russell worked as one of Hollywood's top vocal coaches, with students that included Natalie Wood, George Chakiris, June Lockhart and Tina Louise.

Russell was married three times. The first, in 1932, was to English actress Meriel Carrington. They had a daughter, the artist Anna Edouard. His second marriage was in 1953 to Marilyn Pendry, a dancer in movies such as White Christmas and An American in Paris. They had one daughter, Claudia Russell, before divorcing. Russell's third marriage was in 1961 to June Baum, a singer and actress.

Gilbert Russell (Val Rosing) died of colon cancer in 1969 at the age of 59 and is buried at Eden Cemetery in Los Angeles.
