= Myriad Pictures =

American entertainment company

- Type: Private
- Industry: Motion picture
- Predecessor: J&M Entertainment
- Founded: 1999; 27 years ago
- Founder: Kirk D'Amico
- Headquarters: Santa Monica CA (USA), United States
- Key people: Kirk D'Amico, President and CEO
- Products: Motion Films
- Website: myriadpictures.com

Myriad Pictures is an independent entertainment company in Santa Monica, California, founded in 1999 and specializing in the production, financing, and worldwide distribution of feature films and television programming.

== History ==
President and CEO Kirk D'Amico opened the company in 1999 and has built a diverse library of art house and mainstream programming.

In 2009, Myriad supported the Academy Award campaign for director Bruno Barreto's Last Stop 174, which was Brazil's Official Selection to the 2009 Academy Awards in the Best Foreign Language Film category.

Myriad's library includes; Kinsey, starring Liam Neeson; The Good Girl, starring Jennifer Aniston and Jake Gyllenhaal; Little Fish, starring Cate Blanchett; Factory Girl, starring Sienna Miller and Guy Pearce; Death Defying Acts, starring Catherine Zeta-Jones and Guy Pearce; Serious Moonlight, starring Meg Ryan, Tim Hutton and Kristen Bell; Not Forgotten, starring Simon Baker and Paz Vega; the Van Wilder trilogy and Jeepers Creepers 2.

== Distribution ==
In 2008, the company released Mother of Tears, classic horror film director Dario Argento's long-anticipated sequel to his witches trilogy, starring Asia Argento and Udo Kier. In spring 2010, Myriad theatrically released the thriller The Cry of the Owl, based on the book by Patricia Highsmith and starring Julia Stiles and Paddy Considine. The DVD was released through Paramount Home Entertainment in summer 2010. Myriad released the Ben Kingsley film A Common Man in 2012.

== Litigation ==
Equity Pictures Medienfonds GmbH & Co. KG pursued legal proceedings in the U.S. Central California District Court in 2014. The case was dismissed on grounds of the settlement agreement requiring arbitration as a means of conflict resolution.
