= Rites of Passage (1999 film) =

1999 film by Victor Salva

- Directed by: Victor Salva
- Written by: Victor Salva
- Produced by: Pierre David; J. Todd Harris
- Starring: Dean Stockwell; Jason Behr; Robert Keith; Jaimz Woolvett; James Remar
- Cinematography: Don E. Fauntleroy
- Edited by: Ed Marx
- Music by: Bennett Salvay
- Distributed by: World International Network
- Release date: October 27, 1999
- Running time: 92 minutes
- Country: United States
- Language: English

Rites of Passage is a 1999 thriller film written and directed by Victor Salva and starring Dean Stockwell, James Remar, and Jason Behr.

== Plot ==
The film begins with two recently escaped convicts – Frank (James Remar) and "Red" (Jaimz Woolvett) – approaching a group of campers. Frank, the elder of the pair, shoots and kills the campers.

D.J. Farraday (Robert Glen Keith) discovers that his father, Del (Dean Stockwell), has been having an affair. D.J. asks Del to meet him at the family's cabin by the lake, where D.J. intends to confront him about his adultery. When the two arrive at the summer house, they find Del's younger son, Campbell "Cam" Farraday (Jason Behr), already there. Eventually it is revealed that Del had found Cam and his boyfriend, Billy, embracing there at the cabin. Del brutally beat Billy, and father and son have not spoken since. While D.J. is trying to convince Cam to stay and attempt a reconciliation, Cam reveals to him that Billy is dead, and the clear implication is that Cam blames his father for the loss.

A short while later, the two escaped convicts show up at the cabin and ask to use the phone, claiming that their car has broken down. Red, who is introduced as Frank's adult son, makes a point of taking up the hospitality offered, using that excuse to remain in the house (over Frank's objection). As the evening progresses Frank seems to be forcing Del into a challenge. Tensions are high, as Frank makes his play for Alpha of the house. At one point, D.J. goes so far as to suggest that "we all just whip 'em out and get this over with."

The police show up looking for the two escaped convicts, and things get tense very quickly. It soon becomes clear that Cam knew the convicts and has had some sort of entanglement with them. The family must reconcile and put aside their issues with each other to deal with the menacing force of Frank. Tragedy ensues in the film's final few moments, good vanquishes evil, and father and sons are reconciled.

== Cast ==
- Jason Behr as Campbell "Cam" Farraday
  - Andreas Michael Lamelas as Young Campbell "Cam" Farraday
- Robert Glen Keith as D.J. Farraday
  - Kenny Cloutier as Young D.J. Farraday
- Dean Stockwell as Del Farraday
- James Remar as Frank Dabbo
- Jaimz Woolvett as "Red" Tenney
- Marianna Elliott as Trooper MacIntosh
- Rondell Sheridan as Trooper Dixon
- Nancy Sawyer as Jaimie Cutter
- Joseph Kell as Gary Desoto
- Thomas G. Waites as John Willio Farraday
- Andrew Cooper as Billy
- Brenda James as Ginny Farley (scenes deleted)
- John Heff as Auditor (uncredited)

== Production and releases ==
Rites of Passage was the first film from Salva since the controversy surrounding his film, Powder (1995), which was the target of boycotts due to Disney's hiring of Salva to direct the film after his conviction for molesting a 12-year-old child actor during the production of his previous film, Clownhouse, in 1988.

Salva based much of the dialogue between Del, D.J. and Cam on tense conversations he and his own father had while Salva was growing up.

Two versions of the film have been released. A director's cut of the film with commentary by Salva and Behr was released by Bell Canyon Entertainment on May 2, 2000. This version of the film features several deleted scenes which further explain the relationships between the major characters. A theatrical release version was released by Wolfe Video on August 30, 2000. This edition contains no commentaries.
