= Charles Agron =

American actor

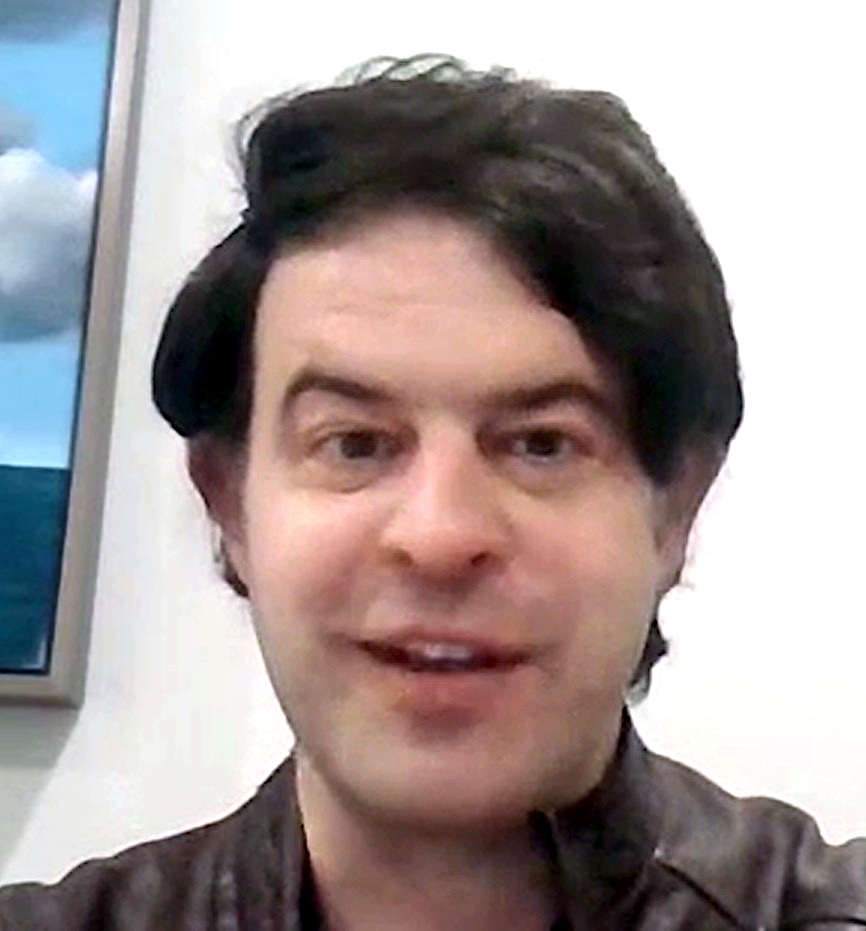
Charles Agron 2024

Charles Agron is an American film producer, screenwriter, and actor working in horror and thriller. He frequently works with Tobin Bell, Lance Henriksen, and Don E. FauntLeRoy.

== Career ==
In his early career, Agron made many short films, including "Dark House", on which he based his feature writing debut, 2014's Dark House. He was introduced to screenwriter Victor Salva by cinematographer Don E. FauntLeRoy, and they co-wrote the feature together, with Agron producing through his Charles Agron Productions banner. Critics felt it had strong performances but weaker writing. Working in horror, Agron said he is inspired by Stephen King and particularly The Shining.

In 2015, Agron founded film distribution company K Street Pictures, with the Charles Agron Productions banner under it producing in-house releases. Their first release was Monday at 11:01 A.M., which Agron produced, wrote, and starred in as lead Michael, a man who loses sense of time. Critics said that, while the film borrows from other works of the genre, Agron's screenwriting was good, though not his acting.

Agron will play the lead in the upcoming film Altered Reality, which he also wrote and produced.

K Street have released films including Alex & Eve, Last Call, and documentary And The Winner Isn't..., which Agron also produced.
