= Altered reality =

Altered reality may refer to:

- Recreational drug use
- Augmented reality
- Altered Reality (film)
