= Phyllis Dixey =

English singer, actress, dancer, impresario (1914–1964)

- Dixey at the height of her fame
- Born: 10 February 1914; Merton, Surrey, England
- Died: 2 June 1964 (aged 50); Epsom, Surrey, England
- Occupations: Singer; actress; dancer; impresario
- Years active: 1930s–1958

Phyllis Dixey (10 February 1914 – 2 June 1964) was an English singer, actress, dancer, and impresario.

Her earlier career was as a singer in variety shows in Britain. During World War II, she joined ENSA and entertained the British forces. She sang, recited and posed in naked tableaux which were very popular.

== Early life and career ==
Phyllis Selina Dixey was born in Merton, Surrey, to Ernest Dixey and Phyllis Selina Haycroft. She had one elder brother, Ernest Dixey (born 1912). In 1938, she married Jack Tracey.

In 1942, she formed her own company of girls and rented the Whitehall Theatre in London to put on a revue called The Whitehall Follies. This was the first striptease show put on in the West End of London but not the first show to have nude studies, as the Windmill reviews were already in existence. She stayed at the Whitehall for the next five years producing the Peek-a-boo reviews. Her performance was at the time considered artistic and she thought that it was an art form. She was known as the "Queen of Striptease". She appeared in two films: Love up the Pole (1936) and Dual Alibi (1947).

Poster advertising Dixey's act: the Hippodrome at Aldershot (1955)

== Last years ==
By 1947, the tastes of the London audience had changed, and Phyllis Dixey was forced to return to the provinces. She was not able to adapt to the direction that the public required, leaving the stage in the late 1950s, bankrupt. In the early 1960s, she worked as a cook at Loseley Park near Guildford. She died of cancer in 1964, aged 50, in Epsom, Surrey.

== Posthumous ==
Her life was portrayed in the British television film The One and Only Phyllis Dixey (1978), by Philip Purser, in which she was played by Lesley-Anne Down.

In 2011, English Heritage made plans to erect a blue plaque at Dixey's former home at Wentworth Court in Surbiton; however, the installation of the plaque was turned down by the residents' association of the building due to the proposed title 'Striptease Artiste' being used on the plaque.

== Filmography ==
- Love Up the Pole (1936)
- Dual Alibi (1947)
