= Alex McKenna =

American actress and voice-over artist

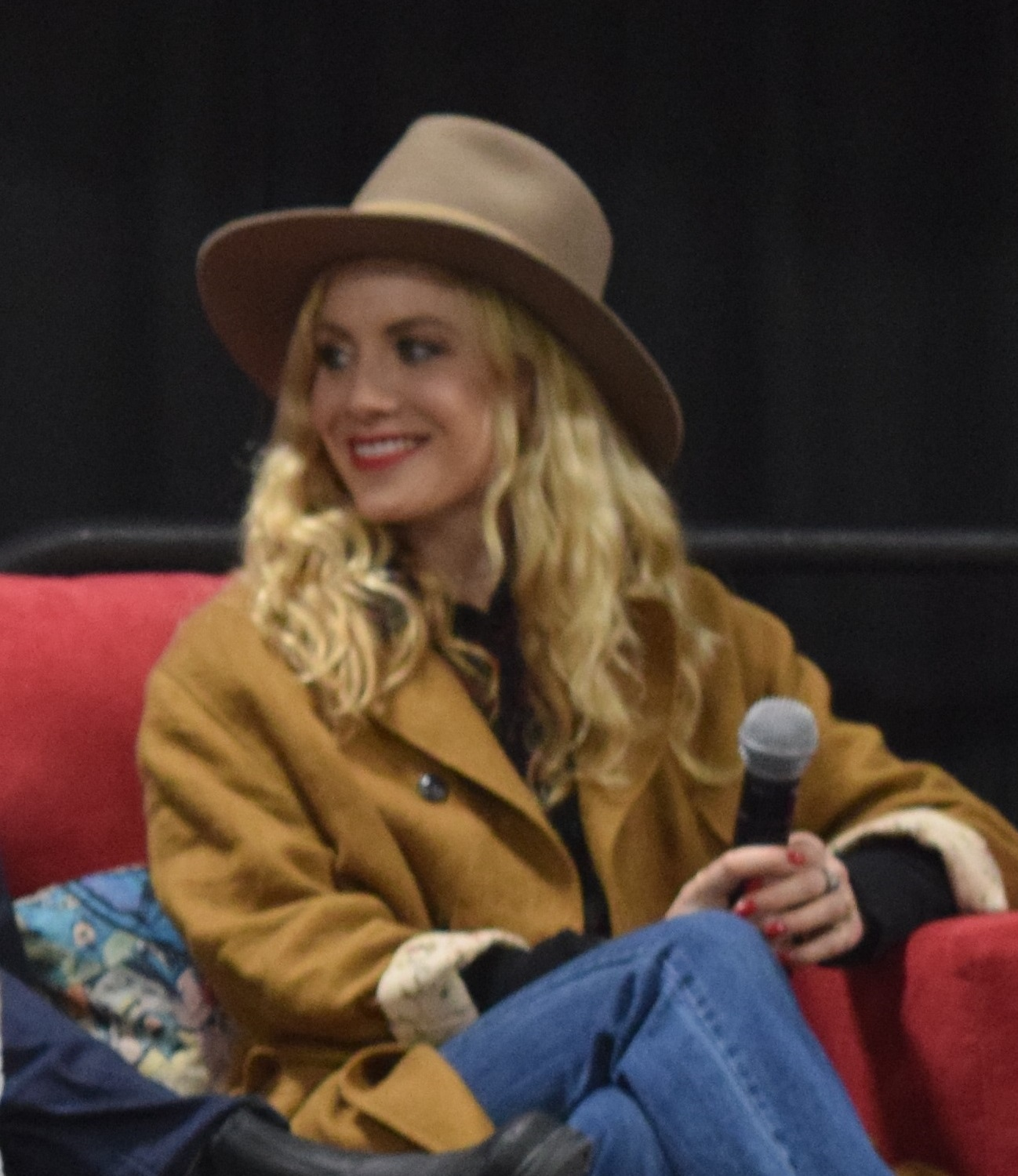
- McKenna in 2019
- Born: October 15, 1984 (age 41)
- Occupation: Actress
- Years active: 1992–present
- Known for: Abby Macy on Crossing Jordan; Sadie Adler in Red Dead Redemption 2
- Spouse: Joshua Close (m. 2016)

Signature
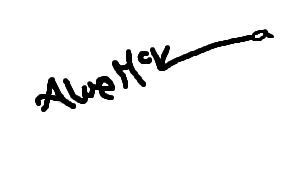

Alex McKenna (born October 15, 1984) is an American actress and voice-over artist. She gained fame by playing Petunia Stupid in The Stupids (1996) and Mickey Apple in You Wish (1997). She resumed her acting career with guest appearances in The CW hit teen drama series 90210 in 2010. In 2012, she had recurring appearances in the television series, including Dallas, Guys with Kids, and Two and a Half Men. McKenna is also known for her role as Sadie Adler in the video game Red Dead Redemption 2 (2018).

== Early life and career ==
Alex McKenna was born on October 15, 1984. She began her career as a child actress, portraying Petunia Stupid in the adventure comedy film The Stupids (1996). She had roles as Amanda in the horror film Campfire Tales (1997) and as Linda Ross in Joey (1997). In 1998, she was nominated for Best Performance in a TV Comedy Series (You Wish) in Young Artist Awards. She had a small role as Alex's friend in the comedy film What Women Want (2000). The film earned $374 million worldwide, and received largely positive reviews. She portrayed a drug-addicted teenager Abby Macy in NBC's crime drama series Crossing Jordan. She appeared in several guest starring television roles, including 90210, Malcolm in the Middle, Shake It Up, Common Law, Two and a Half Men, Guys with Kids and Boston Public.

In 2009, she played the lead role of Megs in short film The City of Lights. Next McKenna landed a recurring role in the TNT revival of the CBS prime-time soap opera, Dallas. In 2014, she appeared in the horror film Haunted along with Luke Kleintank and Lesley-Anne Down. She had a supporting role as Tammy in Bear with Us (2016). The film also earned McKenna numerous awards, including Jury Award for Best Supporting Actress at Sunscreen Film Festival. She appeared opposite Josh Radnor in the drama film The Seeker (2016), portraying Grace. In 2018, she starred in the video game Red Dead Redemption 2 as the voice and motion capture actress of Sadie Adler, and she made a guest appearance on an episode of drama thriller television series Quantico in the episode "Heaven's Fall".

== Personal life ==
McKenna married Canadian actor Joshua Close in August 2016 in Calistoga, California.

== Filmography ==
=== Film ===
Year	Film	Role	Notes
1996	A Woman Undone	Jennifer	
1996	The Stupids	Petunia Stupid	
1997	Joey	Linda Ross	
1997	Campfire Tales	Amanda	
1997	Heart of Fire	Katy Stoler	
1998	Safety Patrol	Hannah Zapruder	Also known as Disney's Safety Patrol
2000	What Women Want	Alex's Friend	
2009	The City of Lights	Megs	Short film
2012	The Longer Day of Happiness	Elizabeth	
2013	Stand By	Jenny	Short film
2013	The Freemason	Rana Burkhalter	
2014	Haunted	Eve	
2015	Single in South Beach	Gina	
2015	Other People's Children	Jillian	
2016	Bear with Us	Tammy	
2016	The Seeker	Grace	
2016	Folk Hero & Funny Guy	Stacy	
2016	Flatbush Luck	Zoey	
2016	We	Eleanor	Short film
2016	Julianne	N/A	Short film
2016	1, 2, 3... You Please.	Jesse	Short film
2017	Sensum	Dom	Short film
2018	Magnetic Plasma for mass(es) Enlightenment	Crystals	Short film
2018	Anthem of a Teenage Prophet	Ms. Banks	

=== Television ===
Year	Title	Role	Notes
1992	Middle Ages	Hillary Cooper	3 episodes
1993	The Trouble with Larry	Lindsay Flatt	Recurring character
1994	Winnetka Road	Leah Barker	Recurring character
1997–1998	You Wish	Mickey Apple	13 episodes
1997	TGIF	Mickey Apple	Episode: "Frightful Halloween Bash"
1998	Recess	C.J. Rotweiler (voice)	Episode: "The Challenge"
2000	Boston Public	Melissa	Episode: "Chapter Seven"
2001	Malcolm in the Middle	Beth Ballard	Episode: "Bowling"
2001–2006	Crossing Jordan	Abby Macy	12 episodes
2010	90210	Cat	3 episodes
2011	Shake It Up	Sarah	Episode: "Review It Up"
2012–2014	The Legend of Korra	Senna / Additional Voices (voice)	7 episodes
2012–2013	Dallas	Rebecca Sutter	4 episodes
2012	Guys with Kids	Megan	Episode: "Pilot"
2012	Two and a Half Men	Michelle	Episode: "That's Not What They Call It in Amsterdam"
2012	Sketchy	Rudolph / Little Boy / Ariel (voice)	Episodes: "The Hobbit: An Unexpected Christmas", "Prawn Stars"
2012	Common Law	Irene	Episode: "Pilot"
2015	After Ever After	Aurora	Episode: "Aurora and Phillip"
2015	The Following	Jewel	Episodes: "Demons", "Evermore"
2016	Code Black	Caroline Stringer	Episode: "Blood Sport"
2018	Quantico	Jocelyn Turner	Episode: "Heaven's Fall"

=== Video games ===
Year	Title	Role	Notes
2018	Red Dead Redemption 2	Sadie Adler	Performance capture
2019	Red Dead Online	Sadie Adler	Performance capture
2026	Star Wars Zero Company	Cly Kullervo, Rhy Cesca, Additional Voices	

== Awards and nominations ==
Year	Group	Award	Work	Result
1998	Young Artist Awards	Best Performance in a TV Comedy Series–Supporting Young Actress	You Wish	Nominated
2016	Sunscreen Film Festival	Best Supporting Actress	Bear with Us	Won
2016	Orlando Film Festival	Best Ensemble Cast in a Feature Film (shared with the cast)	Bear with Us	Won
2016	FilmQuest	Best Supporting Actress	Bear with Us	Won
2017	North Hollywood Cinefest	Best Actress in a Feature Film	Bear with Us	Won
2019	NAVGTR Awards	Supporting Performance in a Drama	Red Dead Redemption II	Nominated
