= Monday at 11:01 A.M. =

- Film poster
- Directed by: Harvey Lowry
- Written by: Charles Agron
- Story by: Charles Agron
- Produced by: Gary Adelman; Charles Agron
- Starring: Charles Agron
- Cinematography: Emmanuel Vouniozos
- Edited by: John Blizek
- Music by: Corey Allen Jackson
- Production company: Charles Agron Productions
- Distributed by: K Street Pictures
- Release date: February 5, 2016
- Running time: 96 minutes
- Country: United States
- Language: English

Monday at 11:01 A.M. is a 2016 American thriller film directed by Harvey Lowry and starring Charles Agron.

The film is a suspense thriller about Michael, who brings his girlfriend Jenny to a beautiful yet strange mountain town where everyone seems familiar. But he begins to see and hear things that no one else can. After many hallucinations and then losing sight of Jenny, Michael is brought to the brink of insanity. He finds himself frantically questioning what is real and what it isn't.

== Cast ==
- Charles Agron as Michael
- Lauren Shaw as Jenny
- Lance Henriksen as The Bartender
- Briana Evigan as Olivia
