= Heart of Fire (1997 film) =

- Directed by: John Power
- Written by: George Rubino
- Produced by: Jean O'Neill
- Starring: Patrick Duffy; Alex McKenna
- Cinematography: Dan Burstall
- Edited by: Sabrina Plisco-Morris
- Music by: George S. Clinton
- Release date: 1997
- Running time: 86 minutes
- Country: United States
- Language: English

Heart of Fire is a 1997 American TV film filmed in Queensland, Australia. It stars Patrick Duffy as a firefighter trying to save a girl trapped by a gas truck-trailer. It is based on a true story.

== Cast ==
- Patrick Duffy as Max Tucker
- Steve Jacobs as Fire Captain
- Troy Winbush as Thorsen
- Kerry Armstrong as Sue Tucker
- Joy Smithers as Julie Stoler
- Alex McKenna as Katy Stoler
- Alarna Jenkins as Laurie Tucker
- Natasha Sakkas as Chrissie Tucker

== Reception ==
Writing in Variety Bob Scott says "it’s the persuasive McKenna, refugee from the late “The Trouble With Harry,” (sic) who grabs the screen. She’s sharp as the pre-accident pre-teener, but as the trapped child, she’s terrif. She and Duffy make an admirable team in a vidpic too likely to be passed over as just another disaster excursion." John Martin in the Kennebec Journal writes "The special effects are impressive — it must have been a dangerous movie to make — and Duffy plays the ordinary guy quite well." Bob Sokolsky of The Press-Enterprise says the film "has enough action and excitement to overcome most of the weaknesses tied into an awkward story line and a clumsy subplot involving Duffy's character and his estranged family." Chicago Sun-Times' Lon Grahnke gave it 3 stars.
