= Gordon Wharmby =

British actor (1933–2002)

- Wharmby with Thora Hird in Last of the Summer Wine
- Born: 6 November 1933; Salford, Lancashire, England
- Died: 18 May 2002 (aged 68); Abergele, Conwy, Wales
- Occupation: Actor
- Years active: 1977–2002

Gordon Wharmby (6 November 1933 – 18 May 2002) was an English television actor. He was best known for the role of Wesley Pegden on Last of the Summer Wine.

He was born in Salford, Lancashire, in 1933, and served in the Royal Air Force during his national service. Wharmby was originally employed as a painter and decorator and had no formal training as an actor. He gained stage experience with Oldham Repertory Theatre and worked part-time as a jobbing actor. Early television roles included bit-parts in programmes such as Bill Brand (1976), The One and Only Phyllis Dixey (1978), and Coronation Street (1982), and Heartbeat (1994).

Wharmby made his debut in Last of the Summer Wine in 1982, after initially auditioning for a one-line part and impressing director Alan J.W. Bell. Bell cast him as boilersuit wearing, tinkering mechanic and would-be inventor Wesley Pegden. Wharmby appeared as a regular cast member for 16 series between 1985 and 2002 alongside Dame Thora Hird as his nagging wife, Edie, from 1986. Although initially overawed at working with Hird, Wharmby eventually started giving her "notes", to the veteran actress's great amusement.

Wharmby had small roles in programmes such as Troy Kennedy Martin's nuclear thriller Edge of Darkness (1985), Brookside (1985), All Creatures Great and Small (1988), A Very British Coup (1988), Coronation Street as a milkman (1982) Agatha Christie's Poirot (1990), Minder (1991), Heartbeat (1994), and Hetty Wainthropp Investigates (1996).

At his time of death, he had been due to start recording the 24th series of Last of the Summer Wine.

Wharmby died of lung cancer on 18 May 2002, aged 68. Wharmby and his wife Muriel had no children.
