= Mercenary for Justice =

- DVD cover
- Directed by: Don E. FauntLeRoy
- Written by: Steve Collins
- Produced by: Randall Emmett; George Furla
- Starring: Steven Seagal; Jacqueline Lord; Roger Guenveur Smith; Luke Goss; Michael K. Williams; Langley Kirkwood; Vivien Bieldt; Adrian Galley; Bruce Young; Verity Price
- Cinematography: Don E. FauntLeRoy
- Edited by: Robert A. Ferretti
- Music by: Stephen Edwards
- Production company: Luminosity Films Emmett/Furla Films
- Distributed by: Millennium Films
- Release date: April 18, 2006
- Running time: 96 minutes
- Countries: United States; South Africa
- Language: English
- Budget: $15,000,000

Mercenary for Justice is a 2006 action thriller film directed and shot by Don E. FauntLeRoy. It stars Steven Seagal, Luke Goss, Jacqueline Lord and Roger Guenveur Smith. The film was released direct-to-video on April 18, 2006. Principal photography was on location in Cape Town, South Africa.

== Plot ==
CIA dirty deeds man John Dresham and black ops organiser Anthony Chapel hire mercenary John Seeger and his crew for a mission in the French-controlled Galmoral Island in Southern Africa. Ostensibly, the purpose of the operation is to aid the local population, though in reality Dresham and Chapel plan to seize and profit off the island's rich oil and diamond reserves.

Seeger gets steamed when the mission goes wrong. Some of his soldiers, against Seeger's orders, take the French Ambassador and his family hostage for leverage and later blow them all up. French troops arrive and attack the mercenaries, resulting in his best friend "Radio" Jones being killed. Maxine Barnol, his spy posing as a journalist, suggests CIA involvement.

Seeger heads back to the United States and goes to the home of Radio's wife Shondra, tells her the news, and then promises her that he will take care of her and her young son Eddie. While there he kills two of Dresham's men sent to kill him and discovers Dresham's implication.

Chapel again hires the team of mercenaries, kidnapping Shondra and Eddie to force John into cooperating. The mission involves rescuing Kamal Dasan, the son of prominent gun runner Ahmet Dasan, who has been arrested and thrown into the Randveld Prison outside of Cape Town, South Africa, and is due to be extradited to the United States.

Dresham discovers the job but not its object and when he bumps into Maxine he forces her to work for him instead of Chapel. Maxine leads him to believe that the target is the safe of a bank in Cape Town and Dresham uses his CIA influence to be shown round the security installation. Maxine listens attentively and takes photos.

Seeger leads Dresham in circles but when the mercenaries break into the prison they discover that Kamal is not there any more. In the Cape Town bank, Seeger persuades the Greek government to arrest Kamal's father, then escapes making sure Dresham will be arrested too.

Finally, with a few loyal members of his team, John rescues Shondra and Eddie and kills Chapel and his guards.

== Cast ==
- Steven Seagal as John Seeger
- Jacqueline Lord as Maxine Barnol
- Roger Guenveur Smith as Anthony Chapel
- Luke Goss as John Dresham
- Adrian Galley as "Bulldog"
- Michael Kenneth Williams as Samuel Kay
- Langley Kirkwood as Kruger
- Vivien Bieldt as Dekerk
- Bruce Young as Chief Spono Malik
- Verity Price as Female Assistant
- Peter Butler as Ahmet Dasan
- Tumi Mogoje as Eddie Jones
- Faye Peters as Shondra Jones
- Zaa Nkweta as "Radio" Jones
- Ivaylo Geraskov as French Colonel
- Shirly Brener as TV Reporter
- Rudiger Eberle as French Ambassador
- Jeannie de Gouveia as Bank Receptionist
- Leslie Anne Down as Newscaster (uncredited)

== Production ==
Filming took 28 days. The director later said "the story was confusing because there were four writers on the film and things were left over from draft to draft. I pointed all this out to the producers, but they did not care. Also, the producers cut scene number 101 from the shooting schedule that played right in the middle of the film it caused a domino effect before and after. That scene was the tie-up in the movie. I talked until I was blue in the face trying to convince them the decision was a huge mistake. They did not care."

Fauntleroy said scene 101 was where Maxine and Seeger meet up and set the plan in motion to expose Chapel and Dresham. "A fight sequence was to take place as Seeger left the Hotel where Seagal had to take on four guys so Maxine could slip away."

Fauntleroy claims the producers "just hated Steven and their whole existence was to destroy him, staff of personal, and the film."

=== Lawsuit ===
Fauntleroy claimed the day he arrived on the film the producers "showed me a law suit that had already been prepared and was ready to file if Steven gave them any problems."

Nu Image, Inc., and Kill Master Productions sued Seagal for $14 million, claiming the actor caused production delays on the set of "Mercenary" and a second film, Today You Die by routinely arriving late on the set, rewriting the script and allowing members of his entourage to interfere with the work of crew members. The lawsuit was settled out of court.
