= Rosewood Lane =

- Theatrical release poster
- Directed by: Victor Salva
- Written by: Victor Salva
- Produced by: Nadine DeBarros; Don E. FauntLeRoy; Phillip B. Goldfine; Victor Salva
- Starring: Rose McGowan; Lauren Vélez; Lesley-Anne Down; Ray Wise
- Cinematography: Don E. FauntLeRoy
- Edited by: Ed Marx
- Music by: Bennett Salvay
- Production companies: Hollywood Media Bridge; Voltage Pictures
- Distributed by: VVS Films; Tanweer Films
- Release date: October 14, 2011
- Running time: 91 minutes
- Country: United States
- Language: English
- Budget: $600,000

Rosewood Lane is a 2011 American thriller-horror film written and directed by Victor Salva, and stars Rose McGowan. The film's story revolves around a radio talk show psychiatrist who moves back to her hometown and notices her neighborhood paper boy's unusual behavior. The official trailer of the film was released on the October 14, 2011.

== Plot ==
The story follows Dr. Sonny Blake, a radio talk show psychiatrist, when she moves back to her childhood home after her alcoholic father dies. Once back in her old neighborhood, she meets the local paperboy, a cunning, depraved sociopath who targeted her father and now targets her. When the boy starts calling her show and reciting eerie nursery rhymes, an unnerving game of cat-and-mouse begins. When the game escalates, she suddenly finds herself in an all-out war, one that forces her to redefine her ideas of good and evil, and has her fighting to stay alive.

== Cast ==
- Rose McGowan as Sonny Blake
- Daniel Ross Owens as Derek Barber/Paperboy
- Sonny Marinelli as Barrett Tanner
- Lauren Vélez as Paula Crenshaw
- Ray Wise as Det. Briggs
- Tom Tarantini as Det. Mike Sabatino
- Rance Howard as Fred Crumb
- Steve Tom as Glenn Forrester
- Lesley-Anne Down as Dr. Cloey Talbot
- Lin Shaye as Mrs. Hawthorne
- Bill Fagerbakke as Hank Hawthorne
- Judson Mills as Darren Summers

== Release ==
=== Home media ===
The film was released on DVD and Blu-ray on September 11, 2012. The film was released again on Blu-ray by Mill Creek Entertainment on February 11, 2020 in a double feature with White Noise: The Light (2007), the latter making its United States Blu-ray debut.

== Reception ==
Sean Decker of the Dread Central gave Rosewood Lane 1 out of 5 stars, saying "the film is rife with baffling plot turns, characters who consistently make the most illogical of decisions, abandoned sub-plots (and players), plot holes a'plenty and a second act sequence that betrays the third reel's reveal (a reveal that ultimately makes little sense anyway)".
