= Ladykillers (film) =

- Genre: Action; Thriller; Crime
- Written by: Gregory S. Dinallo
- Directed by: Robert Michael Lewis
- Starring: Marilu Henner; Susan Blakely; Thomas Calabro; Lesley-Anne Down
- Theme music composer: Mark Snow
- Country of origin: United States
- Original language: English

Production
- Executive producer: Barry J. Weitz
- Producer: Andrew Hill
- Production location: Los Angeles
- Cinematography: Thomas Del Ruth
- Editor: J. P. Farrell
- Running time: 96 min.
- Production companies: ABC Circle Films; Barry Weitz Films

Original release
- Network: ABC
- Release: November 9, 1988

Ladykillers is a 1988 television film, directed by Robert Michael Lewis, and starring Lesley-Anne Down, Marilu Henner, Susan Blakely, and Keith David as Abe. The film score was composed by Mark Snow.

The plot of this film is unconnected with The Ladykillers (1955) or the 2004 remake of the same name.

== Plot ==
The scene takes place in a male striptease club of Los Angeles, where the performers are being murdered by an unknown female assailant.

There are multiple suspects: Morganna King, the owner of the club; Lilah Corbett, the club's promot and the head stripper, who has mysteriously disappeared after being fired.

Unable to gain a lead, investigating officer Lt. Cavanaugh goes undercover as a stripper in an attempt to trap the murderer, eventually starring in the titular "Ladykillers" show, but he is almost killed in the process.

== Critical reception ==
The film received poor reviews. The Los Angeles Times deemed Ladykillers "inept," writing that the script was simply "an excuse for a male flesh parade." The New York Times called the film "leering" and "prurient."
