= Dual Alibi =

1947 British film by Alfred Travers

- Directed by: Alfred Travers
- Written by: Vivienne Adès; Stephen Clarkson; Alfred Travers
- Based on: an original story by Renalt Capes
- Produced by: Louis H. Jackson
- Starring: Herbert Lom; Phyllis Dixey; Terence De Marney; Ronald Frankau
- Cinematography: James Wilson
- Edited by: Monica Kimick
- Music by: Stanley Black
- Production company: British National Films
- Distributed by: Pathé Pictures International (UK)
- Release dates: 3 June 1947 (London, England)
- Running time: 81 minutes
- Country: United Kingdom
- Language: English

Dual Alibi is a 1947 British drama film directed by Alfred Travers and starring Herbert Lom, Phyllis Dixey and Terence De Marney. It is a film noir. It was written by Vivienne Adès, Stephen Clarkson and Travers, and made by British National Films at Elstree Studios.

== Synopsis ==
A top French acrobatic act, the de Lisle twins, are hired by a British promoter to perform in his Blackpool show. While they are working there one of the twins falls in love with a cigarette girl and aspiring singer named Penny. After the twins win the French lottery she steals their ticket, with the help of a spivish publicity agent, and goes to Paris to claim the prize. The twins follow them to seek revenge.

== Cast ==
- Herbert Lom as Jules de Lisle / Georges de Lisle
- Phyllis Dixey as Penny aka Gloria Gregg
- Terence De Marney as Mike Bergen
- Ronald Frankau as Vincent Barney
- Abraham Sofaer as French Judge
- Eugene Deckers as French ringmaster
- The Cromwell Brothers as trapeze act
- Ben Williams as Charlie
- Clarence Wright as M. Mangan
- Beryl Measor as Gwen
- Harold Berens as Ali
- Sebastian Cabot as Loterie Nationale official
- Andreas Malandrinos as French Judge
- Marcel Poncin as French lawyer
- Wallas Eaton as court official
- Gerald Rex as call boy
- Margaret Withers as Blackpool landlady
- H.G. Guinle
- Leonard Sharp
- Ernst Ulman
- Eric Mason
- Griffiths Moss
- Gerald Conway

== Reception ==
The Monthly Film Bulletin wrote: "The basic idea of the film is not original, but Herbert Lom makes the dual role impressive and convincing. Terence de Marney as the 'spiv-type' Bergen is admirable, but Phyllis Dixey gives him poor support and her acting lacks polish. The scenes at Blackpool and in the circus are realistic, but it is a pity that early shots of people applauding and of the trapeze act should have been repeated in later sequences of the film."

Kine Weekly wrote: "The film is not exactly a classic but it is, nevertheless, a sound job of work. The story ... has plenty of action and colour, while sex cunningly illuminates its hectic design. Its circus atmosphere can't be faulted and the doubling of the Cromwell Brothers for Herbert Lom is as clever as the double-exposure photography, Technically, it is first rate."

Variety wrote: "With a little more expenditure on production and wiser casting, picture would have rated better playing time than it probably will receive. However, Herbert Lom's acting makes it acceptable drama. Greatest defect is the casting of Phyllis Dixey as femme lead."
