= Griffiths Moss =

British actor (1879–1957)

Stanley Griffiths Moss (1879–1957) was a British actor, mainly in supporting roles.

== Life ==
He was born Stanley George Moss on 1 July 1879 in Gloucester.

In the 1920s he appears as leader of Catlin's Royal Pierrots at Lea's Pavilion in Folkestone. Around the same time he turned his hand to writing music, composing a foxtrot: "Under the Shadow of The Orme". He appears to have spent his life in the entertainment industry, mainly vaudeville, and only entered the film industry after the Second World War at age 67.

He died in Lambeth London on 14 August 1957 aged 78.

== Film roles ==
see

- The Laughing Lady (1946) as Major Domo
- Woman to Woman (1947) as Sylvia's butler
- Dual Alibi (1947) as the actor
- Portrait of Clare (1950) as Bates
