= The One and Only Phyllis Dixey =

- Genre: Drama
- Written by: Philip Purser
- Directed by: Michael Tuchner
- Starring: Lesley-Anne Down, Michael Elphick, Patricia Hodge
- Composer: Alfred Ralston
- Country of origin: United Kingdom
- Original language: English

Production
- Producer: Jenny Wilkes
- Running time: 110 minutes
- Production company: Thames Television

Original release
- Network: ITV
- Release: 1 November 1978

The One and Only Phyllis Dixey is a 1978 British television film directed by Michael Tuchner and starring Lesley-Anne Down, Michael Elphick and Patricia Hodge. Based on the career of the burlesque artist Phyllis Dixey, it was produced by Thames Television for screening on ITV.

== Cast ==
- Lesley-Anne Down as Phyllis Dixey
- Christopher Murney as Jack Tracy
- Michael Elphick as Wallace Parnell
- Jacqueline Tong as Judy
- Elaine Paige as Kim
- Patricia Hodge as Maisie
- Rosalind Wilson as Penny
- Gillian Hayes as Jane
- Joanne Whalley as Doris
- Gretchen Franklin as Phyllis's Dresser
- Sue Holderness as Mildred Challenger
- Richard LeParmentier as G.I. at Box Office
- Geoffrey Lumsden as Judge
- Shane Rimmer as US Colonel
- Gordon Wharmby as Simmons
- Peter Settelen as Father McGuire
- Gillian Taylforth as Girl in café

== Bibliography ==
- Newcomb, Horace . Encyclopedia of Television. Routledge, 2014.
- Potter, Jeremy. Independent Television in Britain: Volume 4: Companies and Programmes, 1968–80. Palgrave Macmillan, 1990.
