= Dark House (2014 film) =

American horror film

- Promotional poster
- Directed by: Victor Salva
- Written by: Victor Salva; Charles Agron
- Based on: "Dark House" by Charles Agron
- Produced by: Charles Agron; Don E. FauntLeRoy; Steve Nguyen; Victor Salva
- Starring: Tobin Bell; Lesley-Anne Down; Luke Kleintank; Alex McKenna
- Cinematography: Don E. FauntLeRoy
- Edited by: Ed Marx
- Music by: Benson Taylor
- Production company: Charles Agron Productions
- Distributed by: Paladin
- Release date: March 14, 2014
- Running time: 103 minutes
- Country: United States
- Language: English

Dark House (also known as Haunted) is a 2014 American horror film directed by Victor Salva and starring Tobin Bell, Lesley-Anne Down and Luke Kleintank. The film follows a man named Nick Di Santo, who discovers that not only is his long-lost father alive, but that he may be able to explain the source of his clairvoyant abilities.

== Plot ==
The film tells the story of Nick Di Santo (Kleintack), who is tormented by his ability to touch someone and see exactly how they will die. On his 23rd birthday, Nick is summoned by his mother Lillian (Down) to the asylum where she has been institutionalized since his childhood. Hoping that her request to see him is a sign of improvement, Nick is stunned by her revelation that the father he thought was long dead is really alive, and that he may know the origin of Nick's terrible gift. Nick sets out to find his father with the help of his best friend Ryan (Anthony Rey Perez) and pregnant girlfriend Eve (Alex McKenna). Every road they take on the journey leads them back to the same abandoned mansion—a house that only existed in Nick's childhood imagination, or so he thought. While running away from the haunted house, undead and very dirty freaks try to kill them with axes and large blades. Finally succumbing to the will of the house, Nick becomes embroiled in a battle with a dark figure (Bell). In the end, Lillian appears to Nick, telling him to go to the cellar and find his answers. The film ends without telling us if Nick ever makes it to the cellar or not. It is left to the viewer to decide.

== Cast ==
- Luke Kleintank as Nick Di Santo
- Alex McKenna as Eve
- Anthony Rey Perez as Ryan
- Zack Ward as Chris McCulluch
- Lacey Anzelc as Lillith
- Ethan S. Smith as Sam
- Lesley-Anne Down as Lilian Di Santo
- Tobin Bell as Seth
- Charles Agron as Lucky
- Daniel Ross Owens as Brian Maker
- Max Gail as Scott
- Patricia Belcher as Lee Knox
- Tony Sanford as Ben
- Cameron Spann as Robin

== Reception ==
Critical reception for Dark House has been predominantly negative and the film holds a rating of 9% on review aggregate Rotten Tomatoes, with an average rating of 2.8/10, based on 11 reviews. The New York Times and The Hollywood Reporter both panned the film, with the latter stating that "The generic title is not even the most unimaginative element of this overstuffed, cliche-ridden horror film." Nerdist News also criticized the film, as they felt that it contained too many elements that "merely clutters up a film that might find more power in being simple." As is common with Salva's films, some critics, such as John Squires of Bloody Disgusting, refused to review the film based on the director's criminal convictions for child molestation and possession of child pornography.
