= Lesley-Anne Down =

British actress (born 1954)

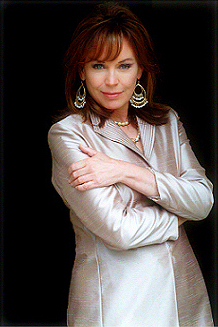
- Down in 2008
- Born: 17 March 1954 (age 72); Wandsworth, London, England
- Occupations: Actress; singer; model
- Years active: 1968–present
- Spouses: Enrique Gabriel (m. 1980; div. 1981) William Friedkin (m. 1982; div. 1985) Don E. FauntLeRoy (m. 1986)
- Partner: Bruce Robinson (1969–1979)
- Children: 2

Lesley-Anne Down (born 17 March 1954) is a British actress and singer. She made her motion picture debut in the 1969 drama film The Smashing Bird I Used to Know and later appeared in films Assault (1971), Countess Dracula (1971) and Pope Joan (1972). She achieved fame as Georgina Worsley in the ITV period drama series Upstairs, Downstairs (1973–75).

Down received further recognition for her performances in the films The Pink Panther Strikes Again (1976), A Little Night Music (1977), The First Great Train Robbery (1978), Hanover Street (1979), Rough Cut (1980), Sphinx (1981) and Nomads (1986). On television, she played the leading roles in The One and Only Phyllis Dixey (1978), The Hunchback of Notre Dame (1982), Murder Is Easy (1982), and most notably starred as Madeline Fabray in one of the highest rated miniseries in TV history North and South (1985–86), for which she was nominated for a Golden Globe Award in 1986.

In 1990, Down played the role Stephanie Rogers in the CBS drama series Dallas. During 1997–99, she played Olivia Richards in the NBC soap opera Sunset Beach. From April 2003 to February 2012, she portrayed Jackie Marone in the CBS soap opera The Bold and the Beautiful.

== Life and career ==
=== Early life ===
Down was born on 17 March 1954 and brought up in Wandsworth, London, England. She began acting and modelling, and in her teenage years won several beauty pageants. She was voted Britain's most beautiful teenager at the age of 15. Down left school at 15 and went to America for the first time at 17. In 1969, she made her feature film debut in a supporting role in the British drama sexploitation film The Smashing Bird I Used to Know.

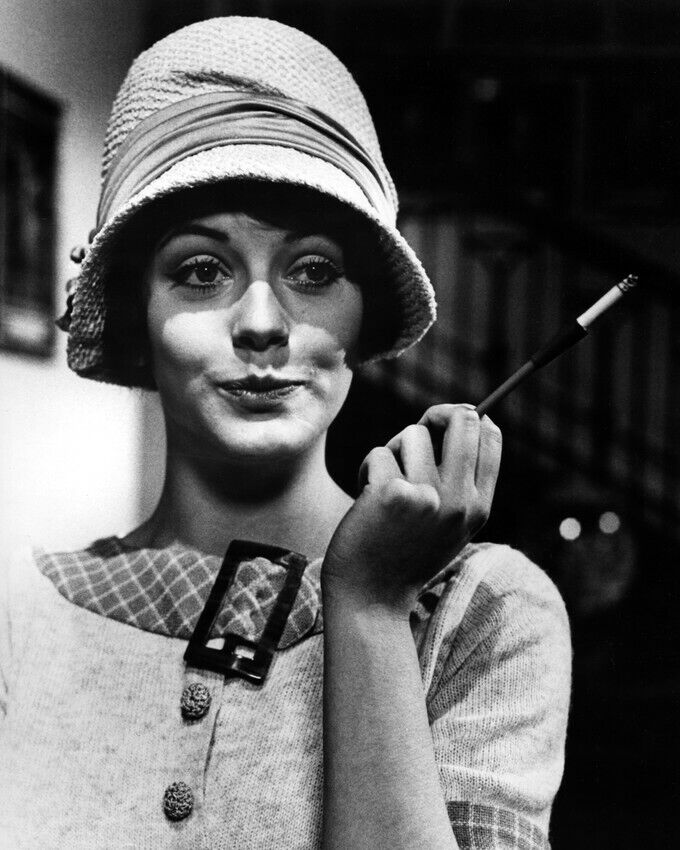
Down in Upstairs, Downstairs

=== 1970s ===
In 1971, Down guest-starred in the British television series Six Dates with Barker, Out of the Unknown, and Public Eye. Also that year, she starred in three movies: first was Countess Dracula, a horror film based on some of the legends surrounding the Countess Elizabeth Báthory playing the role of Elisabeth's daughter. She starred in the thriller film Assault playing the role of schoolgirl who was raped on her way home from school. She also had a supporting role in the 20th Century Fox's drama film All the Right Noises. In 1972, Down starred in the historical drama film Pope Joan opposite Liv Ullmann and Olivia de Havilland. In 1973, she appeared in the Western film Scalawag starring and directed by Kirk Douglas.

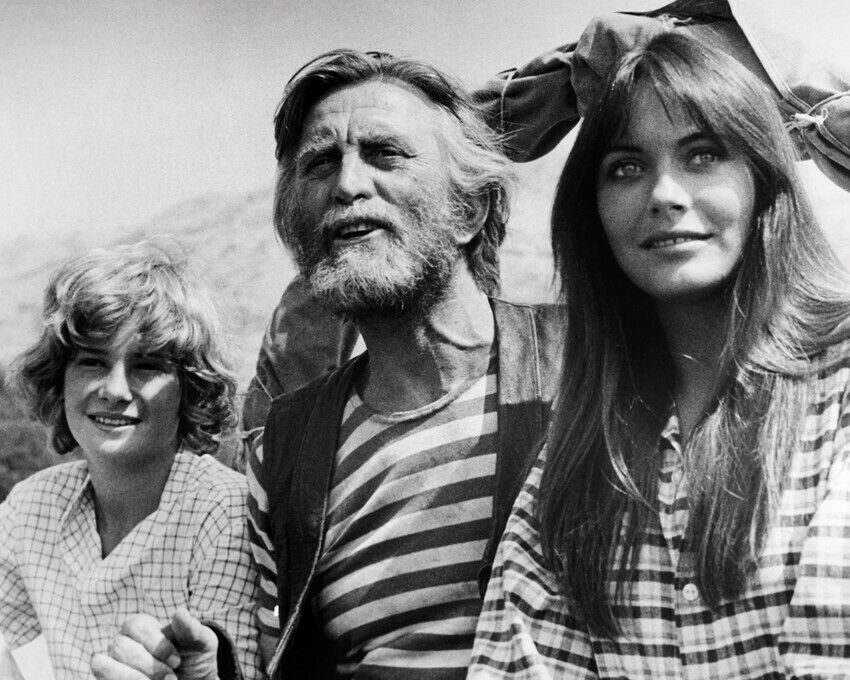
Down with Kirk Douglas and Mark Lester in Scalawag (1973)

In 1973, Down was cast as Georgina Worsley in the Emmy Award-winning British period drama series Upstairs, Downstairs. She made her debut in the episode "Goodwill to All Men" in December 1973. In 1974, she appeared in the anthology horror film From Beyond the Grave and the following year had supporting role in the action thriller Brannigan. Her television appearances includes Bedtime Stories, The Sweeney and When the Boat Comes In. Her fame led to a nude photoshoot for the magazine Mayfair in 1975. Upstairs, Downstairs was her career breakthrough; after the show ended in 1975, she moved to Hollywood and began her film career.

In 1976, Down starred in the comedy film The Pink Panther Strikes Again opposite Peter Sellers. The film was released by United Artists, received positive reviews from critics and grossed $75 million worldwide. The following year she starred in the musical comedy film A Little Night Music starring opposite Elizabeth Taylor in the adaptation of Stephen Sondheim's 1973 musical of the same name. The film received mostly negative reviews. In 1978, Down played the leading role of burlesque artist Phyllis Dixey in the BAFTA Award-nominated made-for-television drama film, The One and Only Phyllis Dixey. She appeared in the romantic drama film The Betsy and played the female lead opposite Sean Connery in the heist comedy film The First Great Train Robbery. The latter received positive reviews from critics and Downs' performance was noted by Roger Ebert of the Chicago Sun-Times. Vincent Canby of The New York Times wrote: "Mr. Sutherland, as the none-too-bright locksmith, and Miss Down, who must appear in several figuratively transparent disguises, have fun with what are, in effect, character roles. The three work together beautifully." In 1979, Down starred opposite Harrison Ford in the romantic war drama film Hanover Street, it received mixed-to-positive reviews and was considered a box-office failure.

=== 1980s ===
In 1980, Down starred opposite Burt Reynolds in the crime comedy film Rough Cut. Gary Arnold of The Washington Post wrote: "Lesley-Anne Down often looks as ravishing as Ava Gardner in her prime. The heady sensation created when her generous lips expand into a brilliant smile is an incidental pleasure well worth overindulging, but it would be even better if she had a role that permitted her more relaxation and confidence (and a costumer and hairdresser who consistently enhanced her beauty). The heroine's dialogue seems to have been contrived under the influence of vague recollections of Grace Kelly in "To Catch a Thief." The role affects an hauteur that doesn't become Lesley-Anne Down somehow. It also appears to tax her acting technique, which isn't nearly as sleek as Kelly's. I suspect that the very idea of presenting her as a bitchy-elegant society girl inhibits Down rather more than it flatters her. There are moments when she seems to stiffen up as severely as Kim Novak at her least secure." In 1981, Down went to star in the adventure film Sphinx directed by Franklin J. Schaffner and based on the 1979 novel of the same name by Robin Cook. Down played Egyptologist researching a paper about the chief architect to Pharaoh Seti in the movie. The film received mostly negative reviews from critics. Vincent Canby of The New York Times wrote: "The performers are terrible, none more so than Mr. Langella, who is supposed to be mysterious and romantic but behaves with all of the charm of a room clerk at the Nile Hilton. Miss Down spends a good deal of her time going, Eeeeeeek! and is frequently hysterical - Egyptian room service being especially maddening. At her best, she reminds one of Jacqueline Bisset, but unlike Miss Bisset, who has survived many movies like this with her identity intact, Miss Down seems to dissolve as the film lurches on. By the end, I was sure she was Jacqueline Bisset."

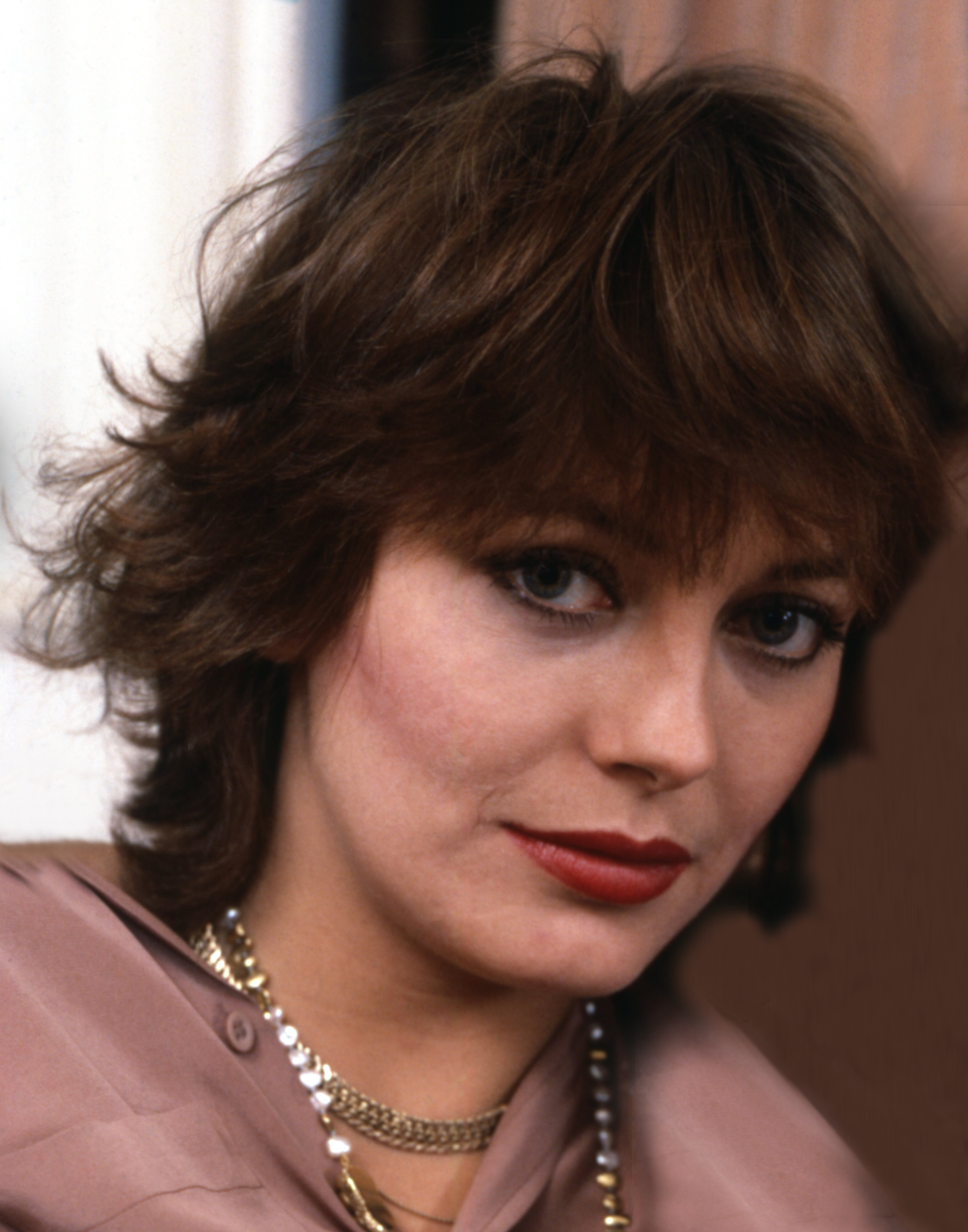
Down in 1979

After Sphinx, Down returned to television playing British socialite Unity Mitford in an episode of anthology series BBC2 Playhouse. The following year she starred in Agatha Christie' Murder Is Easy and played the role of Esméralda in an American production of The Hunchback of Notre Dame opposite Anthony Hopkins. In 1984, Down again starred with Anthony Hopkins, this time in the romantic war drama Arch of Triumph based on the novel Arch of Triumph by Erich Maria Remarque. Later that year, she appeared in the ABC miniseries The Last Days of Pompeii. She also appeared onstage in Hamlet and a musical version of Great Expectations.

In 1985, Down starred as Madeline Fabray LaMotte in the ABC miniseries North and South based on the 1980s trilogy of novels North and South by John Jakes. The following year the sequel miniseries was released. The 1985 first installment, North and South, remains the seventh-highest rated miniseries in TV history. For her performance she received positive reviews and was nominated for a Golden Globe Award for Best Supporting Actress – Television in 1986. During the filming of the miniseries, Down's divorce from film director William Friedkin received wide press coverage. Allegations of adultery, drug use and violence accompanied Down and Friedkin's acrimonious battle for full custody of their son in the divorce proceedings. In 1986, she returned to big screen starring alongside Pierce Brosnan in the horror film Nomads written and directed by John McTiernan. In 1988 she starred in the made-for-television remake of the 1958 romantic comedy Indiscreet. The Los Angeles Times said: "The vapidity of both [lead] performances is magnified by come-hither camera shots that linger too long on their empty faces... Down has a little more flounce to the ounce, but the best she can do as a woman deceived is to fly into a deep snit. Production values evoke the silky-bland noblesse oblige that has been canonized for TV by "Dynasty" and "Knots Landing"." Also that year, Down starred alongside Marilu Henner and Susan Blakely in the crime television film Ladykillers and later appeared in Night Walk (1989).

=== 1990s ===
In 1990, Down was cast as a series regular for a limited run in the CBS primetime soap opera Dallas as Stephanie Rogers. She earned a quarter of a million dollars' salary for a 10-week shoot. She starred in the unsuccessful television comedy pilot 1775 (1992) set in colonial Philadelphia during the run-up to the American Revolution. She guest-starred on the CBS series The Nanny and Diagnosis: Murder. She returned to cinema starring in the thriller film Over the Line. Down later starred in the smaller-scale films Night Trap (1993), Munchie Strikes Back (1994) In the Heat of Passion II: Unfaithful (1994), and The Secret Agent Club (1996). In 1994 she returned to her role as Madeline Fabray LaMotte in the ABC miniseries, Heaven & Hell: North & South, Book III. The final part received mostly mixed-to-negative reception, but her appearance was noted by Variety. Also in 1994, Down starred opposite Charles Bronson in the action thriller film Death Wish V: The Face of Death, the fifth and final installment in the Death Wish film series. Death Wish V was universally panned and holds a rare 0% rating on Rotten Tomatoes based on reviews from 5 critics. The following year she appeared in his made-for-television movie Family of Cops. In 1996, she appeared in the sword and sorcery television film Beastmaster III: The Eye of Braxus, a sequel to the 1982 film The Beastmaster.

In 1996, Aaron Spelling cast her as Olivia Richards on his new daytime soap opera, Sunset Beach. Her character was the mix of Sue Ellen Ewing and Alexis Colby of the 1980s prime time soaps. Ken Tucker of Entertainment Weekly wrote: "Chief among the large cast is Lesley-Anne Down, irresistible as a hooked-on-vodka matron who may or may not have murdered her lover." In 1997, for her portrayal of Olivia, Down won the award for "Best Actress" at the Soap Opera Update Awards. The series aired on NBC from January 1997 to December 1999. During the series, Down also appeared in the Rodney Dangerfield's comedy film Meet Wally Sparks (1997), and starred in the Young Hearts Unlimited (1998), a made-for-television family comedy film directed by third husband, Don E. FauntLeRoy.

=== 2000s—present ===
After the cancellation of Sunset Beach, Down appeared in films The King's Guard (2000), The Meeksville Ghost (2001) and 13th Child (2002). She starred in two Lifetime movies: The Perfect Wife (2001) and You Belong to Me (2002) based on Mary Higgins Clark's novel. In 2001, she guest-starred as Lady Sheraton in the NBC soap opera Days of Our Lives appearing in five episodes. She had cameo appearances in Don E. FauntLeRoy-directed action films Today You Die (2005) and Mercenary for Justice (2006), both starred Steven Seagal. Down wrote screenplay and starred in the 2006 comedy-drama film Seven Days of Grace. Filming began on March 17, 1996, 10 years before the eventual 2006 release of the film. The film was finally released to theaters on 1 April 2006. In 2003, Down was cast in another soap playing the role of Jackie Marone on The Bold and the Beautiful on CBS. She first appeared on 1 April 2003. In January 2012, Down confirmed that she would be departing the programme. Her final appearance was on 29 February 2012.

In 2011, Down appeared in the thriller film Rosewood Lane directed by Victor Salva with Rose McGowan, Ray Wise, and Lauren Vélez. She later starred in the horror film Dark House (2014), also directed by Victor Salva. She starred alongside Kirsten Vangsness in the period black-and-white comedy film Kill Me, Deadly playing dotty millionaire Lady Clairmont. The film was released in 2015. Also in 2015, Down appeared in another Steven Seagal action thriller, Absolution. The following year she appeared in the Lifetime movie I Am Watching You and played Jamie-Lynn Sigler' character mother in the Western film Justice. She co-starred in the Hallmark Holiday film A Cinderella Christmas in 2016. She appeared in the romantic comedy film Alex & the List in 2018 and the horror film Gates of Darkness in 2019; she co-wrote the script for the latter.

In 2020, Down moved to Atlanta, bought a ranch-style house and announced that she had retired from acting. Despite this, Down returned to work playing British Prime Minister Margaret Thatcher in the 2024 biographical film Reagan starring Dennis Quaid.

== Personal life ==
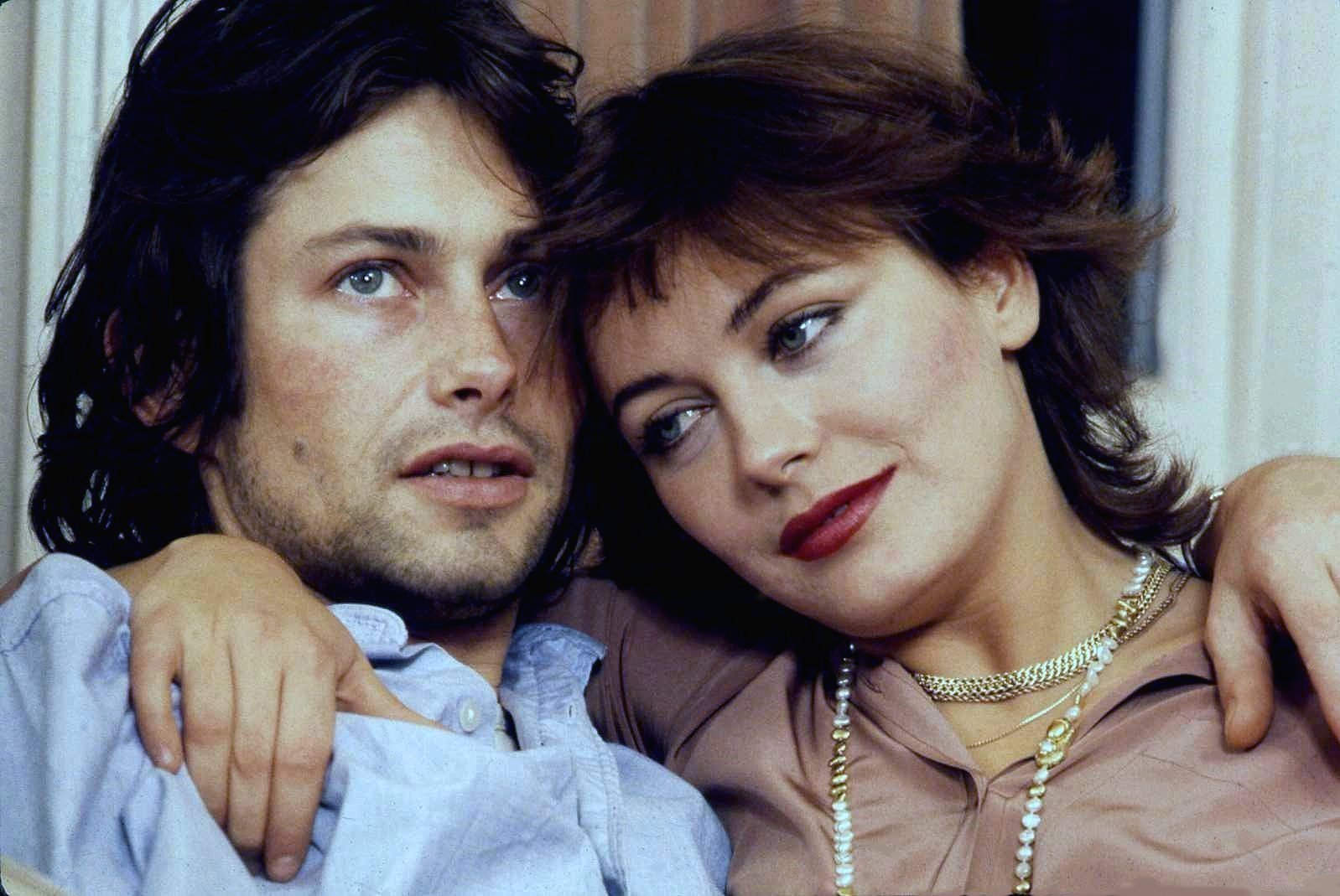
Lesley-Anne Down and Bruce Robinson (1979)

After ending a 10-year relationship with actor-writer Bruce Robinson, Down married Enrique Gabriel in 1980, but ended their marriage after a year and a half. Her second marriage was to film director William Friedkin from 1982 to 1985, with whom she had one son.

She met her third husband, cinematographer Don E. FauntLeRoy, during filming of the television miniseries North and South in 1985. Their relationship ended Down's marriage to Friedkin and Fauntleroy's marriage to Susan Ducat. The resulting legal and custody proceedings interrupted the careers of both Down and Fauntleroy for two years and ultimately cost Down and Friedkin US$1 million each. Down and Fauntleroy have a son.

Down has spoken on several occasions about dealing with sexual predators in the film industry. In 2002, she spoke of finding fame in the late 1960s: "The casting couch was in full swing, people expected it... My teenage years were pretty intense, a lot of pressure and a lot of horrible old men out there". In a 1977 interview, she had also said: "I was promised lots of lovely big film parts by American producers if I went to bed with them. Believe me, the casting couch is no myth".

== Filmography ==
=== Film ===
Year	Title	Role	Notes
1969	The Smashing Bird I Used to Know	Diana	
1970	Sin Un Adios	Marta Greidy	
1971	All the Right Noises	Laura	
1971	Assault	Tessa Hurst	
1971	Countess Dracula	Ilona Nodosheen	
1972	Pope Joan	Cecilia	
1973	Scalawag	Lucy-Ann	
1974	From Beyond the Grave	Rosemary Seaton	segment "The Door"
1975	Brannigan	Luana	
1976	The Pink Panther Strikes Again	Olga Bariosova	
1977	A Little Night Music	Anne Egerman	
1978	The Betsy	Lady Bobby Ayres	
1978	The First Great Train Robbery	Miriam	
1979	Hanover Street	Margaret Sellinger	
1980	Rough Cut	Gillian Bromley	
1981	Sphinx	Erica Baron	
1986	Nomads	Dr. Eileen Flax	
1987	Scenes from the Goldmine	Herself	
1993	Night Trap	Christine Turner	
1993	Over the Line	Elaine Patterson	
1994	Munchie Strikes Back	Linda McClelland	
1994	Death Wish V: The Face of Death	Olivia Regent	
1994	In the Heat of Passion II: Unfaithful	Jean Bradshaw	
1996	The Secret Agent Club	Eve	
1997	Meet Wally Sparks	Hooker Nurse	cameo
2000	The King's Guard	Queen Beatrice	
2001	The Meeksville Ghost	Emily Meeks	
2002	13th Child	District Attorney Murphy	
2005	Today You Die	Bank Manager	
2006	Seven Days of Grace	Lillian	Actress and writer
2006	Mercenary for Justice	Newscaster	Uncredited
2011	Cinnamon	Aunt Dora	
2011	Rosewood Lane	Dr. Cloey Talbot	
2014	Dark House	Lilian Di Santo	
2015	Kill Me, Deadly	Grand Dame Lady Clairmont	
2015	Absolution	Svetlana	
2015	Of God and Kings	Madame Renard	
2017	Justice	Elizabeth	
2018	Alex & the List	Victoria	
2019	Gates of Darkness	Sister Clare	Actress and writer
2024	Reagan	Margaret Thatcher	

=== Television ===
Year	Title	Role	Notes
1971	Six Dates with Barker	Cheeky	Episode: "2774 AD: All the World's a Stooge"
1971	Out of the Unknown	Diana Carver	Episode: "To Lay a Ghost"
1971	Public Eye	Anne Biddersloe	Episode: "Shades of White"
1973–1975	Upstairs, Downstairs	Georgina Worsley	22 episodes
1974	Bedtime Stories	Monica	Episode: "The Snow Queen"
1975	The Sweeney	Caroline Selhurst	Episode: "Chalk and Cheese"
1976	When the Boat Comes In	Jane Cromer	Episode: "King for a Day"
1976	Call My Bluff	Herself	
1977	Play of the Month	Ellie Dunn	Episode: "Heartbreak House"
1977	Supernatural	Felizitas	Episode: "Mr. Nightingale"
1978	The One and Only Phyllis Dixey	Phyllis Dixey	Television film
1981	BBC2 Playhouse	Unity Mitford	Episode: "Unity"
1982	Murder Is Easy	Bridget Conway	Television film
1982	The Hunchback of Notre Dame	Esmeralda	Television film
1984	The Last Days of Pompeii	Chloe	Mini-series
1985	Arch of Triumph	Joan Madou	Television film
1985	North and South	Madeline Fabray LaMotte	Mini-series
1986	North and South, Book II	Madeline LaMotte Main	
1988	Indiscreet	Anne Kingston	Television film
1988	Ladykillers	Morganna Ross	Television film
1989	Night Walk	Geneva Miller	Television film
1989	CBS Summer Playhouse	Cassandra	Episode: "Shivers"
1990	Dallas	Stephanie Rogers	13 episodes
1992	1775	Annabelle Proctor	TV pilot
1994	The Nanny	Chloe Simpson	Episode: "Maggie the Model"
1994	Heaven & Hell: North & South, Book III	Madeline Main	TV mini-series
1995	A Family of Cops	Anna Novacek	Television film
1996	Beastmaster III: The Eye of Braxus	Morgana	Television film
1996	Diagnosis: Murder	Catherine Windsor	Episode: "A Model Murder"
1997–1999	Sunset Beach	Olivia Richards	Main cast
1998	Young Hearts Unlimited	Barbara Young	Television film
2001	Days of Our Lives	Lady Sheraton	5 episodes
2001	The Perfect Wife	Helen Coburn	Television film
2001	You Belong to Me	Dr. Susan Chancellor	Television film
2003–2012	The Bold and the Beautiful	Jackie Marone	Main cast
2016	I Am Watching You	Margaret	Television film
2016	A Cinderella Christmas	Victoria Carmichael	Television film

== Awards and nominations ==
Year	Result	Award	Category	Film or series
1978	Won	Evening Standard British Film Awards	Most Promising Newcomer – Actress	
1986	Nominated	Golden Globe Awards	Best Supporting Actress – Series, Miniseries or Television Film	North and South
1997	Won	Soap Opera Update Awards	Best Actress	Sunset Beach
2005	Won	Rose D'Or Light Entertainment Festival	Best Soap Female	The Bold and the Beautiful
2005	Nominated	Soap Opera Digest Awards	Favorite Return	The Bold and the Beautiful
2006	Won	TV Soap Golden Boomerang Award	Popular Supporting Female	The Bold and the Beautiful
2025	Nominated	Golden Raspberry Awards	Worst Supporting Actress	Reagan
