= Jackie Marone =

Jackie Knight
- The Bold and the Beautiful character
- Portrayed by: Lesley-Anne Down
- Duration: 2003–12
- First appearance: Episode 4014; April 1, 2003
- Last appearance: Episode 6271; February 29, 2012
- Created by: Bradley Bell
In-universe information
- Other names: Jackie M Jackie Payne; Jackie Knight
- Occupation: Businesswoman; Sex worker
- Family: Knight
- Husband: Frank Payne; Massimo Marone (2003–04); Owen Knight (2009–present)
- Sons: Nick Marone
- Stepsons: Logan Knight
- Grandsons: Jack Marone
- Granddaughters: Nicole Marone

Jackie Marone is a fictional character in the CBS soap opera The Bold and the Beautiful, portrayed by British actress Lesley-Anne Down. She first appeared on April 1, 2003, and departed in 2012 after Down's contract was not renewed.

== Casting ==
Lesley-Anne Down made her first appearance as Jackie on April 1, 2003. Following the departure of Joseph Mascolo, who portrayed Jackie's husband Massimo Marone, Down appeared less frequently as Jackie. In March 2008, it was reported that Down's contract on the soap had been renewed. In January 2012, it was reported that Down's contract had not been renewed, shortly after it had been announced that Brandon Beemer, who portrayed Jackie's husband Owen Knight, had also been taken off contract. Down and Beemer made their last appearances on February 29, 2012.

Down has said that she enjoyed playing Jackie, calling her "very interesting" and that she liked the character. She also said that she was "really thrilled" to join the soap, as she had been wishing to be in another soap since the end of soap opera Sunset Beach, where she had played Olivia Richards. Down also said that she was less like Jackie than Olivia. Down also liked the dresses that she wore as Jackie, saying that she found it "thrilling".

== Development ==
In 2020, Ashley Jones, who plays Bridget Forrester, said that she thought that Jackie's relationship with Owen had declined, explaining, "Owen is a single dad, helping raise his son. He and Jackie have probably run their course".

== Storylines ==
Jackie comes to town shortly after her son Nick moves to L.A. working for Fenmore's Department Stores and immediately sets her sights on Eric Forrester, putting Jackie at odds with Eric's wife, Stephanie. When her son becomes involved with Brooke Logan, who is engaged to Ridge Forrester, Jackie pushes Nick to pursue Brooke but this caused Jackie to meet her old lover and Ridge's father Massimo Marone. Jackie began to see Massimo and during a flight that crashed she admitted to Massimo that he was Nick's father and both realized that Frank Payne, her husband at the time, had deceived both of them into thinking that neither cared for the other and Massimo never knew about Nick. Only Jackie knew that Nick was Massimo's son. Jackie and Massimo soon got married and he planned a great future but Jackie continued to support Nick's pursuit of Brooke while Massimo was caught in the middle of the war over Brooke between Ridge and Nick. Brooke married Ridge and the two honeymooned in South America but Ridge and later Brooke and Nick were kidnapped by Sheila Carter. Massimo led a rescue mission but during a fight with Sheila's thugs Ridge was rescuing Brooke but he fell into a burning furnace and was thought to have died. Brooke was overcome with grief and Nick followed her and seduced her but Ridge survived and he returned to L.A. Brooke discovered she was pregnant. Unsure of who the father was, Brooke told Ridge about her night with Nick and took a paternity test that said Nick was the father. Jackie was overjoyed and even before Brooke left Ridge was planning his life with Brooke and the baby but the doctor soon told Jackie that there was a mistake with the test. Jackie kept this hidden from everyone but secretly ran a second test that revealed that Ridge was the father but Jackie still refused to tell anyone who the true father of the baby was for fear of Nick's relationship with Brooke ending. Eventually the truth came out as did Jackie's prior knowledge of the baby's paternity, which greatly strained her relationship with Nick and nearly destroyed her marriage to Massimo who had supported Nick's relationship with Brooke thinking Nick was the father. This caused Ridge to turn his back on Massimo and started a war between Ridge and Nick with Massimo caught in the middle and losing his eldest son Ridge. Around the same time Jackie began an affair with Deacon Sharpe and used him to conduct the second paternity test. The affair was soon discovered by Massimo who had a massive stroke as a result.

Massimo takes revenge on Deacon and drives him into alcoholism. Massimo divorced Jackie and gives her a huge settlement, including Jackie M Designs. However, when Jackie supports Nick's marriage to Brooke, Massimo uses his connections with the FBI to have Jackie arrested on false charges of tax evasion, money laundering and tax fraud. Nick later convinces Massimo to release her but also was able to convince the Marone board to replace Massimo as CEO with Nick. After Massimo leaves, Jackie became involved with Eric again but he leaves her to marry Stephanie as their daughter Felicia Forrester's dying wish, with the understanding that after Felicia died Eric would marry Jackie. However, Felicia survives and Eric chooses to stay with Stephanie. Stephanie and Jackie have many fights, one of which results in Jackie ending up in a coma when she falls from the stairs. This prompts an enraged Nick to try to get revenge on Stephanie. However, it is revealed Jackie lied about how her accident happened, that she had sex with several sea captains that worked for Marone Industries who came into Seattle for money when Nick was very young. Nick finds that untenable disowns Jackie for having been a prostitute. With the help of the psychiatrist Taylor Hayes, Nick has since forgiven Jackie and they once again had a strong relationship. In an attempt to "shame" Nick and Jackie into returning the Forrester's company to them, Stephanie announced to all that Jackie was a former prostitute during the debut fashion show of "The New Nick-owned Forrester Creations." The plan backfired and Jackie garnered sympathy for having had to stoop so low to make a life for her and her son, particularly from Eric. Furious with Stephanie for sinking so low as to reveal such personal and damaging information about Jackie to the world, Eric continued to harbor resentment toward Stephanie and sympathy for Jackie. Jacqueline has taken advantage of Eric's vulnerability toward her and continuously attempts to seduce him away from Stephanie.

Despite the growing animosity between Nick and the Forresters, Jackie and Eric remain friends and she later becomes best friends with Stephanie, who becomes a partner with Jackie at Jackie M Designs and helps make the company very successful. After Stephanie left Jackie M Designs, she and Jackie remained closed. After an unsuccessful attempt at restarting the Brooke's Bedroom, Nick decided to sell Forrester Creations back to Eric, with one ultimatum—Stephanie may not be a part of the company. The sale was successful, and excluded the sale of Jackie M Boutiques, by which Jackie still owned. Jackie one of the prime suspects in the shooting of Stephanie. When she returns to Jackie M Designs, she quickly leaves town without any explanation. It is later revealed that Storm was the one who shot Stephanie.

Jackie's company was in danger of going bankrupt so she merged Jackie M Boutiques and M Fashions into one company called Jackie M Designs. She and Nick received all the designs from Forrester Creations newest line via e-mail by a person shrouded in mystery. The mysterious contact asked in return to be made President of the company. That someone was Rick Forrester. The situation appalled Forrester Creations; but Eric, in a show of fair play, allowed Jackie M. Designs to keep the line, since it was already out on the streets, in exchange for Rick not becoming president. Later on, though, his sister, Bridget, taking a leave of absence from the hospital, e-mailed her designs to Jackie, and she was so impressed that she hired her, however incognito as Madame X. Later on, it was apparent that Bridget was working there, because Jackie clearly thinks that she and Nick should be together again, and thus has begun a rivalry with Nick's fiancée, Katie Logan. Jackie and Nick hire Stephanie at Jackie M. Designs, after is fired from Forrester Creations by Eric. Due to Stephanie's contacts within the fashion industry, Jackie M. Designs is poised to get itself back to fiscal health This has also allowed Stephanie to bond closer with Jackie, and the two put aside their combative pasts and to become friends as well as develop a good professional relationship as well. Having recently hired Owen Knight, Jackie has started to date her chief of staff. Nick is appalled at the relationship, believing that Owen is simply after Jackie's money. In June 2009, after Jackie fired Owen, for Nick, Owen proposed and Jackie accepted. Nick is furious and vowed never to let his mother marry Owen. When Nick went on his honeymoon with Bridget in Hawaii, Owen bought two plane tickets to Hawaii himself, unaware that Nick and Bridget were also there.

The two couples had many near misses but Owen and Bridget eventually saw each other on the beach. They teamed up to make sure Nick and Jackie didn't know the other was in Hawaii. Owen planned a wedding for Jackie unbeknownst to Bridget. When Bridget realized that Owen was planning on marrying Jackie, she told Nick, who rushed out in order to prevent the wedding from going through. However, Nick arrived too late, and was left to see the happy couple driving off. On a television talk show, however, Nick, Bridget, Whip and Jackie heard that Owen had declared that she was nothing but his "cougar fantasy woman" and then snidely told her on TV, that she'd been Punk'd. This sent Jackie to the bottle and into Whip's apartment. It was quickly revealed that the "Owen" on television was actually Owen's immature twin brother Casper Knight, who was determined to play a prank on Owen. Jackie immediately forgave Owen, and he eventually forgives her for kissing Whip. The two remain very much in love, despite the occasional rough spots. Owen cheats on Jackie by having a one-night stand with Bridget, which results in the birth of their son, Logan Knight. In October 2010, Rick Forrester, Bridget's older brother, makes his interest in Jackie known to her and begins pursuing her especially after Nick fired Jackie, Owen and Bridget from Jackie M Designs. Even though Jackie is interested, she makes it clear to Rick that she is married to Owen. Rick had no intention of giving up on her no matter what but realizes that it just wasn't worth it in the end. Jackie asked Owen to meet up with Bridget in Hawaii, where she enables Owen to realize his love for his son Logan and Bridget. Jackie sorrowfully asked Owen for a divorce, and Owen went to Bridget. In October 2011, Jackie moves closer again to Eric. They share more kisses but Eric chooses Stephanie, angering Jackie. In 2011, Nick receives an anonymous message from a woman which says to meet him in the sauna of Jackie M When he discovers that it is Stephanie's sister, Pamela Douglas, he is shocked. Pam informs him of her break-up with Stephen and confesses to finding him (Nick) increasingly attractive. Nick rejects her advances, but Jackie makes a deal with Pam: in exchange for her getting to spend time with Nick, Pam agrees to steal some of the sketches from Eric.

In February 2012, Bridget and Owen announce their decision to split in order to allow Owen to return to his marriage with Jackie. Owen and Jackie reunite and declare their love for each other. Jackie then moves to New York with Bridget and Logan to be with Owen's family.

== Reception ==
In 2008, Luke Kerr from Daytime Confidential believed that the news of Down's contract being renewed was "great news", and hoped that the soap would Down and Jackie "to good use and give her a juicy storyline". Kerr commented on how Jackie's airtime had been "greatly reduced" from previous years, writing, "Gone are the triangles with Eric and whatever other woman is fighting for his attention, be it Donna or Stephanie. What happened to her taking over Spectra and turning it into "M"?" In 2022, Charlie Mason from Soaps She Knows placed Jackie 21st on his ranked list of The Bold and the Beautiful’s Best of the Best Characters Ever, commenting "Her fondness for boy toys nothwithstanding, we always saw Nick's mother, checkered past and all, as the heiress apparent to Stephanie's throne." In 2024, Mason placed Jackie and Massimo 32nd on his ranked list of The Bold and the Beautiful's 40 Greatest Couples of All Time, commenting, "Power couple? Table for two? Right this way. It took Nick's mother and father decades to figure out how well they fit together, but once they finally did... Oh, who are we kidding? It was a disaster (but at least an engrossing one!)" Mason also placed Jackie's pairing with Oliver 20th on the list and wrote "More than a mere May/December affair, these two served as a hot, hot reminder that age is nothing but a number — and left behind photographic evidence to prove it. Apple, anyone?" Chris Eades from Soap Opera Digest called Jackie a "British beauty". Daytime Confidential later put Owen and Jackie's relationship on their list of the best soap opera couples in 2009, commenting that whilst ""Cougar" storylines were all the rage in 2009", Jackie and Owen's relationship "felt organic and highly erotic", adding, "Gorgeous, much younger, stud Owen Knight helped revitalize sophisticated, fashion maven Jackie Marone, even as their relationship stirred up conflict with Jackie's son, Nick (Jack Wagner). From catwalks to Hawaiian beaches and many a photo shoot in between, Jowen flaunted their relationship—and Beemer's delicious abs— proving that some cougars are definitely better than others!"
