= The Secret Agent Club =

1996 film by John Murlowski

- DVD cover
- Directed by: John Murlowski
- Written by: Rory Johnston
- Produced by: James Ian Lifton; Brian Shuster
- Starring: Hulk Hogan; Matthew McCurley; Lesley-Anne Down; Richard Moll
- Cinematography: Andrzej Bartkowiak
- Edited by: Leslie Rosenthal
- Music by: Jan Hammer
- Distributed by: Cabin Fever Entertainment
- Release date: August 16, 1996
- Running time: 90 minutes
- Country: United States
- Language: English

The Secret Agent Club is a 1996 American spy action comedy film starring Hulk Hogan and directed by John Murlowski. The film is about a secret spy (Hulk Hogan) who steals a laser gun and pretends that it is a toy but gets in deep trouble when the people find out who he stole the gun from.

== Plot ==
When Ray Chase, an agent so secret even his son doesn't know, brings home a high-powered laser gun he stole, the theft victim sends her henchmen to capture Ray and get the gun back. But Ray's son escapes with the gun and then devises a plan to rescue his dad.

== Cast ==
- Hulk Hogan as Ray Chase
- Matthew McCurley as Jeremy Chase
- Lesley-Anne Down as Eve
- Maurkice Woods as Sly
- Danny McCue as Bart
- Ashley Power as Rosalie
- Jimmy Pham as Shigeo
- Richard Moll as Wrecks
- Lyman Ward as SHADOW General
- Barry Bostwick as Vincent Scarletti
- Edward Albert as Max Simpson
- James Hong as Mr. Yamata (Shigeo's grandfather)
- Jack Nance as Doc
- M.C. Gainey as Jock Dad
- Brian Yandrisovitz as Umpire
- Vachik Mangassarian as Sheik
- Rory Johnston as Computer Hacker
- Christopher Doyle as Driver Cop
- Mark Ginther as Yo-Yo Guard
- Alex Koba as Soviet General
- 'Wild' Bill Mock as Spanky
- John Ammirati as Buckwheat
- Allison Bibicoff as Woman in Bleachers

== Production ==
Hogan himself saw the film as a "low-budget kids' film".

== Release ==
The film was released direct-to-video on August 16, 1996. Platinum Disc released a DVD version on February 8, 2005.

== Reception ==
The film is listed by WhatCulture as part of the "tidal wave of garbage" in Hogan's acting career.

A contemporary review calls the film "a dim-witted riff on True Lies". The Lexikon des internationalen Films states: "A James Bond adventure for children was probably the starting point for this film, but incompetent actors, a miserable script, inferior tricks and great lack of craftsmanship make this idea worthless. Only the cynicism of the filmmakers is visible."
