= Peaceful Warrior =

- Theatrical release poster
- Directed by: Victor Salva
- Screenplay by: Kevin Bernhardt
- Based on: Way of the Peaceful Warrior by Dan Millman
- Produced by: Robin Schorr; Mark Amin; David Welch; Cami Winikoff
- Starring: Nick Nolte; Scott Mechlowicz; Amy Smart; Ashton Holmes; Agnes Bruckner
- Cinematography: Sharone Meir
- Edited by: Ed Marx
- Music by: Bennett Salvay
- Production company: DEJ Productions
- Distributed by: Lionsgate
- Release dates: June 2, 2006 (US: Limited); March 30, 2007 (US: Re-release)
- Running time: 121 minutes
- Countries: Germany; United States
- Language: English
- Budget: $10 million
- Box office: $4.3 million

Peaceful Warrior is a 2006 sports drama film directed by Victor Salva and written by Kevin Bernhardt based on the 1980 novel Way of the Peaceful Warrior by Dan Millman. Set at U.C. Berkeley, the film stars Nick Nolte and Scott Mechlowicz alongside Amy Smart, Ashton Holmes and Agnes Bruckner, and follows Dan Millman (Mechlowicz), a talented gymnast who is mentored by gas station attendant Socrates (Nolte).

== Plot ==
Dan Millman is a university student as well as a locally famous gymnast who dreams of winning a National Championship competition. He suffers from restlessness, and on one occasion, Dan attempts to compensate for it by running along streets before sunrise. At a car-service station, he encounters an old man who seems to know more about Dan's problem than Dan himself knows, whom Dan later nicknames "Socrates". Dan is unsettled by Socrates' knowledge; by the fact that Socrates had appeared in a nightmare as a faceless janitor, clad in mismatched shoes (by which he is identified in waking life), who sweeps up the pieces of Dan's shattered leg; and by the old man's extraordinary speed, agility, and coordination. As a result of his exposure to the last, Dan seeks to learn the secret behind it.

Socrates, prodded by the impatient and defiant Dan, gives the boy a series of tasks and lessons. The central concept of "Soc's" philosophy is this: that one must live entirely in the present moment. Other ideas include the related notion that at no time is "nothing going on" and the idea that an appropriate time exists for fighting and another for abstaining from violence. These lessons are conveyed through practical lessons, long contemplation, and one spectacular mystical experience. Dan gradually learns to appreciate every moment; to view the journey toward a goal as more meaningful and significant than the attainment; to pay attention to that which he is doing – thus increasing his gymnastic prowess; and (to a slightly lesser extent) control himself. Throughout the lesson, Dan learns virtually nothing about his mentor, other than the philosophy, Socrates' belief that service is the most noble action possible (hence his choice to work as a car serviceman), and the presence of another protégé.

This protégé, a woman of Dan's own age named Joy, has learned and integrated Socrates' philosophy into her life, to the extent that she seems as wise as Socrates himself. Dan attempts to ask her for information regarding Socrates, but receives little. Joy treats Dan indulgently, though she evidently respects him.

One day, Dan drives recklessly, and his motorcycle collides with a car that ran a red light, causing his right femur bone to shatter. He is rushed to a hospital, where a metal bar is placed in his leg to maintain its integrity. As a result, his gymnastic coach believes that Dan cannot compete in the National competition. Dan, hurt by this lack of faith, recovers from the injury and resumes his training under Socrates' tutelage. Eventually, he is restored to full health and strength, while his coordination improves and his mind is set entirely on the present moment. He competes in the U.S. Trials for the Olympics and achieves a victory.

Slightly before the competition, Dan diverts the bus he is riding to Socrates' station, only to find that Socrates has vanished without a trace. At the arena, he attempts to teach his teammate Tommy what he has learned, but fails due to Tommy's emotional insecurity and lack of comprehension. Dan then is called upon for his turn to perform on the still rings. While he does his routine, Dan performs flawlessly just like his previous tryouts. Moments before he completes his routine, Socrates is in his thoughts asking him three questions: "Where are you, Dan?" "Here." "What time is it?" "Now." "What are You?" "This Moment." Dan then performs triple consecutive flips, with the commentators frantically speaking and the judges staring at him in amazement. He then dismounts, and the rings swing outwards, eventually touching each other. The screen goes black, leaving his last moment unknown.

The postscript states that Dan and his Berkeley Gymnastics Team won their first National title. It is implied at the end, in a postscript appearing on screen, that Dan of the film and Dan the author of the book on which the film is based are one and the same. It is also stated that the latter Dan lives with his wife Joy.

== Cast ==
- Scott Mechlowicz as Dan Millman
- Nick Nolte as Socrates "Soc"
- Amy Smart as Joy
- Tim DeKay as Coach Garrick
- Ashton Holmes as Tommy
- Paul Wesley as Trevor
- B. J. Britt as Kyle
- Agnes Bruckner as Susie
- Scott Caudill as Thug One (as Scott 'Jesic' Caudill)

== Production ==
According to Nolte, “I’ve known this book since the late seventies. I had gone through the sixties with the peace movement, resistance of the war, civil rights. Millman had written this book about spiritual discovery in a novel. It was very open and readable and it appealed to a lot of people. At that time that it was offered to me, way, way back like 19 years ago I didn’t feel as close or the importance of the message in this piece as I do now.”

== Reception ==
On the review aggregator website Rotten Tomatoes, 26% of 70 critics' reviews are positive. The website's consensus reads: "Based on a best-selling memoir, Peaceful Warrior loses something in the transition from page to screen. It hits the viewer over the head with philosophical jargon, and ultimately fails to live up to its source material." Metacritic, which uses a weighted average, assigned the film a score of 40 out of 100, based on 23 critics, indicating "mixed or average" reviews.

Roger Ebert of the Chicago Sun-Times gave the film two and a half out of four stars.
