= The Nature of the Beast (1995 film) =

Nature of the Beast
- Video release poster
- Directed by: Victor Salva
- Written by: Victor Salva
- Produced by: Daniel Grodnik; Robert Snukal; John Tarnoff
- Starring: Eric Roberts; Lance Henriksen
- Cinematography: Levie Isaacks
- Edited by: W. Peter Miller
- Music by: Bennett Salvay
- Production companies: Itasca Pictures; Norstar Entertainment
- Distributed by: New Line Cinema
- Release date: October 24, 1995
- Running time: 91 minutes
- Country: United States
- Language: English

Nature of the Beast (European title: Bad Company, UK title: Hatchet Man) is a 1995 American direct-to-video mystery horror film written and directed by Victor Salva and starring Eric Roberts and Lance Henriksen.

== Plot ==
The story is set in Southern California in July 1993. Jack Powell is a businessman with a wife and kids who live in San Diego. He's on his way home, when he pulls over to the side of the road to check out a crime scene. The sheriff tells him a cut-up body has been found stuffed into the trunk of a Chrysler, and advises him not to stop, nor "make any new friends." A policeman slams the trunk, revealing a name has been etched across the top: "Hatchet Man".

Farther down the road, Jack comes upon a hitchhiker, but keeps on going. Jack stops at a diner, and runs into the same man, who introduces himself as Adrian. Jack apologizes for not stopping earlier, and offers to buy Adrian lunch. Adrian soon nicknames their waitress, Patsy, "Jingle Bells", because of the silver bracelets she wears on one wrist. Patsy talks excitedly about a briefcase full of $1.25 million in mob money which was stolen from a Las Vegas casino the previous day. Jack looks around nervously and slides his briefcase underneath the table. Adrian tells Jack he's very intuitive about people he meets, and can usually tell all he needs to know about someone within a couple of minutes of meeting them. For example, is the person a loser, or was he a football star, or, perhaps class president. Jack doesn't seem convinced before Adrian asks him what he's got in his briefcase. When Adrian gets up to make a move on Patsy in the kitchen, Jack ditches him and makes his escape.

As Jack drives down the highway, he listens to a radio newscaster recount the story of the stolen briefcase and discusses a string of murders in which all the victims have been dismembered. Jack is forced to turn back because a roadblock has been set up to cordon off a chemical spill. Jack checks into a motel. In the middle of the night, Jack awakes, and walks outside his room to investigate another crime scene, this one located behind the diner where he and Adrian had lunch that day. He sees a severed arm with silver bracelets placed into a bag and Adrian hiding in the shadows. Adrian joins Jack in his motel room and shoots up in the bathroom. When it seems Adrian is unconscious, Jack tries to leave again, but his car won't start. Adrian stumbles out and reveals he's removed the plugs from Jack's car, and tells Jack not to leave again, or "I'll call the police".

The next morning, Jack and Adrian take to the road together. At a gas station, they meet a young hippie couple named Gerald and Dahlia, who are traveling cross-country in a Dodge van. Adrian wants to hang out with the hippies, but Jack insists they keep going. They stop at a service station so Jack can have a busted water hose on his car replaced. As Jack deals with the attendant, Adrian browses a pet store called the Creepy Crawly Zoo. The owner, Harliss, shows Adrian a Gila monster, which uses its viselike bite to inject a neurotoxin into the bloodstream. Back in the car, with Jack behind the wheel, Adrian uses the Gila monster to reassert his power over Jack by throwing the monster onto Jack's lap while he drives. Jack struggles to maintain his composure, and appears frozen by fear and anxiety. To compound matters, Adrian then slams his foot onto the accelerator and the car almost loses control and eventually shudders to a grinding halt before Adrian lets the Gila monster go, and warns Jack on his previous disobedience, and tells Jack he is "one crazy motherfucker".

Jack and Adrian spend that night at a campsite, where they once again run into Gerald and Dahlia. Adrian gets high with them while Jack broods outside the van. Adrian accuses Jack of trying to scare them off. Later, Jack finds Adrian having sex with Dahlia in the back of the van while Gerald watches. Jack gets drunk and retires. Adrian shows up later and goads him. After Jack and Adrian drive away in the morning, a shot of the van shows blood smeared down the license plate and the name "Hatchet Man" etched across the back doors. The following night, Jack and Adrian stay at a secluded cabin Jack inherited. For the first time, we see the money that was stolen from the Vegas casino, as Jack and Adrian use it to play poker. Adrian prepares to shoot up again, as Jack lectures him about his drug "problem". Adrian slaps Jack around, and accuses him of being an alcoholic and a hypocrite. Adrian releases Jack from his grip and returns to his drugs whilst advising Jack to do the same with his drink. Jack reacts by beating Adrian from behind with his briefcase, taping him to a chair and injecting him with a deadly mixture of alcohol and drugs. Adrian convulses and appears to expire, and Jack buries him in a shallow grave.

Sheriff Gordon and his deputy, Little David show up to check on Jack, and over their shoulders Jack can see Adrian rising from the grave. The policemen are called away on a domestic disturbance and leave without noticing Adrian. Jack attempts to gun him down. After he's unloaded his shotgun, Adrian emerges from the shadows. When Adrian pleads with Jack as to why he cuts up the bodies into tiny little pieces, Jack removes a hatchet from his briefcase, and now in a far more confident baritone than he has displayed at any point in the film announces, "For the fuck of it", and as the screen fades to black the spectator is left only with the sounds of a violent struggle and can only conclude Jack has killed Adrian once and for all.

Jack returns home to San Diego and kisses his wife, Carol. The paperboy greets him and he replies cheerfully, "Say, hey, Billy." As the film fades to black, a quote from the Book of Jeremiah appears on the screen: "The heart is deceitful above all things and desperately wicked. Who can know it?" This echoes an earlier statement made by Adrian, who said that human beings are essentially unknowable.

== Cast ==
- Eric Roberts as Adrian "Dusty"
- Lance Henriksen as Jack Powell
- Brion James as Sheriff Gordon
- Frank Novak as Manfred
- Tom Tarantini as David "Little David"
- Sasha Jenson as Gerald
- Ana Gabriel as Dahlia
- Eliza Roberts as Patsy
- Ava Lazar as Blue
- Phil Fondacaro as Harliss
- Lin Shaye as Carol Powell
- Victor Salva as Radio Newscaster / Truck Driver In Diner (uncredited)
