= Seven Days of Grace =

- Directed by: Don E. FauntLeRoy
- Screenplay by: Lesley-Anne Down
- Produced by: Jake L. Cluck; Peter Evans
- Starring: Ria Coyne; Lesley-Anne Down; Stephanie Beacham; Olivia Hussey; Gavan O'Herlihy; Peter Evans; Stephen Furst
- Cinematography: Don E. FauntLeRoy
- Edited by: Chris Reiss; William Rohn; Mary Ann Skweres
- Music by: Michael Werckle
- Distributed by: Invincible Pictures
- Release date: April 1, 2006
- Country: United States
- Language: English

Seven Days of Grace is a 2006 American comedy-drama film directed by Don E. FauntLeRoy. The motion picture stars a number of notable British actresses including Golden Globe award winner Olivia Hussey, and Golden Globe nominees Stephanie Beacham and Lesley-Anne Down.

== Plot ==
Four women – a blond, a hippie, a lesbian and a bartender – attempt to save an Italian restaurant inherited by protagonist Grace Bastiglione as the landlord threatens closure of the eatery. Grace's culinary experimentation is consistently unsuccessful, and she searches for a lost family recipe that might salvage the business. The film follows the four women as they pursue love, money, and success, going to extremes to rescue the restaurant including gambling and selling lingerie.

== Cast ==
- Stephanie Beacham as Dana
- Ria Coyne as Grace Bastiglione
- Lesley-Anne Down as Lillian
- Peter Evans as Alex
- Olivia Hussey as Jewel
- Gavan O'Herlihy as MacNab
- Frank Campanella as Papa
- Stephen Furst as Henry Henary, III
- Jennifer Nairn-Smith as Choreographer
- Will Schaub as Bobby
- Diamond Pleshaw as Drunk Man in Bar
- Katie Campbell as Marilyn Pool Dancer
- Katie Peterson as Marilyn Pool Dancer

== Production ==
Filming began on March 17, 1996, 10 years before the eventual 2006 release of the film. Seven Days of Grace was shot on location in the California towns of Malibu and Montrose, with filming concluding in August 1996. The FauntLeRoy family was instrumental in the production of the film. Don E. FauntLeRoy served as the director, cinematographer and one of the producers, while his wife Lesley-Anne Down was both a featured actress and writer of the screenplay. Don's daughters, Juliana and Season, served respectively as second assistant camera operator and still photographer.

Actors Peter Evans and Ria Coyne, playing the parts of Alex and Grace, wrote the original screenplay together before it was adapted by Lesley-Anne Down. Evans also served as the executive producer to the film. Coyne, who had appeared in Batman Forever the previous year, additionally served as a producer.

Diamond Pleshaw appeared as an actor but additionally worked behind the scenes as assistant art director. The following year, he worked as a production assistant for the popular television series Seinfeld, the same year that actress Olivia Hussey appeared on the comedy series Boy Meets World.

== Release ==
The film was finally released to theaters on April 1, 2006, rated PG-13 for drug use and sexual content. It was released by Timeless Media Group on DVD on October 2, 2007.

Seven Days of Grace served as the final release for prolific actor Frank Campanella who died on December 30, 2006, at the age of 87, less than seven months after the release of the movie. Shooting for the film had initiated only five days after his 77th birthday, and the actor would amass over 100 film and television credits during his illustrious career. Nevertheless, Raising Helen is the final film in Campanella's lifetime as it was filmed long after but released before Seven Days of Grace.

Seven Days of Grace was also Hollywood's last theatrical release featuring veteran actor Stephen Furst (excluding made-for-television movies). Arguably best known for the role of heavyset frat boy "Flounder" in the comedy film National Lampoon's Animal House, Furst was in the midst of filming the science fiction series Babylon 5 when he was cast in Seven Days of Grace. He was diagnosed with diabetes in 1996 at the age of 41, the same year he appeared in Seven Days of Grace. Furst died from complications with diabetes on June 16, 2017, at the relatively young age of 63.

As of 2019, Seven Days of Grace was the last feature film for Jennifer Nairn-Smith, while it served as the debut of actress Katie Peterson. The movie was also the first experience for Mari Wilson as a script supervisor, later serving in that role for a number of TV series including Buffy the Vampire Slayer, CSI: Crime Scene Investigation, Crossing Jordan, The Ellen DeGeneres Show, and House.

== See also ==
- List of American films of 2006
