= Today You Die =

2005 American action film

- DVD cover
- Directed by: Don E. FauntLeRoy
- Written by: Kevin Moore
- Story by: Danny Lerner
- Produced by: Randall Emmett; George Furla; Danny Lerner; Steven Seagal
- Starring: Steven Seagal; Treach; Sarah Buxton; Mari Morrow; Nick Mancuso; Robert Miano
- Cinematography: Don E. FauntLeRoy
- Edited by: Robert Ferretti
- Music by: Steve Edwards
- Production companies: Millennium Films; Nu Image; Emmett/Furla Films
- Distributed by: Sony Pictures Home Entertainment
- Release date: September 13, 2005
- Running time: 90 minutes
- Country: United States
- Language: English

Today You Die is a 2005 American action film directed and shot by Don E. FauntLeRoy. The film stars Steven Seagal, who also produces with Randall Emmett, George Furla and Danny Lerner. It co-stars Treach, Sarah Buxton, Mari Morrow, Nick Mancuso, Robert Miano, and a minor appearance by Chloë Grace Moretz. The film was released on direct-to-DVD in the United States on September 13, 2005.

== Plot ==
Harlan Banks (Steven Seagal) is a thief who has always picked his own jobs and tried to pull heists that would leave him room to help others. The work keeps getting riskier, and at the urging of his girlfriend Jada (Mari Morrow), Banks has decided to pull one final job, going in with some men who are planning a $20 million robbery.

After the heist goes bad, Banks heads to Las Vegas, where Jada wants him to get a real job. On the way to town, Banks and Jada passed a children's hospital displaying a going out of business sign. Banks gets a job driving an armored car for a man, Max (Kevin Tighe). The job is not exactly legitimate, and Bruno (Robert Miano), Banks' partner for the job, shoots a security guard, resulting in a chase through the Las Vegas Strip in the armored van.

However, Banks is stopped and sent to prison, where he befriends an inmate known as "Ice Kool" (Treach). With Ice's help, Banks escapes, determined to hunt Max down. Along the way, Banks meets a federal agent named Saunders (Nick Mancuso), and it turns out that Saunders, who is in league with Max, is the man behind the setup. Banks decides to set out and take down both Saunders and Max with a job.

== Cast ==
- Steven Seagal as Harlan Banks
- Treach as "Ice Kool"
- Sarah Buxton as FBI Agent Rachel Knowles
- Mari Morrow as Jada
- Nick Mancuso as FBI Agent Saunders
- Robert Miano as Bruno
- Kevin Tighe as Max
- Jamie McShane as Vincent
- Lawrence Turner as Garret
- Brett Rice as Taggert
- Mitch Laue as The UNC-Wilmington Legend
- Lance J. Mancuso as Casino Guard
- Chloë Grace Moretz as Little Girl
- Elayn J. Taylor as Old Tarot Reader
- Hawthorne James as Derrick
- David Fryberger as Cop
- Morann Peri as Cop Partner
- John Gulino as Marshall
- Smalls as "Dinky-D"
- Darren Ting as Ming Lee
- John Wister as Rusty
- Lesley-Anne Down as Bank Manager
- J. Anthony Pena as Hispanic
- Lisa Guerrero as Reporter
- Brian Jay as The Bartender
- Jerry Trimble as Garret's Gang #1
- J. J. Perry as Thug
- Les Weldon as Helicopter Pilot
- Randy Couture as Vincent's Bodyguard #1

== Legal troubles ==
The producers of Today You Die filed lawsuits against Seagal because of experiences during the filming. Producers at Nu Image and Kill Master Productions alleged that Seagal, while filming this and Mercenary for Justice, arrived at the set late, left early, and re-wrote scripts without their permission, among other things. However, Seagal disputed the suit, and he countersued against producers, claiming fraud and breach of contract.

== Home media ==
The DVD of the film was released in Region 1 in the United States on September 13, 2005, and also Region 2 in the United Kingdom on 10 July 2006. It was distributed by Sony Pictures Home Entertainment.
