= Joey (1997 film) =

- Theatrical release poster
- Directed by: Ian Barry
- Written by: Stuart Beattie; Maxwell Grant
- Produced by: Michael Lake
- Starring: Jamie Croft
- Cinematography: David Burr
- Edited by: Lee Smith
- Music by: Roger Mason
- Production companies: Village Roadshow Pictures; Pacific Film and Television Commission; Pratt Films
- Distributed by: Roadshow Entertainment (Australia); Metro-Goldwyn-Mayer (International)
- Release date: 26 December 1997
- Running time: 97 minutes
- Country: Australia
- Language: English

Joey is a 1997 Australian children's film. The film was released theatrically by Roadshow Entertainment on 26 December 1997 in Australia, later on VHS. The film was also released direct-to-video by Metro-Goldwyn-Mayer on 16 June 1998 in the United States and on 6 August 1999 in Japan.

== Plot ==
The movie starts with a boy, Billy McGregor, narrating how he enjoys living in the countryside. He introduces some kangaroos which he says are his best friends, who are Kim (mother), Wal (father), and their joey, Joey. He uses a remote control car with an attached camera and stuffed kangaroo. Soon after, the Dixon family drive their car to hunt the kangaroos. Billy notices them and whistles to the kangaroos so they run off before the Dixons spot them. Using the scopes on their guns, they search the area and spot Billy running to get his remote control car to bring it home. Mr. Dixon spots him. Angry, he and his sons give chase, driving towards the boy. Billy gets into a Ute owned by his aboriginal friend, Mick, and escapes. Mr. Dixon yells out to him, warning him to stay off his property.

He drives home just when his morning alarm goes off, which also feeds his fish through a contraption he made, and successfully sneaks into his room through the window. He meets his mother, Penny, out front of the house who is holding his bag, and she tells him that she'll be very angry is she finds out that he was on the Dixon's land again, not knowing he was just there. Billy makes a snide remark that it's better that she doesn't. Mick remarks how crazy Billy is as he grabs his push-bike and rides to school. He arrives late, yet again sneaking in through the window. The teacher is asleep and the class quietly watches as Billy walks to his desk. He starts to carefully pull out his chair, so not to as wake the teacher, when the youngest Dixon slams his hand on his desk, waking the teacher up. This leads to the teacher spotting Billy's late arrival and tells him to stay after school. During recess Dixon and another boy start a fight by using ants, surrounded by classmates cheering them on. Billy runs through the crowd, grabs the ants and returns them to the ground just outside of school, leading Dixon, angry, to tackle Billy to the ground and the two to begin to fight. A police officer sees the fight and breaks the two apart. Dixon tells the officer about Billy being on their property again this morning, and this time, they want to press charges. Frustrated, the officer takes him home and chats with his mother about this morning. During their discussion, the officer also reminds Billy's mother that their house will foreclose and they need to come up with $50,000 by October. Penny promises to get the money. The officer suggests that he and Penny become a couple, saying that Billy needs a father then leaves.

Later that night, a mysterious man arrives at the Dixon house with a livestock truck. The Dixons have hired him to get rid of the kangaroos. The man grabs a bunch of tranquillizers and tells them he's taking them to Kangaroo Kingdom, an illegal underground kangaroo boxing facility in Sydney. They shoot every kangaroo except for Joey, who narrowly escapes. Mick and Billy arrive near the scene shortly after it happens because they saw lightning striking near it. Mick notices that there were recently two trucks that drove by, leading to and from the kangaroo area, and he tells Billy that the kangaroos were ambushed and taken, showing a dart that was left on the ground. The two hear the whining of Joey, and Billy approaches Joey and grabs him before he can hop away. He tells Mick that he's got to take him home with him, but Mick warns Billy that his mother won't like it. However, Billy wins by saying that Joey needs help.

Billy pries open a container containing the Save the Animals fund to get money to buy a ticket. He goes to the train station and boards a midnight express to Sydney at 1:00 AM. Joey is discreetly stuffed into Billy's jacket because of a rule preventing the export of kangaroos on a train. After they arrive in Sydney, they sleep and are woken up by Sylvia Vanguard. Joey meets Linda, the daughter of Ted Ross, an ambassador from the United States. Billy finds her holding Joey and demands that Joey be given to him, but she refuses. Eventually, after telling her about how he will not survive without his parents, Kim and Wal, she gives in. Meanwhile, two reporters, John O'Bannon (John-o) and Davo, lament and argue about not being able to capture Ted Ross’ limousine driving. While they talk, they manage to unluckily miss news-worthy moments. Billy and Linda find a taxi and pay using Linda's father's credit card, then directs the taxi driver, Spiros, to drive to Kangaroo Kingdom’s address. However, they are unable to release the kangaroos and they run out due to boxers. At Harrisville, Penny reports Billy missing at the police station and, with Mick, takes a train to Sydney. Meanwhile, Sylvia, who turns out to be an animal activist who closed Kangaroo Kingdom 15 years ago, directs Billy and Linda to her mansion, where they help animals. However, they leave Sylvia and drive her ambulance to Kangaroo Kingdom.

On the street, John-o and Davo are approached by Billy and Linda, asking them to use their cameras and equipment to hijack a television network and spread the real story of Joey, and then they create the Help Billy Help Joey fund. The boxing match starts and Billy sends down his remote-controlled car to record and televise the event on national television, so that everyone sees it. Suddenly, they realize they can’t stop the event, so the kids come down and use a microphone to tell a story from the perspective of the caged kangaroos, then the police arrest them. The hijacked reports become famous and get their own night show and the Help Billy Help Joey fund raises $50,000 that Billy uses to pay off the mortgage of their house and the money he stole from the donation box. At the end, it shows life on the farm, with Linda visiting Billy, with the narrator commenting that Billy had made a friend for life.

== Cast ==
- Jamie Croft as Billy McGregor
- Alex McKenna as Linda Ross
- Rebecca Gibney as Penny McGregor
- Ed Begley Jr. as Ambassador Ted Ross
- Peter Kowitz as Senator
- George Kapiniaris as Spiros
- Richard Moir as School Teacher
- Tony Briggs as Mick
- Harold Hopkins as Kanga catcher
