= Altered Reality =

2024 film by Don FauntLeRoy

- Theatrical release poster
- Directed by: Don E. FauntLeRoy
- Written by: Charles Agron
- Produced by: Charles Agron; Armand Gazarian
- Starring: Tobin Bell; Charles Agron; Alyona Khmara; Krista Dane Hoffman; Edward Asner; Lance Henriksen
- Cinematography: Don E. FauntLeRoy
- Edited by: Scott Conrad; Andrew Cohen; John Blizek (add'l)
- Music by: Andrew Morgan Smith
- Production company: Blue Horse Productions
- Distributed by: K Street Pictures
- Release date: February 16, 2024
- Running time: 98 minutes
- Country: United States
- Language: English
- Box office: $30,800

Altered Reality is a 2024 mystery thriller film directed by Don E. FauntLeRoy and written by Charles Agron. It stars Tobin Bell, Agron, Alyona Khmara, Krista Dane Hoffman, Edward Asner and Lance Henriksen. The independent film was released in limited theaters on February 16, 2024.

== Premise ==
Oliver Cook is a wealthy businessman dealing with the loss of his only child in a mystery of whether she was murdered or kidnapped. Events of his past may be the key in discovering the truth.

== Cast ==
- Tobin Bell as Cooper Mason
- Charles Agron as Oliver Cook
- Alyona Khmara as Caroline Cook
- Lance Henriksen as Jack
- Krista Dane Hoffman as Alex Parker
- Edward Asner as Mike Wilson
- Kayla Adams as Brittany
- Paul Rodriguez as Gene Ramos

== Production ==
In March 2020, it was reported that Don E. FauntLeRoy had directed the then titled film, Awaken. Charles Agron wrote, produced and stars in the film. Tobin Bell, Alyona Khmara, Krista Dane Hoffman, Edward Asner, Lance Henriksen and Kayla Adams also star. Bell and Henriksen co-produced. The film is also one of the last feature films Asner completed before his death in 2021.

Principal photography took place on location in Augusta, Georgia from January to March 2020.

== Release ==
Altered Reality was released in limited US theaters by K Street Pictures on February 16, 2024. It would later release through VOD in the US and Canada by Vision Films on February 18, 2025.
