= Victor Salva =

American film director and convicted sex offender

- Born: Victor Ronald Salva; March 29, 1958 (age 68); Martinez, California, U.S.
- Occupations: Film director, screenwriter
- Years active: 1986–2017
- Awards: Moxie! Award for Best Feature – Santa Monica Film Festival; 1999 Rites of Passage

Victor Ronald Salva (born March 29, 1958) is an American filmmaker. He has primarily worked in the horror genre, most notably as the writer-director of the commercially successful Jeepers Creepers (2001) and its sequels Jeepers Creepers 2 (2003) and Jeepers Creepers 3 (2017). Outside of horror, Salva wrote and directed the fantasy-drama film Powder (1995).

Salva's filmmaking career has been controversial due to his 1988 conviction for sexually abusing a 12-year-old actor who starred in his feature film debut Clownhouse (1989), along with possessing child sexual abuse material. This controversy has led to protests against his films, including a boycott of Powder organized by his victim.

== Early life ==
Victor Ronald Salva was born in Martinez, California, on March 29, 1958. He was raised Catholic. His biological father abandoned the family, and he has said that his stepfather was a physically abusive alcoholic. Salva was interested in horror and science fiction from a young age; his favorite monster movie was Creature from the Black Lagoon, and the local newspaper reported in 1975 that the 17-year-old Salva had gone to the cinema to see Jaws 55 times. His family disowned him when he came out as gay at age 18. He was a childcare worker before becoming a filmmaker, which drew scrutiny during his sexual abuse conviction.

== Career ==
By the time Salva graduated from high school, he had written and directed over 20 films, both short and feature-length. To finance his filmmaking hobby, he often held two jobs during the week. His short horror film Something in the Basement (1986), an allegory about a young boy awaiting his brother's return from a bloody war, took first place in the fiction category at that year's Sony/AFI Home Video Competition. The film went on to win several national awards (including a Bronze Plaque at the Chicago International Film Festival) and brought Salva to the attention of Francis Ford Coppola, who then agreed to produce Clownhouse (1989), the first theatrical feature film Salva wrote and directed. Coppola reportedly saw so much potential in Salva that he gave him the same cameras he had given George Lucas for the production of American Graffiti (1973). Salva would go on to describe himself as Coppola's protégé.

Following his 1988 conviction for sexually abusing Nathan Forrest Winters, the 12-year-old star of Clownhouse, Salva took a hiatus after his release from prison in 1992; he worked as a telemarketer during the week and wrote scripts during the weekend, supposedly delivering them to well-known producers while posing as a delivery boy. His next film came when he wrote and directed the direct-to-video mystery horror film The Nature of the Beast (1995). He reportedly based the film's characters on people he met in prison. He then wrote and directed his first major studio film, the fantasy drama film Powder (1995), about an albino boy with special powers that make him an outcast. At the time of the film's release, Salva's conviction became known to the public when Winters came forward and called for the film's boycott. Disney stated that they had been informed of Salva's crime only after production of Powder had begun. Salva said, "This has followed me around ever since it happened, but once people meet me the phantoms go away and they realize I made a stupid mistake, years ago. [...] My past is going to follow me around for as long as people want to talk about it."

Salva next wrote and directed the coming-of-age thriller film Rites of Passage (1999), which depicts a homophobic father who unwittingly pushes his gay son into the arms of a psychotic killer. He then wrote and directed Jeepers Creepers (2001), which Coppola executive produced; it became a breakout hit and set a record for the largest Labor Day box office ever. He followed it up with Jeepers Creepers 2 (2003), again executive produced by Coppola. His next film was Peaceful Warrior (2006), an adaptation of the semi-autobiographical book Way of the Peaceful Warrior by Dan Millman. The film depicts the emotional and physical trials of a young gymnast and his awakening under the tutelage of a mysterious spiritual guide. He then returned to the horror genre for his films Rosewood Lane (2011) and Dark House (2014).

Salva wrote, directed, and produced Jeepers Creepers 3 (2017), which drew controversy for incorporating a character who was the victim of child sexual abuse. Dialogue that suggested justification for the abuse was later cut from the film.

Salva has described his films as "atmospheric and macabre, with no happy endings, but not to be taken totally seriously".

== Child sexual abuse ==
Salva was convicted of sexual assault in 1988 for sexually abusing Nathan Forrest Winters, the 12-year-old star of Clownhouse, and videotaping one of the encounters in which he forced Winters to perform oral sex on him. Commercial videotapes and magazines containing child sexual abuse material were also found in his home. He pleaded guilty to lewd and lascivious conduct, oral sex with a person under 14, and procuring a child for pornography. He was sentenced to three years in state prison, of which he served 15 months, and lifetime registration as a sex offender. He completed his parole in 1992. His mentor, Francis Ford Coppola, reportedly told him that his experience in prison "would have value" and "make [him] a better artist". Winters later picketed Salva's film premieres and released a documentary detailing the abuse by Salva, which began when Winters was seven years old following a year of grooming.

== Filmography ==
Year	Title	Director	Writer	Producer	Notes
1986	Something in the Basement	Yes	Yes	Yes	Short film
1989	Clownhouse	Yes	Yes	Yes	
1995	The Nature of the Beast	Yes	Yes	No	
1995	Powder	Yes	Yes	No	
1999	Rites of Passage	Yes	Yes	No	
2001	Jeepers Creepers	Yes	Yes	No	
2003	Jeepers Creepers 2	Yes	Yes	No	
2006	Peaceful Warrior	Yes	No	No	
2011	Rosewood Lane	Yes	Yes	Yes	
2014	Dark House	Yes	Yes	Yes	
2017	Jeepers Creepers 3	Yes	Yes	Yes	
