= Philip Purser =

British television critic (1925–2022)

Philip John Purser (28 August 1925 – 1 August 2022) was a British television critic and novelist.

== Life and career ==
Purser was born in Letchworth, Hertfordshire on 28 August 1925. His mother had been the first female student of an art school in Sheffield, and later worked as a postcard artist in the style of Mabel Lucie Attwell. After service in World War I, his father eventually worked for Tarmac in Liverpool from 1934 when the family settled in the Wirral Peninsula. Purser had an older sister, Rozanne.

A contributor to the News Chronicle in the 1950s, he was television critic of The Sunday Telegraph from its launch in 1961 until he was sacked in 1987 by Peregrine Worsthorne, the then editor. Purser co-authored two editions of Halliwell's Television Companion (1982, 1986, originally Halliwell's Teleguide 1979) and wrote a TV film The One and Only Phyllis Dixey (Peek-A-Boo) on the wartime erotic entertainer for Thames Television in 1978. A biography of Dixey (co-authored with Jenny Wilkes) was published in the same year.

In 1975 he was the first person to publicly reveal (in his 'Mandrake' column) that the famous 'Surgeon's photograph' of the Loch Ness Monster was a hoax, but this was not widely known until 1994.

Purser contributed obituaries to The Guardian. He was married to the crime writer Ann Purser; the couple had two daughters and one son. Purser died from Alzheimer's disease on 1 August 2022, aged 96.

== Bibliography ==
Fiction

- Peregrination 22. Jonathan Cape Books 1962
- Four Days to the Fireworks. Hodder & Stoughton 1964
  - other edition: Sphere Books 3/1970, ISBN 978-0-7221-7057-1
- The Twentymen. Hodder & Stoughton 1/1967, ISBN 978-0-340-02356-3 OCLC 832610674
- Night of Glass. Hodder & Stoughton 12/1968, ISBN 978-0-340-04422-3
- Holy Fathers Navy. Hodder & Stoughton 6/1971, ISBN 978-0-340-12535-9
- Lights in the Sky. Severn House Publishers 11/2004, ISBN 978-0-7278-6196-2

Non Fiction

- Friedrich Harris: Shooting the Hero. Quartet Books 5/1990, ISBN 0-7043-2759-7
- Poeted: Final Quest of Edward James. Quartet Books 2/1991, ISBN 978-0-7043-0139-9
- Done Viewing, Quartet Books 1992, ISBN 0-7043-7013-1
