= Way of the Peaceful Warrior =

Book by Dan Millman

- First edition
- Author: Dan Millman
- Language: English
- Genre: Personal-success
- Publisher: J. P. Tarcher
- Publication date: 1980
- Pages: 240
- ISBN: 978-1-932073-20-1

Way of the Peaceful Warrior is a part-fictional, part-autobiographical book based on the early life of the author Dan Millman. The book has been a bestseller in many countries since its first publication in 1980. The book initially had only modest sales before Hal Kramer came out of retirement to republish the book from the H. J. Kramer imprint of New World Library.

In early 2006, a film based on the novel, Peaceful Warrior, was released.

== Summary ==
The story tells of a chance meeting with a service station attendant who becomes a spiritual teacher to the young gymnast, Dan Millman. The attendant, whom Millman names Socrates, becomes a father figure and teaches Millman how to become a "peaceful warrior."

== Plot ==
Dan is a world-class trampoline gymnast attending college at the University of California, Berkeley. The story begins when Dan experiences a series of nightmares, where he is in a dark lane. In front of him is Death, about to claim his life, when an old man appears out of nowhere and confronts Death. One particular night, Dan heads out to an all-night gas station, where he meets the same old man from his dreams.

Dan, nervous, leaves immediately, but as he turns back, he sees the man standing on the roof. Surprised that he could move so quickly, Dan strikes up a conversation with the old man and calls him Socrates. Dan begins to meet Socrates on a regular basis and is interested in his philosophy.

Socrates ridicules Dan, pointing out that he is trapped in the illusions created by his mind, causing Dan so much trouble. Dan keeps a diary and is surprised that his mind is so troubled, but he is used to it. Dan demands that Socrates teach him. Socrates begins his initiation by showing Dan visions of his whole life; his purpose; the world, and "rearranges" the young man's mind. Socrates tells Dan that he should eliminate attachments and live in the present, but warns him that it would be a painful journey. Dan becomes besotted with Socrates's other protégée, a mysterious girl named Joy, who keeps turning up, unpredictably.

A few weeks later, Dan suffers an accident, where his right leg is badly fractured. Socrates arrives and accelerates Dan's healing process. Socrates takes Dan to a café, owned by his former disciple, Joseph, who serves simple food. Socrates instructs Dan to take up celibacy, consume only light food and avoid intoxicating substances.

Dan is frustrated and even fails once, but resumes. Next, Socrates begins to train Dan physically, making him run, correcting his poise and breath, practice tai chi, meditation and aikido and refining his gymnastics.

Dan graduates, and Socrates decides to part ways with him, as Dan must travel his path on his own. Dan marries Linda, but the marriage fails. He travels around the world for six years, learning new physical teachings, but is unable to find peace. Dejected, Dan returns to Berkeley, to an old place which Socrates had told him about long ago.

Dan meets Socrates again, now over one hundred years old. Socrates tells Dan that he is almost near his goal. Mystified, Dan follows Socrates to an ancient Native American burial ground. A thunderstorm breaks out, and the two go inside a cave. Dan experiences a vision where he dies but remains conscious. He finally overcomes his fear of death. Socrates reminds Dan of his teachings and that he must be happy without any reason. Socrates and Dan return home. Dan wonders where Socrates is and opens the door. Socrates has disappeared, presumably died. Dan returns home as a wiser man. He falls in love and marries Joyce, who is revealed to be Joy.

== Series ==
Way of the Peaceful Warrior was followed by three sequels:

- Sacred Journey of the Peaceful Warrior
- The Journeys of Socrates
- The Hidden School

== Editions ==
- Way of the Peaceful Warrior: A Book That Changes Lives, H J Kramer, 20th Anniversary Edition, ISBN 0-915811-89-8
- Peaceful Warrior: The Graphic Novel, H J Kramer, ISBN 1-932073-48-5
