= Don E. FauntLeRoy =

American film director

- Born: Don Edward FauntLeRoy; May 5, 1953 (age 73); Los Angeles, California, U.S.
- Occupations: Cinematographer, film director
- Spouse(s): Susan Ducat (1976–1985) Lesley-Anne Down (m. 1986)
- Children: 5

Don Edward FauntLeRoy (born May 5, 1953) is an American cinematographer and film director. He has over 70 credits as cinematographer, and more than 50 as a camera operator and second unit assistant. He has collaborated with director Victor Salva on such films as Jeepers Creepers, Jeepers Creepers 2, Rosewood Lane, and Dark House. He directed the Steven Seagal films Today You Die, Mercenary for Justice, and Urban Justice. He also directed Bering Sea Beast in 2014.

FauntLeRoy received American Society of Cinematographers Award nomination for Outstanding Achievement in Cinematography in Miniseries for his work in Heaven & Hell: North & South, Book III (1994).

== Directing credits ==
- Young Hearts Unlimited (1998)
- The Perfect Wife (2001)
- Today You Die (2005)
- Seven Days of Grace (2006)
- Mercenary for Justice (2006)
- Lightspeed (2006)
- Urban Justice (2007)
- Anaconda 3: Offspring (2008)
- Anacondas: Trail of Blood (2009)
- Bering Sea Beast (2013)
- SnakeHead Swamp (2014)
- Stolen (2018)
- Gates of Darkness (2019)
- A Ring for Christmas (2020)
- Altered Reality (2024)
