= Clownhouse =

1989 film by Victor Salva

- Original trade advertisement
- Directed by: Victor Salva
- Written by: Victor Salva
- Produced by: Michael Danty; Robin Mortarotti; Victor Salva
- Starring: Nathan Forrest Winters; Brian McHugh; Sam Rockwell; Michael Jerome West
- Cinematography: Robin Mortarotti
- Edited by: Roy Anthony Cox; Sabrina Plisco-Morris
- Music by: Michael Becker; Thomas Richardson
- Production company: Commercial Pictures
- Distributed by: Vision International; Triumph Releasing Corporation
- Release dates: January 1989 (Sundance Film Festival); July 20, 1990 (United States)
- Running time: 81 minutes
- Country: United States
- Language: English
- Budget: $200,000 (estimated)

Clownhouse is a 1989 American slasher film written and directed by Victor Salva in his feature-length directorial debut. It stars Nathan Forrest Winters, Brian McHugh, and Sam Rockwell in his film debut, as three young brothers stalked by escaped mental patients disguised as clowns, portrayed by Michael Jerome West, Bryan Weible, and David C. Reinecker. Clownhouse marks the second collaboration for Salva with Winters and McHugh, who previously appeared in his short film Something in the Basement (1986), and Rockwell's first film appearance.

The film premiered at the 1989 Sundance Film Festival, where it was nominated for the Grand Jury Prize in the dramatic category. The rights to Clownhouse were picked up by Vision International and Triumph Releasing Corporation, who released the film to theaters on July 20, 1990. Home media releases would be distributed by Metro-Goldwyn-Mayer in the early 2000s.

Clownhouse became the subject of controversy when Salva was convicted during post-production for sexually abusing the 12-year-old Winters between shoots. Due to the controversy, home media releases of the film were removed from distribution and are out of print.

== Plot ==
Casey is an adolescent boy whose life is constantly influenced by his intense fear of clowns. His two older brothers, Geoffrey and Randy, are mostly disobliging. One night, the three boys are left alone so they decide to visit a local circus, despite Casey's uncontrollable coulrophobia. While at the circus, Casey innocently visits a fortune teller and she reveals to him that his life line has been cut short. Meanwhile, three psychotic mental patients, who have escaped an insane asylum, murder three clowns and steal their identities of Cheezo, Bippo, and Dippo by taking their makeup and costumes.

As the boys return home from the circus, the mental patients target their home. Casey and his brothers are locked inside their isolated farmhouse and the power is turned off. Casey attempts to call the police, but the police officer assumes that Casey's fear of clowns caused him to have a realistic nightmare.

Randy, disbelieving that clowns are after them, plans to jump out at Geoffrey and Casey dressed as a clown but he is stabbed by one of the mental patients. Geoffrey manages to kill Bippo by hitting him with a wooden plank, knocking him down a flight of stairs and breaking his neck.

Casey and Geoffrey push Dippo out a window to his death. The boys find Randy unconscious in a closet and drag him into another room. Geoffrey is then attacked by Cheezo, who chases Casey into the upstairs game room. Casey manages to hide but after the clown leaves, Casey accidentally steps on a noise-making toy, alerting Cheezo of his location. Cheezo attempts to strangle Casey, but Geoffrey slams a hatchet into his back, finally killing him and saving Casey's life.

== Cast ==
- Nathan Forrest Winters as Casey
- Brian McHugh as Geoffrey
- Sam Rockwell as Randy
- Michael Jerome West as Lunatic Cheezo
- Bryan Weible as Lunatic Bippo
- David C. Reinecker as Lunatic Dippo
- Timothy Enos as Real Cheezo
- Frank Diamanti as Real Bippo
- Karl Heinz Teuber as Real Dippo
- Viletta Skillman as Mother
- Gloria Belsky as Fortune teller
- Tom Mottram as Ringmaster

== Production ==
Impressed by Victor Salva's 1986 short film Something in the Basement, Francis Ford Coppola gave him $250,000 to make Clownhouse. To shoot the film, Coppola gave Salva the same cameras George Lucas had used to make American Graffiti (1973). The film was made, in part, at Coppola's home in Napa Valley. Salva cast Nathan Forrest Winters and Brian McHugh in the film, who had previously worked with him in Something in the Basement.

== Release ==
The film was shown at the Sundance Film Festival in January 1989, and released theatrically on July 20, 1990. (Note: Advertisements in The Burlington Free Press from Friday, July 20, 1990 list the film as a new release, while a July 25, 1990 review in The Des Moines Register notes the film was the "only new movie in town" from the previous weekend.)

=== Controversy ===
In 1988, director Victor Salva was convicted of the sexual abuse of Nathan Forrest Winters, the 12-year-old lead actor who played Casey, during production, including videotaping one of the sexual assaults. Commercial videotapes and magazines containing child pornography were also found at his home. After serving 15 months of a three-year prison term, Salva was released on parole.

Winters came forward again in 1995, when Salva's film Powder was released. Winters picketed a screening in Westwood.

In a YouTube interview conducted by Blastzone Mike with Winters on April 5, 2017, Winters revealed that when Salva was arrested, everything but the dubbing had been completed, and that all of the dialogue was added in post-production due to the extremely loud noise of the cameras.

In a YouTube interview with The Millennial Report, in 2018, Winters spoke about the work he had to do after the principal photography. He had spent eight to nine hours a day doing the dubbing for a month. This took place at Francis Ford Coppola's home. During this time, he was told he would never work in the industry again, and he never did. Coppola later tried to sue Winters for breach of contract.

=== Critical response ===
Arlene Calkins of the Daily Utah Chronicle wrote that "This movie, for me, rivals anything I've seen done by Stephen King at his best... Salva's direction is crisp and right on the mark." TV Guide gave the film two out of four stars, writing that the film "plays cleverly on the visceral dislike many people feel for clowns and the result is often truly creepy." Joan Bunke of The Des Moines Register noted that the film "looks like a family-and-friends project... Salva... has cobbled together the usual outrageously phony horror flick plot," adding: "The fright-making shadows of Mortarotti's photography and the moody music underscoring the kids' horror of what is overtaking them helps blank out the irrationality of the plot."

The film was included in a 2017 list of the "creepiest clowns in movies" compiled by Variety, in which it was noted: "The film’s claustrophobic setting and eerie atmosphere makes it one of the scariest thrillers on this list."

On review aggregator website Rotten Tomatoes, the film holds a 33% approval score based on 6 reviews, with an average rating of 5.7/10.

== Home media ==
Mainly due to the controversy during its production, Clownhouse became a sleeper hit, but soon fell into obscurity. The film was released on VHS and Laserdisc in 1990. On August 26, 2003, the film was released on DVD by Metro-Goldwyn-Mayer. As of November 2026, Clownhouse has yet to receive a Blu-ray release.

== Works cited ==
- Goldstein, Patrick (June 11, 2006). "Victor Salva's horror stories". Los Angeles Times.
