= Powder (1995 film) =

1995 film by Victor Salva

- Theatrical release poster
- Directed by: Victor Salva
- Written by: Victor Salva
- Produced by: Roger Birnbaum; Daniel Grodnik
- Starring: Mary Steenburgen; Sean Patrick Flanery; Lance Henriksen; Jeff Goldblum
- Cinematography: Jerzy Zieliński
- Edited by: Dennis M. Hill
- Music by: Jerry Goldsmith
- Production companies: Hollywood Pictures; Caravan Pictures; Roger Birnbaum Productions; Daniel Grodnik Productions
- Distributed by: Buena Vista Pictures Distribution
- Release date: October 27, 1995
- Running time: 111 minutes
- Country: United States
- Language: English
- Budget: $9.5 million
- Box office: $30.9 million

Powder is a 1995 American science fiction drama film written and directed by Victor Salva. It stars Mary Steenburgen, Sean Patrick Flanery, Lance Henriksen, and Jeff Goldblum. Flanery plays the title character, a young albino man with an incredible intellect and supernatural powers.

The film was produced by Walt Disney Studios through its Hollywood Pictures label. Filming took place in Texas around suburbs of Houston, San Antonio, and Austin, Texas. The production was controversial due to Salva's prior conviction for child sex abuse, which prompted a boycott against the film led by his victim.

Powder was released October 27, 1995. It received mixed reviews, but was a commercial success, grossing $30.9 million on a $9.5 million budget.

== Plot ==
Jeremy "Powder" Reed is a young albino man who has incredible intellect and is able to sense the thoughts of the people around him. Jeremy's brain possesses a powerful electromagnetic charge, which causes electrical objects to function abnormally when he is around them, particularly when he becomes emotional. The electromagnetic charge also prevents hair from growing on his body.

Jeremy's mother was struck by lightning while pregnant with him; she died shortly after the strike, but Jeremy survived. His father disowned him shortly after his premature birth, and he was raised by his grandparents. Jeremy lived in the basement and worked on their farm, never leaving their property and learning everything he knew from books. He is taken from his home when his grandfather is found dead of natural causes. Jessie Caldwell, a child services psychologist, takes him to a boys' home because he is now effectively a ward of the state.

Jessie enrolls him in high school, where Jeremy meets physics teacher Donald Ripley. Donald finds out that Jeremy has supernatural powers as well as the highest IQ in history. While his abilities mark him as special, they also make him an outcast.

On a hunting trip with his schoolmates, Jeremy is threatened with a gun by John Box, an aggressive student who views him as a freak. Before John can fire, a gun goes off in the distance, and everyone rushes to see that Harley Duncan, a Sheriff's deputy, has shot a doe. Anguished by the animal's impending death, Jeremy touches both the deer and Harley at the same time, inducing in Harley what the students assume is a seizure. Harley later admits that Jeremy had actually caused him to feel the pain and fear of the dying deer. Because of the experience, Harley removes all of his guns from his house, although Sheriff Doug Barnum allows him to remain as a sheriff's deputy without a sidearm.

Doug enlists Jeremy to help speak to his dying wife through telepathy. Through Jeremy, the sheriff learns that his wife clings onto life because she did not want to die while not wearing her wedding ring and without him reconciling with his estranged son, Steven. She tells him that Steven found the ring and that it has been sitting in a silver box on her nightstand the entire time. Doug then places the ring on his wife's finger and reconciles with Steven, letting his wife die peacefully.

Jeremy meets Lindsey Kelloway, a romantic interest, but their relationship is broken by Lindsey's father. Before the interruption, he tells Lindsey that he can see the truth about people: that they are scared and feel disconnected from the rest of the world but in truth are all connected to everything that exists.

Jeremy goes back to the juvenile facility and packs away his belongings, planning to run away to his farm. He pauses in the gym to stare at a male student washing, noticing the latter's luxurious head of hair as well as body hair which he himself lacks, and is caught at it by John Box, who accuses him of homosexuality. John steals Jeremy's hat and taunts him, but Jeremy reveals that John's words mimic what his stepfather said before beating him when he was 12, infuriating him. John and the other boys humiliate Jeremy, stripping him naked and taunting him. His powers begin to manifest by pulling at their metal buttons and any piercings. Eventually, a large spherical electromagnetic pulse erupts throwing Jeremy into a mud puddle and everyone else to the ground. John is found still, with his heart stopped. Jeremy uses an electric shock to revive him.

Jeremy returns to the farm where he grew up, now in procession of probate with the bank, and finds that all of his possessions have been removed. He is joined by Jessie, Donald, and Doug, who urge him to come with them to find a place where he will not be feared and misunderstood. Instead, he runs into a field where a lightning bolt strikes him, and he disappears in a blinding flash of light. The electrical jolt hits Jessie, Donald, Doug, and Harley.

== Cast ==
- Mary Steenburgen as Jessie Caldwell
- Sean Patrick Flanery as Jeremy "Powder" Reed
- Lance Henriksen as Sheriff Doug Barnum
- Jeff Goldblum as Donald Ripley
- Brandon Smith as Deputy Harley Duncan
- Bradford Tatum as John Box
- Susan Tyrrell as Maxine
- Melissa Lahlitah Crider as Lindsey Kelloway (as Missy Crider)
- Ray Wise as Dr. Aaron Stripler
- Esteban Powell as Mitch
- Reed Frerichs as Skye
- Chad Cox as Zane
- Joe Marchman as Brennan
- Phil Hayes as Greg Reed (as Phillip Maurice Hayes)
- Danette McMahon as Emma Barnum
- Barry Berfield as Paramedic #1

== Soundtrack ==
The film's score was written by Jerry Goldsmith. Salva personally wanted Goldsmith to score the music of the film because he had been "an enormous fan" of the composer's work.

== Reception ==
Powder received generally mixed reviews from critics. On Rotten Tomatoes it has a rating of 50% based on 20 reviews, with an average rating of 5.2/10. The website's critics consensus reads, "Powder has some interesting and potentially affecting ideas, but they're ultimately dust in the wind of a drama that strains far too obviously for uplift."

Caryn James of The New York Times described the film as "lethally dull" with Goldblum's dry humor offering the only tolerable moments in the film. "This intensely self-important film has no idea how absurd and unconvincing it is."

Roger Ebert gave the film two stars out of a possible four. He criticized numerous plot holes and asserted that Flanery's makeup made him resemble a mime more than an albino. He wrote: "'Powder' has all of the elements of a successful fantasy, and none of the insights. It's a movie where intriguing ideas lie there on the screen, jumbled and unrealized. It leads up to bathos, not pathos, because not enough attention was paid to the underlying truth of the characters. They're all just pawns for the plot gimmicks."

Several critics noted similarities between the film and 2006 Bollywood film Alag upon the latter's theatrical release.

== Controversy ==
The film's production by Disney resulted in a controversy over the choice of writer-director Victor Salva, who had been convicted of molesting a 12-year-old child actor during the production of his directorial debut film, Clownhouse (1989). He was sentenced to three years' imprisonment and released after 15 months. Disney officials reported that they learned of Salva's crime only after production of Powder had begun, and stressed that there were no minors on the set for the film. When Powder was released, the victim, Nathan Forrest Winters, came forward again in an attempt to get others to boycott the film in protest of Disney's hiring Salva.
