= Dan Millman =

American author and lecturer

- Born: February 22, 1946 (age 80); Los Angeles, California, U.S.
- Occupations: Author, speaker
- Spouse: Joy Millman
- Children: Three daughters
- Parent(s): Herman and Vivian Millman
- Website: peacefulwarrior.com

Daniel Jay Millman (born February 22, 1946) (Note: The U.S. Gymnastics Hall of Fame gives his birth date as February 26, 1946.) is an American author and lecturer in the personal development field and NCAA Champion and US Hall of Fame gymnast. He is best known for the movie Peaceful Warrior, based on his own life and taken from one of his books.

== Early life and education ==
Millman was born in Los Angeles to Herman and Vivian Millman; he has an older sister Diane. Much of his early life included active pursuits like modern dance and martial arts and later trampoline, tumbling, and gymnastics. He attended John Marshall High School in Los Angeles, where he was named Senior Athlete of the Year.

During his senior year in high school, he won the United States Gymnastics Federation (USGF) national title on the trampoline. While a freshman at the University of California, Berkeley, he won the 1964 Trampoline World Championships in London, earning All-American honors, and won an NCAA Championship in vaulting. In 1966 he won the USGF championship in the floor exercise and vault.

He represented the United States in the 1965 Maccabiah Games, winning four gold medals in gymnastics.

In September 1966, just before his senior year at Berkeley, Millman's motorcycle collided with a car. He suffered a shattered right femur, requiring surgical repair and a bone marrow transplant with a steel nail inserted in his femur (which was removed a year later after the leg was healed). He actively pursued rehabilitation and was able to return to gymnastics as co-captain of his team, which won the 1968 NCAA Gymnastics Championships in Tucson, Arizona. He was the last male athlete to perform for the college on the high bar; he had his best-ever routine and perfect landing, which clinched the team title.

During his tenure at Stanford, he trained in aikido and earned a black belt; he has named Robert Nadeau as his aikido teacher.

== Career ==
In 1968, Millman served as director of gymnastics at Stanford University, where he coached U.S. Olympian Steve Hug and brought the Stanford team to national prominence. During Millman's tenure at Stanford, he trained in aikido, receiving a shodan certificate, and he has named Robert Nadeau as his aikido teacher; he studied tai chi and other martial arts.

In 1972, at the invitation of Jack Scott, a sports activist, Millman joined a program of athletic reform at Oberlin College in Oberlin, Ohio as an assistant professor of physical education. At Oberlin, on a travel research grant from the college, he went to San Francisco, where he completed the Arica 40-Day Intensive Training. Next he traveled to Hawaii, India, Hong Kong, and Japan; he studied various disciplines including yoga and martial arts in Japan.

In 1985, Millman began to produce audio and video programs. He also started presenting seminars and professional keynotes. His work is generally connected to the human potential movement.

Millman has authored 17 books as of 2015, which have been published in 29 languages. In 2006, his first book, Way of the Peaceful Warrior, was adapted for a film, Peaceful Warrior. The movie stars Nick Nolte, was distributed by Lionsgate Films and was re-released by Universal Pictures in 2007. He credits the inspiration for his first book to a gas station attendant he met who reminded him of Socrates and to whom he gave that name.

== Honors ==
Millman is an inductee of the USA Gymnastics Hall of Fame (1994) and the UC Berkeley Athletic Hall of Fame. He was named Senior Athlete of the Year and Gimbel Student-Athlete of the Year. In 1968 he was voted Senior Cal Athlete of the Year.

== Works ==
Works by Millman include the following:

- 1979: Whole Body Fitness
- 1980: Way of the Peaceful Warrior: A Book That Changes Lives
- 1985: The Warrior Athlete (revised edition of Whole Body Fitness)
- 1990: Sacred Journey of the Peaceful Warrior
- 1991: Secret of the Peaceful Warrior (for children, illustrated by Taylor Bruce)
- 1992: No Ordinary Moments: A Peaceful Warrior's Guide to Daily Life
- 1993: Quest for the Crystal Castle (for children, illustrated by Taylor Bruce)
- 1994: The Life You Were Born to Live: A Guide to Finding Your Life Purpose
- 1995: The Laws of Spirit: A Tale of Transformation
- 1998: Everyday Enlightenment: The Twelve Gateways to Personal Growth
- 1999: Body Mind Mastery (revised edition of The Warrior Athlete)
- 2000: Living on Purpose: Straight Answers to Life's Tough Questions
- 2006: The Journeys of Socrates: The Way Begins
- 2007: Wisdom of the Peaceful Warrior: A Companion to the Book that Changes Lives
- 2009: Bridge Between Worlds: Extraordinary Experiences that Changed Lives (with co-author Doug Childers)
- 2010: Peaceful Warrior: The Graphic Novel (illustrated by Andrew Winegarner)
- 2011: The Four Purposes of Life: Finding Meaning and Direction in a Changing World
- 2013: The Creative Compass: Writing Your Way from Inspiration to Publication (with co-author Sierra Prasada)
- 2017: The Hidden School: Return of the Peaceful Warrior
- 2022: Peaceful Heart, Warrior Spirit: The True Story of my Spiritual Quest
