= Iron Sky (disambiguation) =

Iron Sky is a 2012 Finnish science fiction comedy film.

Iron Sky may also refer to:

- "Iron Sky" (song), by Paolo Nutini, 2014
- "Iron Sky", a 1993 song by Mega City Four

== See also ==
- Iron Sky: Invasion, a video game based on the film Iron Sky
- Iron Sky: The Coming Race, the 2019 sequel to the film Iron Sky
