= Wreckamovie =

- Website type: Collaboration tool for movie making
- Available in: English
- Dissolved: 13 October 2014; 12 years ago
- Headquarters: Tampere, Finland
- Owner: Star Wreck Studios Oy Ltd (commercial)
- Creator: Timo Vuorensola
- Website: http://www.Wreckamovie.com/
- Commercial: No
- Registration: Required for input, reading free
- Launched: 1 February 2007; 19 years ago
- Current status: Defunct
- Content license: Free sharing, free agreement

Wreckamovie was a collaborative film production platform designed to enable individuals to initiate film projects and find a community to collaborate with, or to join existing film productions as collaborators within a worknet. Its aim was to make filmmaking more accessible, efficient, and feasible for everyone.

== History ==
Wreckamovie was developed by a group of Finnish filmmakers who, in 2005, created the freely downloadable Star Trek parody movie Star Wreck: In the Pirkinning. This film gained web fame for being created and distributed by a community of enthusiasts over the internet, notable for its special effects produced on a minimal budget using standard home computers. The experiences from creating this film led the group to develop a platform that was open and easy to use for everyone.

Less than ten years after its launch, the termination of the platform was announced on its Facebook page in October 2014, with no indications of revival or continuation of its services.

== Characteristics ==
Wreckamovie was considered a model example of the potential of Web 2.0 by Cisco Systems' Finland Oy. As a business model, it presented the opposite of the traditional way of making movies: a community creates and distributes the film, and only then, once popularity has been gained, does profitability come into play.

The Wreckamovie model was built on online collaboration to produce professional-quality audiovisual projects, ranging from short films and music videos to feature-length films. The model applied open source ideology and crowd sourced work and financing. Central to this was creating a community for each project to request assistance in production tasks. It was designed to foster interaction with the audience beginning with the development stage. The service did not distinguish between "professionals" and "amateurs," but emphasized enthusiasm and engagement.

The distribution model aimed to go beyond online distribution, targeting traditional movie screens to cell phones, leveraging the existing community supporting the project as a basis for viral marketing.

Wreckamovie was used for the Finnish horror film Sauna. It was also utilized for the production of the feature-length sci-fi parody Iron Sky, which reportedly raised 12% of its budget through the platform. There were more than 300 active projects listed on Wreckamovie in 2009.

== Awards ==
In 2008, the movie production community Wreck-A-Movie was elected the winner of the MindTrek Grand Prix 2008, receiving €20,008. In October 2009, Wreckamovie was chosen among the 36 finalists in the SIME conference's Rising Star of the North competition, finishing 23rd overall.

== See also ==
- Star Wreck: In the Pirkinning, the originating point for Wreckamovie
- Iron Sky, the first movie fully utilizing Wreckamovie
- Collaborative software
- Collective intelligence
- Crowdsourcing
- Viral marketing
- Web 2.0
- Worknet
