= Star Wreck (disambiguation) =

Star Wreck may refer to:

- "Star Wreck: The Absolutely Final Frontier", a 1990 episode of Alvin and the Chipmunks (1983)
- Star Wreck, a series of Finnish Star Trek parody movies by Samuli Torssonen
- Star Wreck (book series), a series of Star Trek parody novels by Leah Rewolinski
- Star Wreck (video game), a computer game that takes place in a parody of the Star Trek universe
- Star Wreck: In the Pirkinning, a 2005 film
- Star Wreck Role-playing game, a Finnish role-playing game based on the films
- Star Wreck, a short film parodying Star Trek that won an award on America's Funniest Home Videos in its 1989 first season, which depicted the entire crew played by the same man.
