= Stephanie Paul =

New Zealand actress and comedian

Stephanie Paul is a New Zealand actress and comedian. She starred as a Sarah Palin-esque United States president in the 2012 film Iron Sky.

== Early work ==
She has been performing on stage since the age of four, and started her professional career as a teenager. She was featured in local commercials, and has since worked her way up from small Tostitos commercials to featuring in hundreds of commercials - including four Super Bowl commercials. Stephanie's ads span seven international markets, and she also works in theatre, film, and television.

== Career ==
Paul is most well known in the 2012 Sci-Fi comedy Iron Sky and the Iron Sky: Invasion video game, released in December 2012, She plays the President of The United States in both. She reprised her role in the 2019 sequel Iron Sky: The Coming Race.

In 2012, Paul was on the list of nominees for best supporting actress at Australian Academy of Cinema and Television Arts (AACTA) for her role in Iron Sky, and is also known for her role as Pip Thomas in Tom Scott's Separation City. Additionally, she played the starring lead of Sarah Sloan in Douglas Underdhal's award-winning Film School Confidential. She has also been seen in various TV performances on shows such as The Bold and the Beautiful, Street Legal, and Amazing Extraordinary Friends.

In 1998, Paul went to the United States where she studied at the Neighborhood Playhouse in New York City. There Paul earned credits working in theatre and film. Then, in 2001, she moved to San Francisco to continue working in commercials, theatre, film, and TV, and studied on-camera and monologue techniques with Full Circle Productions.

Paul has trained with B.A.T.S, The Groundlings, IO (Improv Olympic), and the Improvatoriumin in Los Angeles, and was a member of Improv Troupe “Gumbo”, performing at the World Famous Comedy Store in West Hollywood. She also spent 2 years studying sketch writing at the Second City in Hollywood. She directed the entire production of a sketch comedy that she wrote and is currently in development for a show based on some of her characters as well as another sitcom project. Paul has 9 years professional Stand Up under her writing belt from working internationally in 7 countries. She is a co-founder of the Hilarious Healing Project.

== Filmography ==
- 2008: The Frequency of Claire – Maggie
- 2009: Separation City – Pip
- 2012: Iron Sky – President of the United States
- 2013: Rapture-Palooza – Kimberly
- 2019: Iron Sky: The Coming Race - President of the United States
