= African Film Press =

Media and journalism alliance

African Film Press (AFP) is a media and journalism alliance covering African and African-diaspora cinema, television, and screen-sector activity. It was formed in 2024 as a collaboration between three editorial platforms: Akoroko (United States), Sinema Focus (Kenya), and What Kept Me Up (Nigeria).

AFP operates as a networked organization, coordinating editorial coverage, industry reporting, and collective initiatives across multiple regions in Africa and the diaspora.

== History ==
African Film Press was established in 2024 by film industry journalists Tambay A. Obenson, Jennifer Ochieng, and Ikeade Oriade, as a formal alliance linking three independently operating media platforms focused on African screen cultures and industries.

In 2024, African Film Press was selected for the inaugural Moving Pictures Incubator, a programme led by Berlin-based production company Some Fine Day Pix and supported by the German Agency for International Cooperation (GIZ). At the conclusion of the programme, AFP was awarded one of three €20,000 grants during a final presentation event held in Nairobi in December 2024.

In 2025, African Film Press was selected for the EFM Startups programme at the European Film Market (EFM), held alongside the Berlin International Film Festival.

== Structure and member platforms ==
African Film Press functions as an alliance of three editorial platforms:

- **Akoroko**, founded in 2022, is a subscription-based publication covering African cinema, film policy, festivals, financing, and distribution.
- **Sinema Focus**, based in Kenya, reports on film, television, and theatre activity in East Africa.
- **What Kept Me Up**, based in Nigeria, covers Nigerian and African popular culture, film, and television.

Each platform maintains its own editorial identity and publishing operations, while participating in shared AFP initiatives and reporting projects.

== Activities ==
African Film Press coordinates collaborative editorial projects and industry initiatives involving its member platforms.

In 2025, African Film Press launched the AFP Critics Prize, an award for films by African filmmakers screened at four partner African film festivals on the African continent. The prize currently includes a US$500 cash award. The inaugural AFP Critics Prize was awarded on 5 December 2025 at the 5th edition of the S16 Film Festival in Lagos, Nigeria, to the short film Obi Is a Boy, directed by Dika Ofoma.

AFP also participates in international film markets, festivals, and professional programmes connected to African cinema and media development.
