= Älymystö =

- Origin: Helsinki/Tampere, Finland
- Genres: Avant-garde
- Years active: 2002−present
- Labels: Independent
- Members: Ilmari Haapanen; Timo Vuorensola; Risto Paalanen; Janos Honkonen; Marko Eskola; Laura Savisalo
- Website: www.alymysto.com/

Älymystö is a Finnish noise/ambient/industrial band which was formed in 2002 by the composer Ilmari Haapanen and the vocalist/lyricist Timo Vuorensola. After the preliminary recordings the lineup was joined by Janos Honkonen (theremin) and Risto Paalanen (guitar). With this core lineup Älymystö has published two studio albums and one EP. Currently the lineup includes also Laura Savisalo (cello) and the Farmakon bassist/vocalist Marko Eskola, who are also performing in the latest release, a split vinyl album that will be released by the end of the year 2009.

Musically Älymystö mixes pure noise into industrial rhythms and ambient soundscapes. The band has toured in Finland, Russia and the Baltic countries. In Finland the band members arranged a recurring club called Vainohulluus, which was dedicated for industrial, noise and experimental music. In addition to promoting Finnish avant-garde and experimental artists, it brought several notable industrial acts to the country, including Scorn and In Slaughter Natives.

In the autumn of 2008 Älymystö was nominated as the best noise in Helsinki by City newspaper.

== Band Members ==
- Mr. Haapanen - composer
- Mr. Vuorensola - vocals, lyrics
- Mr. Paalanen - guitar
- Mr. Honkonen - theremin, lyrics
- Mr. Eskola - bass guitar
- Ms. Savisalo - cello

== Discography ==
- Demonstration Fall 2003 (2003)
- Ontto Seurakunta EP (2004)
- Atomgrad (2005)
- 19:38:00 (Älymystö vs. And Then You Die) (2009)
- Unsealed (2002-2013) compilation (2013)

== Copyright Activism ==
Älymystö is notable for their strong stance against the traditional copyright systems and the current practices of copyright advocacy groups, which they have voiced out both as a band and as individuals.

All Älymystö material is published under Creative Commons Attribution-Noncommercial-No Derivative Works 3.0 Unported licence, which grants everybody the right for non-commercial distribution of their music. Additionally they have published an official band sanctioned BitTorrent of their album Atomgrad. The band has not sought a recording contract with any single record label, but they have published their material in co-operation with Neuroscan, Onyxia and Skithund Records.

Timo Vuorensola is known as the director of Star Wreck, an independent sci-fi comedy that is both sold as DVDs and distributed freely over the net. The movie has gathered a sizable fanbase all around the world in addition to being a commercial success. The creators of Star Wreck credit free distribution as the reason for the movie's success.

In 2005 Janos Honkonen managed to provoke a large scale e-mail campaign that was targeting the Finnish Parliament. The issue in stake was a new problematic copyright law (nicknamed Lex Karpela after the culture minister Tanja Karpela) that was about to be ratified. The campaign was noted widely in the mainstream media and the law, that was ready to be ratified, was returned to the Grand Committee for a second reading. In the end no changes were made to its contents.
