= Tero Kaukomaa =

Finnish filmmaker

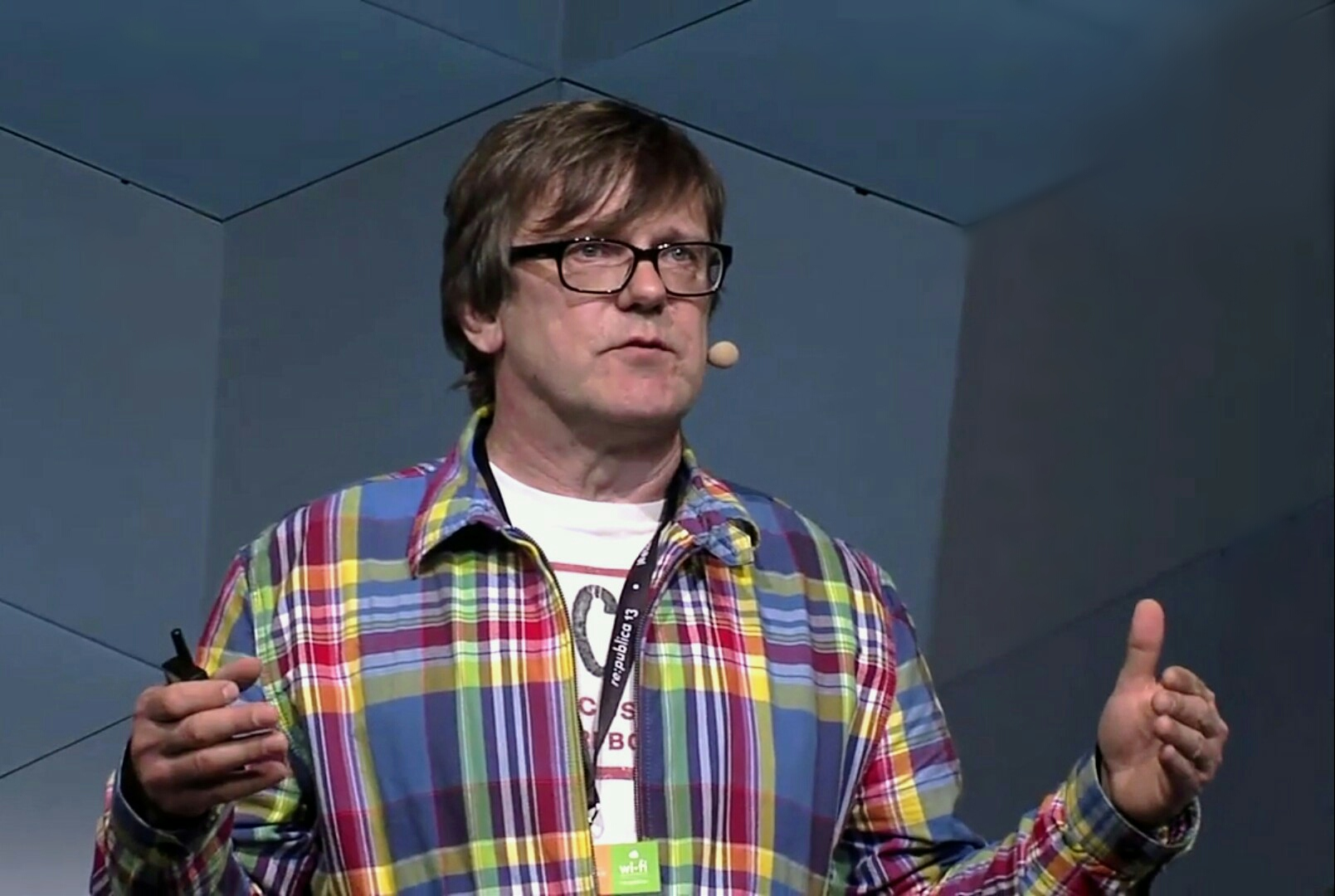
- Born: Finland
- Occupation: Film producer
- Years active: 1994–present
- Notable work: Miehen työ (A Man's Work); Sauna; 8-Pallo (8-ball); Iron Sky
- Awards: Jussi Award win; Jussis Award nominations; Nordic Council Film Prize nominations

Tero Kaukomaa is a Finnish film producer and the winner of the 'Producer of the Year Award' in 2012 from Suomen Elokuvatuottajien Keskusliitto (The Central Organization of Finnish Film Producers) for Iron Sky.

== Background ==
In 1997, Kaukomaa founded Blind Spot Pictures Oy as a production house to produce or co-produce feature-films for international markets. Blind Spot Pictures produced the film Iron Sky for Timo Vuorensola as a dark science fiction comedy about Nazis on the moon. They also had several features in development, including pre-production on Antti-Jussi Annila's werewolf inversion titled Human, and Iron Sky sequel Iron Sky: The Coming Race, financed through crowdfunding on Indie GoGo, on a script by American screenwriter Dalan Musson which had been released to over 1,000 fans for review and input. In 2012, Iron Sky director Vuorensola joined as partner with the Kaukomaa's company. As of 17 September 2019, Blind Spot Pictures Oy declared bankruptcy.

Kaukomaa is also Chairman of the Board of Iron Sky Universe Oy, the production company of Iron Sky: The Coming Race together with Timo Vuorensola, who is deputy member of the board. On 5 November 2019, Kaukomaa stated on the Iron Sky: The Coming Race crowdfunding campaign site that the company was facing financial difficulties and that fan Steelbook production was put on hold.

== Iron Sky Universe and Blind Spot Pictures bankruptcy ==
Blind Spot Pictures, the main production company for Iron Sky 2012 has been declared bankrupt since 17 September 2019.

Iron Sky Universe have been filed for bankruptcy as reported by Finnish news on 13 October 2020. This was also confirmed by Iron Sky Universe the same day. Kaukomaa's partner, Timo Vuorensola also confirmed that Iron Sky Universe had been filed for bankruptcy, "The production company of Iron Sky, called Iron Sky Universe, one which I jointly set up with Tero, is going under."

== Career ==
=== Filmography ===
Producer

- Aapo (1994)
- Recreation Area (1994)
- Jäykkä, kapea ja pelokas (1997)
- The Collector (1997)
- Good Deeds (1997)
- Shot (1997)
- Redeemer (1998)
- One Hundred Generations (1999)
- Rakastin epätoivoista naista (1999)
- Dancer in the Dark (2000)
- Slow at Heart (2000)
- The Geography of Fear (2000)
- Cyclomania (2001)
- Stripping (2002)
- The Third Wave (2003)
- Eila (2003)
- Producing Adults (2004)
- Opportunist (2005)
- Family of One (2005)
- Jade Warrior (2006)
- Miehen työ (2007)
- Falling Angels (2008)
- Everlasting Moments (2008)
- Sauna (2008)
- Jungle of Dreams (2008)
- The Rainbowmaker (2008)
- The Temptation of St. Tony (2009)
- A Rational Solution (2009)
- Amphibious Creature of the Deep (2010)
- Beyond (2010)
- Onnelliset läskit (2010)
- Tokio Baby (2010)
- 8-Pallo (2013)
- Iron Sky: The Coming Race (2019)
- Mad Heidi (TBA)

Announced

- Human
- I Killed Adolf Hitler
- Viking - Rise of the Warrior

== Recognition ==
In 2012, Suomen Elokuvatuottajien Keskusliitto (The Central Organization of Finnish Film Producers), awarded Tero Kaukomaa with their 'Producer of the Year Award', "its highest honor" and praised him for his "extremely bold and innovative approach to financing and producing Iron Sky".

=== Awards and nominations ===
- 2007, nominated for Nordic Council Film Prize for Miehen työ
- 2007, nominated for 'Producer of the Year Award' for Jade Warrior from The Central Organization of Finnish Film Producers.
- 2008, nominated for Jussi Award for 'Best Film' for Miehen työ
- 2009, nominated for Nordic Council Film Prize for Sauna
- 2012, won 'Producers Association Award' for Iron Sky from Helsinki International Film Festival
- 2012, won 'Producer of the Year' for Iron Sky from The Central Organization of Finnish Film Producers
- 2014, nominated for Jussi Award for 'Best Film' for 8-Pallo
