= Rapture-Palooza =

- Theatrical release poster
- Directed by: Paul Middleditch
- Written by: Chris Matheson
- Produced by: Ed Solomon
- Starring: Craig Robinson; Anna Kendrick; Ken Jeong; John Francis Daley; Rob Corddry
- Cinematography: Robert C. New
- Edited by: Melissa Bretherton
- Music by: Joachim Horsley
- Production companies: Mosaic Media Group; Mimran Schur Pictures
- Distributed by: Lionsgate
- Release date: June 7, 2013
- Running time: 85 minutes
- Country: United States
- Language: English

Rapture-Palooza (also known as Ecstasy) is a 2013 American supernatural comedy film written by Chris Matheson and directed by Paul Middleditch. The film stars Anna Kendrick and John Francis Daley as a young couple who battle their way through a religious apocalypse on a mission to defeat "The Beast" (Craig Robinson). The film also stars Ken Jeong, Rob Corddry, Thomas Lennon, Tyler Labine, Paul Scheer, Calum Worthy, John Michael Higgins, and Ana Gasteyer.

== Plot ==
Lindsey Lewis and her boyfriend Ben House are left on Earth after the rapture. The souls of the worthy have been taken to Heaven while everyone else has been left behind. The people left on Earth must fend for themselves in a world now plagued by evil locusts that constantly yell "suffer!", talking crows that use profanity, brimstone, wraiths, and storms that rain blood. The Antichrist, revealed to be a politician named Earl Gundy, takes control of the government and begins calling himself The Beast.

Lindsey's mother, a fervent Christian, was raptured but becomes the only person sent back after starting a fight in heaven. Her father is killed by one of the falling meteorites, and her brother Clark begins selling pot to the wraiths. Ben's father, an employee of The Beast, attempts to recruit Ben and Lindsey into working with The Beast. At first they refuse, but after their dream of opening a sandwich cart is literally crushed, they are forced to accept. On his day off, Ben's father begins to give them a "tour" around the Beast's mansion outside their hometown of Seattle. The mansion is heavily guarded by the Beastly Guards, the Beast's own private army of humans who made the deal with the Antichrist and the wraiths that serve his command. As warned by Ben's father, it is secretly loaded with land mines. The Beast, his guards, and his son Little Beast unexpectedly arrive, interrupting the tour. The Beast becomes smitten with Lindsey and pressures her to marry him and bear his evil children, giving her eight hours to decide before he will kill everyone she knows and loves.

Lindsey consults a Bible and together with Ben hatches a plan to imprison The Beast. They are warned not to kill The Beast as he will just return as Satan. Ben's father had built an escape-proof dog kennel for their pet, so they decide to use it to hold The Beast. They hatch an elaborate plan to isolate The Beast from his guards and the wraiths. They enlist Lindsey's brother and their undead zombie neighbor Mr. Murphy to assist in the plan, and Lindsey returns to The Beast's mansion to be wooed. While Lindsey's brother and his friend smoke pot with the wraiths and their neighbor engages the guards in a distraction, Lindsey attempts to spike The Beast's drink. When he fails to drink it, she is forced to lure him to the pool so that Ben can help her.

Outside, Lindsey begins yelling for Ben who arrives and challenges The Beast to a fight. After mocking Ben, The Beast pulls a gun and attempts to shoot him before Lindsey intervenes. The Beast knocks Ben out with a champagne bottle before being shot by Lindsey. As Ben comes back around, The Beast begins to recover. Lindsey begins shooting him again as Ben brings her more guns. Out of ammunition, they resort to bludgeoning him with a shovel before Ben decides to try and shoot him with a giant poolside laser that The Beast had installed. As Lindsey and Ben try to aim the laser they are blinded by a light coming from the sky. Ben is startled to see a man in white riding a winged horse and shoots him in panic, killing him and the horse.

Ben and Lindsey slowly realize that they've accidentally shot Jesus Christ. There is suddenly lightning from the sky, and the pair are confronted by a man in a white suit whom they realize is God. God angrily explains that Ben and Lindsey have ruined his entire plan involving the fate of all mankind by killing Jesus. Ben and Lindsey at first apologize, but God begins mocking and insulting them. The Beast revives as Satan and sneaks up on God, waylaying him with a shovel and starting a fistfight between the two. The fight spills over into the hot tub, where Satan deliberately drops a boombox in the water and electrocutes them both.

The Beast's guards drive up and see the two bodies. Ben's dad arrives and the men begin arguing over who will take The Beast's place as ruler of the world. Lindsey interrupts to point out with God and Satan dead, everyone is now in charge of themselves. Lindsey and Ben kiss as the men decide what to do now that they are free.

Ben and Lindsey finally open their own sandwich shop (which turns into a thriving lunch destination) and Lindsey is shown visibly pregnant with their child. Little Beast is now happily working with them. Lindsey's mother has made friends with some of the wraiths that are still around and is shown smoking pot with them. Ben's father moves into the mansion and throws a huge party with many other people including Morgan, the Beast's former right-hand man and leader of the now-disbanded Beastly Guards, as they celebrate their freedom with barbeque and salsa loaded with PCP.

== Cast ==
- Craig Robinson as Earl Gundy/"The Beast"
- Anna Kendrick as Lindsey Lewis
- John Francis Daley as Ben House
- Ken Jeong as God
- Rob Corddry as Mr. Walt House
- Thomas Lennon as Mr. Murphy
- Tyler Labine as Shorter Wraith
- Paul Scheer as Security Wraith
- Calum Worthy as Clark Lewis
- John Michael Higgins as Mr. Lyle Lewis
- Ana Gasteyer as Mrs. Lora Lewis
- Rob Huebel as Morgan
- Stephanie Paul as Kimberly
- Jesse Camacho as Fry
- Andrew Fiscella as Beastley
- Jason Gale as Guard Wraith
- Ritchie Singer as Reverend Rick Forrest/"Preacher"
- Adrianna Costa as Liz/"Interviewer"

== Reception ==
Rapture-Palooza received mixed to negative reviews. On review aggregator website Rotten Tomatoes, the film holds an approval rating of 25% based on 20 reviews, with an average rating of 4.18/10. Metacritic gives the film a score of 44 out of 100 based on reviews from nine critics, indicating "mixed or average reviews".

== See also ==
- This Is the End (2013) – another apocalypse-themed comedy which also featured Craig Robinson
- The World's End – another 2013 apocalyptic comedy film
- It's a Disaster – a 2012 black comedy in which couples at a brunch realize that the world is ending
