= Separation City =

- Directed by: Paul Middleditch
- Written by: Tom Scott
- Produced by: San Fu Maltha
- Starring: Joel Edgerton; Rhona Mitra; Danielle Cormack; Les Hill; Thomas Kretschmann; Michelle Langstone; Stephanie Paul
- Cinematography: Steve Arnold
- Edited by: Michael Horton
- Music by: Luke Buda; Samuel Flynn Scott
- Production companies: K5 Film; New Holland Pictures
- Release date: 6 August 2009 (New Zealand)
- Running time: 102 minutes
- Country: New Zealand
- Language: English

Separation City is a 2009 New Zealand film starring Joel Edgerton, Rhona Mitra, Danielle Cormack, and Les Hill. It is directed by Paul Middleditch. Filming concluded in June, 2009, after 5 weeks of shooting.

It is a comedy-drama, following the collapse of two marriages, set in Wellington.

== Plot ==
Simon (Joel Edgerton) is a decent fellow, married to a lovely woman Pam (Danielle Cormack), living comfortably with two children. He has grown tired of the lack of sex and is attracted to a cellist friend of his wife, Katrien (Rhona Mitra).

Katrien travels to New Zealand to follow her husband Klaus (Thomas Kretschmann) in an attempt to rekindle their marriage. However, she catches him in bed with a young arts student and so their marriage collapses. Katrien, now available and lonely from the breakdown of her marriage, is susceptible to Simon's attraction.

The two become fascinated with each other, but don't immediately start an affair. She doesn't want to destroy his greatest appeal, which is that he is upright and reliable. They eventually attempt some meetings, but something always goes wrong. Either he arrives late and the children are coming, or he ejaculates prematurely.

Opportunity comes when they discover that they are both going to be in Germany the same week. Simon books a hotel room in Berlin, where he and his boss are attending a convention. Katrien comes to his room, but before they manage to have sex, his wife surprises him by showing up. Katrien escapes to an adjacent room through an interconnecting door and Simon and his wife make violent love, which Katrien hears through the wall. She gets upset because they were just about to have sex and he is having sex with his wife.

Pam sees Simon sneak into the hallway during a speech and hears Katrien's voice on the other end of his phone, figures out what they are doing, and flies back to Wellington angry. She soon asks for a separation.

Simon professes his love to Katrien, but she says she doesn't love him, so he goes back to Wellington to live near to his wife and children, whom he sees often (his wife slept with Katrien's husband and wants a divorce). His wife eventually forgives him and as the movie ends, we find that Katrien has accepted a job with an orchestra and lives blocks away from her ex-husband who now takes care of the kids.

Early on in the film the five or six wives suggest that the men form an encounter group that meets regularly. At least one of the wives makes it a condition that her husband would be allowed back in the house. The discussions are amusing, but the group disbands after a session that turns into a free-for-all fist fight.

== Cast ==
- Joel Edgerton as Simon
- Danielle Cormack as Pam
- Rhona Mitra as Katrien
- Thomas Kretschmann as Klaus
- Les Hill as Harry Ronayne
- Michelle Langstone as Julie
- Stephanie Paul as Pip

== Availability ==
In North America, Separation City aired on the Encore Drama channel on 2 May 2012. At that time, it was not yet available on DVD for Region 1 or Region 2, but it was for Region 4, which includes Australia and New Zealand.
