= Sauna (2008 film) =

- Directed by: Antti-Jussi Annila
- Written by: Iiro Küttner
- Produced by: Jesse Fryckman; Tero Kaukomaa
- Starring: Ville Virtanen; Tommi Eronen; Viktor Klimenko
- Cinematography: Henri Blomberg
- Edited by: Joona Louhivuori
- Music by: Panu Aaltio
- Production company: Bronson Club
- Distributed by: Sandrew Metronome
- Release dates: 5 September 2008 (Toronto International Film Festival); 24 October 2008 (Finland)
- Running time: 83 minutes
- Country: Finland
- Language: Finnish
- Budget: €930,679

Sauna, also known as Filth or Evil Rising, is a 2008 Finnish horror film directed by Antti-Jussi Annila. The film was awarded three Jussi Awards in 2009: the best sound design, the best scenography and the best costumes. In addition, the film was nominated for best lead actor (Ville Virtanen), best lead actor (Tommi Eronen) and best editing.

== Premise ==
At the end of the Russo-Swedish War (1590-1595), brothers Knut and Eerik are tasked with marking the border between Finland under Swedish rule and the Tsardom of Russia. Eerik is a Stockholm educated cartographer hardened by a long war. On the way, the brothers kill a peasant and lock his daughter in the cellar to die, but in the marshes of the north, the ghost of the girl returns to haunt them. Upon arriving at a mysterious village in the middle of the swamp, the brothers find a sauna in which they hope to be washed of their sins.

== Cast ==
- Ville Virtanen as Eerik
- Tommi Eronen as Knut
- Viktor Klimenko as Semenski
- Rain Tolk as Rogosin
- Kari Ketonen as Musko
- Vilhelmiina Virkkunen as a daughter
- Taisto Reimaluoto as a householder
- Ismo Kallio as a village elder
- Dick Idman as Roukkula
- Kati Outinen as an old woman
- Sonja Petäjäjärvi as a boy

== Release ==
=== Home media ===
The film was released on DVD by Mpi Home Video on October 27, 2009. The DVD has been released in the Nordic countries as well as in Germany, the United States, Australia and the United Kingdom, as well as on blu-ray in Germany.

== Reception ==
French film review website CinemaFantastique.net awarded it 3/4, praising the film's atmosphere, cinematography, and for effectively capturing the 16th century period. However, they criticized the film's non-linear story, and dialogue which made it difficult to fully understand the film. James Gillett from Digital Retribution gave the film a score of 4/5, writing, "Sauna is an impressive film; thematically rich and stunningly realised. It's the kind of horror movie seldom seen. Those who occasionally enjoy something a little more cerebral than your average horror effort will find themselves with a deeply rewarding and engaging film. Wash your sins. Step inside..." David Nusair from Reel Film Reviews, however, panned the film, awarding it no stars out of four, calling it "An abominable, utterly worthless piece of work".
