= Julia Dietze =

German actress (born 1981)

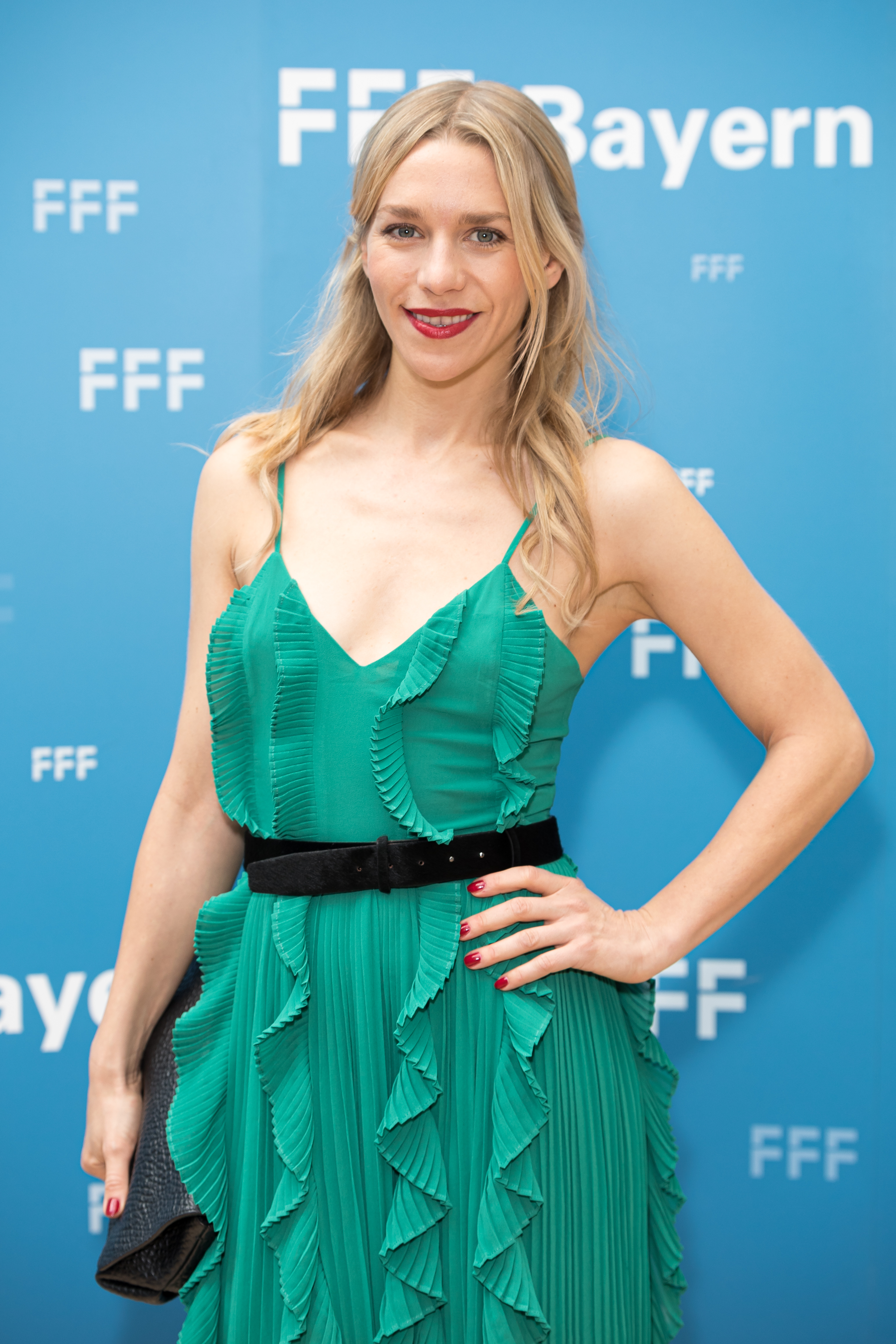
- Dietze, 2018
- Born: 9 January 1981 (age 44); Marseille, France
- Occupation: Actress

Julia Dietze (born on 9 January 1981 in Marseille, France) is a French-born German actress.

== Biography ==
Dietze is the daughter of the German artist, illustrator and painter Mathias Dietze. Her mother is from Marseille. Julia Dietze grew up with her two younger sisters in Munich.

She gained her first film experience in the movies Soloalbum by Gregor Schnitzler, Do Fish Do It? from Almut Getto, and Love in Thoughts by Achim von Borries, and in some TV films, such as Ghetto Kids, Echte Männer? and Die Stimmen.

Her first TV starring role was in Mädchen Nr. 1, directed by Stefan Holtz.

In February 2009, it was announced that Dietze would play the lead role in the science fiction comedy Iron Sky by the Finnish independent director Timo Vuorensola. The film premiered in February 2012. She reprised her role in 2019's Iron Sky: The Coming Race.

In 2021, Dietze caused media outrage with a segment for the Daily Show when she compared U.S. health authorities' actions to combat the COVID-19 pandemic to "Hitler times." In the same interview, she claimed to take dietary advice from her cat.

== Filmography ==
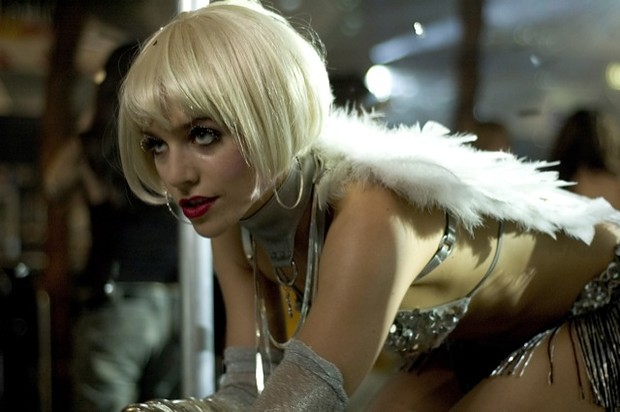
Promotional photo for Little Paris (2008)

Films

- Do Fish Do It? (2001)
- Lili (2003)
- Soloalbum (2003)
- Love in Thoughts (2004)
- Pura Vida Ibiza (2004)
- Schwarze Erdbeeren (2005) – Black Strawberries
- Liebes Leid und Lust (2006) – Love Pain and Pleasure
- Erkan & Stefan in Der Tod kommt krass (2006)
- Oktoberfest (2005)
- Ein Fall für KBBG (2007)
- Warum du schöne Augen hast (2008) – Why Do You Have Beautiful Eyes
- Little Paris (2008)
- Run for Your Life! (2008)
- Robert Zimmermann Is Tangled Up in Love (2008)
- 1½ Knights – In Search of the Ravishing Princess Herzelinde (2008)
- Lucky Fritz (2009)
- 205 - Room of Fear (2011)
- Iron Sky (2012)
- Berlin Kaplanı (2012)
- Bullet (2014)
- Fack ju Göhte 3 (2017)
- Iron Sky: The Coming Race (2019)
- Berlin, I Love You (2019)
