= Network-centric organization =

A network-centric organization is a network governance pattern which empowers knowledge workers to create and leverage information to increase competitive advantage through the collaboration of small and agile self-directed teams. It is emerging in many progressive 21st century enterprises. This implies new ways of working, with consequences for the enterprise’s infrastructure, processes, people and culture.

== Overview ==
With a network-centric configuration, knowledge workers are able to create and leverage information to increase competitive advantage through the collaboration of small and agile self-directed teams. For this, the organizational culture needs to change from one solely determined by a single form of organizing (e.g., hierarchy) to an adaptive hybrid enabling multiple forms of organizing within the same organization. The nature of the work, in an area, determines best the way its conduct is organized and the networked mediation of work activities affords interoperability among differentially-organized areas of work.

A network-centric organization is both a sensible response to a complex environment and an enactor of sensibility on that environment. The business climate of the new millennium is characterized by profound and continuous changes due to globalization, exponential leaps in technological capabilities, and other market forces. Rapid developments of Information and Communication Technologies(ICT) are driving and supporting the change from the industrial to the information age.

In this world of rapid change and uncertainty, organizations need to continually renew, reinvent and reinvigorate themselves in order to respond creatively. The network-centric approach aims to tap into the hidden resources of knowledge workers supported and enabled by ICT, in particular the social technologies associated with Web 2.0 and Enterprise 2.0. Essentially though, a network-centric organization is more about people and culture than technology. A useful survey of network organization theory appears in Van Alstyne (1997)

== Network-centric organization topics ==
=== Knowledge work ===
There is a synthesis of thinking, learning and doing at the core of creative human activity that underpins the concept of knowledge work. Knowledge workers collaborate on tasks that are cognitively demanding, involving complex technical judgements, a high degree of professional and individual expertise and experience. The knowledge worker is astutely aware, not only of the means and purpose of their work, but also its political and social dimensions. Much of this knowledge is tacit and shared among the work group becoming embedded in its culture.

There is a broad expanse of uncharted territory between the real knowledge work that occurs in an organization and the formal organizational structure and espoused practices. The concentration on formal organizational programs aimed at the individual workers ignored the real nature of work practices that reside in a space between the organization and individual perspectives. This space often remains hidden from the organizational landscape, unappreciated and undervalued. Revealing the nature of this hidden space holds the key to understanding knowledge work and is critical to successful organizational outcomes and learning.

=== Hybrid enterprises ===
Many enterprises are hybrids of hierarchical bureaucracies, heterarchic work groups distributed across organizational and spatial boundaries, and responsibly autonomous individuals where competition and cooperation coexist due to a strict division of work activities. Network-centric organizations locate the partitioning of work activities in the self-direction of individuals and work groups, rather than in the hierarchy.

Enterprises which have complex hybrid structures consisting of hierarchies and networks are more like organic eco-systems than machines. The latter are likely to be exploitative and bureaucratic while the former can be networked and innovative. This reflects the tension between the natural tendency for disorder to increase while humans strive to impose order by developing ever more complex rigid structures and systems. It is quite a natural state of affairs that organizations can be part mechanistic and part organic with continual transformations among these forms. Network-centric organizations enact governance systems that manage these ongoing transformations.

=== Sensible organization ===
A complex environment presents an enterprise with too large a range and diversity of inputs to comprehend logically, so the sensible response is not to try. Attempts to deal with complexity are unsuccessful if they aim to either simplify or assert control over complex situations. It makes more sense to maintain and support the natural creative energies of complex environments, encouraging the emergence of innovative new forms of working.

Sensible enterprises will become agile, flexible and adaptable by incorporating more creativity and diversity into their structures, processes and human resources. The informality, interactivity and adaptability of small teams of people retains a space for what we traditionally call ‘common sense’ for both understanding and action amid the accountability and constraints of the formal enterprise. Sensible managers will relinquish some of their traditional control to knowledge workers in small self-directed teams. A network-centric organization will also have an increased need and reliance on data sensing, analysis, and closed-loop action driven by repeated application of "sense-and-respond" cycle.

=== Social technologies ===
At the current time, a new civil digital culture has taken hold, in which so-called ‘social’ and/or ‘conversational’ technologies or social software are providing unprecedented opportunities for everyday user activities. The term Web 2.0 has entered the vocabulary to reflect the ongoing transition of the World Wide Web from a collection of websites to a full-fledged computing platform serving social web applications such as email, discussion forums, chatrooms, Weblogs and Wikis to end users. Constructivist learning theorists (Vygotsky, 1978; Leidner & Jarvenpaa, 1995 explained that the process of expressing knowledge aids its creation and conversations benefits the refinement of knowledge. Cheung et al. (2005) maintains that conversational knowledge management fulfils this purpose because conversations, e.g. questions and answers, become the source of relevant knowledge.

Social technologies facilitate processes where knowledge creation and storage is carried out through a discussion forum where participants contribute to the discussion with questions and answers, or through a Weblog which is typified by a process of storytelling or through a Wiki using collaborative writing (Hasan and Pfaff 2006). In the corporate setting, the term Enterprise 2.0 is emerging to reflect the use of freeform social software within companies to support work units and the individual knowledge worker. Gordon and Ganesan (2005) advocate a different vision for knowledge management systems to one that is specifically targeted to the capture and use of the stories told in communities and organizations in the context of normal, spoken conversations.

Conversation and other types of human-human communication must be exploited in today’s knowledge management systems to harness the value of conversation in packaging and transmitting tacit knowledge. The attraction of these social technologies is their low cost, intuitive functionality and connectivity. Social technologies support new forms of network-centric interaction and activity between people, allowing and enhancing informal access to create and distribute information. These technologies empower ordinary people to have a global presence for business, political and social purposes. The new social technologies at the focus of this project are tools of a rising digital democracy.

One of the newest approaches on the horizon is worknetting. A worknet is a form of organization where stakeholders, individuals or institutions or both, can come together around a shared purpose. Whereas a network centres on the relationships between partners, a worknet centres on each partner's relationship with the shared purpose. In this way, the unique strengths and contributions of each partner can be optimized and enhanced, as they are situated in the context of the worknets common interest.

=== Power shift in traditional organizations ===
Traditional organizations that favor a rigid hierarchical structure and ego-centric methods still employ the outmoded concept where the decision-making authority lies solely in the domain of its corporate headquarters. Changes resulting from developments in ICT and the growth of the Internet, have made it increasingly difficult to provide a platform for effective and efficient management and operations. As observed by De Vulpian (2005), “we are in the process of moving from a pyramidal, hierarchical society to a single-story society where heterarchical relationships dominate”.

There is a tension between ego-centric thinking and network-centric thinking – the tension between the institutional power that emanates from an organization and the transactional power that inheres in its members' daily interactions. Progressive organizations are tending to refocus on supporting teams in community-style networks. There is a growing realization that if "decisions are allowed to move out of the corporate headquarters to individual business units, business units will in turn distribute power and decision-making to self-managed teams and profit centers (Allee 2003).” This is the basis of the concept of knowledge work where workers have control over their own activities through knowledge acquired in the course of both training and experience.

== Links to network centric warfare ==
Network-centric warfare is a simple concept that involves the linkage of engagement systems to sensors through networks and the sharing of information between force elements. The early development of the concept evolved by connecting information systems and creating software applications that allow people to use the available data. McKenna, Moon, Davis and Warne (2006) emphasise on the human dimension of NCW which is based on the idea that information is only useful if it allows people to act more effectively.

== See also ==
- Analytics
- Commons-based peer production
- Complex systems
- Network governance
- Organizational learning
- Self-organization
- Sensemaking
- Teamwork
- Value network
- Value network analysis
- Worknetting
- Rhizome
