= Gerry Kissell =

American comic book artist (born 1964)

- Born: May 19, 1964 (age 62) Granite City, Illinois, United States
- Areas: Penciller, Artist, Inker, Colourist
- Notable works: Army of Two; The A-Team: War Stories; Alan Wake

Gerry Kissell (born May 19, 1964) is an American comic book artist and former U.S. Army combat medic.

Kissell has contributed to several graphic novels published by IDW Publishing, including Code Word: Geronimo, The A-Team: War Stories, and Iron Sky: Bad Moon Rising.

In addition to his work in comics, Kissell has illustrated book covers for authors such as Dale Dye and John M. Del Vecchio. He has also designed logos for various veteran-associated companies including those of Dye’s organizations, Warriors Inc. and Warriors Publishing Group.

== Projects ==
On October 5, 2011 Blind Spot Pictures released a digital comic prequel to the Iron Sky film, titled Iron Sky: Bad Moon Rising, written by Mikko Rautalahti, and fully illustrated by Kissell. IDW Publishing printed these comics in a softcover graphic novel collection in March 2013.

In 2012 Kissell and a team of military veterans, together with actor Kurt Yaeger, began developing Vindicated Inc., a military-themed graphic novel series referring to itself as the 'First-Ever Disabled Veteran Action Hero Comic'. Yaeger served as the model for the lead character in the book because he himself has a prosthetic leg. Other film and television actors appear in the book including Dale Dye, Erik Audé, Aaron Douglas, Chance Kelly, as well as author Shane Moore, creator of the horror book series The Apocalypse of Enoch. Moore also served as a writer on part of the Vindicated Inc. graphic novel. The book series deals with the perception of disabilities as well as PTSD.

In December 2013 Xbox released a special collector's edition of the horror game Alan Wake. The disc featured new content including a 44-page digital comic book with art by Gerry Kissell and Amin Amat. The comic book was written by Remedy Entertainment's Mikko Rautalahti who also wrote the script for the video game.

On the 950th anniversary of the Battle of Hastings (October 14, 2016) a commemorative 124-page graphic novel was released by Tapestry Comics entitled Bayeux, after the Bayeux Tapestry. It was written by history teacher Tyler Button and told the story of the Battle of Hastings as well as the incidents leading up to the battle, including the Battle of Stamford Bridge, where the last Viking King Harald Hardrada was killed by King Harold Godwinson's forces.
