= Jade Warrior (film) =

2006 Finnish-Chinese film by Antti-Jussi Annila

- Theatrical release poster
- Directed by: Antti-Jussi Annila
- Written by: Antti-Jussi Annila; Petri Jokiranta; Iiro Küttner (story)
- Produced by: Petri Jokiranta; Tero Kaukomaa; Margus Õunapuu; Peter Loehr; San Fu Maltha
- Starring: Tommi Eronen; Zhang Jingchu; Krista Kosonen; Markku Peltola
- Cinematography: Henri Blomberg
- Edited by: Iikka Hesse
- Music by: Samuli Kosminen; Kimmo Pohjonen
- Distributed by: Blind Spot Pictures
- Release dates: 13 October 2006 (Finland); 20 October 2006 (Estonia); 24 October 2006 (China)
- Running time: 110 minutes
- Countries: Finland; China; Estonia; Netherlands
- Languages: Finnish; Mandarin
- Budget: €2.5 million

Jade Warrior (Finnish: Jadesoturi, Chinese: 玉战士; pinyin: Yù zhànshì) is a Finnish-Chinese co-produced martial arts fantasy film. It combines elements of the wuxia genre with Finnish Kalevala mythology. It was directed by Antti-Jussi Annila.

The movie opened in Finland on 13 October 2006 with 40 copies. The film debuted at #2, right after The Devil Wears Prada. It opened in China on 24 October with 150 copies in 70 cities. Jade Warrior is the first Finnish movie to be released in movie theaters in China. In addition to China, the movie's international distribution rights have been sold to more than 30 countries. In Finland, the movie grossed €607,038 with 79,050 tickets sold.

In 2007, Jade Warrior received the Jussi Award for Best Costume Design (Anna Vilppunen) and Best Film Score (Kimmo Pohjonen and Samuli Kosminen).

== Plot ==
Inspired by the Finnish epic The Kalevala, the story opens with a down-on-his luck novice blacksmith named Kai whose girlfriend, Ronja, leaves him. Ronja tries to dispose of his collection of Asian artifacts and what appears to be an urn full of ashes at an antique dealer. The ashes are his burned up hair and nail clippings, used by blacksmiths to prevent rust. This sets off a mythical series of events that holds Ronja back from leaving town. The ashes open a mythical chest, which causes Kai to remember a past life where he was a half-Chinese half-Finnish warrior named Sintai, fated to battle a demon in ancient China, threatening to enslave all of humankind.

Sintai is fated to be rewarded with Nirvana upon dying in that lifetime if he killed the demon. Sintai is abetted—and then ultimately disheartened—by a female warrior named Pin Yu, who has captured his heart. Shortly after, Pin Yu unexpectedly finds her lost lover, Cho, who is Sintai's friend. Upon realizing this, Sintai uses a magical chest to imprison the demon and escape Nirvana. He then commits suicide to be reborn as Kai, who is being instructed by the now freed demon to build the Sampo, an item that will open the gates to hell. Kai's remembering and the sampo building are transposed to each other. Finally, Kai realizes what he has done and knows his complete past life and, with Pin Yu now reincarnated as Ronja and potentially returned to his side, he decides to fulfill his original quest and kill the demon.

== Cast ==
- Tommi Eronen – Kai/Sintai, a blacksmith and son of a blacksmith
- Markku Peltola – Berg, Weckström's partner
- Krista Kosonen – Ronja, ex-girlfriend of Kai
- Zhang Jingchu – Pin Yu
- Elle Kull – Weckström, an archaeologist
- Taiseng Cheng – Demon (as Cheng Taishen)
- Hao Dang – Cho

== Reception ==
The reception of the Jade Warrior was critical in China. Reviews in local newspapers criticized the film as difficult to understand: it takes place both in Finland and China and even in different time periods. In addition, the Mandarin pronunciation of the Finnish actors was considered ridiculous rather than good.

=== Reviews ===
- CineFantastico.com link (in Spanish)
- Cinematic Happenings Under Development link (in English)
- Twitch Films link (in English)

== Soundtrack ==
Jade Warrior

Soundtrack album by Various Artists
- Released: 11 October 2006
- Recorded: 2005–2006
- Genre: Soundtrack
- Label: Bonnier Amigo Music Finland

Singles from Jade Warrior
- 1. "Fate" Released: 2006; 2. "Sorry Go 'Round" Released: 2006

According to the MTV3 website, the soundtrack was released on 11 October 2006.

#	Title	Artist(s)
01.	"Fate" (movie version)	Bleak feat. Ana Johnsson and Kimmo Pohjonen	4:22
02.	"Under the Rose"	HIM	4:49
03.	"Romeo"	Sunrise Avenue	4:03
04.	"Sorry Go 'Round"	Poets of the Fall	3:40
05.	"New Day"	Deep Insight	3:38
06.	"Scream"	Dame	3:00
07.	"Crossword"	Bleak	3:40
08.	"Days of Summer"	Ana Johnsson	3:10
09.	"Wear Out the Soles"	Brightboy	2:57
10.	"Grace"	The Crash	3:46
11.	"Savior"	Christel Sundberg	4:22
12.	"Routa"	Kimmo Pohjonen/Samuli Kosminen Kluster
13.	"Unia"	Kimmo Pohjonen/Samuli Kosminen Kluster
14.	"Kalvaja"	Kimmo Pohjonen/Samuli Kosminen Kluster
15.	"Vala"	Kimmo Pohjonen/Samuli Kosminen Kluster
