= Iron Sky: The Coming Race =

2019 science fiction comedy film by Timo Vuorensola

- International theatrical release poster
- Directed by: Timo Vuorensola
- Written by: Dalan Musson
- Story by: Johanna Sinisalo; Timo Vuorensola; Jarmo Puskala; Tero Kaukomaa; Samuli Torssonen
- Produced by: Peter De Maegd; Tom Hameeuw; Oliver Damian; Tero Kaukomaa
- Starring: Lara Rossi; Vladimir Burlakov; Kit Dale; Julia Dietze; Stephanie Paul; Tom Green; Udo Kier
- Cinematography: Mika Orasmaa
- Edited by: Joona Louhivuori; Jan Hameeuw
- Music by: Laibach; Tuomas Kantelinen
- Production companies: Iron Sky Universe; 27 Films Production; Potemkino
- Distributed by: SF Film Finland (Finland); Splendid Film (Germany)
- Release dates: 16 January 2019 (Finland); 21 March 2019 (Germany)
- Running time: 93 minutes
- Countries: Finland; Germany; Belgium
- Languages: English; German
- Budget: €17 million
- Box office: $400,000 (Germany, Poland and Turkey)

Iron Sky: The Coming Race is a 2019 science fiction comedy action film directed by Timo Vuorensola and written by Dalan Musson from a story by Johanna Sinisalo, Vuorensola, Jarmo Puskala, Tero Kaukomaa, and Samuli Torssonen. The sequel to Iron Sky (2012), its production was crowdfunded through Indiegogo. Like its predecessor, the film mixes political themes with repeated allusions to the popular culture and various conspiracy theories, but is generally more action-adventure oriented. A major inspiration of the story (and title) is the 1871 novel Vril: The Power of the Coming Race by Edward Bulwer-Lytton.

The plot follows a group of nuclear holocaust survivors living in an abandoned Nazi base on the far side of the Moon. Boarding a barely-functioning spacecraft, they travel to the nucleus of the hollow Earth in an attempt to recover the Holy Grail from a group of reptilian shape-shifters who are led by Tyrannosaurus-riding Adolf Hitler.

Produced on a budget of 17 million euros, The Coming Race is the most expensive Finnish live-action picture ever made. The production suffered from repeated delays and a two-part copyright dispute, with a Finnish court denying that copyright even existed in the subject matter of the case apart from one 3D model, the Japanese ship. The second half of the case was a counterclaim by the production companies to sue the original Iron Sky 3D artists for continued use of their work. The court ruled that the production companies had not shown any evidence of copyright ownership themselves and dismissed the counterclaim.

The Coming Race was released on 16 January 2019 in Finland, but performed very poorly in the box office. Most reviews were negative, citing problems such as unidimensional characters, low-quality CGI, dated jokes, and confused script. The self-conscious ludicrousness of the storyline divided critics, with some finding it amusing while others criticized it as disorienting and unfunny. Lara Rossi's and Udo Kier's performances were praised by some reviewers.

== Plot ==
The year is 2047, 29 years after the nuclear war immediately following the battle between the Earth and Moon Nazis rendered the planet inhospitable. The last survivors have rallied together on "Neomenia", the former Moon Nazi base on the far side of the Moon, struggling to coexist with the former Moon Nazis who also live in the base. Over the years, the base has started to deteriorate, due to overpopulation and the damage on the Moon caused by the battle. Meanwhile, Jobsism, a cult formed around the teachings of Steve Jobs and their leader, Donald, has become the Moon base's official religion.

Obi Washington, daughter of James Washington (who has since passed away) and Renate Richter, has spent her life keeping Neomenia's life support systems functional. While examining a Russian refugee ship, she encounters Wolfgang Kortzfleisch, the long-presumed-dead former Moonführer, who gives her Vrilia, the cure to Renate's terminal illness. When Renate's health is restored, Kortzfleisch reveals to Obi that he is a Vril, a race of Reptilians that arrived on Earth during the age of the dinosaurs. While studying the primates that emerged during prehistory, Kortzfleisch created humankind by injecting Vrilia into an apple and feeding it to his monkeys, Adam and Eve. Once mankind evolved, the Vril went underground into the center of the Earth. Kortzfleisch offers Obi a mission to travel to the subterranean city of Agartha and take the city's Vrilia to ensure the survival of her colony. Obi, along with the refugee ship's pilot, Sasha, security officer Malcolm, and the Jobsists, fly to Antarctica and crash in the Hollow Earth.

In Agartha, the Vril, who have been masquerading as world leaders throughout history, kill the President of the United States for making the surface world uninhabitable. The Jobsists and Malcolm are captured by Steve Jobs and brought to Adolf Hitler, and Donald offers Hitler the whereabouts of Kortzfleisch in exchange for the Jobsists to live in Agartha, only for Hitler to betray them and have Jobs eat the Jobsists. Meanwhile, Obi and Sasha take the Holy Grail, the source of the Vrilia, but cause Agartha's sun to collapse and destroy the city. Malcolm escapes from captivity and rejoins Obi and Sasha before they fly back to Neomenia. Hitler launches the Vril spaceship out of Antarctica to follow them. Upon the trio's arrival, Kortzfleisch holds Renate hostage for Obi to surrender the Holy Grail, but Hitler and his pet Tyrannosaurus, Blondi, invade the Moon base. After drinking from the Holy Grail, a rejuvenated Renate confronts and kills Hitler, but is mortally wounded by Kortzfleisch. Obi, Sasha, Malcolm, and the surviving inhabitants escape in an old ship, but Kortzfleisch chases after them. Using Sasha's old Nokia 3310, Obi hacks into Donald's iPhone, triggering the self-destruct mechanism and destroying the Vril spaceship.

During dinner, Malcolm comes out as gay, but collapses and seemingly dies from allergens in the food. Both he and Renate are given a space funeral, but Malcolm suddenly gets out of his coffin, revealing that he only went into a short coma, a condition he has had since childhood. As the ship makes its long travel to Mars, Obi and Sasha express their love for each other.

In a mid-credit sequence, it is revealed that Mars has been colonized by the Soviet Union.

== Cast ==
- Lara Rossi as Obianaju "Obi" Washington
- Vladimir Burlakov as Sasha
- Kit Dale as Malcolm
- Julia Dietze as Renate Richter
- Stephanie Paul as the President of the United States (a parody of Sarah Palin) who is secretly a Vril
- Tom Green as Donald
- Udo Kier as Wolfgang Kortzfleisch / Vril Adolf Hitler
- John Flanders as Gary the Base Commander
- James Quinn as Deputy Commander Johan
- Emily Atack as Tyler
- Martin Swabey as Ryan
- Pierce Baechler as the Altar Boy
- Christoph Drobig as the Guilty Jobsist
- Edward Judge as Fat Tyler
- Kari Berg as Lena the Jobsist
- Victor Au as a Vril Officer
- Vasco De Beukelaer as the Vril Chairman
- Muya Lubambu Tshinioka as Vril Idi Amin
- Antoine Plaisant as Vril Mark Zuckerberg
- Amanda Wolzak as Vril Margaret Thatcher
- Francesco Italiano as Vril Caligula
- Duta Skhirtladze as Vril Joseph Stalin
- Jukka Hilden as Vril Pope Urban II
- Abbas Shirafkan as Vril Osama bin Laden
- Kari Ketonen as Vril Vladimir Putin
- Hon Ping Tang as Vril Genghis Khan
- Lloyd Lai as Vril Kim Jong Un
- Tero Kaukomaa as Vril Urho Kekkonen
- Gaëtan Wenders as Vril Steve Jobs
- Alexander Moens as Vril Temple Guard
- Alan Lumb as Vril Temple Guard and Moonbase Citizen

== Production ==
On 20 May 2012, Tero Kaukomaa, producer of the first film, announced that there were plans for a prequel or a sequel but refused to disclose details. In May 2013, Vuorensola announced that Iron Sky would have a sequel titled Iron Sky The Coming Race. He also mentioned that unlike the first film, this installment would be completely funded by fans via Indiegogo, with an estimated budget of US$15 million. A promo video was shot for the 2014 Cannes Film Festival and the final draft of the script was scheduled to be published by the end of 2014. Filming was expected to begin in 2015. In July 2013, Vuorensola revealed Croatia as one of the proposed shooting locations. In February 2014, Dalan Musson signed in to write the screenplay. The Finnish Film Foundation and Medienboard Berlin-Brandenburg had come on board to finance the US$13 million project. On 5 November 2014, Iron Sky Universe launched another crowdfunding campaign to raise US$500,000 before 20 December. At the closing of the campaign on 5 January, contributors pledged a grand total of US$560,949.

On 22 November 2014, Lloyd Kaufman of Troma Entertainment confirmed having a cameo role in the film.

On 18 September 2015, Vuorensola announced that filming would commence at AED Studios in Belgium.

In October 2016, Timo Vuorensola launched a new crowdfunding campaign to fund special effects for out-of-budget scenes that were in danger of being left out from the final cut of the movie. The scenes included the deaths of reptilian Margaret Thatcher and Pope Urban II.

In the spring of 2017, the company responsible for the effects revised its cost calculations, and suddenly $2.5 million was missing from the film's budget. Due to the delay, one of the film's major funders, Universal Studios, which was also one of the distributors of the first film, withdrew from the project, and the entire production had to be suspended. The project had to stand still for 1.5 years before it was finally completed in 2019 with Chinese funding.

=== Copyright dispute ===
In the summer of 2017 a number of original Iron Sky VFX artists filed a suit in Finland against Iron Sky Universe Oy and Blind Spot Pictures Oy. "The plaintiffs claim their creative contribution to the Iron Sky franchise is such that they should also be considered as joint copyright holders of the original movie." In May 2018, the Finnish market court ruled that the artists have no copyright under sections 2, 6 and 46a of the Finnish copyright act in relation to Iron Sky and its material. The court awarded copyright to a single artist in the case of a Japanese ship design used in the film, but ruled that the copyright for only that ship had legally transferred to Blind Spot Pictures. In addition, the production companies filed a counterclaim asking the Finnish Market Courts to confirm that the VFX artists had no copyright in the films or in any material made by them and that the VFX artists had no right to use any material related to them. However, Finnish Market Courts rejected the production companies counterclaim.

In 2025, the U.S. Copyright Office ruled that artists who worked on the original Iron Sky, including Trevor Baylis, were joint authors of the film under U.S. copyright law.

== Themes ==
Like its predecessor, the movie refers to several motifs of post-war Esoteric Nazism, such as the Hollow Earth theory. The movie's title is a reference to Edward Bulwer-Lytton's novel The Coming Race (1871) that is commonly regarded as the origin of the so-called Vril myth. The film teaser features the Vril symbol that was designed by the Tempelhofgesellschaft in the 1990s.

== Release ==
Release was originally announced for 14 February 2018, but had been postponed to 22 August 2018 in Finland followed by the rest of the world soon after, if not the same time. However, according to reports in the Finnish press, the release date of 22 August 2018 had been cancelled. It was later announced that the film was scheduled to be released on 16 January 2019 as the Fan World Premiere in Helsinki, Finland.

== Reception ==
=== Box office ===
The film did not do well in the box office. In Finland, it had close to 32,000 viewers, less than one-fifth of the previous film. The box office for Germany, Poland and Turkey and by July 2019 was less than US$400,000.

=== Critical response ===
Following its premiere on January 16, 2019, in Helsinki, Finland, Iron Sky: The Coming Race attracted hostile reviews. Foreign reviews were generally negative as well. Review aggregator website Rotten Tomatoes reports an approval rating of 29%, based on seven reviews.

Juho Typpö of Helsingin Sanomat called Iron Sky: The Coming Race an ”awfully bad movie”, awarding it one star out of five. The comedy built upon ”crazy and ludicrous twists” fails to entertain or amuse, and the entire film ends up being ”but a big joke” that provides the audience no reason to care. The potential of once-topical themes (such as Sarah Palin and Steve Jobs) was lost due to the prolonged production, and even the budget of 20 million — an all-time record for a Finnish live-action movie — was seemingly wasted, resulting in confined set-pieces and CGI of uneven quality. Jouni Vikman of Episodi also gave the film one star, criticizing ”old jokes that would not have been funny even if they were new”. The special effect sequences, supposedly the main attraction, were too brief to his tastes and ”reminiscent of a cheap TV-series”. He was impressed by Lara Rossi, especially considering the fact that many scenes were filmed in front of the green screen, whereas ”the veteran actors Udo Kier and Tom Green only manage to survive by ignoring their surroundings”. Jonni Aromaa from Yle News called Iron Sky: The Coming Race one of the worst films ever made, citing cardboard characters, subpar dialogue, unfunny humor, and low quality of the dinosaur effects. He was particularly critical of the screenplay: ”Why on earth was the script written by the American Dalan Musson, a friend of Vuorensola’s? Was it really so that no one else was available on this planet?”

Other reviews were more positive. Tapani Peltonen from V2 awarded Iron Sky: The Coming Race two stars out of five, describing the film as a ”wild and free” alternative to the homogenous mass of calculated Hollywood productions, but remarked that many such alternative productions struggle with even the very basics of filmmaking, failing to flesh out captivating characters. Helinä Laajalahti from Muropaketti gave the film three stars of out five and lauded it for its ambition. She, however, noted that ”the abundance of details and references embedded in the story threaten to turn against itself” and felt the film would have benefited from a more focused approach. Janne Kaakko of Aamulehti called the film a sequel that managed to be even more ”colorful, crackpot, and nerdy” than the original, giving it three stars out of five. Martta Kaukonen of Me Naiset likewise awarded the film three stars and said it was as entertaining as the original Iron Sky. She enjoyed the ”delicious” characterization and praised Kier's dual role.

Sophie Monks Kaufman of The Guardian gave the film one out of five stars, calling it a ”scattershot, stakes-free, self-consciously wacky space comedy”. She criticized its unidimensional characters and superficial script, noting a tendency to introduce illogical elements with little relation to the rest of the plot, seemingly for the sake of sheer surrealness. Nonetheless, Kaufman praised Lara Rossi's committed performance ”as a grounding presence in a gravity-free spectacle”. Noel Murray of Los Angeles Times called The Coming Race a ”goofy science-fiction picture”. He noted that the film repeatedly alludes to Russian interference in the 2016 United States elections and other provocative themes, but — not unlike its predecessor — remains unable to provide actual satire. Murray described The Coming Race ”frustratingly unfocused” both as a story and as a commentary of the modern era. Just the same, he found the hollow Earth sequence ”suitably wacky”. Joey Magidson of Hollywood News noted the potentially entertaining premise, but concluded that the film was ”largely a bore and a mess”. He awarded the film 1.5 stars out of 4. Brian Orndorfstein of Blu-ray.com called the film ”noisy and unfunny” and gave it 3 stars out of 10. Orndorf's criticisms included ”pawing at [...] obvious political targets” and ”relentless absurdity”.

On the other hand, Samantha Nelson, writing for The Verge, enjoyed the ”uniquely bizarre form of movie magic”. She found the film mostly void of the original's ”dark political comedy”, being more focused on campy adventure and absurd expositions delivered by Udo Kier. The storyline offers "plenty of opportunities for spectacle" and comedic commentary of film tropes, and the special effects show significant improvement over those in the first film. On the downside, The Coming Race’s high-speed plot prevents it from giving necessary focus on any single theme.

== Planned sequel, bankruptcy ==
In 2016, despite production company Iron Sky Universe struggling to get enough financing to complete its four-year effort to finish Iron Sky: The Coming Race, it was already announcing plans for a third film, Iron Sky: The Ark, with a 2018 release date.

In 2017, with the unfinished Iron Sky: The Coming Race in its fifth year of effort, a teaser trailer was released for Iron Sky: The Ark, showing only special effects shots but no actors and no action.

The likelihood of Iron Sky: The Ark was put in doubt in late 2019 when, a few months after Iron Sky: The Coming Race had been released, crowdfunding participants in the second film started complaining that the production company was not fulfilling the delivery of promised perks from the Indiegogo crowdfunding platform; Iron Sky Universe replied with an update citing the "very challenging financial situation for the company", and stating that it could not even confirm if the perks would be "... coming at all."

In September 2019, Blind Spot Pictures, the main production company for the Iron Sky franchise, declared bankruptcy and ceased operations. In October 2020, it was reported production company Iron Sky Universe had filed for bankruptcy in Finland. This was confirmed by Timo Vuorensola, the Iron Sky franchise film director and Iron Sky Universe co-owner, saying: "The production company of Iron Sky, called Iron Sky Universe, one which I jointly set up with Tero, is going under."

== See also ==
- List of films featuring dinosaurs
