= Samuli Torssonen =

Finnish film director (born 1978)

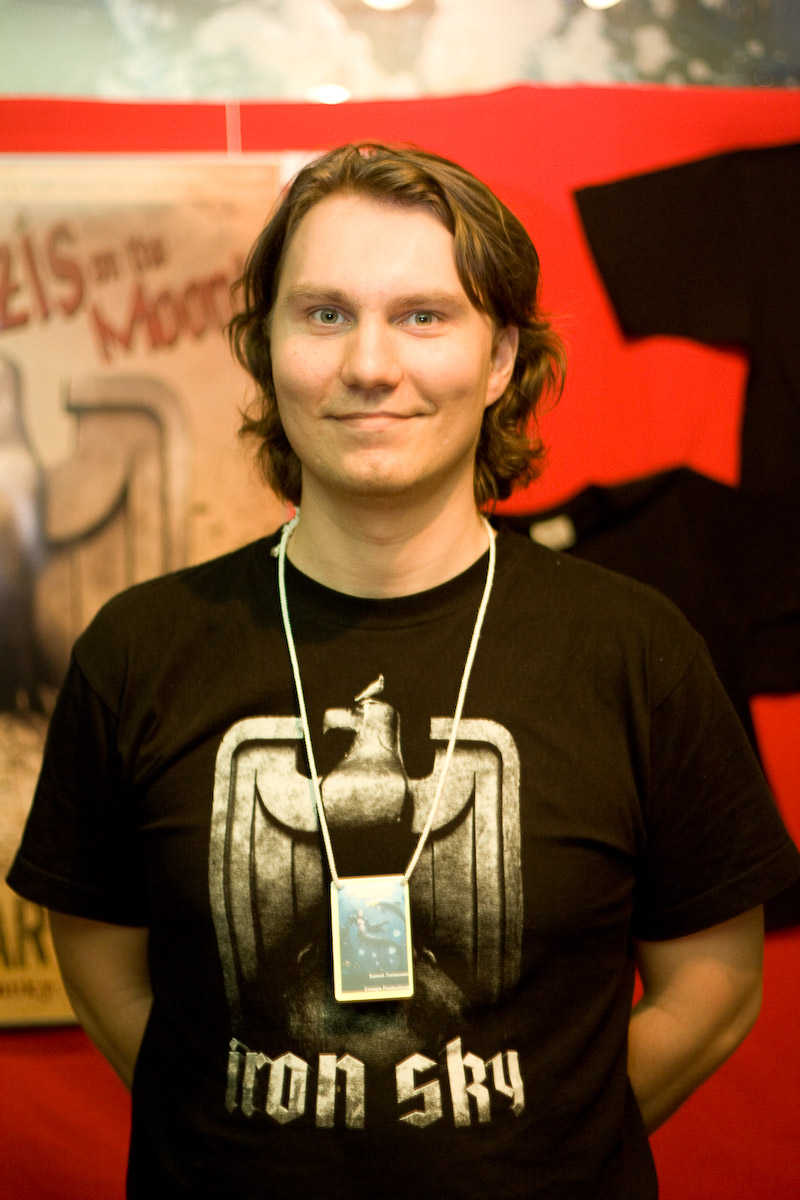
- Torssonen in 2008
- Born: 12 November 1978 (age 47); Finland
- Occupations: CEO and producer, Energia Productions
- Known for: Star Wreck

Samuli Torssonen (born 12 November 1978) is a Finnish film writer, director, actor and producer, best known as the creator of the viral Star Wreck sci-fi series.

He was a producer and special-effects supervisor of the movie Iron Sky.

== Film career ==
The first Torssonen Star Wreck film (in 1992) was a computer graphics-oriented short film of space battles, produced by Torssonen himself, but later Torssonen recruited his friends to help him in these productions. One of them was Rudi Airisto, who helped him to add parody aspects to the Star Wreck films.

After four animated short films, Torssonen and his friends released Star Wreck V: Lost Contact (in 1997).

Torssonen's long-lasting dream had been to create the sixth and possibly final episode for Star Wreck saga. At first Torssonen thought that it would only be a 15-minute-long special-effects packaged short film. After Airisto moved to the UK to study, Torssonen asked Timo Vuorensola to be the director. Star Wreck IV½: Weak Performance was released (in 2000) and was followed by the feature length conclusion to the series, Star Wreck: In the Pirkinning (released in 2005).

The Star Wreck series contains quirky Finnish and "Trekkish" humour, with elements parodying both Star Trek and Babylon 5.

Torssonen himself acts in the Star Wreck adventures as main character James B. Pirk (named after the Star Trek character James T. Kirk), captain of the starship C.P.P. Potkustartti (Kickstart).

Torssonen and his Star Wreck movies have been a small cult hit.

== Filmography ==
Following is a filmography of Samuli Torssonen as a writer/producer. He has made all of his films besides Iron Sky in Finnish, but all are subtitled in English.

=== Short films ===
- Star Wreck (1992)
- Star Wreck II: The Old Shit (1994)
- Star Wreck III: Wrath of the Romuclans (1995)
- Star Wreck IV: The Kilpailu (1996)
- Star Wreck V: Lost Contact (1997)
- Star Wreck 4½: Weak Performance (2000)

=== Full-length films ===
- Star Wreck: In the Pirkinning (2005)
- Iron Sky (2012)

== See also ==
- List of Finns
