= Timo Vuorensola =

Finnish actor and film director (born 1979)

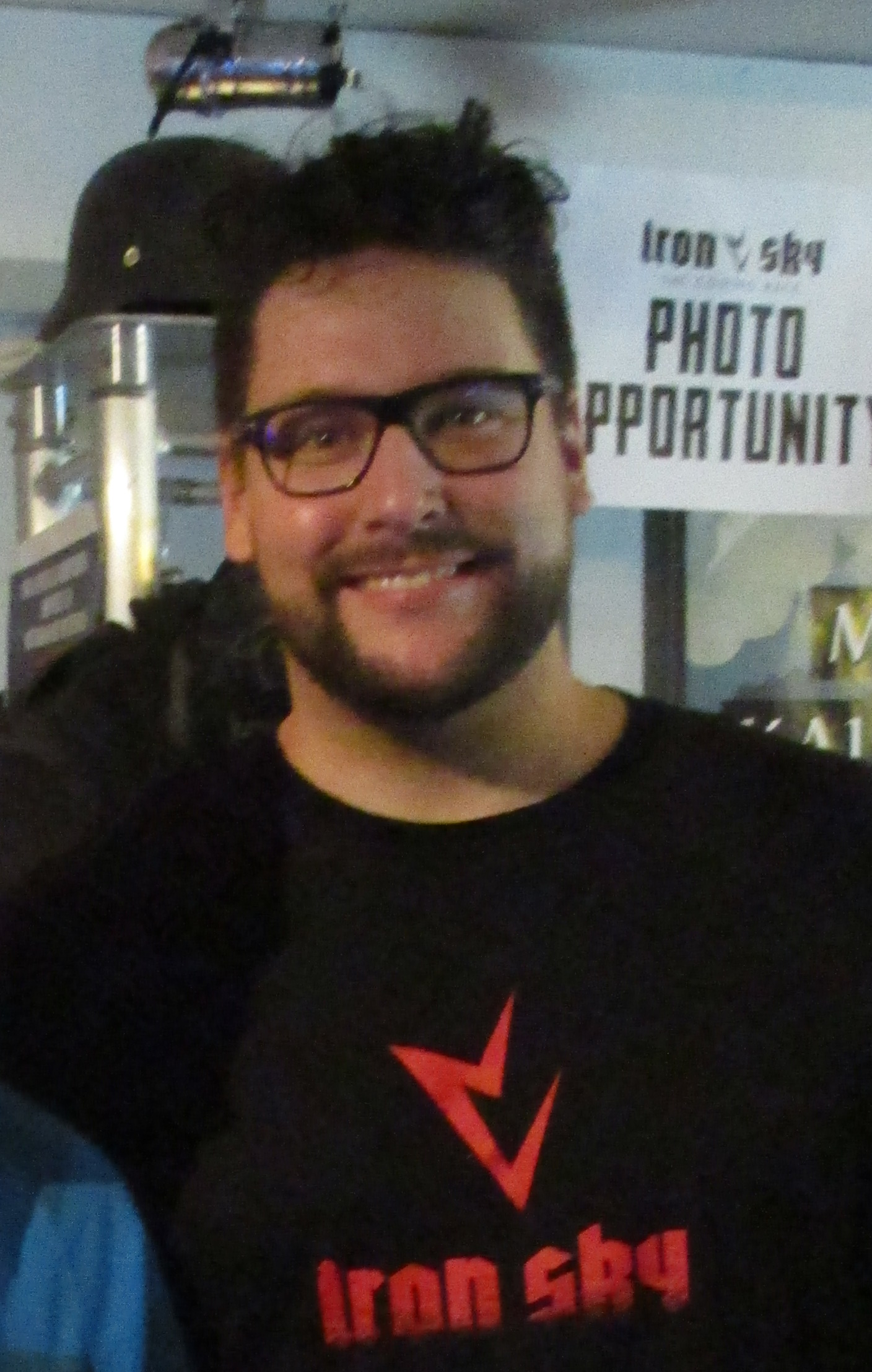
- Vuorensola in 2016
- Born: 29 November 1979 (age 45); Helsinki, Finland
- Occupation(s): Actor, film director, singer

Timo Vuorensola (Finnish pronunciation: [ˈtimo ˈʋuo̯renˌsolɑ]; born 29 November 1979) is a Finnish film director, singer and actor. He has directed Star Wreck movies Star Wreck V: Lost Contact, and Star Wreck: In the Pirkinning, created by Samuli Torssonen. Vuorensola plays Lieutenant Dwarf in the films. He also directed the film Iron Sky and its sequel, Iron Sky: The Coming Race. He is also the lead vocalist and co-founder of dark industrial band Älymystö.

The 2022 film Jeepers Creepers: Reborn, a reboot of the cult film series, is the first American film directed by Vuorensola.

Vuorensola has unsuccessfully sought funding for other film projects. In 2012, it was reported that he was shopping a proposed film to be called I Killed Adolf Hitler, and another to be called Jeremiah Harm. In 2023, it was reported that he was shopping a proposed film to be called Killtown.

== Filmography ==
=== Films ===
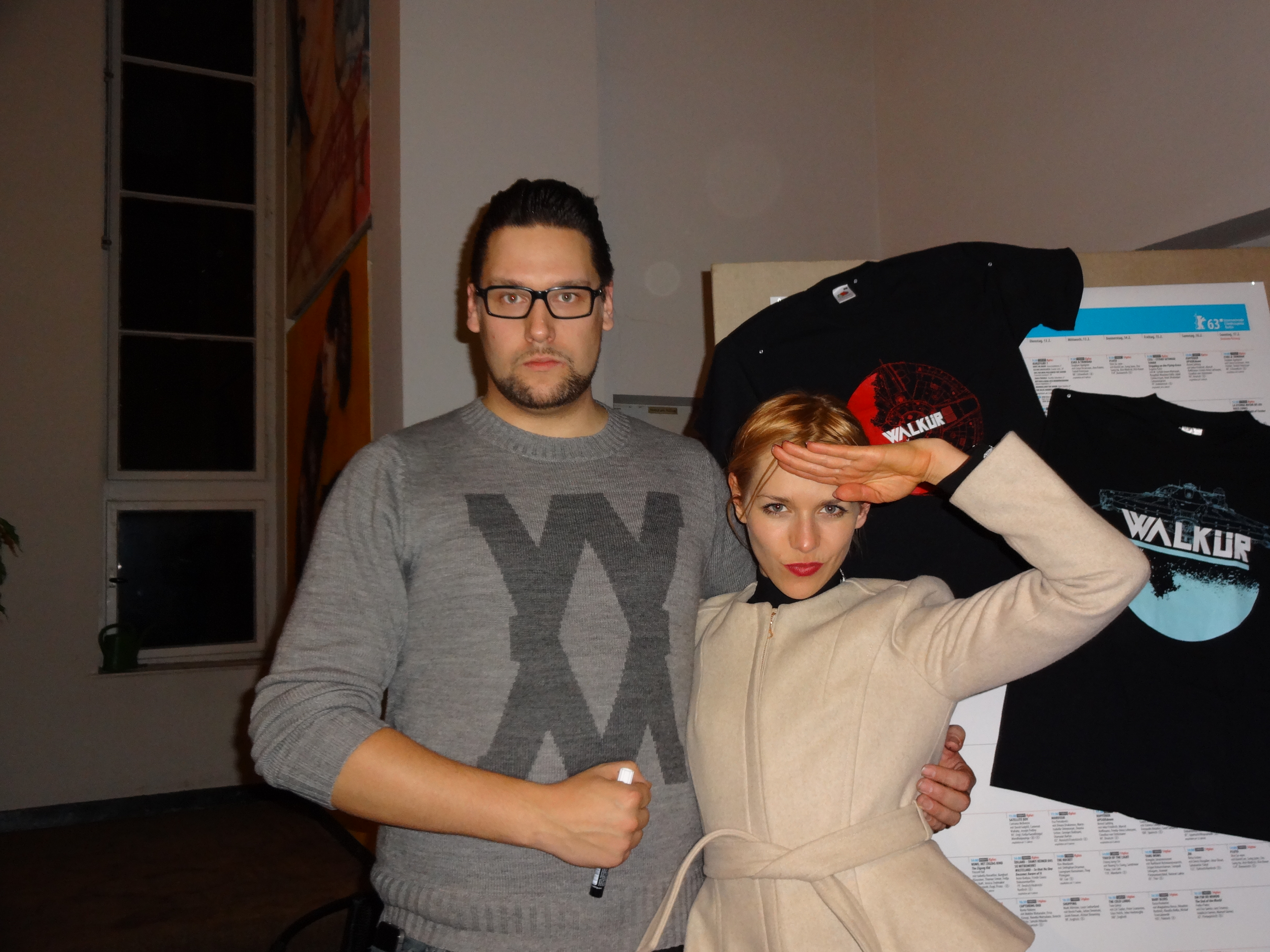
Vuorensola with Julia Dietze, the lead actress in Iron Sky, in 2013.

- 1996: Star Wreck IV: The Kilpailu – actor (voice role); direct-to-video
- 1997: Star Wreck V: Lost Contact – actor; direct-to-video
- 1998: Norwegian Whore – director, actor; direct-to-video
- 2005: Star Wreck: In the Pirkinning – director, actor; direct-to-video
- 2012: Iron Sky – director, actor (uncredited); direct-to-video
- 2019: Iron Sky: The Coming Race – director, actor; direct-to-video
- 2022: Jeepers Creepers: Reborn – director, actor
- 2023: 97 Minutes – director
- 2024: Altered – director

== Awards and nominations ==
- Iron Sky (2012)
  - 2012: Winner of the audience award Pegasus and the jury-prize Silver Méliès at the Brussels International Fantastic Film Festival
  - 2012: Nomination for the grand prize, The Golden Raven, at the Brussels International Fantastic Film Festival
  - 2012: Audience Award & Special Jury Mention at Utopiales Science Fiction Festival
