= Star Wreck: In the Pirkinning =

- DVD cover
- Directed by: Timo Vuorensola
- Written by: Samuli Torssonen; Rudi Airisto; Jarmo Puskala
- Produced by: Samuli Torssonen
- Starring: Samuli Torssonen; Atte Joutsen; Antti Satama; Janos Honkonen; Jari Ahola; Satu Heliö; Timo Pekurinen; Kari Väänänen
- Music by: Tapani Siirtola
- Distributed by: Energia Productions
- Release dates: August 20, 2005 (premiere); October 1, 2005 (Finland)
- Running time: 103 minutes
- Country: Finland
- Language: Finnish
- Budget: €13,462.33

Star Wreck: In the Pirkinning is a 2005 parody fan film produced by five friends in a two-room flat in Finland with a small budget and the support of a few hundred fans and several dozen acquaintances. It is the seventh production in the Star Wreck movie series, and the first of professional quality and feature length. It is a dark science fiction comedy about domination of the world and the universe, and a parody of the Star Trek and Babylon 5 franchises.

The original version ("net version") of the film is available as an authorized and legal download on the Internet under the Creative Commons CC BY-NC-ND license.

== Plot ==
The newly established P-Fleet travels to a remote region of space. They approach an anomaly, identified as a "maggot hole". On the bridge of the C.P.P. Potkustartti, Captain James B. Pirk (Samuli Torssonen) reminisces about his experiences since the end of the previous film, Star Wreck V: Lost Contact. Pirk was stranded on Earth at the end of the 20th century, his spaceship destroyed, his crew dispersed to avoid changing Earth's history.

Years later, Pirk realized that Earth's history had not developed as expected since first contact with the Vulgars. Instead of helping Mankind to conquer space, the Vulgars were corrupted by rock star Jeffrey Cochbrane, who sold their spaceship to the Russians. Pirk takes matters into his own hands, and with his old crew members Commander Dwarf (Timo Vuorensola) and Commander Info (Antti Satama), he locates the spaceship of the Vulgars. Gaining the trust of the Russian President, he builds the spaceship C.P.P. Potkustartti and subsequently the "P-Fleet". Due to his monopoly on superior technology, Pirk takes control of the Earth and becomes its emperor.

Pirk desires further conquest. He takes the fleet through the maggot hole to a parallel universe, in which history has taken a different path. Pirk announces his intent to conquer the parallel universe to Captain Johnny K. Sherrypie, the commander of the Babel 13 space station. Sherrypie resists and sends his fleet to counter Pirk's. Babel 13's fleet is devastated. Sherrypie surrenders to the P-Fleet's forces and lures Pirk and his security detail with promises of shore leave and sexual encounters with the Babel 13's female personnel.

Sherrypie and his crew later try to assassinate Pirk, but he and his men escape. Battle resumes with the arrival of the Excavator, commanded by Festerbester. In a bitter fight, the P-Fleet suffers considerable losses, and the Excavator inflicts heavy damage on the Potkustartti. Crippled, the Potkustartti is set on a collision course, and the bridge personnel evacuate to Fukov's ship, the C.P.P. Kalinka. The destructive force of the Potkustartti ramming the Excavator during a "twist core split" (a parody of Star Trek's "warp core breach") destroys both ships. The remaining five P-Fleet ships approach Babel 13, preparing to destroy it, but Sherrypie's security officer Mikhail Garybrandy (Jari Ahola) has primed the station's reactor to blow up. The blast destroys the other ships, but the Kalinka escapes through the maggot hole, spiraling out of control and crashing into what appears to be ice age Earth. Pirk, Info and Dwarf beam down to safety as the ship crashes. The ending mirrors Pirk's initial predicament: he is stranded without a ship during an uneventful time in history. Info suggests he go into power save mode and revive himself in the distant future to stop the fleet from entering the maggot hole. The scene shifts to Earth's orbit where a cloud of high tech debris exists, suggesting that they are trapped in a post-apocalyptic future, not the prehistoric past.

== Characters ==
Most of the major characters are parodies of characters from Star Trek or Babylon 5.

=== Members of the P-Fleet ===
- Captain/Emperor James B. Pirk, played by Samuli Torssonen. A character based on James T. Kirk and Jean-Luc Picard, his surname an amalgamation of the two, who amounts to a megalomaniac, egotistic and incompetent fool with incredible luck. He has an eye for tactics in ship-to-ship combat, but lacks any social abilities. The only reason he has ever advanced beyond Sub-Lieutenant are his tactical skills and his ability to keep discipline by bullying.
- Commander Info, played by Antti Satama. A parody of Data. He is an android and has a tendency to speak in overly long sentences full of technobabble, which others like Pirk don't really seem to understand. On 21st-century Earth, when he runs out of flesh-colored paint, he stops trying to disguise himself.
- Commander Dwarf, played by Timo Vuorensola. A parody of Worf. He is a psychotic Plingon alien who betrayed his people to join Pirk's crew. True to his Plingon warrior background, he never showers or bathes. Famous for saying "Plingon warriors do not take showers!", he is trigger-happy and eager for action even when it puts the objective at risk.
- Sergey Fukov, played by Janos Honkonen. A semi-independent character based on Pavel Chekov. He is the great-great-great-great-grandfather of the original Fukov in Star Wreck 1, 2, and 3. Before joining up with Pirk, he was a highly incompetent nuclear engineer at the Chernobyl nuclear plant. He is the only captain of the P-fleet to inflict more destruction on his own ship than on the enemy. As Emperor Pirk says, he is "a brain-dead piss-for-brains Soviet mutant".
- Lieutenant Swagger, played by Tiina Routamaa. She is a parody of every exploited female officer in the history of science fiction. Lieutenant Swagger is the beautiful but ice-cold helm officer aboard the Potkustartti. Her tough composure only lifts on seeing Pirk in peril. She hates her uniform.

=== Members of the Babel 13 forces ===
- Captain Johnny K. Sherrypie, played by Atte Joutsen. A parody of John Sheridan. He is the commanding officer of space station Babel 13 and likes making long-winded speeches and delaying decisions. Unlike Pirk, he acts very professionally.
- Commander Susannah Ivanovitsa, played by Satu Heliö. A parody of Susan Ivanova. She is the sarcastic Executive Officer of the Babel 13. Her daily duties consist of reporting parking violations and enduring Sherrypie's speeches. She bemoans the fact that her career seems to have stalled.
- Festerbester, played by Janos Honkonen. A parody of Alfred Bester. He is a Psy-Co officer with a habit of commandeering ships, and he is a good tactician, about as competent as Fukov is incompetent. He is played by the same actor who plays Fukov (just as Walter Koenig plays both Chekov and Bester).
- Security Chief Mikhail Garybrandy (Karigrandi), played by Jari Ahola. A parody of Michael Garibaldi, who also parodies Kari Grandi with some of his jokes and with the name. He is Babel 13's head of security, and tends to drink at the most inappropriate moments.

=== Other characters ===
- President Ulyanov, played by Kari Väänänen. His name is a reference to Vladimir Ilyich Ulyanov (Lenin). He is the president of Russia—an honest, well-mannered politician with the best of intentions. Unlike most of the cast, he is played by a professional actor who resorts to overacting to not stand out too much.
- Ambassador Flush. A parody of Kosh, he utters idle comments in cryptic ways and picks his nose when no one is looking.

== Production ==
The movie was produced by Torssonen, who also played the part of Pirk and was one of the writers. In the early 1990s he produced short animated humorous fan films inspired by Star Trek, under the collective title Star Wreck. During those early years, Torssonen recruited his friends to help him in these productions. Most notable of them was Rudi Airisto, who disliked Star Trek and helped to add parody to these films.

After four animated short films, Torssonen and his friends decided to produce a longer live-action piece. The first was 1997's Star Wreck V: Lost Contact, a straightforward parodistic retelling of Star Trek: First Contact with some original elements. All the non-location shots were produced using a bluescreen technique. This movie, like the preceding animations, was a small cult hit on the Finnish science fiction scene.

After Lost Contact, Torssonen and others intimately involved with its production decided to create a final, sixth episode. It was planned to be a 15-minute live-action special effects heavy film containing the basic plot elements of In the Pirkinning: Pirk acquiring a ship and then a fleet, a quick transport to a Babylon 5-like world, where the Trek-inspired P-fleet ships would have a huge battle with Babylon 5-inspired ships. Airisto was to direct, and the production started in the way Lost Contact was made: without proper planning, but learning as they went. After Airisto moved to the UK to study, Torssonen called Timo Vuorensola and appointed him as director.

The first years of production were a period of learning and recruiting. No footage shot during that time survived to the released film. In 2000 the production crew released an intermediate film, Star Wreck IV½: Weak Performance, a short live-action piece. For the next several years, little progress was visible to outside observers. It took altogether seven years from the first conception of the movie to its release. Most of that time was needed to render all the computer-generated imagery for the special effects and for the virtual sets for all non-location scenes. Each frame in a second took over ten hours to render.

For most of the production, the studio was a converted two-room apartment. One room featured the blue screen and most of the computers and other equipment involved in the shooting. The kitchen contained the render farm, and a closet was used for dubbing. A number of other locations were used, including a newly built college building and a cruise ship.

The film features three professional actors: Jari Ahola, Karoliina Blackburn and Kari Väänänen.

== Ships ==
The ships used in the picture are almost exact copies of ships from Star Trek and Babylon 5, but with parody names. The name of Pirk's ship, CPP Potkustart, means "kickstart" (in the literal sense, lacking the positive connotations of the English word) and is based on USS Enterprise-E. Fukov's ship is called CPP Kalinka and is based on USS Enterprise-A. Several other Starfleet ships are seen but not named. The Excalibur from Crusade becomes the Excavator. Babylon 5 Starfuries are renamed "Star Flurries". Earthforce's Omega class destroyers are referred to as "Amigo Class Destroyers", and bear names like Backgammon and Appalling (parodies of Agamemnon and Apollo from Babylon 5). Two of the Amigos are named after the Finnish military figures Carl Gustaf Mannerheim and Adolf Ehrnrooth, and one is named after a hero of Finnish mythology, Ilmarinen.

== Translation ==
Star Wreck: In the Pirkinning exploits many kinds of humour, from word play and short gags to character parodies and a black comedy story line. Much of the word-level humour is based on mistranslation. For example, the alien race Minbari from Babylon 5 becomes Minibar.

The Star Trek spoof material is mostly inherited from the earlier Star Wreck films, dating back to the first Star Wreck animation from the time when Torssonen and his friends were in their early teens. Consequently, some of the Star Trek spoofs have a distinctly teenage feel.

Most Star Trek and other science fiction terminology has corresponding terminology in Finnish, introduced through many translations of science fiction. Star Wreck takes these established translations and twists them: for example, a phaser is conventionally translated as vaiheinen ("that which has phases"), while the Star Wreck equivalent is tuikutin (literally, "a thing that can cause twinkling"). Similarly, warp is conventionally translated as poimu (tuck, especially of a garment), while Star Wreck uses kieroutuminen (twisting, crooking or becoming perverse). English subtitles try to apply similar ideas, such as twinkler for phaser, and twist for warp. Photon torpedoes have become light balls, and a wormhole is a maggot hole. Pirk himself has a poor understanding of several words, saying "resorts" instead of "resources" or "moray" instead of "morale", for example.

The character of Mikhail Garybrandy is also a spoof. The Finnish name of the character is Mihail Karigrandi, a reference to the fictional character Kari Grandi, whose adventures for the benefit of thirsty people (bringing them the Grandi-brand juice to drink) were depicted in a long-running series of Finnish TV commercials. The tagline of the commercials is paraphrased in the film roughly as "After all, I am the hero of all who are thirsty ... a legend in our time". The fact that the Garybrandy character likes his alcohol also plays on this idea.

As a spoof of both Star Trek: The Original Series and the Finnish language, the engineer of the Potkustart (credited in the English credits as "the Scottish engineer") speaks Finnish in a heavy Turku dialect. This parodies Montgomery Scott's speaking in Lowland Scots. Moreover, the corresponding English subtitles have been rendered into Lowland Scots.

== Reception ==
During the seven years of production, In the Pirkinning was occasionally mentioned in the Finnish media, including several stories in national television news and in major regional newspapers. Several favourable reviews have been published in Finnish media since the release.

Within a week of the movie's authorized Internet release, more than 300,000 copies of the movie were legally downloaded from the main distribution site, excluding the various mirror sites. Within two weeks, it was estimated that more than 1,500,000 copies had been downloaded in total, including the mirror sites. Within two months, the estimate stood at more than 2.9 million copies downloaded from the official site alone. The film's service provider, Magenta sites, reported over 2 petabytes of data transfers and estimated that total number of downloads, including all mirrors, would be 3.5–4 million.

On January 28, 2006, In the Pirkinning premiered in Finnish TV, broadcast by YLE TV2 followed by a February 4 rerun on YLE's digital channel, YLE Teema. Teema's broadcast included the earlier movies and a documentary.

== Imperial Edition ==
Star Wreck: In the Pirkinning: Imperial Edition was released on December 13, 2006. It is available on DVD only and is distributed by Universal Pictures Nordic. The original version remains available for download.

In the Imperial Edition, the only major change to the movie itself is that the special effects have been redone and ship models are entirely new. The two-DVD release also has a number of documentaries and a commentary track. The reasons for this release were the production crew's desire to use their own ship designs in the movie and to get additional funding for their next production, Iron Sky.

The Imperial Edition was released in North America in 2009 on a single DVD, but retaining all the features of the Finnish release. For the American release, the box title was shortened to Star Wreck and the box art shows Torssonen wearing a Starfleet uniform with normal Star Trek-style insignia.

== Wreckamovie ==
The experiences of the creators of Star Wreck: In the Pirkinning led them to develop Wreckamovie, a Web 2.0 service that serves all kinds of audiovisual productions, from short films and music videos to feature-length films. The concept is that anyone can build a community for a movie or audiovisual project and ask for assistance with identified production tasks.
