= Iron Sky =

2012 science-fiction comedy film

- International theatrical release poster
- Directed by: Timo Vuorensola
- Screenplay by: Michael Kalesniko; Timo Vuorensola
- Story by: Johanna Sinisalo
- Concept by: Jarmo Puskala
- Produced by: Mark Overett; Cathy Overett; Oliver Damian; Samuli Torssonen; Tero Kaukomaa
- Starring: Julia Dietze; Christopher Kirby; Götz Otto; Peta Sergeant; Stephanie Paul; Udo Kier
- Cinematography: Mika Orasmaa
- Edited by: Suresh Ayyar
- Music by: Laibach
- Production companies: Blind Spot Pictures; Energia Productions; 27 Films Production; New Holland Pictures
- Distributed by: Walt Disney Studios Motion Pictures (Finland); Polyband (Germany); Hoyts (Australia)
- Release dates: 11 February 2012 (Berlinale); 4 April 2012 (Finland); 5 April 2012 (Germany); 10 May 2012 (Australia)
- Running time: 93 minutes (theatrical cut); 111 minutes (Director's Cut)
- Countries: Finland; Germany; Australia
- Languages: English; German
- Budget: €7.5 million
- Box office: US$10.1 million

Iron Sky is a 2012 science fiction comedy action film directed by Timo Vuorensola, who co-wrote the screenplay with Michael Kalesniko from a story by Johanna Sinisalo, based on a concept by Jarmo Puskala. It tells the story of a group of German Nazis who, having been defeated in 1945, fled to the Moon, where they built a space fleet to return in 2018 and conquer Earth. The story also incorporates elements of political satire. Iron Sky is one of the most expensive Finnish films.

Iron Sky comes from the creators of Star Wreck: In the Pirkinning and was produced by Tero Kaukomaa of Blind Spot Pictures and Energia Productions, co-produced by New Holland Pictures and 27 Films, and co-financed by numerous individual supporters; Samuli Torssonen was responsible for the computer-generated imagery. It was theatrically released throughout Europe in April 2012. A director's cut of the film with 20 additional minutes was released on DVD and Blu-ray on 11 March 2014. The film received negative reviews, focusing on the film's execution and dated humor.

A video-game adaptation titled Iron Sky: Invasion was released in October 2012. A sequel, titled Iron Sky: The Coming Race, was crowdfunded through Indiegogo and released in January 2019, to a more hostile critical reception and a box office bomb, culminating in the bankruptcy of two production companies involved in the sequel's production: Blind Spot Pictures, and Iron Sky Universe.

== Plot ==
In 2018, an American crewed mission lands on the Moon. The lander carries two astronauts, one of them an African-American model, James Washington, specifically chosen to aid the U.S. President's re-election (various "Black to the Moon" posters are seen, extolling the new landing).

Upon landing on the far side of the Moon, they encounter the descendants of Nazis who escaped to the Moon. Washington is taken captive after the other astronaut is killed. Nazi mad scientist Doktor Richter examines Washington and obtains his smartphone, which he later recognizes as having more computing power than their 1940s-style computers, enabling its use as a control unit to complete their space battleship Götterdämmerung.

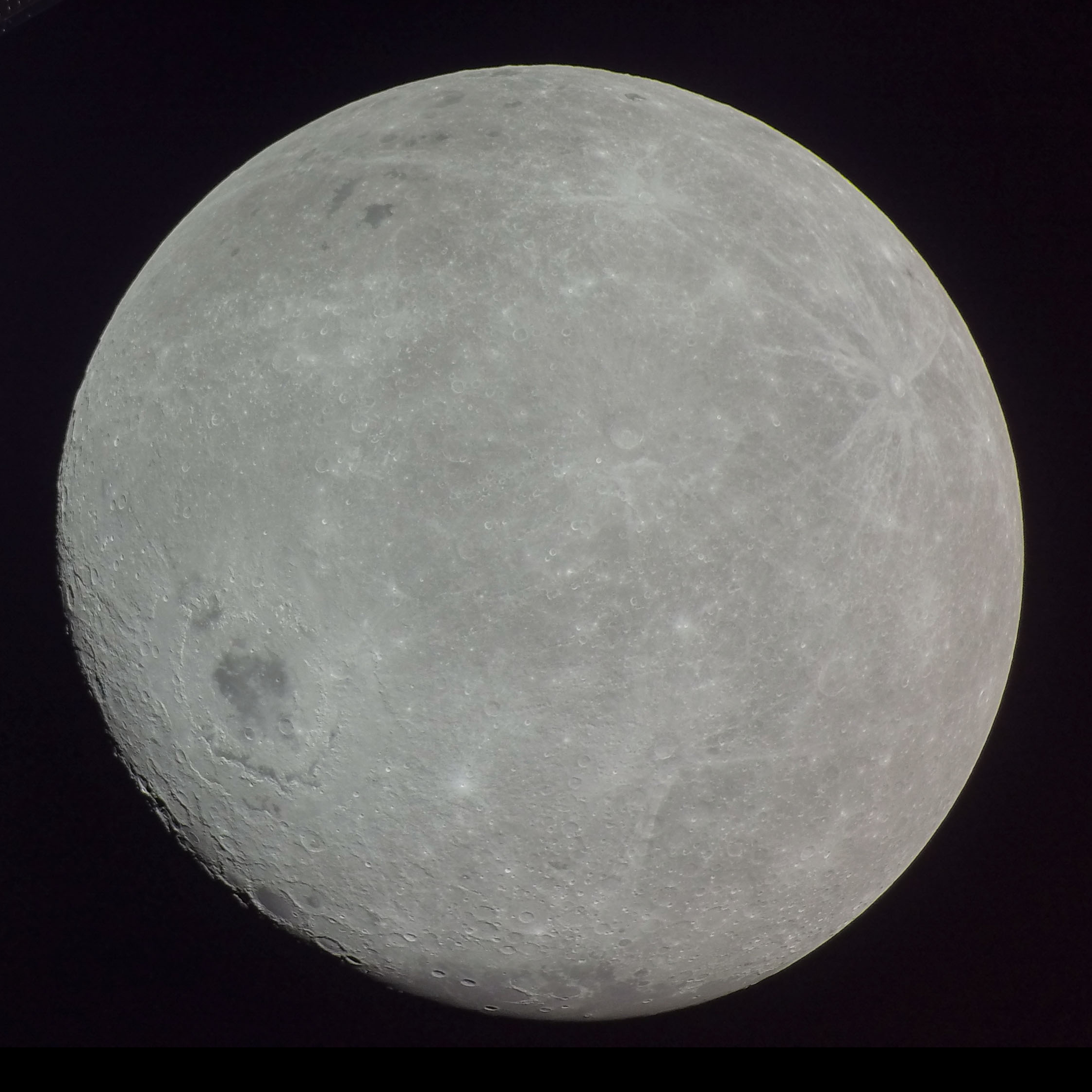
The Far Side of the Moon pictured in 2022

When Richter strives to demonstrate his Wunderwaffe to the current Führer, Wolfgang Kortzfleisch, the phone's battery is quickly exhausted. Nazi commander Klaus Adler, seeking to marry Richter's daughter Renate, an Earth specialist, embarks in a flying saucer to collect more such computers on Earth. He takes with him Washington, who has been "Aryanized" by Doktor Richter using an "albinizing" drug.

Upon landing in New York City, they discover that Renate has stowed away with them. They abandon Washington after he connects them with the President's campaign adviser, Vivian Wagner, who, in a parody of a scene from Downfall had raged at her staff for their inability to create effective marketing to improve the President's ratings. Adler and Renate energize the President's re-election campaign using Nazi-style rhetoric. Renate is unaware of Adler's ambition to rule the world.

Later, Kortzfleisch interprets Adler's lack of communication as treachery. He commands a much larger fleet of flying saucers and giant Zeppelin-like spacecraft called Siegfrieds which tow asteroids as missiles. Renate finds a now homeless Washington on the street, and together they watch The Great Dictator. From this, Renate realizes the Nazis' true intentions and that Adler intends global genocide.

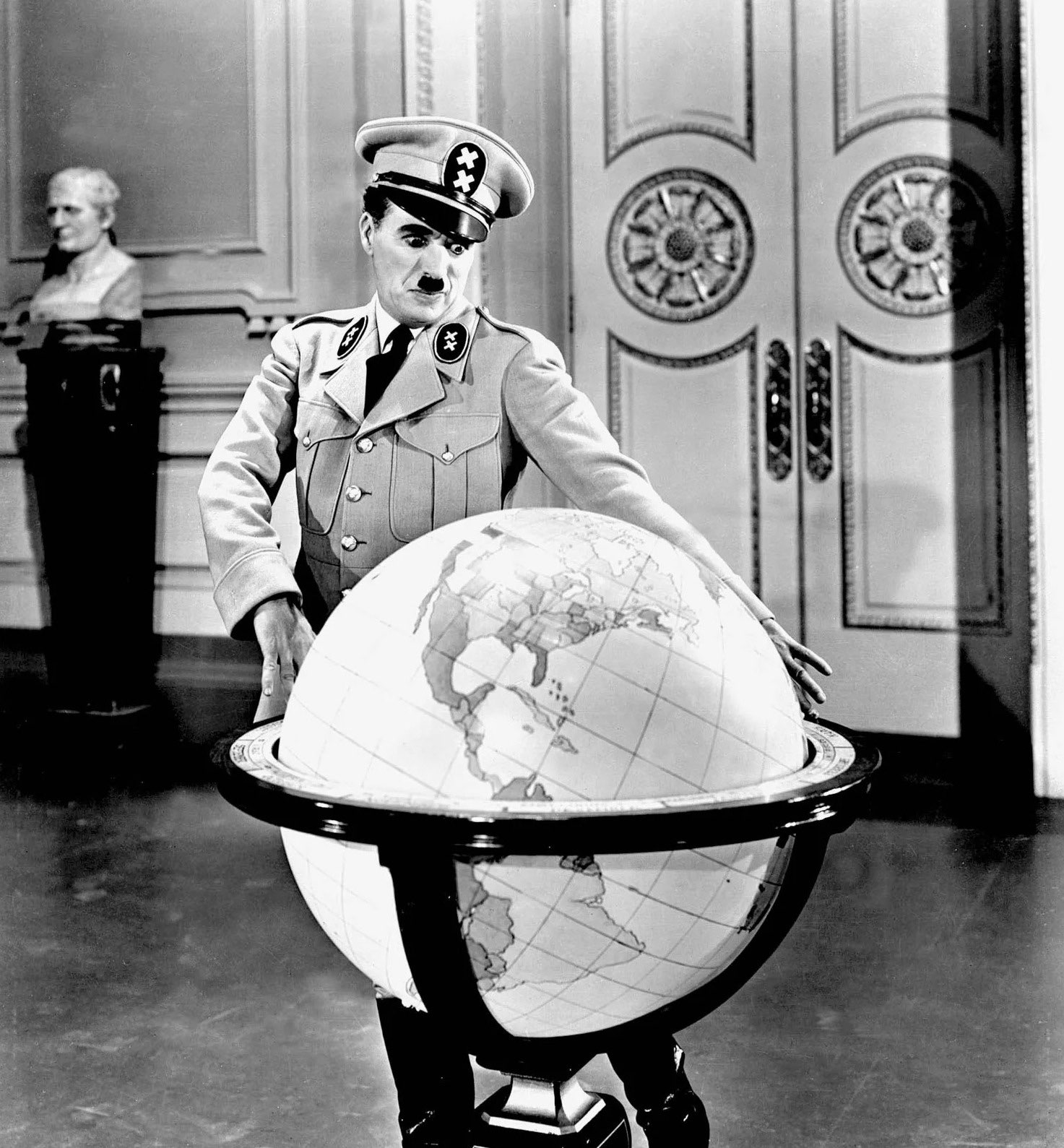
Footage from Charlie Chaplin's "The Great Dictator" is used and referenced throughout the film.

Kortzfleisch lands on Earth and confronts Adler, but is killed by Adler and Vivian, who were beginning an intimate relationship. Adler declares himself the new Führer before returning to orbit in Kortzfleisch's flying saucer, deserting Vivian but taking her iPad.

Afterwards, the Moon Nazis launch a blitzkrieg on New York City. The U.S. Air Force engage the flying saucers with some success.

The United Nations assembles to discuss the Moon Nazi threat. The President appoints Vivian as commander of the secretly militarised spacecraft USS George W. Bush, which carries nuclear and directed-energy weapons, in blatant violation of the Outer Space Treaty. Vivian intends to get revenge on Adler, but is quickly outgunned, only to discover that every other nation (except Finland) has also broken the treaty and secretly armed their spacecraft. They dispatch them against the Nazi fleet and wipe out the Siegfrieds.

Adler arrives in Kortzfleisch's flying saucer with the iPad to activate the Götterdämmerung. Renate and Washington travel in Adler's flying saucer, where Washington goes to disable the engines while Renate seeks out Adler. Meanwhile, the international space fleet damage the Nazis' Moon base and approach the Götterdämmerung which dwarfs them all. Commanding the Götterdämmerung, Adler destroys parts of the Moon to expose Earth to his line-of-fire. During the battle, Washington disconnects Vivian's iPad from the control panel of the Götterdämmerung, while Renate kills Adler before he can fire at Earth. Renate and Washington separately escape as the Götterdämmerung crashes into the Moon.

The U.S. president congratulates Vivian from the UN session; whereupon Vivian discloses the presence of large tanks of helium-3 on the Moon, of which the President immediately claims on grounds that it ensures a millennium-long supply of energy. This enrages the other UN members, one of whom throws his shoes at her, inciting a large brawl. Meanwhile, the international space fleet turns on each other and every ship is destroyed in the process.

At the damaged Moon base, Renate reunites with Washington, who has reverted his pigmentation back to normal. They kiss before a confused group of Nazi survivors. The final moments of the film show the Earth apparently during an international nuclear war. At the very end of the credits, the planet Mars is revealed with an artificial satellite in orbit.

== Cast ==
- Julia Dietze as Renate Richter
- Götz Otto as Klaus Adler
- Christopher Kirby as James Washington
- Tilo Prückner as Doktor Richter, a parody of Albert Einstein
- Udo Kier as Wolfgang Kortzfleisch
- Peta Sergeant as Vivian Wagner
- Stephanie Paul as the President of the United States (a parody of Sarah Palin)
- Michael Cullen as Secretary of Defense

== Production ==
Production began in early 2006, and the production team took their teaser trailer of the film to the 2008 Cannes Film Festival, seeking co-financiers. The team signed a co-production agreement with Oliver Damian's 27 Films Productions. Iron Sky is one of a new wave of productions, including Artemis Eternal, The Cosmonaut, A Swarm of Angels, and RiP!: A Remix Manifesto, produced in collaboration with an on-line community of film enthusiasts, creating participatory cinema. At Wreck-a-Movie, a collaborative film-making web site, the producers invited everyone interested to contribute ideas and resources to the project.

On 11 February 2009, it was announced that the film would star German actress Julia Dietze, while the Slovenian industrial music group Laibach would be recording the soundtrack. Appropriately enough for a film about Nazism, the orchestral soundtrack incorporates leitmotifs from the operatic cycle Der Ring des Nibelungen and other operas by Richard Wagner, a composer whose music was favoured by the Nazi leaders. The national anthem of the Nazis from the Moon ("Kameraden, wir kehren Heim!") has the tune of "Die Wacht am Rhein". During the 2010 Cannes Film Festival, Iron Sky signed a co-production agreement with the Australian production company New Holland Pictures, which brought Cathy Overett and Mark Overett as co-producers of the film.

Iron Sky was shot digitally with a Red camera. Cinematography began in November 2010 in Frankfurt for location shooting, and after that in January 2011 in Australia for studio shooting. Settings in Frankfurt were Weseler Werft (Weseler shipyard) and Taunusstrasse (English: Taunus Street). On 6 February 2011, the cinematography of Iron Sky concluded; it then entered a 10-week post-production process.

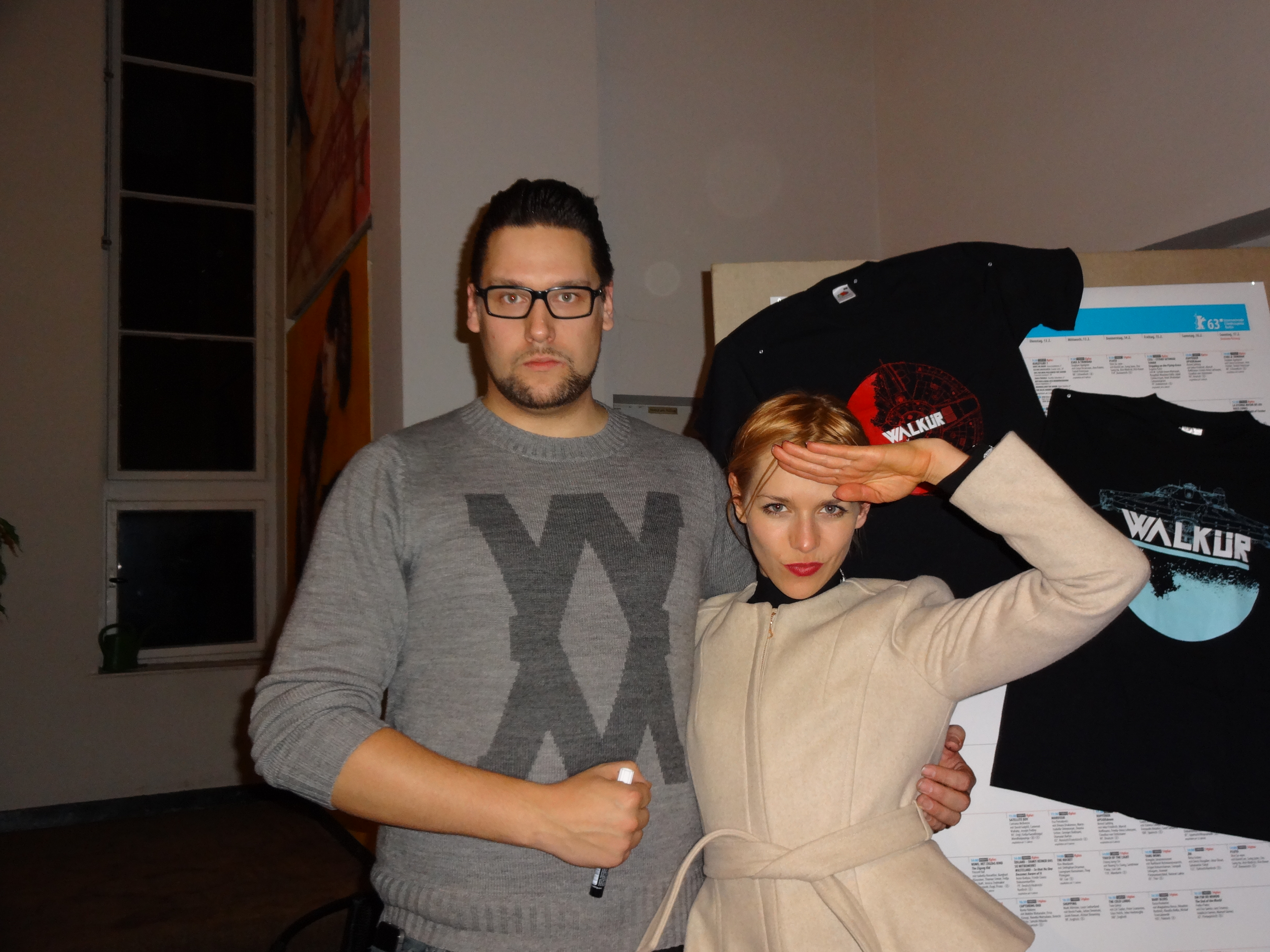
Director Timo Vuorensola and lead actress Julia Dietze pictured in 2013

== Release ==
Iron Sky premiered on 11 February 2012 at the 62nd Berlin International Film Festival, in the Panorama Special section. It was released in Finland on 4 April and in Germany on 5 April, running in major cinemas.

In the UK, there was some controversy regarding the decision of the distributor, Revolver Entertainment, to release the film for only one day, causing the film makers to issue a public condemnation of their UK distributor, and accusing Revolver of misleading them. Following high demand from the film's online fanbase, Revolver revised its decision and Iron Sky's UK cinema release was extended.

== Awards ==
- In 2013, Iron Sky won the Finnish audiovisual export Hulda award, granted by the Finnish Film & Audiovisual Export organization (Favex).

== Reception ==
Critical reception of Iron Sky in the United States was negative. On Rotten Tomatoes, the film has a 41% approval rating, based on 44 reviews, with an average rating of 4.5/10.

William Goss of Film.com gave the film a D+, saying that it "feels more and more like a lost Austin Powers sequel that already feels exceedingly dated in its humor." Jeff Shannon of The Seattle Times gave the film two out of four stars, describing it as "great idea, lousy execution". Leslie Felperin of Variety described Iron Sky as being "...neither good enough to rep a proper breakout hit nor bad enough that it might attain cult status; it's just kind of lame".

=== Accolades ===
The film won Best Visual Effects at the 2nd AACTA Awards.

== Spin-offs ==
=== Comic ===
On 5 October 2011, Blind Spot released a digital comic prequel to the film, titled Iron Sky: Bad Moon Rising, written by the writer of Alan Wake, Mikko Rautalahti, and fully illustrated by comic artist Gerry Kissell, creator of IDW Publishing's Code Word: Geronimo. IDW Publishing printed these comics in a softcover graphic novel collection in March 2013.

=== Video game ===
On 19 August 2012, TopWare Interactive announced Iron Sky: Invasion, an official video game adaptation and expansion of the film, to be developed by Reality Pump Studios. The game was described as an advanced space flight simulator game, with elements of the strategy and RPG genres.

=== Board game ===
In 2012, Revision Games published Iron Sky: The Board Game, a board game based on the film designed by Juha Salmijärvi. It is a strategy board game, where two opposing teams The Reich and The UWC struggle for domination over three continents of Earth. Each player is in charge of one continent and cooperation within each team is mandatory for success.

== Sequel ==
On 20 May 2012, Kaukomaa announced that there are plans for a prequel and a sequel but refused to disclose details. In May 2013, Vuorensola announced that Iron Sky will have a sequel titled Iron Sky: The Coming Race. He also mentioned that unlike the first film, this instalment will be completely funded by fans via Indiegogo, with an estimated budget of US$15 million. A promo video was to be shot for the 2014 Cannes Film Festival and the final draft of the script was scheduled to be published by the end of 2014. Filming was expected to begin in 2015. In July 2013, Vuorensola revealed Croatia as one of the proposed shooting locations. In February 2014, Dalan Musson signed in to write the screenplay. The Finnish Film Foundation and Medienboard Berlin-Brandenburg have come on board to finance the US$13 million project. Ultimately, this schedule was not maintained. In 2017, a January 2018 release date was announced. That date was missed, as was an August 2018 release. The movie was ultimately released in March 2019.

=== Bankruptcy ===
In the wake of the sequel's financing and production problems creating a years-long delay in completion and release, compounded by its copyright dispute, Blind Spot Pictures, the main production company for the Iron Sky franchise, declared bankruptcy on 17 September 2019. Iron Sky Universe, another production company involved in creating a would-be third film in the Iron Sky franchise, also filed for bankruptcy on 12 October 2020 by Ilmarinen Mutual Pension Insurance Company. This was confirmed by Timo Vuorensola, the Iron Sky franchise film director and Iron Sky Universe co-owner, saying: "The production company of Iron Sky, called Iron Sky Universe, one which I jointly set up with Tero, is going under."

== See also ==
- Colonization of the Moon
- Rocket Ship Galileo, Robert A. Heinlein's 1947 novel in which Nazis establish a secret base on the Moon.
- The Iron Dream, a similarly titled novel by Norman Spinrad also concerning Nazism.
- Nazis at the Center of the Earth, a mockbuster of Iron Sky by The Asylum.
