= Worknet =

A worknet is the term coined to describe a group of online participants and applications to collaborate a certain cause or purpose. It is an area that is concerned with the intersection of organizational behavior and computer science. The activity is called worknetting and was described in 2007 as a new trend for 2008 in the bulletin for marketeers and was further discussed and developed at the Web 2.0 Expo 2008 in San Francisco.

Worknetting is a new development and can be seen as the next step forward from social networking on the internet. Where social networking focuses on building online relations for participants, based on personal or organizational profiles and allowing them to communicate together, a worknet enables a network of people and organizations to collaborate and do business based on a common interest, such as in project collaboration, co-creating of products or policy, organizing events, administration, sharing experiences etc. This activity is called worknetting. The group of participants and the relevant applications together constitute a worknet.

Worknetting can be done between people in different organizations, but also within an organization. Heather M. Caruso et al. describes in "Boundaries Need Not Be Barriers: Leading Collaboration among Groups in Decentralized Organizations" that "no matter how a multi-divisional organization is designed, it needs to find effective ways to spontaneously and responsively coordinate information and activity across its resulting units". Worknets can also enable communication in and between communities of practice, which as described by E. L. Lesser et al. in "Communities of practice and organizational performance" delivers social capital: "By developing connections among practitioners who may or may not be colocated [...] communities of practice serve as generators for social capital".

The Worknet Institute aims to promote the practice of worknetting worldwide.

The concept of a worknet has evolved from the view that although many applications currently exist on the Internet as stand alone applications to do business and work together (such as Google Docs) most are scattered and thus create a "foggy workspace" for cross-organizational and interpersonal cooperation. And they are not linked to people or organizational profiles, thereby reducing the possible trust-level required to do business over the Internet. This is further complicated by the fact that many stakeholders operate in a number of closed networks (often called portals) at the same time which requires participants to have several profiles for every portal they participate in. A worknet enables networked group collaboration, a community relevant to the purpose and the tools relevant to that purpose combined in one space.

A big difference between social networks and a worknet is not only the type of collaboration applications which are offered to participants beyond mere networking and communication, it also is the approach: Worknetting does not take the participant as the point of departure, trying to enable the participants many purposes with applications, but it takes the common denominator between participants as the point of departure, drawing in different actors and applications to further that single cause.

An early basic online form of worknetting can be seen in worknets.com. The provision of the online worknet as a platform facilitating a collaborative group is evolving with new web technologies providing new ways to enable teams, communities and networks worldwide.

From an organizational behavior point of view, the trend is to see people empowered and large companies become networks, a phenomenon which has been called the network society. This has been popularized by Jan van Dijk in his book De Netwerkmaatschappij (1991). This is made possible in part by social computing which has become more widely known because of its relationship to a number of recent trends. These include the growing popularity of social software and Web 2.0, increased academic interest in social network analysis, the rise of open source as a viable method of production, and a growing conviction that all of this can have a profound impact on daily life. A February 13, 2006 paper by market research company Forrester Research suggested that:

Easy connections brought about by cheap devices, modular content, and shared computing resources are having a profound impact on our global economy and social structure. Individuals increasingly take cues from one another rather than from institutional sources like corporations, media outlets, religions, and political bodies. To thrive in an era of Social Computing, companies must abandon top-down management and communication tactics, weave communities into their products and services, use employees and partners as marketers, and become part of a living fabric of brand loyalists.

Collaboration between companies has shown to be a key driver of business performance. "As a general rule, global companies that collaborate better, perform better. Those that collaborate less, do not perform as well. It’s just that simple." Collaboration between companies will be between the professionals employed by those companies. Worknets enable setting up and maintaining the inter-company relationships.
