= Iron Sky: Invasion =

2012 video game

- Developer: Reality Pump
- Publisher: TopWare Interactive
- Designer: Mirosław Dymek
- Engine: GRACE2
- Platforms: Android; Mac OS X Microsoft Windows; PlayStation 3 Xbox 360
- Release: WW: December 12, 2012
- Genre: Space simulation
- Mode: Single-player

Iron Sky: Invasion is an official video game based on the 2012 Finnish science fiction comedy Iron Sky. The game is developed by Reality Pump Studios, and is published by TopWare Interactive.

Iron Sky: Invasion is a space fighter simulator, enhanced with strategic and RPG elements, set in the universe of Iron Sky and expanding upon its foundations. The core of the gameplay is based on ship-to-ship dogfights, combined with assaults on giant spaceships (such as the space Zeppelins, portrayed in the film), as well as tactical thinking and resource management.

The game was first announced on August 19, 2012, by the video game publisher TopWare Interactive, during the Gamescom trade fair in Cologne, Germany. It was released in Europe on December 12, 2012, for the Windows, Xbox 360, PlayStation 3, iOS, Android, and Mac OS platforms. It has received mixed to negative reviews from critics.

== Plot ==
In an alternate history, the Nazis not only managed to develop flying saucers ("Reichsflugscheiben"), but also built a secret hidden base in antarctica ("Neuschwabenland"), from where they launched a secret space program. After their defeat in world war II in 1945, they evacuated the antarctica base and built a new base on the dark side of the moon, and began a "Fourth Reich", with a massive fleet to return to earth and restart world war II - this time with a Nazi victory.

You are a veteran, American pilot and receive orders, to engage in a story, that soon will escalate in the greatest space war in the history in mankind until now...

Iron Sky: Invasion is one single real-time mission. Your main task is to stop Nazi forces invading earth. Invading Nazi forces or - worse - asteroids impact on earth give you a negative reputation. Engaging Nazi forces gives you not only a positive reputation but also contain salvage parts with that you can upgrade your ship what makes it much easier to fulfill the main and side missions of the game.

In the prologue of the game, an unnamed captain (the player) has joined up with the United States Space Force and learns how to fly his ship with the help of Jason Bailey, who the captain knows from his past. Once he learns how to fly, Jason will set up drones to attack the Captain. After the captain destroys all of them, his training is completed.

In Chapter 1: Iron Sky, Jason receives orders that the Nazi ambassadors want to initiate a peace talk. The captain then receives a communication from Renata Richter, who instructs him to contact the Nazi fleets Admiral, Obbergroupenfuher Wilhelm Krutz. After the captain makes his way to the first zeppelin, Bliterof, he contacts Krutz and relays Renatta's message to not engage. However, Krutz does not cooperate and instead gives an order for fighters to attack and states that the Nazis are at war. The captain escapes and receives instructions from Jason that the Nazis were attacking a Korean base. Once the captain deals with the attackers, Jason will inform him that the Koreans were giving him one of their fighters as a reward for defending the base (If the player chooses to).

Once the player begins engaging the German fighters approaching earth, the Indian ambassador, Mr. Sharma, contacts the captain and requests him to assist him with a few tasks including protecting a satellite, and recover a captured director form the Germans. After protecting the satellite, the captain returns to the ISS, where Jason informs him that command has instructed him to give the Captain orders from then on out, and that they wanted the first zeppelin destroyed. The captain manages to destroy the first zeppelin and contacts Krutz, where he taunts the captain for destroying the zeppelin, and warns him that the war was far from over.

The US president then congratulates the captain for his heroic actions. Once more of the invasion fleet is disabled, the captain heads to the Korean Space Station, where the Russian ambassador, Vladimir Zhiryanov, asks the captain for his assistance in capturing 4 spy satellites that were used by the Soviet Union during the Cold War, suggesting that a Russian scientist could infect the satellites with a virus. The Captain, although hesitant to be working with the Russians, protects the first satellite, with Zhiryanov suggesting him to not worry about the other satellites. The captain then engaged the remaining Nazi ships, with the Germans deploying Brünnhilde transport ships carrying asteroids.

In Chapter 2, Jason instructs the Captain to destroy 2 more Zeppelins Heinrich and Herman being escorted by Brünnhildes. After destroying them, the Germans launch another counterattack consisting of hundreds of Walkyr, Reigngold, and Alberich fighters, more Brünnhilde transport ships, and new Wotan transport Reichsflugscheibes. After dealing with the counterattack, Mr. Sharma contacts the Captain and instructs him with defending an Indian satellite. After doing so the US president orders the Captain to gather salvage parts. Then Mr. Shama instructs you to rescue a captured Indian film director, which the captain managed to save, and assist the films crew.

The Russian Ambassador, Zhiryanov, also orders the Captain to destroy more satellites. After returning to the ISS, Jason informs the Captain that Renete Richter was heading back to the moon after finishing her negotiations. Renete contacts the Captain and instructs him to provide her cover while she flees to the Moon. While providing her cover, Renete also instructed the Captain to defend a navigation satellite, destroy a Brünnhilde blocking her route to the Moon, defend another satellite for her to broadcast a message to the civilians on the moon, and capture a Reigngold to act a diversion. The Captain is ultimately successful, with Renete safety getting to the Moon unharmed.

The Germans then launch another counterattack, and the US president and Mr. Shama give additional objections to the Captain including destroying 2 Japanese Banzai's, being piloted by Russians, and a Nazi satellite and protect an Indian film crew from attack. Once the film crew was safe, the captain engaged the remaining German Reichsflugscheibes and returned to the ISS to await his next objective.

In chapter 3, the Nazis launch astroids to continue the Meteor Blitzkrieg and the captain changes his fighter to the heavy bomber Canadarm for his next assignment and destroys three of the asteroids, escorted by fighters, with nuclear bombs, with the Katar assisting him. After dealing with the astroids, the Captain returned to the ISS with the Canadarm and switched to the Zerg, now equipped with the cluster missiles from the Canadarm. The Germans attempt another invasion of the Earth, armed with 4 fleets, But they are quickly brought down.

== Gameplay ==
The game takes place in outer space, where the players must defend the Earth from the invasion of the Moon Nazis, as depicted in the 2012 film. The players can control most of the spaceships from the movie, to freely roam the space and attack Nazi vessels. There are weapons and equipment at their disposal, from offensive systems to defensive drones and satellites.

The vessels are also equipped with military countermeasures which protect them from enemy fire, and can be recharged, upgraded, or traded for other models. Upgrades require special resources, which can be scavenged from destroyed enemy units or found in outer space. A tactical space map can be used to spot the positions of Nazi forces or ongoing battles, with the destruction of the secret Nazi base and superweapon hidden on the Dark Side of the Moon set as the ultimate goal.

== See also ==
- Nazi UFOs
