= Star Wreck =

Film series

Star Wreck is a series of Finnish Star Trek parody movies started by Samuli Torssonen in 1992. The first movie, simply named Star Wreck, was a simple Star Control-like animation with three ships shooting at each other, but later movies featured CGI-animated characters and, in the latest films, live actors. Often Star Wreck is used to refer to the latest and most popular film Star Wreck: In the Pirkinning.

Star Wreck relates the adventures of James B. Pirk (named after the Star Trek character James T. Kirk), Captain of the starship C.P.P. Potkustartti (English C.P.P. Kickstart). Other characters include Mr. Fukov, Mr. Spook (Finnish: Mr. Spökö), Mr. Dwarf (Wuf), Ensign Shitty and Mr. Info (loosely based, respectively, on Star Trek's Pavel Chekov, Mr. Spock, Worf, Scotty, and Data). The characters speak Finnish; subtitles in various languages, including Klingon, are available.

In 2015, it was announced that two new films were going to be released. The first one will be a short film titled "Star Wreck: Timecrash", set in future Soviet Union, and the second, currently untitled one will be a feature-length film.

== Films ==
All Star Wreck films are available online under a Creative Commons CC BY-NC-ND licence.

- Star Wreck (1992)
- Star Wreck II: The Old Shit (1994)
- Star Wreck III: The Wrath of the Romuclans (1995)
- Star Wreck IV: The Kilpailu (1996)
- Star Wreck V: Lost Contact (1997)
- Star Wreck 4.5: Weak Performance (2000; takes place between IV and V)
- Star Wreck: In the Pirkinning (2005)
- Star Wreck 2π: Full Twist, now! (2012)

The first five Star Wreck films were re-released on Star Wreck: Legacy DVD in 2006, with original score replacing the Star Trek score, and other changes. Star Wreck: In the Pirkinning was re-released on an Imperial Edition DVD in 2006, with updated models and effects.

== Popularity ==
Star Wreck has enjoyed a relatively large niche following among sci-fi fans, but it was only the 2005 movie that really pushed it into the limelight. Star Wreck: In the Pirkinning was downloaded over 700,000 times during the first week after its release and the current estimates by the hosting service, Magenta sites, are between 3.5 and 4 million downloads, including mirror sites. This has been claimed to make In the Pirkinning the most popular Finnish film of all time, topping the movie theatre viewings for The Unknown Soldier (approx. 2.8 million viewers); the comparison, however, may not be particularly meaningful. Numerous TV and magazine interviews of the film's authors have been published, both in Finland and abroad.

Star Wreck RPG

Star Wreck: In the Pirkinning has also been shown on Finnish national television, YLE TV2, on the Belgian national television channel Canvas, and Italian TV-channel Jimmy.

A new Imperial Edition DVD has also been released by Universal Pictures in Scandinavia. With the Imperial Edition release, all the space scenes with Star Trek or Babylon 5 ship models were removed and completely remade.

In September 2007, a 1-DVD version of Star Wreck: In the Pirkinning – Imperial Edition was released also in Japan by AMG & Medallion Media. The version includes a professional dub for Japanese, as well as new sleeve design and a poster/cue card inside the DVD case.

In 2012, a spin-off called Star Wreck 2π: Full Twist, now! was released. It is made by Swiss film makers, but Samuli Torssonen and Timo Vuorensola have a guest appearance in their respective roles.

There is also a spin-off animated Star Wreck, created by a different author who has no relation to Torssonen's team, called Star Wreck Asskicker which tells the story of the C.P.P. Asskicker.

== Role-playing game ==
The Star Wreck Roleplaying Game is an English-language role-playing game (RPG) published in Finland by Energia Productions that is set in the Star Wreck universe. It was first released at Ropecon in 2006. The game is a parody of the numerous Star Trek roleplaying games, but is also playable on its own. Its rule mechanics are built to emulate the setting of the films, with experienced characters becoming more heroically incompetent instead of getting better at their tasks, as is the case in most mainstream games.

In August 2007 the game was licensed under a Creative Commons Attribution-Noncommercial-ShareAlike license and made available for free download.

== See also ==
- Iron Sky
