= Mariangela Pino =

American actress (born 1953)

- Born: August 15, 1953 (age 72); Chama, New Mexico, U.S.
- Education: Temple University (BA); University of California, San Diego (MFA)
- Occupation: Actress
- Years active: 1987–1999

Mariangela Pino is an American actress. She is best known for her role as Diane Koscinski in the 1994 film Richie Rich and her recurring role as Marie Morton on the sitcom Home Improvement.

== Early life and education ==
Pino was born in Chama, New Mexico. She earned a Bachelor of Arts in communications from Temple University and a Master of Fine Arts in performance art from the University of California, San Diego.

== Career ==
In 1986, Pino appeared in the Off-Broadway play Orchards. Other television credits include Wiseguy, Who's the Boss?, L.A. Law, Murder One, Chicago Hope, ER, NYPD Blue and The Pretender.

In April 1996, Pino had a bit part in a made-for-TV movie, Unforgivable, co-starring with John Ritter and Harley Jane Kozak. Pino also appeared in the films Op Center (1995), The Souler Opposite and Living Out Loud, both released in 1998.

Her last acting credit was a guest appearance on Touched by an Angel in 1999. She currently runs "The Center for True North" with her husband Hank Landau in Springdale, Utah.

== Filmography ==
=== Film ===
Year	Title	Role	Notes
1994	Richie Rich	Diane	
1996	Two Guys Talkin' About Girls	Edith	
1998	Living Out Loud	Donna	
1998	The Souler Opposite	Rita	

=== Television ===
Year	Title	Role	Notes
1987	A Year in the Life	Viola	Episode: "Dixie Chicken"
1989	Who's the Boss?	Polly	Episode: "Supermom Burnout"
1991	Equal Justice	Lorene Bassler	3 episodes
1991	N.Y.P.D. Mounted	Madeline Spampatta	Television film
1991	CBS Schoolbreak Special	Linda Manning	Episode: "Dedicated to the One I Love"
1991	My Son Johnny	Rhoda Cortino	Television film
1991	Civil Wars	Jackie Vaughn	Episode: "The Pound and the Fury"
1992	A Thousand Heroes	Marcia Poole	Television film
1993	Life Goes On	Clinic Doctor	Episode: "Incident on Main"
1993	Born Too Soon	Leslie	Television film
1993	Love & War	Nurse Rita	Episode: "I Got Plenty of Nothing"
1993, 1994	L.A. Law	Hortense Krieger	2 episodes
1993–1995	Home Improvement	Marie Morton	8 episodes
1994	Couples	Ellie	Television film
1995	Tom Clancy's Op Center	Martha Macken	Miniseries
1995	Trial by Fire	Evie Bauchmoyer	Television film
1995	Step by Step	Debbie Crawford	Episode: "The Fight Before Christmas"
1996	Hudson Street	Beth	Episode: "Dear Cyberspace"
1996	Murder One	Det. Gretchen Jankow	2 episodes
1996	Chicago Hope	Mrs. Dipretto	2 episodes
1996	Unforgivable	Helen Jessup, M.D.	Television film
1996	ER	Ms. Dellanova	Episode: "Fevers of Unknown Origin"
1996	The Pretender	Annie	Episode: "The Paper Clock"
1996	Mr. Rhodes	Barb	Episode: "Looking for Mrs. Goodbar"
1996	NYPD Blue	Sheila Kinnan	Episode: "Yes Sir, That's My Baby"
1997	Promised Land	Barbara Manning	Episode: "Running Scared"
1998	Michael Hayes	Stephanie Schuler	Episode: "Mob Mentality"
1998	Brooklyn South	Julliane Brooks	Episode: "Doggonit"
1998	Millennium	Teresa Roe	Episode: "A Room with No View"
1999	Touched by an Angel	Faye Burton	Episode: "Anatomy Lesson"
