= Graeme Campbell (director) =

Canadian film maker

- Occupation(s): film director, film editor and writer
- Years active: 1988–present

Graeme Neil Campbell is a Canadian film director, writer and editor.

== Life and career ==
He has made films for television, including individual episodes and mini-series, including crime drama television series Murder One, released by Miramax in 1988. The film was being directed by screenwriter Fleming 'Tex' Fuller, however after one week of principal photography Fuller was fired and replaced by Campbell. Starring Henry Thomas, the film portrays a horrific crime spree gone wrong.

This was followed by a true crime series Deadly Betrayal: The Bruce Curtis Story for NBC, about the poisonous friendship between two teens. Campbell's other films include Unforgivable starring John Ritter.

== Filmography ==
Campbell's films include:

- The Best Years (2 episodes, 2009)
- Degrassi: The Next Generation (4 episodes, 2005–2008)
- An Old Fashioned Thanksgiving (2008) (TV)
- Instant Star (14 episodes, 2005–2008)
- Everest (2007) TV mini-series
- Going for Broke (2003) (TV)
- The Eleventh Hour (2002) TV series (1 episode, 2003)
- Strange Days at Blake Holsey High (2002) TV series (2 episodes, 2003)
- Guilt by Association (2002) (TV)
- Mutant X (2 episodes, 2001)
- Dangerous Child (2001) (TV)
- Out of Sync (2000) (TV) ... aka Lip Service (Australia) (USA: DVD title)
- G-Saviour (1999) (TV)
- At the Mercy of a Stranger (1999) (TV)
- Twice in a Lifetime (1999) TV series (3 episodes, 1999)
- Dooley Gardens (1999) TV series (1 episode, 1999)
- Dream House (1998) (TV)
- Nico the Unicorn (1998)
- Volcano: Fire on the Mountain (1997) (TV)
- Country Justice (1997) (TV)
- Talk to Me (1996) (TV)
- Unforgivable (1996) (TV)
- The Outer Limits (1 episode, 1995)
- Deadlocked: Escape from Zone 14 (1995) (TV)
- The Man in the Attic (1995) (TV)
- Kung Fu: The Legend Continues (3 episodes, 1993–1994)
- The Disappearance of Vonnie (1994) (TV)
- Road to Avonlea (1 episode, 1993)
- Ready or Not (4 episodes, 1993)
- North of 60 (1 episode, 1992)
- The Odyssey (1 episode, 1992)
- The Ray Bradbury Theater (1 episode, 1992)
- Deadly Betrayal: The Bruce Curtis Story (Canadian title: Journey into Darkness) (1991) (TV)
- Street Justice (1991) TV series (1 episode, 1991)
- Into the Fire (1988)
- Murder One (1988)
- Blood Relations (1988)
- Still Life (1988)
