= Born Into Exile =

1997 American television film

- Written by: Kathleen Rowell; Danielle Hill
- Directed by: Eric Laneuville
- Starring: Mark-Paul Gosselaar; Gina Philips; Talia Shire
- Music by: Dana Kaproff
- Country of origin: United States
- Original language: English

Production
- Producers: Dennis Murphy; Betsy Schechter
- Cinematography: Steven Shaw
- Editor: Stephen Lovejoy
- Running time: 105 minutes

Original release
- Network: NBC
- Release: March 17, 1997

Born Into Exile is a 1997 television film directed by Eric Laneuville. It featured Seann William Scott in his film debut.

== Plot ==
Holly Nolan is a 14-year-old, dealing with the typical issues of someone her age, including peer pressure. Always wanting to hang out with the older crowd, she meets and falls in love with Chris, a 19-year-old guy who was rejected by his family. He is now hoping to attend college and go into forestry once he is out of the military reserve force. When her recently divorced and overly protective mother, Donna, finds out about their relationship, she is outraged, forbidding her from ever seeing him again. Holly, upset that her mother doesn't want to give him a chance because of his age, responds furiously when she kicks him out of her yard. She sneaks out and decides to run away with him to start a new life in California.

They soon find out that traveling without money is difficult. This fact only is emphasized further when they encounter a lecherous trucker and a change of routes. They break the law by stealing to survive. Once in Southern California, they soon find out they have nowhere to go. They pass up an offer from the church, but discover they can't count on support from their families either. Chris is wanted because of his desertion, and Donna files a missing persons report with the police to find her daughter, threatening to sue Chris for statutory rape. Thinking she is in love with him, Holly decides to ignore her mother and stay with Chris. However, this proves to be exhausting. Holly is arrested for suspicion prostitution and Chris eventually turns to male prostitution on the streets of Los Angeles to earn money for food.

== Cast ==
- Mark-Paul Gosselaar as Chris
- Gina Philips as Holly Nolan
- Talia Shire as Donna Nolan
- Eddie Mills as Ted Nolan
- Seann William Scott as Derek
- Heather Gottlieb as Rosie
- Mark Pellegrino as Walter
- Ever Carradine as Hooker

== Production and reception ==
The story was written to confront people about the then huge amount of teenage runaways. It was initially to be an ABC Afterschool Special and received support from music bands, claiming it could have positive influence. The project was then shelved, until it was picked up a year later as an NBC made-for-television film.

The film received generally positive reviews. Variety was exceptionally positive about the film, praising the story, the characters, the cinematography and Talia Shire's acting performance. The New York Times was less praiseful, criticizing the way the story was told, stating it was not sordidly. However, the newspaper praised the director and musical score.
