= Scavengers (game show) =

- Genre: Game show
- Created by: Julian Grant
- Presented by: John Leslie
- Starring: Anna Galvin (Android)
- Voices of: David McCallum
- Country of origin: United Kingdom
- Original language: English
- No. of series: 1
- No. of episodes: 13

Production
- Running time: 60 minutes (inc. adverts)
- Production companies: Carlton and Julian Grant Television Productions in association with 20th Century Fox Film Corporation

Original release
- Network: ITV
- Release: 23 July 1994 – 21 August 1995

Scavengers was a British game show that aired on ITV from 23 July 1994 to 21 August 1995, hosted by John Leslie.

The show was filmed on a specially-constructed £2.5 million set at Pinewood Studios, where other versions of the show were also recorded. The show was originally broadcast on Saturday teatimes in July 1994, but remaining episodes were burned off in a Monday morning slot the following year.

== Plot summary ==
Olga Ojeda Andres as the ship's android in the Spanish version of the series.

The Commander of the shuttle-craft Vulture (John Leslie) leads two teams of Scavengers to the stricken cargo ship Cyclops in an attempt to retrieve salvage. Each team of Scavengers is formed from one man and one woman. One team competes in yellow the other in red and the salvage they are attempting to recover is usually marked with their team colours. The Commander and The Scavengers are joined by a female android, played by actress Anna Galvin, who provides directions and tactical information to the team once the game has begun.

== Game mechanics ==
Once the teams set foot on Cyclops they have just 51 minutes to explore the ship via a pre-determined route and return to Vulture; any scavenger who fails to return on time is left behind and their team's score is null and void. Along the way the teams face a series of six physical and mental tasks in an attempt collect salvage from Cyclops; each item of salvage having a salvage points value referred to frequently as SPs. SPs for an individual item of salvage range from 1 to 50, and there are typically 100 SP available between the two teams for an individual challenge. Each individual challenge must be completed within a strict time limit otherwise all salvage collected is rendered useless and has no sp value.

== Challenges ==
While on board Cyclops the teams would complete six challenges. All teams competed in Crusher and all heats ended with The Final Abyss the remaining four events varied from week to week.

The Android would introduce each challenge by stating its aim, value and special difficulties. The Commander would often embellish these instructions and seemingly impose his own rules such as making certain events a race or setting a minimum amount of salvage to be collected.

=== Crusher ===
- Aim: Recovery of 10 Fuel Rods from Cyclops waste crusher.
- Value: Each fuel rod is worth 10 Salvage Points.
- Special Difficulties: Crusher activated by Scavenger interference.
- Time Limit: 4.00 Minutes
- Details:

In this test the four scavengers entered the waste crusher inside which was a large amount of debris typically to waist height, and a full complement of ten fuel rods. Scavengers had four minutes to retrieve these before the crusher completed its cycle and killed them.

While it is unlikely that anyone would have actually been left to die in the crusher the moving wall and spinning blades certainly unsettled the scavengers often causing them to leave without collecting all of the fuel rods.

If a team found more than five of the fuel rods they would still only score a maximum of 50sp, however the other team would still be unable to score the maximum score of 50sp a result.

In the finals the fuel rods were larger and came in two pieces, only fully reconstructed fuel rods were counted towards their score.

=== Bomb Disposal Chamber ===
- Aim: Recovery of four detonators from Cyclops' armoury.
- Value: Each detonator is worth 25 Salvage Points.
- Special Difficulties: Bombs must be disarmed and deactivated before salvage is recoverable.
- Time Limit: No Time Limit
- Details

Each team has two attempts to recover a single detonator by trying to lift the plate up from the top of a missile. The plate is held by three tall pins, the centre one being tallest and if the plate touches any of the pins the bomb will activate. The scavengers must, therefore carefully remove the plate and collect the detonator.

The Commander shows the team a 'dud' detonator that explodes loudly when he throws it out of range. This came as a surprise to the teams and no doubt made the test more difficult. Whenever a team activate a bomb the Commander will quickly remove the detonator and throw it out of range.

There are no restrictions on how the plate is removed; one team used straps on their uniform to prevent the plate touching the pins.

=== Solar Tower ===
- Aim: Recovery of solar cells from base of deep chamber.
- Value: Each cell is worth 10 Salvage Points.
- Special Difficulties: Scavengers must navigate incomplete pulley system.
- Time Limit

Event is a race between the two teams.
Only the winning team will score.
Scavengers must collect at least two solar cells to complete the race.

- Details

The Scavengers begin at the top of a tall tower with the cells illuminating the base. The female Scavengers must abseil down to the bottom of a chain about halfway down the tower and attach her safety harness to the chain. The male Scavengers can then winch the female scavengers down to the base then they flip upside down to grab the cells and place them in net bags.

The male Scavengers must then winch them all the way up the top of the tower where they can scramble over the railings and back onto the gantry.

The first female Scavenger with both 'feet on the deck' earns the Sp's for the cells collected; the other team earns nothing.

=== Airlock ===
- Aim: Recovery of two transformers from the Airlock.
- Value: Each transformer is worth 50 Salvage Points.
- Special Difficulties: Airlock code needed to open doors.
- Time Limit

Event is a race between the two teams.
Only the winning team will score.

- Details

As the teams pass through the airlock the doors begin to close at either end. The Commander instructs the female Scavengers to run through the doors leaving himself and the male Scavengers trapped.

Commander: Android, we're in Airlock and the doors are closing.
Android: Scavengers now trapped, oxygen decreasing.
Commander: Oxygen decreasing! Android, why didn't you tell us?
Android: Because Scavengers would not have gone in.

The male Scavengers must wire up a battery to their door before describing a series of six symbols to their partners. If the female Scavengers input the correct symbols in a keypad the correct order of these symbols will be revealed. They can now describe these back to their partners who can input their symbols on their own keypad, in the right order, and open the doors.

=== Rupture ===
- Aim: Recovery of four water filtration flasks from rupture chamber.
- Value: Each flask is worth 25 Salvage Points.
- Special Difficulties: Flasks must be floated through pipes by redirecting the flow of water.
- Time Limit

Event is a race between the two teams.
The first team to collect two flasks will end the game but both teams will score.

- Details

The teams begin this challenge working together to fasten the base on to a structure to stop it leaking. Once this is done water will flow up four pipes onto of the structure causing the flasks to float up. Each pipe has a series of holes that must be plugged; the corks provided however are very long and will physically prevent the flasks from rising.

The solution is to plug the holes below the flask and slowly work up. In practice the teams simply use their hands to close off the holes while a team member reaches down the tube.

=== Steel Works ===
- Aim: Recovery of twenty titanium ore nuggets from boxes located high on chamber wall.
- Value: Each ore sample is worth 5 Salvage Points.
- Time Limit: 6.00 Minutes
- Special Difficulties

Steelworks construction extremely unstable.
Scavengers must hunt as a pack and share salvage.

- Details

As the team cross a bridge into the steel works a hostile alien shoots down the bridge preventing their retreat. The commander leaves the team on the central platform via the exit bridge but this too is shot down - almost killing the commander.

Android: Commander should remember the first principle of salvage missions. Scavengers are dispensable, Commanders are not.

The team, now stranded must use the sides of one of the collapsed bridges as a ladder to climb to a high locker where four boxes are hidden. These must be returned to the team where they can be searched for the ore samples. The boxes contain white packing material along with both golden and silver ore samples; the Scavengers are expected to know or remember that titanium ore is silver.

The team must now use their makeshift ladder to climb down onto the second broken bridge, now at a sharp angle. From here they can traverse to the finishing platform.

=== The Final Abyss ===
- Aim

Construction of a swing to carry salvage across the void. Additional salvage available.

- Value
  - Existing salvage carried across the void valued at the original rate.
  - Two Pulse Barrels valued at 20sp
  - Two Fuel Rods valued at 15sp
  - Three Ammunition boxes valued at 10sp
- Additional Salvage in Final
  - Two Component Crates valued at 30sp
- Special Difficulties: All failed Scavengers will be abandoned on Cyclops
- Time Limit: 6.00 Minutes
- Details

In this test scavengers first slid down a rope to a gantry housing the equipment needed to build a rope swing for each team. Construction of the swing involved several time-consuming steps:

1. The male Scavenger must climb up a large girder several meters long and inclined at a 45 degree angle and attach a carabina and rope to the end.
2. The female Scavenger must then winch up the end of the girder to the correct position for the swing to function.
3. The male Scavenger then secures an A-Frame to support the swing.

Once the swing is constructed the male Scavenger swings across ensuring that the swing has one additional rope with him and one left with his partner. This allows the swing to be pulled to and fro with salvage attached. The Scavengers must then use their remaining time to get their existing salvage and any additional salvage across the void followed finally by the female Scavenger.

Fuel Rods were typically put into the teams existing salvage bags giving them an easy 30 point boost while the remaining salvage could be transferred most efficiently one piece at a time - although several teams attempted otherwise.

In the final pyrotechnic explosions were used to make the scavengers panic and an alien character attempted to pull Scavengers back into the void after their rope-swing.

The docking bay for the Vulture shuttlecraft was located on the opposite side of the void. If the Scavengers failed to board the shuttlecraft before the time limit expired, they were considered abandoned on Cyclops and their final score for the episode would be zero, effectively disqualifying them from the tournament. They would also have been disqualified if only one member of the team had made it back to the ship, but this eventuality never occurred.

== International versions ==
A Spanish remake of the show was aired on Antena 3 in 1994, hosted by Bertín Osborne and recorded on the British set.
