= Gina Philips =

American actress (born 1970)

- Born: Gina Consolo; May 10, 1970 (age 56); Miami Beach, Florida, U.S.
- Occupation: Actress
- Years active: 1992–present
- Spouse: Lee Nelson (m. 2009)
- Children: 1

Gina Philips (née Consolo; born May 10, 1970) is an American actress. She is primarily recognized for her portrayal of Trish Jenner in the horror film Jeepers Creepers (2001).

== Early life ==
Philips was born in Miami Beach, Florida, to an Italian father and an Ashkenazi Jewish mother.

== Career ==
On television, Philips primarily appeared in bit parts on single episodes of television series, as well as roles in made-for-TV movies. She did appear in recurring roles for one season each of Ally McBeal, Boston Public and Hawaii.

Philips landed her first supporting role in the 1995 TV movie Deadly Invasion: The Killer Bee Nightmare. In 1996, Philips had a small role in the TV movie Unforgivable as Tammy, the daughter of an abusive father. In 1997, Philips played her first lead role in the TV movie Born Into Exile as Holly, a 14-year-old runaway.

Her next film was the American comedy drama The Anarchist Cookbook, which received mostly negative reviews.

In 2004, she starred in the low budget horror films Dead & Breakfast and Jennifer's Shadow. In 2006, Philips again played a lead in a low-budget horror film, Ring Around the Rosie as a young woman plagued by horrible visions and dreams of tragic past events. The next year she starred in the horror film The Sickhouse and the TV movie My Baby Is Missing (a.k.a. Stolen Innocence).

In 2011, Philips began work on the Canadian psychological thriller Chained. In 2017, she reprised her role as Trish Jenner for a brief cameo in Jeepers Creepers 3.

== Filmography ==
=== Film ===
Year	Title	Role	Notes
1993	Love, Honor & Obey: The Last Mafia Marriage	Adult Gigi	TV movie
1994	Rave, Dancing to a Different Beat	Lorri	
1994	Lies of the Heart: The Story of Laurie Kellogg	Alicia	TV movie
1994	When the Bough Breaks	Teenage Girl	
1995	Deadly Invasion: The Killer Bee Nightmare	Tracy Ingram	TV movie
1995	Breaking Free	Lindsay Kurtz	
1996	No Greater Love	Alexis 'Lexie' Winfield	TV movie
1996	Unforgivable	Tammy	TV movie
1996	Her Costly Affair	Tess Weston	TV movie
1997	Born Into Exile	Holly Nolan	TV movie
1997	The Advocate's Devil	Emma	TV movie
1997	Bella Mafia	Rosa Luciano	TV movie
1998	Telling You	Kristen Barrett	
1998	Living Out Loud	Lisa Francato	
2001	Nailed	Mia Romano	
2001	Jeepers Creepers	Trish Jenner	
2002	The Anarchist Cookbook	Karla	
2003	Something More	Orangina	Short
2004	Dead & Breakfast	Melody	
2004	Jennifer's Shadow	Jennifer Cassi/Johanna	
2004	Sam & Joe	Lisa	
2006	Ring Around the Rosie	Karen Baldwin	Video
2006	Love & Debate	Jordan Landa	
2007	My Baby Is Missing	Jenna Davis	TV movie
2008	The Sick House	Anna	
2012	Hijacked	Michelle Leib	
2012	Chained	Marie	
2017	Jeepers Creepers 3	Trish Jenner	
2019	Doom: Annihilation	Daisy (voice)	
2026	Twisted	Detective Diane Warricker	

=== Television ===
Year	Title	Role	Notes
1992	Growing Pains	Gail	Episode: "The Five Fingers of Ben"
1992	Great Scott!	Margie	Episode: "Stripe Gripe"
1993	Blossom	Tracy	Episode: "The Last Laugh"
1993	Star Trek: Deep Space Nine	Varis Sul	Episode: "The Storyteller"
1993	Silk Stalkings	Stacy	Episode: "Daddy Dearest"
1995	Strange Luck	Jensen	Episode: "Over Exposure"
1996	Dark Skies	Marnie Lane	Episode: "Dark Days Night"
1996	Sliders	Devin	Episode: "Desert Storm"
1998	Michael Hayes	Jessica Hartman	Episode: "Devotion"
1998	Seven Days	Rebecca Rhodes	Episode: "Shadow Play"
1999–2000	Ally McBeal	Sandy Hingle	Recurring Cast: Season 3
2000	Buddy Faro	Tara Davies	Episode: "Done Away in a Manger"
2001	Boston Public	Jenna Miller	Recurring Cast: Season 1
2002	ER	ER Nurse Kathy	Episode: "Insurrection"
2002	CSI: Crime Scene Investigation	Raina Krell	Episode: "Blood Lust"
2004	Hawaii	Harper Woods	Recurring Cast
2007	Medium	Colleen Fitzpatrick Barlow	Episode: "Whatever Possessed You"
2007	Monk	Brandy Barber	Episode: "Mr. Monk and the Man Who Shot Santa Claus"
2010	CSI: NY	Maddie Harris	Episode: "Unusual Suspects"
