= Dark Planet (1997 film) =

- Directed by: Albert Magnoli
- Written by: J. Reifel
- Produced by: Barnet Bain; John Eyres
- Starring: Michael York
- Production company: EGM Film International
- Release date: September 16, 1997
- Country: United States
- Language: English
- Budget: $2-3 million

Dark Planet is a 1997 American science-fiction film.

== Plot ==
Two sides, one known as the Alphas and the other the Rebels, struggle in a brutal war on Earth and in outer space. When a habitable planet is discovered in orbit around a star that is on the far side of a dangerous wormhole, the two sides mysteriously set aside their differences and send a joint mission to explore the planet. The mission of the starship Scylla is soon beset by political intrigue and treachery, jeopardizing not only the mission, but the lives of the entire crew.

== Cast ==
- Michael York as Captain Winter
- Paul Mercurio as Hawke
- Harley Jane Kozak as Brendan
- Ed O'Ross as Byron
- Maria Ford as Salera
- Phil Morris as Fletcher

== Production ==
Producer John Eyres had originally owned a chain of video stores, known as ABC, in the United Kingdom which he had decided to sell in order to move into the film production business. Eyres then co-founded EGM Film International so named for the founding partners of Eyres, Geoff Griffiths, and Mr. Malick (the latter two having been bought out and departed respecitvely leaving Eyres as the sole owner. The first film produced by EGM was a small horror film known as Goodnight, God Bless, a low budget horror film made for approximately $110,000 that had performed well on home video. After the success of Goodnight, God Bless, the producers followed on with a science fiction film, Project Shadowchaser, which was also quite successful and saw EGM relocate their operations from Cardiff, Wales to Los Angeles, California.

Dark Planet was part of a plan by producer Barnet Bain to see if he could produce three films back-to-back using a single sound stage with the other two films being Timelock and The Apocalypse. Albert Magnoli became involved as he and Bain were friends and when Magnoli had an opening in his schedule Bain sent him the script for Dark Planet with Magnoli doing some uncredited script revisions and coming on board to direct.

== Release ==
Dark Planet was released on home video on September 16, 1997.
