= John Lebar =

British actor

- Occupation: Actor
- Known for: His giant stature

John Lebar is a British actor known for his giant stature; standing at 7 feet 3 inches (2.21 m).

In 2007 he starred as a plague doctor in The Sick House.

Lebar portrays one of the Space Jockey aliens seen in Ridley Scott's 2012 science fiction film, Prometheus.

== Filmography ==
- The League of Gentlemen: "Destination: Royston Vasey" (2000) as Irish Giant
- Lexx: "Viva Lexx Vegas" (2002) as Mummy
- Ordan's Forest (2005) as Ordan
- Brainiac Science Abuse (2006) as Tall John
- The Sickhouse (2007) as Plague Doctor
- Crooked House (2008) as The Abomination
- Sherlock (2010) as Golem – Episode: "The Great Game"
- Prometheus (2012) as Ghost Engineer
