= Shootings of Alfred and Rosemary Podgis =

American homicide incident

- Date: July 5, 1982
- Location: Loch Arbour, New Jersey, U.S.
- Type: Homicide
- Deaths: 2
- Convicted: Scott Franz, Bruce Curtis

On July 5, 1982, Alfred Podgis and his wife Rosemary Podgis were fatally shot in their home in Loch Arbour, New Jersey, United States. Scott Robert Franz, Rosemary's son by a previous marriage, was convicted of the murder of Alfred, his stepfather. Franz's high school friend Bruce Anthony Curtis, a Canadian citizen who was visiting the Podgis home, was convicted of the aggravated manslaughter of Rosemary. Both were sentenced to twenty years' imprisonment.

The crime attracted significant public attention in Canada, where supporters of Curtis – whose defense was that the killing of Rosemary was accidental – believed he had not received a fair trial or sentence in the U.S., and successfully lobbied for his repatriation to serve out his sentence in the Canadian prison system. The case became the subject of a book and a television film.

== Background ==
On June 29, 1982, Bruce Curtis flew from his home in Canada to the United States, having been invited by his American friend, Scott Franz, to spend time at Franz's home in Loch Arbour, New Jersey. The two teenagers (both born 1964) had met at King's-Edgehill, a private Canadian boarding school in Windsor, Nova Scotia, where they had recently graduated. Franz was living with his mother Rosemary (aged 56) and stepfather Alfred ("Al") Podgis (aged 58), Rosemary's second husband. Alfred was a mail carrier who owned a number of guns. Curtis was the adopted son of Alice and Jim Curtis, a Canadian Air Force officer, who had paid for his trip to New Jersey as a graduation gift.

== Fatal shootings ==
During Curtis's stay, Franz had a number of heated arguments with Alfred Podgis. According to later trial testimony, Alfred possessed a violent temper, which led the boys to seek protection by arming themselves with rifles from Alfred's gun collection. On the morning of July 5, 1982, Franz shot and killed Alfred in an upstairs bedroom. Moments later downstairs, Rosemary was shot dead by a rifle carried by Curtis, who maintained he had accidentally discharged the firearm while attempting to flee the house after hearing the gunshot upstairs.

After the shootings, Franz and Curtis made a decision to conceal the homicides and flee the scene rather than notify authorities. They attempted to clean the house of bloodstains and loaded the Podgises' bodies into Alfred's van. The two youths drove interstate to Clinton County, Pennsylvania, where they disposed of the two bodies in a ravine. They then drove to Texas, intending to seek out one of Franz's sisters there. In the meantime, police had begun a search for the Podgises, Franz, and Curtis after another sister of Franz reported them missing. Following the discovery of the Podgises' bodies in Clinton County, Franz and Curtis were arrested on July 10 at a motel in Richardson, Texas. Both were charged with murder.

== Trial ==
The nine-day trial took place in New Jersey in March 1983. Franz pleaded guilty to the murder of Alfred Podgis as part of a plea bargain whereby he testified against Curtis, who pleaded not guilty to the charge of murdering Rosemary Podgis. The jury found Curtis guilty of the lesser crime of aggravated manslaughter. He was acquitted of a separate charge of stealing Alfred's van. Franz and Curtis both received the same sentence: twenty years' imprisonment with a minimum non-parole period of ten years.

== Aftermath ==
Curtis's family in Canada, believing he should have received a significantly lighter sentence than Franz, began a high-profile campaign to have his sentence reduced or overturned. After an appeal in 1984 to the Superior Court of New Jersey was dismissed, Curtis's supporters successfully lobbied to have him repatriated to Canada to serve out his sentence there. In May 1988, Curtis was transferred from New Jersey to a Canadian prison in Kingston, Ontario. Canadian authorities granted him day parole in July 1989, and full parole in 1990.

In March 1992, Franz escaped from custody for two weeks after he and a fellow inmate absconded from a New Jersey halfway house and fled to the West Coast. They were apprehended in San Marino, California, and were returned to prison in New Jersey. Franz later obtained parole in 1996. Social Security records indicate he died in Trenton, New Jersey on August 4, 1997.

== Book and TV film ==
In 1986, Canadian author David Hayes published a book about the case, No Easy Answers: The Trial and Conviction of Bruce Curtis (reprinted in the U.S. as Blood Knot ). A Canadian television film directed by Graeme Campbell, Journey into Darkness: The Bruce Curtis Story (screened in the U.S. as Deadly Betrayal ), was released in 1991.
