= All I Want for Christmas (film) =

1991 film by Robert Lieberman

- Theatrical release poster
- Directed by: Robert Lieberman
- Written by: Thom Eberhardt; Richard Kramer
- Produced by: Marykay Powell
- Starring: Harley Jane Kozak; Jamey Sheridan; Ethan Randall; Kevin Nealon; Thora Birch; Leslie Nielsen; Lauren Bacall
- Cinematography: Robbie Greenberg
- Edited by: Peter E. Berger; Dean Goodhill
- Music by: Bruce Broughton
- Production company: Paramount Pictures
- Distributed by: Paramount Pictures
- Release date: November 8, 1991
- Running time: 92 minutes
- Country: United States
- Language: English
- Budget: $12 million
- Box office: $14,812,144

All I Want for Christmas is a 1991 American romantic comedy Christmas film directed by Robert Lieberman, written by Thom Eberhardt and Richard Kramer, and starring Harley Jane Kozak, Lauren Bacall, Thora Birch, Ethan Randall, and Leslie Nielsen. The score was composed by Bruce Broughton, including a theme-setting song by Stephen Bishop.

== Plot ==
In New York City, siblings Ethan and Hallie O'Fallon launch a scheme – involving their parents, Catherine and Michael, and maternal grandmother, Lillian Brooks – to get what they most want for Christmas. When Hallie meets Santa Claus, she asks for an unusual gift: her divorced parents back together again.

As the children embark on their adventure, and while planning ahead, Tony Boer takes an interest in Catherine. Ethan gets pre-occupied with not only his parents' romantic dilemma, but also his own, one brought about by his new friendship with Stephanie. An elaborate scheme evolves with mice, telephone calls, and an ice cream truck, as Ethan and Hallie try to achieve their goal with help from Stephanie, and see Tony as their primary obstacle. They succeed with a little Christmas magic from Santa Claus. Catherine decides to reject Tony and remarry Michael, completing Hallie's wish. Stephanie and Ethan talk one more time as she gives him a kiss. They begin a relationship, and everyone lives happily ever after.

== Cast ==
- Harley Jane Kozak as Catherine O'Fallon
- Jamey Sheridan as Michael O'Fallon
- Ethan Randall as Ethan O'Fallon
- Kevin Nealon as Tony Boer
- Thora Birch as Hallie O'Fallon
- Andrea Martin as Olivia
- Lauren Bacall as Lillian Brooks
- Amy Oberer as Stephanie
- Renée Taylor as Sylvia
- Felicity LaFortune as Susan
- Camille Saviola as Sonya
- Leslie Nielsen as Santa Claus
- Marc Alaimo as Frankie (credited as "Michael Alaimo")
- Josh Keaton as Brad
- Elizabeth Cherney as Paige

== Production ==
In June 1991, it was announced Thom Eberhardt was set to write and direct the film, which had two working titles, Home For Christmas and Home For the Holidays. One month later, various sources reported that Eberhardt had been replaced by director-producer Robert Lieberman, who was known primarily for television and commercial work. On July 24, 1991, The Hollywood Reporter stated that the film was being rushed into production by Brandon Tartikoff, a former television executive and Paramount Pictures' new chairman, with the goal of a 1991, rather than 1992, holiday-season opening. Shortly thereafter the film was given its release title All I Want For Christmas, would be his first for the studio. Due to the short shooting schedule, Eberhardt amicably departed the film. Gail Parent and Neal Israel were the original co-writers of Eberhardt's script, but following re-writes by Richard Kramer both their names went uncredited.

== Reception ==
The film was panned by critics. On the review aggregator website Rotten Tomatoes, 13% of 16 critics' reviews are positive.

Rita Kempley wrote in The Washington Post that "when it comes to yuletide cheer, All I Want for Christmas ranks just under dead reindeer on the roof. A yuckie, yuppie kid dramedy, it was directed lickety-split by Robert Lieberman, who is known—maybe even renowned—for his Christmas episode of thirtysomething. That's probably why this stocking full of Xmas cliches plays like a feature-length spinoff of that self-absorbed series, down to its ensemble cast of dull people without actual problems. Desson Howe of the same newspaper remarked that "in an obvious attempt to reproduce the old-fashioned magic of a Manhattan yuletide, the filmmakers just toss in the elements. From the seasonal muffler around Birch's hands to the 80,000 pounds of special-effects snow wafting benevolently down, everything looks as though someone ordered it by catalogue."

The film received a Two Thumbs Down rating from Siskel & Ebert. Gene Siskel only reviewed it on television, where he remarked that "there isn't an attractive character in the movie." Roger Ebert opened his review by writing:

All I want for Christmas is to never see "All I Want for Christmas" again. Here is a calculating holiday fable that is phony to its very bones—artificial, contrived, illogical, manipulative and stupid. It's one of those movies that insults your intelligence by assuming you have no memory, no common sense, and no knowledge of how people behave when they are not in the grip of an idiotic screenplay.

On television, he remarked that lines similar to the one he opened his print review with would be used by other film critics. Janet Maslin of The New York Times wrote that "the emotions on display in the vigorously heartwarming All I Want for Christmas are as fake as the snow", adding that "as directed by Robert Lieberman, who has more than 800 commercials to his credit and can now chalk up another, this film is filled with good-looking people and products that appear to have walked right out of a store." Kathleen Carroll had a warmer reaction to the film in the New York Daily News, where she called it "a mildly entertaining children's fantasy with the cookie-cutter look of a TV movie." Peter Rainer of the Los Angeles Times said it was "like The Miracle on 34th Street for the dysfunctional family era: the 'mature' material is sugared with whimsy." People magazine said the film was one of the worst of 1991, writing:

Two children try to reunite their estranged parents before the yuletide rolls in. Bah, humbug! Paramount chief Brandon Tartikoff deserves coal in his stocking for passing off this made-in-six-weeks quickie TV movie as a feature film.

Catherine Dunphy of The Toronto Star called the film a "seasonal travesty" that "is everything you hate about Dec. 25—the tacky decorations, the forced sentiment, the calculated cutesy stuff of kids with their eyes on the main chance, Le. the booty of Christmas morning." Brian D. Johnson of Maclean's wrote, "directed by Robert Lieberman, who has the dubious distinction of having made more than 800 TV commercials, All 1 Want for Christmas is witless, insipid and insidious. The idea of teaching children that they can weld their divorced parents back together with a little magic and manipulation seems reprehensible. Fortunately, the movie is not even credible enough to fool the kids."

Outside of the North American continent, Hugo Davenport of England's The Daily Telegraph said that "during this emetically cute comedy [...] all I wanted was a blindfold and a set of industrial ear-plugs, or, failing that, a heavy-duty airline sick-bag. No wonder Leslie [Nielsen] has concealed himself behind Santa’s whiskers; poor Lauren Bacall, as the glamorous granny, has nowhere to hide."

== Home media ==
The film was released on DVD on October 5, 2004. The film was also released in the digital format.

== See also ==
- List of American films of 1991
- List of Christmas films
