= My Son Johnny =

- Genre: Drama
- Written by: Peter Nelson
- Directed by: Peter Levin
- Starring: Michele Lee; Rick Schroder; Corin Nemec; Rip Torn
- Music by: Dana Kaproff
- Country of origin: United States
- Original language: English

Production
- Executive producers: David R. Ginsburg; Carla Singer
- Producers: Paul A. Mones; Michael O. Gallant
- Cinematography: Ron Orieux
- Editor: John A. Martinelli
- Running time: 90 minutes
- Production companies: ABC Productions; Citadel Entertainment

Original release
- Network: CBS
- Release: November 10, 1991

My Son Johnny is a 1991 American fact-based made-for-television drama film starring Michele Lee, Rick Schroder and Corin Nemec, directed by Peter Levin. It was originally broadcast on CBS as The CBS Sunday Movie on November 10, 1991.

== Plot ==
Johnny Cortino is a 21-year-old hoodlum returning home to Baltimore after a stint in California; exactly why he's back is not clear and, when confronted for details, Johnny is able to fast-talk his way out of every corner he is backed in to. Yet, it is clear that his widowed mother Marianne is glad to see her son that - despite his problems - is still the apple of her eye. And it is equally clear that 17-year-old Anthony is terrified that his older brother is back in the house.

As soon as Johnny returns home, the war of intimidation quickly resumes, and Anthony finally reaches the breaking-point when, after a particularly nasty beating by Johnny, he pulls a gun on his brother and shoots him to death. With Anthony facing a life sentence for murder, Marianne has one chance of saving him: following years of denial about Johnny's bullying, she is torn between upholding his memory and defending her younger offspring, but also realizes she must confront the terrible truth about Johnny and, before the eyes of the world, admit there has been a lifetime of sibling violence. In the end, the verdict is read and Anthony is found not guilty.

== Cast ==
- Michele Lee as Marianne Cortino
- Ricky Schroder as Johnny Cortino
- Corin Nemec as Anthony Cortino
- Mariangela Pino as Rhoda Cortino
- Stephen Dimopoulos as Louie Cortino
- Ken Pogue as Judge Burke
- Joy Coghill as Anna Cortino
- Gwynyth Walsh as Janet David
- Rip Torn as Brian Stansbury
