= Fox Butterfield =

American journalist

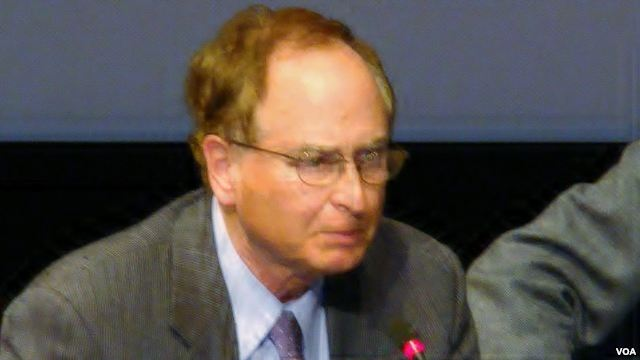
- Fox Butterfield
- Born: July 8, 1939 (age 87); Lancaster, Pennsylvania
- Education: Harvard University
- Occupations: Journalist, author
- Writing career
- Genres: Journalism, non-fiction

Fox Butterfield (born 8 July 1939) is an American journalist who spent much of his 30-year career reporting for The New York Times.

Butterfield became a stringer for the New York Times in 1967 and was a full-fledged foreign correspondent by 1969. He served as Times bureau chief in Saigon, Tokyo, Hong Kong, Beijing, and Boston and as a correspondent in Washington and New York City. During that time, he was awarded the Pulitzer Prize as a member of The New York Times team that published the Pentagon Papers, the Pentagon's secret history of the Vietnam War, in 1971 and won a 1983 National Book Award for Nonfiction for China: Alive in the Bitter Sea, an account of his experience as the first Times reporter allowed in China after the revolution. (Note: This was the award for hardcover "General Nonfiction". From 1980 to 1983 in National Book Awards history there were several nonfiction subcategories including General Nonfiction, with dual hardcover and paperback awards in most categories.) He also wrote All God's Children: The Bosket Family and the American Tradition of Violence (1995) about the child criminal Willie Bosket.

In 1990, Butterfield wrote an article on the first African-American to be elected president of the Harvard Law Review, future president of the United States Barack Obama.

== Personal life ==
Butterfield was born in Lancaster, Pennsylvania, the son of Lyman Henry Butterfield, a historian and a director of the Institute of Early American History and Culture in Williamsburg, Virginia. The Canadian industrialist Cyrus S. Eaton was one of his grandfathers. His father named him "Fox" after the English Parliamentary leader, Charles James Fox, who sided with the colonists.

Butterfield graduated from the Lawrenceville School in 1957. He began studying Chinese history, and the Chinese language, while an undergraduate at Harvard University. He received a bachelor's degree summa cum laude in 1961 and a master's degree in 1964. He continued at Harvard working toward a Ph.D., but when he went to Taiwan in 1967 to do research for his dissertation, he was lured away to work for the New York Times. In 1979 he was granted an honorary doctorate from the University of Puget Sound.

In 1988, Butterfield married Elizabeth Mehren, a reporter for The Los Angeles Times. He has two children, Ethan and Sarah, from a previous marriage. He and Mehren had a daughter, Emily (26 Mar 1988-17 May 1988), and a son, Sam (1990–2013).

Michael Moriarty played Fox Butterfield in the 1993 television movie Born Too Soon, based on Mehren's book about their daughter Emily, who was born prematurely in the late 1980s and lived only six weeks. Mehren was played by Pamela Reed. The couple live in Hingham, Massachusetts, about which Butterfield has sometimes written in The Times.

== Criticism ==
"The Butterfield Effect" is a term coined by James Taranto in his online editorial column for The Wall Street Journal called Best of the Web Today, typically bringing up a headline, "Fox Butterfield, Is That You?" later "Fox Butterfield, Call Your Office". Taranto coined the term after reading Butterfield's articles discussing the "paradox" of crime rates falling while the prison population grew due to tougher sentencing guidelines. Butterfield quoted F.B.I. statistics that from 1994 to 2003 there was a 16 percent drop in arrests for violent crime, including a 36 percent decrease in arrests for murder and a 25 percent decrease in arrests for robbery, but the tough new sentencing laws led to a growth in inmates being sent to prison. Taranto and a Jewish World Review columnist, along with the conservative Weekly Standard, felt that Butterfield should have considered that the tougher sentencing guidelines might have reduced crime by causing more criminals to be in jail.

== Bibliography ==
External videos
- Booknotes interview with Butterfield on All God's Children, March 31, 1996, C-SPAN
- Presentation by Butterfield on In My Father's House, November 7, 2018, C-SPAN

- China: Alive in the Bitter Sea (1982)
- All God's Children: The Bosket Family and the American Tradition of Violence (1995)
- In My Father's House: A New View of How Crime Runs in the Family, Knopf (2018)
