= King's-Edgehill School =

Coordinates: 44.983118°N 64.136782°W

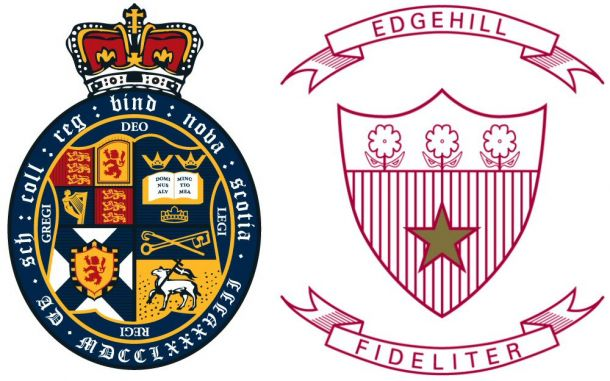

Location
- 33 King's-Edgehill Lane; Windsor, Nova Scotia, B0N 2T0; Canada

Information
- Type: Independent Co-educational Secondary
- Motto: Be More!
- Established: 1788; 238 years ago
- Headmaster: Joseph F. Seagram
- Grades: 6–12
- Enrollment: 340–350 (c. 220 Boarders, 130 Day Students)
- Colors: Red and Blue
- Website: www.kes.ns.ca

National Historic Site of Canada
- Official name: King's College National Historic Site of Canada
- Designated: 1923

King's-Edgehill School is a Canadian private university-preparatory boarding and day school located in the town of Windsor, Nova Scotia. It is the oldest English independent school in the Commonwealth outside the United Kingdom, founded by United Empire Loyalists as King's Collegiate School in 1788, and granted Royal Charter by King George III in 1802.

== History of King's Collegiate School ==
Charles Inglis by Robert Field

The agricultural town of Windsor was chosen by Charles Inglis, first overseas Bishop of the Anglican Church, for the founding of the school over the larger military centre and colonial capital of Halifax, some 60 km (40 mi) to the southeast, so "...that it be well away from taverns and houses of ill fame".

In April 1787, King George III gave Royal Assent to the establishment of King's Collegiate School, as well as to the establishment of the University of King's College—the first such honour to be bestowed upon any school in the British Empire. It is also claimed that Prince Edward, Duke of Kent took an interest in King's Collegiate School and University of King's College while stationed in Halifax as Commander-in-Chief, British North America.

The Academy at Windsor, known as the "Collegiate School", and the "King's Collegiate School" was opened on 1 November 1788, under the charge of Archibald Payne Inglis. Seventeen pupils were in attendance, among whom was John Inglis, subsequently the Right Rev. John Inglis, D. D. third Bishop of Nova Scotia.

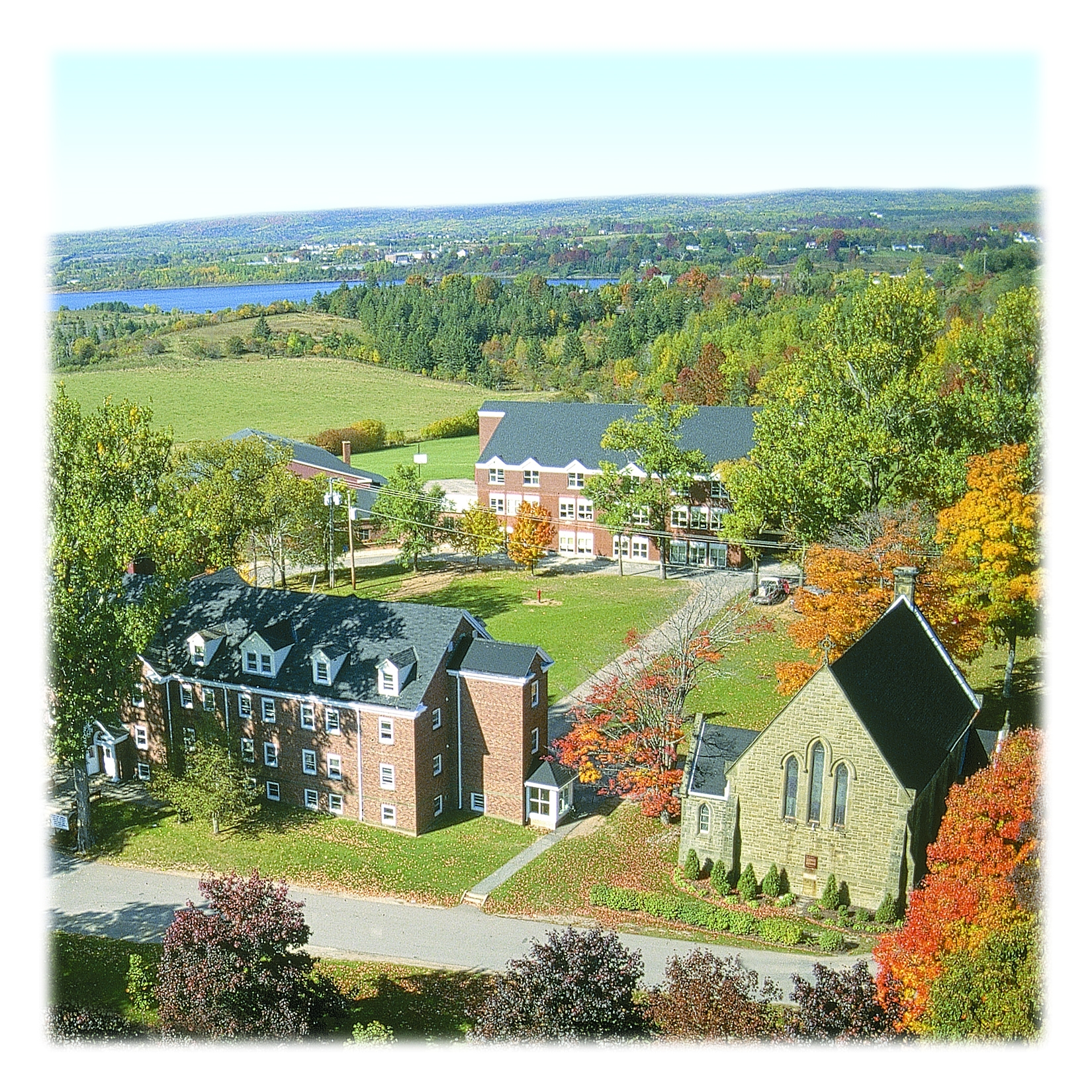
School Campus

In June 1890, the Anglican Diocese of Nova Scotia decided to establish a girls' school in Windsor to complement King's Collegiate School. Edgehill School opened in January 1891 and construction of a new building to house the new girls began in the following June.

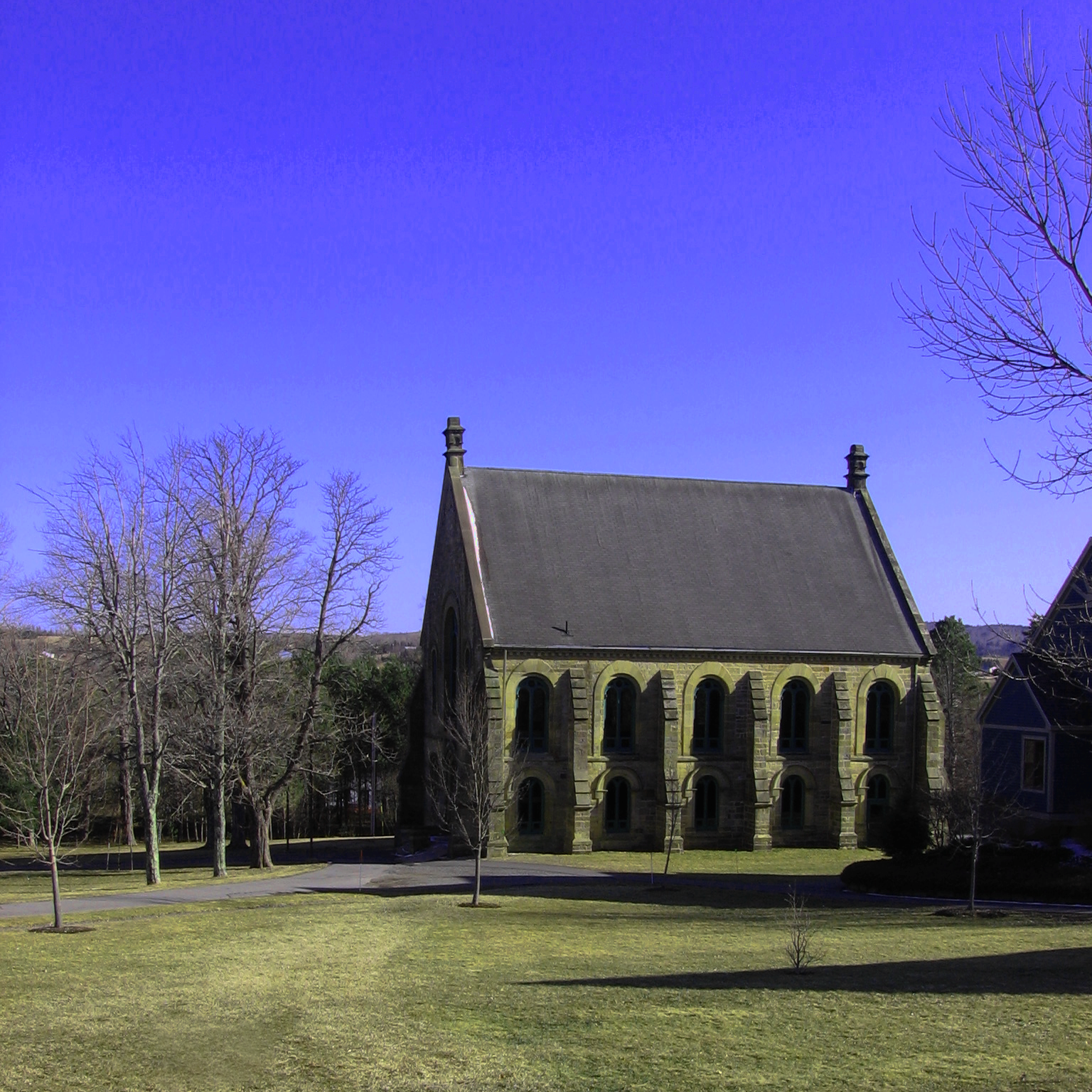
The sandstone library built by George Lang, survived the 1923 fire.

In 1920, a disastrous fire swept through the campus, causing irreparable damage to the main university buildings. With the encouragement of the Carnegie Foundation, which was promoting the consolidation of all Nova Scotian post-secondary institutions to Halifax around a nucleus formed by Dalhousie University, the University of King's College received funds to move into a newly built campus in Halifax. King's College remains an independent university, although its students enjoy affiliation privileges with Dalhousie. Its campus is located at the corner of Oxford Street and Coburg Road, occupying the northwest corner of Dalhousie's Studley Campus.

In 1923, the former King's College campus in Windsor was designated a National Historic Site, as it was the original site of the oldest university in the colonies which became Canada.

== History of Edgehill School for Girls ==
The initiatory step in the establishment of the Edgehill School for Girls was taken by the Alumni of King's College on June 25, 1890. The project was brought under the notice of the Synod of the Diocese of Nova Scotia in the address of the Bishop on June 27, 1890. The foundation of the new building was commenced on May 18, 1891. The corner-stone of the New Building was laid on June 23, 1891, by the Hon, Dir John C. Allen, D. C. L, Chief Justice of New Brunswick, assisted by the Very Rev. Dean Gilpin, D. D., Commissary of the Bishop of Nova Scotia.

During the Second World War, the Edgehill School was host to a group of approximately 30 female students from the Roedean School in East Sussex, England who had been evacuated. They travelled to Nova Scotia on the SS Duchess of Atholl.

On September 1, 2016, the former Edgehill School for Girls was struck by lightning. Despite the best efforts of fire crew, the ensuing fire destroyed the building.

== History ==
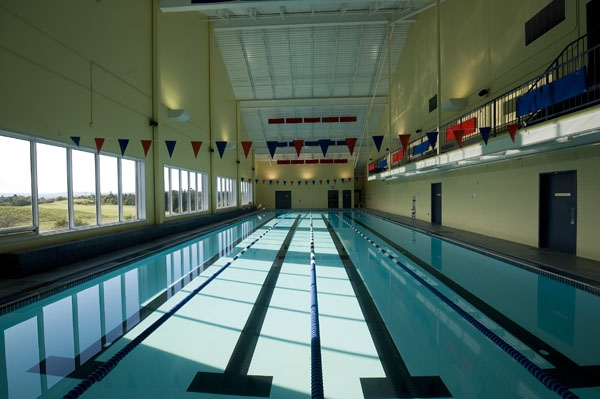
The 25m pool in the Ted Canavan Athletic Centre

In 1976 the governing bodies of both schools decided to amalgamate, and King's-Edgehill School was born.

Both King's Collegiate School and the newer Edgehill School remained on the Windsor campus and eventually expanded to include much of the 65-acre (260,000 m^{2}) site, therefore better hosting the athletic tournaments which take place every year.

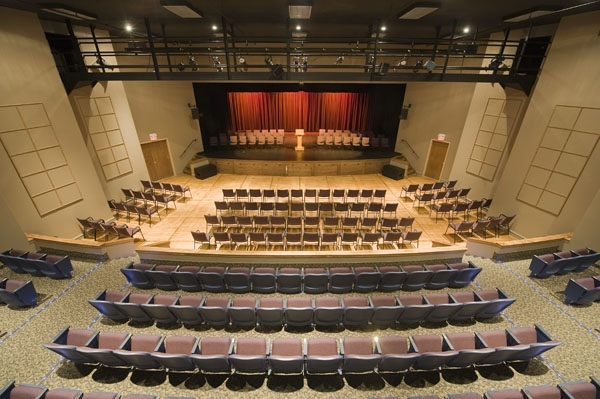
Fountain Cultural & Performing Arts Centre

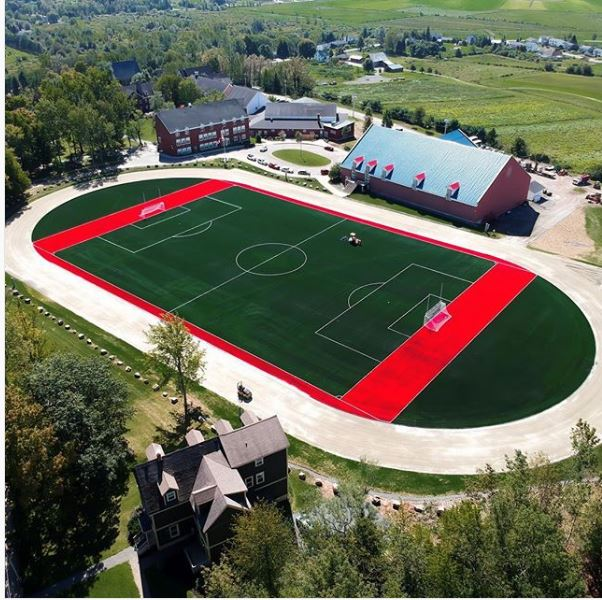
FIFA Regulation Turf Field

== King's College School (The Collegiate School), Edgehill School for Girls, King's-Edgehill School Timeline ==
- 1787 – Dr. Charles Inglis arrives in Nova Scotia
- 1788 – King's Collegiate School for boys opens with 17 students
- 1789 – George III gives Royal Assent to K.C.S.
- 1790 – The Academy commenced in the Susanna Francklin's house.
- 1794 – The Academy moved into the unfinished College buildings, which had begun its construction in 1790
- 1800 – The boys of K.C.S. adopt the game of hurley to the ice of Long Pond
- 1817 – Construction of The Academy building was begun, the story being that of the eight thousand pounds spent to build this stone building, three thousand is said to have come from the Arms Duty Fund raised in Castine, Maine, during the War of 1812; it was ready for use in 1822
- 1822 – New Stone Structure was completed for the Academy on the College Property.
- 1863 – Convocation Hall is built, Canada's first library museum building
- 1867 – Canadian Confederation: Among the Fathers of Confederation are 3 former K.C.S. students
- 1871 – Fire destroyed The Academy (Willetts House – Lower School)
- 1877 – The boys' school moved into a new wooden building constructed on the site of the stone building and was designated King's Collegiate School
- 1877 – Hensley Memorial Chapel opens on the first Sunday of Michaelmas Term
- 1891 – Edgehill School for Girls opens with 27 resident and 15 day students
- 1905 – Because of poor drainage, the school was moved to higher ground.
- 1906 – Cadet Programme Begins. Cadet Corp #254
- 1915 – The School changed its name to King's College School
- 1920 – Disastrous fire destroys the main buildings of the University of King's College
- 1923 – The school and the university separate; King's College moves to Halifax
- 1931 – Inglis House is erected on the foundation of the original 1790 College building
- 1976 – Amalgamation to form King's-Edgehill School
- 1981 – King's-Edgehill offers the International Baccalaureate Programme, the sixth school in Canada to do so
- 2005 – New construction: The Ted Canavan Athletic Centre, The David K. Wilson Gymnasium and The Spafford Pool.
- 2006 – The opening of The Fountain Performing Arts Centre
- 2018 – FIFA Regulation Turf Field Installed on Jakeman Field.

== Present day ==
Since 2005, there have been major renovations of the school, ranging from the addition of a floor to the girls dormitory to the construction of the Ted Canavan Athletic Centre, complete with a pool, double gym and well-equipped exercise facilities, the opening of The Fountain Performing Arts Centre to host musical performances, concerts and dance productions and the most recent addition to the campus, the all weather artificial turf field and running track.

The current headmaster is Joseph F. Seagram. His predecessor is David Penaluna, KES headmaster from 1995–2008.

== Headmasters and Principals (King's) ==
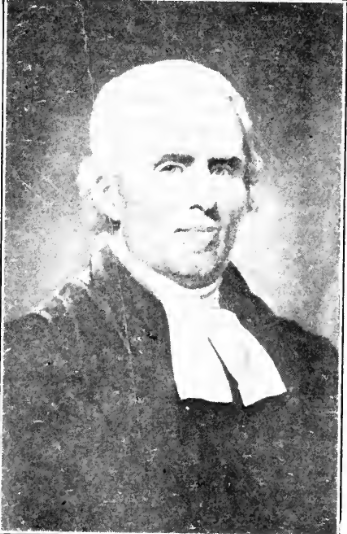
Rev William Cochran (clergyman), president for more than 40 years

Title	First Name	Middle	Last Name	Start	End	Number	
Rev.	Archibald	Paine	Inglis	1788	1790	1	
Rev.	William		Cochran	1790	1802	2	
Vacant				1802	1803	Vacant	
Rev.	William		Twining	1803	1804	3	
Mr.	George		Ironside (Acting)	1804	1806	4	
Rev.	William		Cochran	1806	1808	5	
Rev.	William	Colsel	King	1808	1815	6	
Rev.	John	Thomas	Twining	1815	1817	7	
Rev.	William	Colsel	King	1817	1818	8	
Rev.	Christopher		Milner	1818	1819	9	
Rev.	Dr. Charles		Porter (Acting)	1819	1820	10	
Mr.	H.	Nelson	Arnold (Acting)	1820	1821	11	
Rev.	Francis		Salt	1821	1832	12	
Rev.	Josiah	H.	Clinch	1832	1835	13	
School Closed December 1835				1835	1836	Closed	
Rev.	William	Burgess	King	1836	1846	14	
Mr.	William	James	Irwin	1846	1848	15	
Vacant Principalship July 1, 1847 – Oct 1, 1848				1847	1848	Vacant	
Rev.	John	G.	Mulholland	1848	1853	16	
School Closed Dec 1853 – Aug 1854				1853	1854	Closed	
Rev.	David	W.	Pickett	1854	1861	17	
Vacant Principalship June 1861 – Sept 1862				1861	1862	Vacant	
Rev.	John Thomas	Mark Willoughby	Blackman	1863	1867	18	
Rev.	Geo.	Branson	Dodwell	1867	1873	19	
School Closed June 1873 – Sept 1875				1873	1875	Closed	
Rev.	John		Butler	1875	1876	20	
Rev.	Charles	Edward	Willet	1876	1888	21	
Rev.	Arnoldus		Miller	1888	1892	22	
Mr.	Henry	M.	Bradford	1893	1897	23	
Mr.	Fred	T.	Handsombody	1897	1914	24	
Rev.	Canon	W. W.	Judd	1914	1927	25	
Mr.	Charles		Scott	1927	1934	26	
Rev.	Gerald		White	1934	1943	27	
Mr.	N	R.	Waddington	1943	1947	28	
Mr.	J.	S.	Erskine (Acting)	1947	1948	29	
Lt. Col	John	A.	Hebb	1948	1952	30	
Rev.	J.	Franklin	Rudderham	1952	1954	31	
Mr.	Lloyd	R	Gesner	1954	1960	32	
Mr.	John	S.	Derrick	1960	1973	33	
Dr.	Thomas	T.	Menzies	1973	1988	34	
Mr.	Geoffrey	Read	Smith	1988	1990	35	
Mr.	John	A.	Messenger	1990	1995	36	
Mr.	David	R.	Penaluna	1995	2008	37	David Penaluna
Mr.	Joseph	Frederick	Seagram	2008	Present	38	

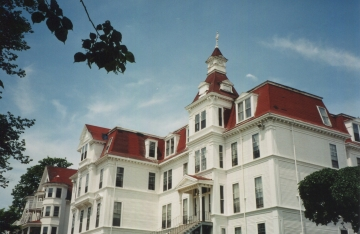
Edgehill School for Girls – 1997

== Headmistresses/Principals Edgehill School for Girls (Founded 1891) ==
Number	Title	First Name	Middle Name	Last Name	Start	End	Number
1	Miss	Hannah		Machin	1891	1897	
2	Miss	Blanche	L.	Lefroy	1897	1905	
3	Miss	Gena		Smith	1905	1919	
4	Miss	Mildred	H.	Roechling	1919	1946	
5	Miss	Barbara	S.	Briggs	1946	1954	
6	Miss	Jean		O'Neill	1954	1958	
7	Miss	Sarah	E.G.	MacDonald	1958	1962	
8	Miss	Brenda		Fowler	1962	1966	
9	Mr.	Seymour	C.	Gordon	1966	1967	
10	Miss	Dorothy		McLean	1967	1968	
11	Mr.	John	S.	Derrick	1968	1973	
12	Miss	Gail		Emmerson	1974	1976	

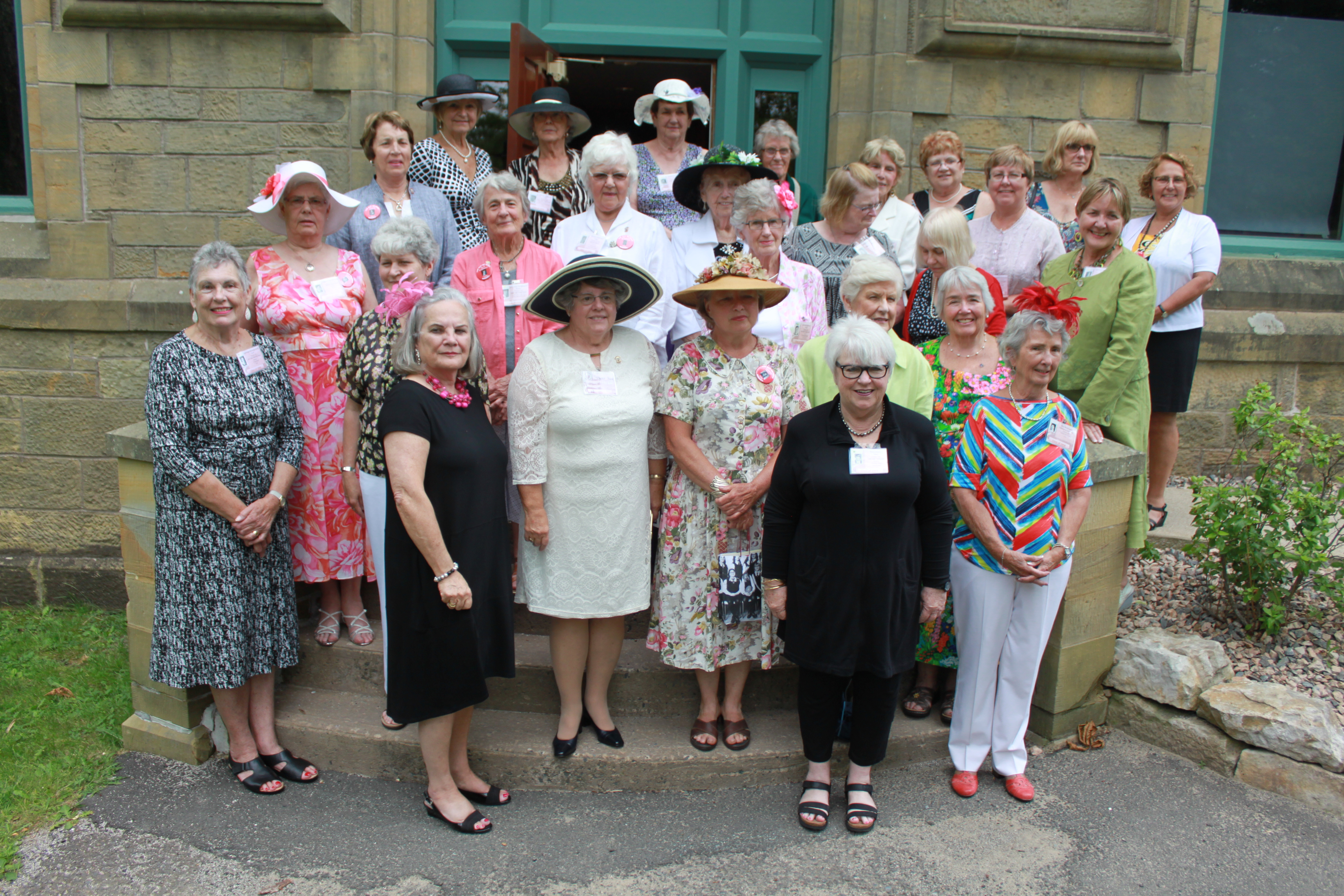

== Notable alumni ==
=== Teachers ===
- Sir Charles G.D. Roberts
- Sir Graham Day
- Steven Laffoley

=== Students ===
• Mae Batherson

- David Andrews
- Ruth Archibald
- Robert Christie (Quebec Politician)
- George Cooper, C.M., C.D., Q.C.
- Bruce Curtis
- Amor De Cosmos
- Muriel Denison
- Robert B. Dickey
- Dorothy Harley Eber
- Fred Fountain
- Joan Fraser
- James Gilbert
- John Hamilton Gray (New Brunswick politician)
- Tiny Hermann
- Gudie Hutchings
- Frederick E. Hyndman
- Andrew Kam
- Basil King
- Leopold David Lewis
- A.A. MacLeod
- Percy Paris
- John Pryor
- Joe Robertson (ice hockey)
- Edward Ross
- Joachim Stroink
- Thomas Suther
- Gordon Tidman
- Peter Whalley
- Austin Willis
- Evan Xie

== See also ==
- Memory NS – Edgehill Fond
- Royal eponyms in Canada
- Education in Canada
- History of Nova Scotia
