= Anna Galvin =

Australian actress

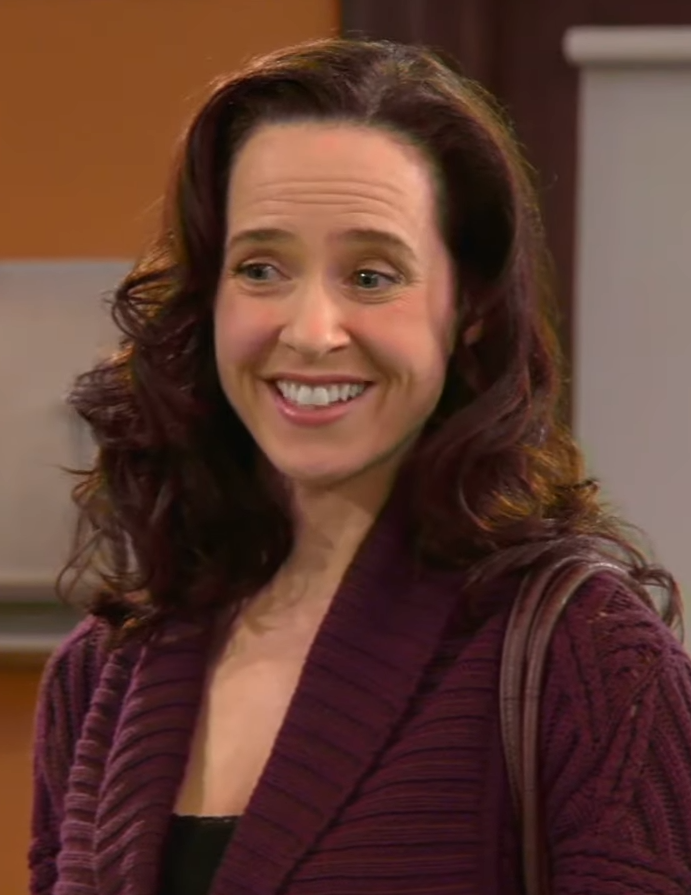
- Galvin as Rachel Young in Mr. Young
- Born: 19 October 1969 (age 56); Australia
- Other name: Anna Glavan
- Occupation: Actress
- Years active: 1994–present
- Spouse: Raul Inglis (m. 2003)
- Children: 1

Anna Galvin (born 19 October 1969; also credited as Anna Glavan) is an Australian actress. She has appeared in several British, American, and Canadian productions.

Her roles include Lex Luthor's assistant, Gina, in Smallville, and Lavender Eyes in Tin Man. She also played Maid Marian in the first season of the TV series The New Adventures of Robin Hood in 1997 and Theodosia in Girl vs. Monster in 2012.

== Personal life ==
Galvin was born 19 October 1969 in Melbourne, Australia, and trained at the Oxford School of Drama in England after graduating from the University of Melbourne.

== Filmography ==
Feature films and television
Year	Title	Role	Notes
1994	Driven	Jessie	TV Short
1994	Scavengers	female android	TV series
1994	Crocodile Shoes	Anabelle Barrett	TV series - Season 1, episode 1 : The Tape
1995	Game On	Julia	TV series - Season 1, episode 1 : Matthew - a Suitable Case for Treatment
1996–1998	The Genie From Down Under	Lady Diana Townes	TV series, 26 episodes
1997	The New Adventures of Robin Hood	Marion Fitzwater	TV series, 13 episodes
1997	Timecop	Anne Thompson	TV series, 1 episode - A Rip in Time
1998	Profiler	Nikki Ware	TV series - Season 3, episode 16 - Lethal Obsession
1998	The Sentinel	Inspector Megan Connor	TV series, 7 episodes
1998	Viper	Mira McKenna	TV series, 1 episode - Wanted: Fred or Alive
1999	Clueless	Michelle	TV series, 1 episode - Parent Trap
1999	Snoops	Susan Cooper	TV series, 1 episode - The Heartless Bitch
2000	Hollywood Off-Ramp	Lucy	TV series, 1 episode - Looking for Mr. Campbell
2000	Once and Again	Female Associate	TV series, 1 episode - Ozymandias 2.0
2001	Family Law	Brenda Gellers	TV series, 1 episode - Film at Eleven
2001	The Beast	Woman	TV series, 1 episode - Travinia: Part 2
2002	Blue Heelers	Natalie Price	TV series, 1 episode - Parenthood
2005	Da Vinci's City Hall	Libby Burton	TV series, 2 episodes
2006	Worst Week of My Life	Vanessa Bradford	TV series, 1 episode - Pilot
2006	Veiled Truth	Janet	TV movie
2006	Stargate SG-1	Dr. Reya Varrick	TV series - Season 9, episode 12 - Collateral Damage
2007	My Baby Is Missing	Dana Hoch	TV movie
2007	Blood Ties	Cheryl	TV series, episode 6 - Love Hurts
2007	Eureka	Dr. Jane Harrington	TV series - Season 2, episode 5 - Duck, Duck Goose
2007	Second Sight	Mary Kaufman	TV movie
2007	Masters of Horror	Dr. Loring	TV series, 1 episode - Right to Die
2007	Smallville	Gina	TV series, 7 episodes
2007	Tin Man	Lavender eyes	TV series, 3 episodes
2007	Vice	Gwen	
2008	Kyle XY	Constance Berlinger	TV series - Season 2, episode 17 - Grounded
2008	Supernatural	Mrs. Fremont, Colette	TV series - Season 3, episode 16 - No Rest for the Wicked Credited as Anna Glavan
2008	The Andromeda Strain	Lisa Stone	TV series
2008	Stargate Atlantis	Vanessa Conrad	TV series - Season 5, episode 15 - Remnants
2008	The Secret Lives of Second Wives	Claire	TV movie
2009	Messages Deleted	Lisa Kwan	
2009	Caprica	Shannon Adama	TV series - Season 1, episode 1 - Pilot
2009	Defying Gravity	Tara Harding	TV series - Season 1, episode 10 - Deja Vu
2009	Stargate Universe	Mrs. Armstrong	TV series - 4 episodes
2010	Transparency	Doctor Ernhart	
2010	The Boy Who Cried Werewolf	Ms. Carlsberg	
2011–2013	Mr. Young	Rachel Young	TV series - 18 episodes
2012	Girl vs. Monster	Theadosia	TV movie
2014	Way of the Wicked	Laura	
2014	Barbie and the Secret Door	Queen Adrienne	voice
2015	Once Upon a Time	Madeline De Vil	TV series - Season 4, episode 19 - "Sympathy for the De Vil"
2016	Warcraft	Draka	
2017	Rufus-2	Kat Elder	TV movie
2017–2018	Loudermilk	Jane Wilkes	4 episodes
2019	Ruby Herring Mysteries: Silent Witness	Ellie Bluth	TV movie
2019	Unspeakable	Dr. Kim Matthews	6 episodes
2019	Van Helsing	Avery	2 episodes
2020	Crimson Point	Gail	post-production
