= Dating Dead Men =

2004 crime novel by Harley Jane Kozak

- First edition
- Author: Harley Jane Kozak
- Genre: Mystery fiction, Humour, Thriller
- Published: 2004
- Publisher: Doubleday
- Pages: 336
- Awards: Anthony Award for Best First Novel (2005)
- ISBN: 978-0-385-51018-9
- Website: Dating Dead Men

Dating Dead Men is a book written by Harley Jane Kozak and published by Doubleday on 20 January 2004, which later went on to win the Anthony Award for Best First Novel in 2005.
