= My Baby Is Missing =

- Written by: Don Nelson
- Directed by: Neill Fearnley
- Starring: Gina Philips; Warren Christie; Ellie Harvie
- Countries of origin: Canada; United States

Production
- Running time: 90 mins

Original release
- Network: Lifetime
- Release: March 4, 2007

My Baby Is Missing is a made-for-television film which aired on Lifetime in 2007, and stars Gina Philips as a career-driven woman determined to prove that her newborn baby was not stillborn, but stolen and sold.

== Plot ==
A successful career woman, Jenna is preparing to go on maternity leave when her doctor advises her to go on bed-rest. Her pregnancy care will then involve a nurse who will complete home visits in order to check on her. When a seemingly pleasant nurse, Lynn Mallory (Ellie Harvie) arrives, she gives Jenna some new vitamins...which knock her out.

Jenna awakens in the hospital to see Tom Robbins (Warren Christie). He is the father of her baby, whom she had named Madeline, but he hadn't even known she was pregnant. A doctor comes in and, to her disbelief, breaks it to her that Madeline was stillborn. Then a police detective arrives with the theory that Madeline has been murdered: the "vitamins" were something to start labor, and that Jenna murdered her baby to protect her career. Remembering that Lynn Mallory had administered the pills, Jenna asks to speak to her. She becomes suspicious when she is informed that there's no Lynn Mallory at the hospital, and when she is told that her child's remains were cremated, she suspects that Lynn stole her baby. Jenna and Tom are determined to discover what happened to Madeline. They embark on a second chance at romance, which leads them to a baby-broker connected to Lynn.

== Cast ==
- Gina Philips as Jenna Davis
- Warren Christie as Tom Robbins
- Ellie Harvie as Nicole/Lynn Mallory
- Jay Brazeau as Dolan Severs
- Peter Bryant as Detective Reese
- Wanda Cannon as Dale Pendergast
- Brad Shivon as Benedix
- Nathalie Therriault as Maggie Carter
- Anna Galvin as Dana Hoch

== Release ==
The film was released on DVD in Australia under the title Stolen Innocence on 7 January 2010.
