= Ellie Harvie =

Canadian actress (born 1965)

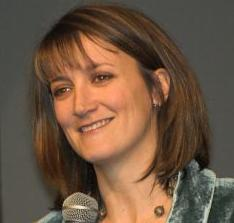
- Harvie at Wolf Pegasus One, London, 2006
- Born: Elinor Anne Harvie; April 7, 1965 (age 61); Belleville, Ontario, Canada
- Occupation: Actress
- Years active: 1991–present

Elinor Anne Harvie (born April 7, 1965) is a Canadian actress. She is best known for portraying Morticia in The New Addams Family and Dr. Lindsey Novak in Stargate SG-1 and Stargate Atlantis.

== Early life and career ==
Harvie was the youngest of five children born into a Canadian Air Force family. They eventually settled in Prince Albert, Saskatchewan. Harvie later attended the University of Manitoba, where she earned a degree in political studies. After graduating, Harvie moved to Vancouver with her family in 1987, where she took up a two-year course at the Vancouver Playhouse Theatre School.

Her love of stand-up comedy and improv led to extra work in TheatreSports. After training at the Vancouver Playhouse Acting School, Harvie embarked on years of theatre touring British Columbia's schools with "Greenthumb Theatre", performing in scads of Fringe Festivals and then the big stages.

As part of the Vancouver TheatreSports team, Harvie won the 1995 Just for Laughs Improv Tournament championship held in Montreal, beating competitors from across the world.

Harvie also appeared in Cupid, The X-Files, Nightscream and The 6th Day. She received a gold medal in CBC's 1998 Improv Olympics and a Gemini nomination for Best Comedy Performance in a series or Special. She also took over from Wendie Malick as Burdine Maxwell from the second TV season of Bratz.

She portrayed Candace/Mrs. Bubkes on the YTV teen comedy series, Some Assembly Required.

On November 24, 2012, Harvie hosted the inaugural UBCP/ACTRA Awards, which honours acting talent in British Columbia.

Harvie has also starred as Lillian Tibbett on Hallmark Movies & Mysteries Channel Series An Aurora Teagarden Mystery Series (2015–2022).

== Filmography ==
- Never Kiss A Man In A Christmas Sweater (2020 TV Film) as Colonel Morrison
- Pup Academy (2019) (voice) as Headmistress Gruff
- Aurora Teagarden Mysteries (2015-2022 TV Film Series) as Lillian Tibbett
- Some Assembly Required (2014-2016) as Candace
- Home Alone: The Holiday Heist (2012) as Catherine Baxter
- Tooth Fairy (2010) as Permit Woman
- Santa Buddies (2009) (V) (as Ellie Harvey) as Pete's Mom
- Love Happens (2009) as Martha
- I Love You, Beth Cooper (2009) as Female Cop at High School
- Space Buddies (2009) (V) as Pete's Mom
- Sanctuary as Eleanor (1 TV episode); in Sanctuary for All: Part 1 (2008)
- The Valet (2008) as the Restaurant Manager
- Gym Teacher: The Movie (2008) (TV) as Ms. Schoenborn
- Space Chimps (2008) (voice) as Additional Voices
- Robson Arms as Female Contractor (1 TV episode); in Trixie's Honour (2008)
- The Triple Eight as Opportunistic Businesswoman (1 TV episode); in Heil Filters
- The Troop (2008) TV series as Charlotte Collins (unknown episodes)
- Tom and Jerry Tales (2008) TV series as Rhino Mother
- Love Notes (2007) (TV) as Claire
- Blood Ties as Rachel (1 TV episode); in Post Partum (2007) TV episode as Rachel
- My Baby Is Missing (2007) (TV) as Nicole/Lynne
- Psych as Lorraine (1 TV episode)’ in He Loves Me, He Loves Me Not, He Loves Me, Oops He's Dead (2007)
- Men in Trees as Clerk (1 TV episode); in Take It Like a Man (2007)
- Christmas on Chestnut Street (2006) (TV) as Eileen Goldberg
- The Mermaid Chair (2006) (TV) as Benne
- Not My Life (2006) (TV) as Janet
- The L Word as Janice (2 TV episodes); in Lifesize (2006) & Lost Weekend (2006)
- The Collector as Meter Maid / The Devil (1 TV episode); in The V.J. (2006)
- The Foursome (2006) as Peggy Spencer
- Firehouse Tales (2005) as Additional Voices
- Stargate: Atlantis as Dr. Lindsey Novak (2 TV episodes); in Critical Mass (2005) & The Siege: Part 3 (2005)
- Terminal City as Alice (6 TV episodes); in Episode * 1.7, Episode * 1.6, Episode * 1.5, Episode * 1.4, Episode * 1.3, & 1 more
- Company Man (2005)
- RoundTable (1 TV episode); in Bad Gigs (2005) TV episode
- Alien Racers (2005) TV series as Gamekeeper Kytani (Episodes 1-26)
- Stargate SG-1 as Dr. Lindsey Novak (1 TV episode); in Prometheus Unbound (2004)
- Jiminy Glick in Lalawood (2004) as June
- The Dead Zone as Pam Tanowitz (1 TV episode); in Speak Now (2004)
- The Wild Guys (2004) as Carla
- The Chris Isaak Show as Stella (1 TV episode); in Taking Off (2004)
- Miracle (2004) as Margie
- Romeo! as Ms. Guthrie (1 TV episode); in Nuthin But Net
- K-9: P.I. (2002) (V) (as Ellie Harvey) as Jackie Von Jarvis
- The Western Alienation Comedy Hour (2002) (TV) as Sketch Comedian
- Andromeda (1 TV episode); in Tunnel at the End of the Light (2002)
- JAG as Realtor (1 TV episode); in Port Chicago (2002)
- Cold Squad as Shelley Mack (2 TV episodes); in Ambleton (2002), & Enough Is Enough (2002)
- Croon (2002) (TV) as Ellie
- The Sports Pages (2001) (TV) as Melinda (segment "The Heidi Bowl")
- Da Vinci's Inquest as Jessica (1 TV episode); in All Tricked Up (2000)
- Improv Comedy Games (2000) TV mini-series as Comedian
- The 6th Day (2000) as Rosie
- P.R. (2000) TV series as Jill Hayes (unknown episodes)
- So Weird as Dr. Daily (1 TV episode); in Shelter (2000)
- Mentors as Cleopatra (1 TV episode); in The Crush (2000)
- Up, Up, and Away! (2000) (TV) as The Annihilator
- First Wave as Marianne (1 TV episode); in All About Eddie (1999)
- Beggars and Choosers (1 TV episode); in Always Leave 'Em Laughing (1999)
- The New Addams Family as Morticia Addams (65 episodes)
- Cupid as Brassy redhead (1 TV episode); in Pilot (1998)
- Someone to Love Me (1998) (TV) as Ms. Krasne
- Wrongfully Accused (1998) as Ruth the News Anchor
- The Improv Comedy Olympics (1998) (TV) as Comedian
- Principal Takes a Holiday (1998) (TV) as Miss W. Fassle
- Joe Finds Grace (2017) as Eva
- Mr. Magoo (1997) (scenes deleted)
- Police Academy: The Series as Hazel Mullins (1 TV episode); in All at Sea (1997)
- The Accident: A Moment of Truth Movie (1997) (TV) as English Teacher
- Poltergeist: The Legacy as Laura DuMond (2 TV episodes); in Lives in the Balance (1997), & Transference (1997) TV episode as Mary Pastor
- NightScream (1997) (TV) as Jenny Marks
- Exception to the Rule (1997) as Secretary
- Super Dave's All Stars (1997) TV series as Cheerleader (unknown episodes)
- Dog's Best Friend (1997) (TV) as Miss Melrose
- The X-Files as OPO Staffer / Ticket Agent (2 TV episodes); in "Hell Money" (1996), & "E.B.E." (1994) (uncredited) as the Ticket Agent
- Happy Gilmore (1996) as Registrar
- Live TV (1996)
- Channel 92 (1995) (TV) as Maxine
- The Commish as Jenny Day (1 TV episode); in The Sharp Pinch (1993)
- Christmas on Division Street (1991) (TV) as Nurse
