= Living Out Loud =

- Theatrical release poster
- Directed by: Richard LaGravenese
- Written by: Richard LaGravenese
- Produced by: Danny DeVito; Michael Shamberg; Stacey Sher
- Starring: Holly Hunter; Danny DeVito; Queen Latifah; Martin Donovan
- Cinematography: John Bailey
- Edited by: Jon Gregory; Lynzee Klingman
- Music by: George Fenton
- Production company: Jersey Films
- Distributed by: New Line Cinema
- Release dates: September 15, 1998 (TIFF); October 14, 1998 (Hamptons Film Festival); October 30, 1998 (United States)
- Running time: 100 minutes
- Country: United States
- Language: English
- Budget: $20 million
- Box office: $15.6 million

Living Out Loud is a 1998 American comedy-drama film written and directed by Richard LaGravenese and set in New York City, starring Holly Hunter, Danny DeVito, Queen Latifah, Martin Donovan, and Elias Koteas.

Living Out Loud premiered at the Toronto International Film Festival on September 15, 1998, and later the Hamptons Film Festival on October 14, 1998 before being released by New Line Cinema on October 30, 1998. The film received mixed reviews from critics and underperformed at the box office, grossing $15.6 million against a $20 million budget.

== Plot ==
Judith Moore confronts her husband Bob at dinner over his infidelity, which he initially denies. Her best friend Ann's husband Teddy saw them together. Bob had his arm around her, they'd said hello and he told a joke. Bob eventually admits she's a 34-year-old pediatrician.

Depressed, she holes up in her apartment, where the middle-aged Pat Francato is the building superintendent and elevator operator. He is as lonely as she is as his wife left him, and he's beset with gambling problems. As they aren't together, he secretly checks up on their daughter in the hospital.

Judith works as a private carer for a wealthy, elderly woman. When asked about her personal life, she tells her about the 16-year-marriage, and remembers Bob's insistence on not wanting children.

At first, Judith had thought they had a perfect marriage, with both her and Bob studying to be doctors. But after she puts her studies on hold to find a job and support them, over 20 years pass until suddenly he leaves Judith to be with another doctor.

Judith and Pat make a connection. Initially, she helps by loaning him cash to pay off a debt. Pat's brother gives him enough to return it plus get a nice bottle of wine Judith insists on sharing with him.

Judith, after she heckles a woman's singing in the nightclub, gets pulled aside by the jazz singer Liz Bailey. She tell her she loves her voice and she has her record, but was brushed off by her a week prior when she tried to tell her so. Then, the drunk Judith both tells Liz her boyfriend's gay, but also about a random encounter she'd had there a week ago.

Judith returns home drunk, is very unfriendly to Pat and soon she calls over a man who gives erotic massages. Two and a half hours later, she goes downstairs to apologize. Before Pat can propose they pursue a romantic relationship, Judith cuts him off as she sees their connection only as a friendship.

As Judith's got insomnia, Pat accompanies her until she falls asleep. The next evening they go to the club although he's been forewarned that she'll never have feelings for him. Judith introduces Pat to Liz, who she's become friends with, and her 'boyfriend' Gary. Later on, she confirms he's gay, but she enjoys his company as he's got sensibilities, a gentle kindness, more similar to women.

Liz takes Judith to an after hours women's dance club, giving her a pill so she loses her inhibitions. She stays out all night and in the morning goes to the sale of her and Bob's house outside of the city. They inevitably fight, and Judith scares him enough in front of his lawyer to warrant him to pressure her to forfeit her share of the profits to avoid jail time.

Judith tells Pat, who suggests they go out for a meal and the club. Another evening, they go out for dinner and he gives her his news of starting an Italian food import business. When Pat surprises Judith with airline tickets to Italy, she declines.

Months later, Judith is working in the hospital's neo-natal unit and has just done her nursing certification exam. That night, she goes to Liz's club and watches Pat sing. Judith momentarily fantasizes about grabbing him and kissing him passionately. However, she then sees Pat is with another woman.

Judith strolls home alone, contentedly.

== Cast ==
- Holly Hunter as Judith Moore
- Danny DeVito as Pat Francato
- Queen Latifah as Liz Bailey
- Martin Donovan as Robert Nelson
- Elias Koteas as The Kisser
- Richard Schiff as Philly Francato
- Mariangela Pino as Donna
- Suzanne Shepherd as Mary
- Eddie Cibrian as The Masseur
- Tamlyn Tomita as Mrs. Nelson
- Gina Philips as Lisa Francato
- Carole Ruggier as Italian Girlfriend
- Rachael Leigh Cook as Teenage Judith
- Jenette Goldstein as Fanny
- Lin Shaye as Lisa's Nurse
- Carmit Bachar as Dancer

== Production ==
Eddie Cibrian said the scene where he gives Holly Hunter a sensual massage wasn't nerve-wracking. "She's so good. Working with someone like that is just a phenomenal opportunity. And she made me feel so comfortable that you just get lost in the scene. You just forget about the cameras and everything else, and that's when good things happen," he said.

== Reception ==
Living Out Loud received mixed reviews from critics. On Rotten Tomatoes, the film has an approval rating of 59% rating based on 34 reviews, with an average rating of 6.4/10. The site's consensus states: "Unoriginal, with one-dimensional characters." On Metacritic, the film has a weighted average score of 64/100 based on reviews from 23 critics, indicating "generally favorable" reviews. Audiences surveyed by CinemaScore gave the film a grade "B−" on scale of A to F.

Roger Ebert of the Chicago Sun-Times gave the film three and a half stars and wrote that he enjoyed that the movie provided "the comfort of these lives flowing briefly in the same stream. The sense that the unexpected was free to enter the story, and would not be shouldered aside by the demands of conventional plotting." Ebert gave particular praise to writer and director Richard LaGravenese, who he wrote is "more interested in characters and dialogue than in shaping everything into a conventional story. He aims for the kind of bittersweet open ends that life itself so often supplies; he doesn't hammer his square pegs into round holes." Mark Caro of the Chicago Tribune also gave the film a positive review, but noted that the "story also has a tendency to wander, which enhances the slice-of-life feel but at the expense of the movie feeling fully formed." The New York Times critic Janet Maslin was less favorable, writing that LaGravenese "has borrowed from Chekhov the soul-baring introspection that can be so ineffable on the page or stage yet becomes so damply sensitive and dramatically vague on the screen" and, in describing some of the "wild flights of fancy springing from Judith's imagination," observed that "free-spirited as the film hopes to be, it can't easily reconcile such flamboyant departures with an otherwise static pace." Maslin credited Latifah as the film's "one big saving grace," and also offered praise for DeVito for "turning Pat into a three-dimensional figure and singing They Can't Take That Away from Me with brio on the nightclub's amateur night."
