= Unforgivable (1996 film) =

- Written by: Dan Levine; A.R. Simoun
- Directed by: Graeme Campbell
- Starring: John Ritter; Harley Jane Kozak
- Music by: Roger Bellon
- Country of origin: United States
- Original language: English

Production
- Producers: Jack Grossbart; Joan Barnett
- Editor: Paul Martin Smith
- Running time: 95 minutes

Original release
- Network: CBS
- Release: April 30, 1996

Unforgivable is a 1996 American made-for-television drama film directed by Graeme Campbell and starring John Ritter, Harley Jane Kozak, Gina Philips, Susan Gibney and James McDaniel. The film premiered on April 30, 1996 on CBS.

Though the film received little to no critical acclaim, John Ritter was praised for his performance as an abusive husband and graduating from his best known role as the lovable Jack Tripper on Three's Company.

== Plot ==
Paul Hegstrom is a ferociously violent man, and is a top salesman at a car dealership. Paul's wife of 17 years, Judy, is a homemaker. They have three children, Tammy, Jeff, and Heidi. Judy called Paul at work, after he told her to check in with him, but he was with a client, and her call cost him a sale. Judy sits on the floor in their bedroom, with a bruised and bloody face, amongst glass shards, apologizing to Paul. Paul's light colored button down shirt has visible blood stains at the wrists, as he washes his hands, and fixes a compress for Judy, and professes his love for her.

The next morning, as the kids get ready for school, it is made clear that the Hegstrom's oldest daughter, the high-school-aged Tammy, is fully aware of the abuse that happens and she does not buy in to any cover-up excuses. Paul is also having an affair with Beth French, the owner of a local bar he frequents with his coworkers. Beth tries to break it off with Paul because he won't leave his wife and kids. Paul goes home that evening and starts in on Judy when Tammy comes into the kitchen and confronts him. Tammy begins to call the police, and Paul throws her into a wall and she hits her head. Paul storms out of the house, noticing his other children hiding. He goes to Beth's house and lies to her about leaving Judy. At work, Paul is in a sales slump and snaps when his boss, Tom, tries to discuss it, and the personal problems he's been having lately.

Paul's rage continues to escalate when Beth asks about the status of his divorce. At work, Paul has a shouting match in Tom's office over a deal he handled incorrectly, and Paul is fired. Judy is served with divorce papers. Paul gets a job at another car dealership, and quits shortly after, having gotten into argument with his boss. After getting drunk at a bar, Paul goes to Judy's house and is arrested after they refuse to let him in. Beth is tipped off by several people about what occurred that evening, and tries to throw him out of her house, and he beats her. As she tries to get away, she is thrown through a glass shower door, causing her to need several hundred stitches and treatment for broken bones.

The DA office is pushing to file attempted murder charges against Paul, but Beth agrees not to file charges against him if he joins and completes a group counseling program for domestic violence offenders. Beth's other condition is that he gets out of her life. At the group session, Paul has trouble relating to the other men in the group, thinking he is not like them, and that his issues are not as serious as theirs. One night, the other men in the group confront Paul about his behavior and he storms out, and he is warned that if he leaves, he cannot come back. Paul destroys his apartment and nearly attempts suicide.

Realizing the group is his only chance to salvage what little life he has left, he begs the group to let him back in, and they do. Paul's father was abusive alcoholic and he passed on his abusive behavior to him. A year later, Paul approaches Judy about seeing the kids after not having seen them the whole time. Paul got his life together and got a new job in the car lot. Jeff and Heidi agree to see him, but Tammy refuses. Paul graduates from the program, and Judy, Jeff, and Heidi attend the ceremony, where he gives a speech about breaking the cycle. They continue to spend time together as a family, with the exception of Tammy. It is revealed that Paul and Judy eventually remarried and opened treatment centers for men who batter women in the United States, and, as of the date of the film, Tammy had never fully reconciled with her father.

== Cast ==
- John Ritter as Paul Hegstrom
- Harley Jane Kozak as Judy Hegstrom
- Gina Philips as Tammy Hegstrom
- Aaron Leigh as Jeff Hegstrom
- Elisabeth Lund as Heidi Hegstrom
- Susan Gibney as Beth French
- Kevin Dunn as Milton "Milt" Stella
- James McDaniel as Spider
- Mariangela Pino as Helen Jessup

== Production ==
Parts of the film were shot in Salt Lake City, Utah.

== Legacy ==
The real life Paul and Judy Hegstrom had been remarried for 34 years, at the time of his passing on April 27, 2017, after being divorced for 7 years.
