= Born Too Soon =

1993 American television film

- Genre: Drama
- Based on: Born Too Soon by Elizabeth Mehren
- Screenplay by: Susan Baskin
- Directed by: Noel Nosseck
- Starring: Michael Moriarty; Pamela Reed
- Theme music composer: Mark Snow
- Country of origin: United States
- Original language: English

Production
- Executive producer: Robert M. Myman
- Producer: R. W. Goodwin
- Production location: Vancouver
- Cinematography: Frank Beascoechea
- Editor: Robert F. Shugrue
- Running time: 95 minutes
- Production company: Adam Productions

Original release
- Network: NBC
- Release: April 25, 1993

Born Too Soon is a 1993 American television film about the life of Emily Butterfield, a baby girl who was born prematurely and died 53 days after her birth. The film stars Michael Moriarty and Pamela Reed as Emily's parents, Fox Butterfield and Elizabeth Mehren. It is based on Mehren's 1991 non-fiction book of the same name.

== Cast ==
- Michael Moriarty as Fox Butterfield
- Pamela Reed as Elizabeth Mehren
- Terry O'Quinn as Dr. Friedman
- Joanna Gleason as Annemarie
- Mariangela Pino as Leslie
- Elizabeth Ruscio as Dr. Jane Gerstner
- Tina Lifford as Latanya
- Christianne Hirt as Carol
- Christine Avila as Mrs. Diaz
- Dennis Redfield as Tom
- Jay Brazeau as Dr. Wolf

== Production ==
The film was shot in Vancouver.

== Reception ==
David Parkinson of Radio Times awarded the film three stars out of five. Ken Tucker of Entertainment Weekly graded the film a B+.

The film received positive feedback from Butterfield and Mehren.
