= The Sickhouse =

- Directed by: Curtis Radclyffe
- Written by: Romla Walker
- Produced by: Charlotte Wontner and Shripal Morakhia
- Starring: Gina Philips; Alex Hassell; Kellie Shirley; Andrew Knott
- Edited by: Joe Pisani and Kate Evans
- Music by: Richard Fox and Lauren Yason
- Release date: 18 March 2008
- Running time: 100 minutes
- Country: United Kingdom
- Language: English

The Sickhouse is a 2008 horror film, directed by Curtis Radclyffe, produced by Charlotte Wontner and starring Gina Philips, Kellie Shirley and Alex Hassell.

== Plot ==
Anna is an ambitious young archaeologist who desperately needs the kudos of an important find, but her work is ruined when the authorities suddenly shut down the old hospital in which she is working. Plague spores contaminate its medieval foundations. Anna is convinced that this ancient plague site holds an even darker secret. In her research she has stumbled on a murderous pattern of unexplained child deaths. This is a very cold case; the children disappeared in 1665, the year of the Great Plague. The 'suits' at her museum don't buy her theories and they give the approval for the hospital's imminent demolition. That night Anna risks everything, and breaks back into the hospital to prove her suspicions.

Reaching for a mysterious ancient artifact, she slips and falls. Meanwhile, Nick's 21st birthday celebrations are culminating in chaos. He just wanted a good night out with girlfriend Joolz, best mate Steve, and Steve's younger brother, Clive. But a little innocent joy-riding goes badly wrong. After a fatal hit-and-run the teenagers hide out in the hospital and their fates become intertwined with Anna's. With luckless synchronicity, two worlds collide and the ancient force that has snared the young people starts to play out its cruel game. Anna has unwittingly resurrected the malevolent spirit of a hideous medieval plague doctor, and one by one they will all encounter his evil reincarnation - their fates mirroring the cruel deaths of his victims 350 years ago. History is repeating itself.

Anna works against the clock to unlock the secrets of the murderous plague doctor. In a twisted version of Alice Through The Looking Glass, the young people find themselves fighting for their lives - and souls - in a long-forgotten medieval underworld. The only way out is for Anna to confront the plague doctor. Can she destroy him, and stop his evil spreading like a plague epidemic, into today's world? A shocking mystery that began centuries ago needs solving but even Anna cannot see that she herself is the final piece of the puzzle. Time is her enemy and death is only the beginning.

== Cast ==
- Gina Philips as Anna
- Alex Hassell as Nick
- Kellie Shirley as Joolz
- Andrew Knott as Steve
- Jack Bailey as Clive
- John Lebar as the Plague Doctor
- Romla Walker as Professor Joan Holland
- Tom Wontner as Frank
- Gregg Harris as Dave
- Abe Buckoke as the Ragged Boy
