= Nico the Unicorn =

- Front cover
- Author: Frank Sacks
- Language: English
- Genre: Juvenile fiction
- Publisher: Tom Doherty Associates
- Publication date: 1996
- Pages: 154
- ISBN: 978-0-8125-5171-6
- OCLC: 35819782

Nico the Unicorn is the name of a 1996 juvenile fiction book and its 1998 film adaptation. The book was written by Frank Sacks; he also wrote the screenplay for the film, which was directed by Graeme Campbell.

== Book ==
The book was written by Frank Sacks and first published by Tom Doherty Associates in 1996 with the front cover art by David Gaadt. Sacks is a writer and film producer and Nico the Unicorn was his first novel intended for children.

=== Plot ===
After the accident which resulted in his leg being injured. Billy visits the Starlight Circus. There he meets and buys a pony who gives birth to a unicorn whom he names Nico. Later the pony gets killed by a mountain lion and Billy has to do what he can with his secret to protect his new friend.

=== Characters ===
- Billy – The Protagonist whose leg gets injured by a drunken driver.
- Nico – Billy's magical unicorn.
- The Pony – Nico's mother.
- Bruce – The bully who always calls Billy a gimp.
- Julie – Billy's mother.
- Carolyn – Billy's friend who lets slip about Nico to Bruce and his gang.

== Film ==
Nico the Unicorn
- Directed by: Graeme Campbell
- Screenplay by: Frank Sacks
- Based on: Nico the Unicorn by Frank Sacks
- Produced by: Pieter Kroonenberg
- Cinematography: Walter Bal
- Edited by: Jean Beaudoin
- Music by: Alan Reeves
- Production company: Kingsborough Greenlight Pictures
- Distributed by: Screen Media Ventures (2000); Moonstone Entertainment (2010)
- Release dates: 1999 (video, Canada); 14 August 2001 (video, US)
- Running time: 90 minutes
- Countries: Canada; United States
- Language: English

The film was directed by Graeme Campbell based on a screenplay by Frank Sacks, who authored the book. Filming took place around Canada's Eastern Townships and Montreal. The Canadian production was released in 1998. It was originally set to be distributed by CineTel Films but the distribution rights were later sold to Moonstone Entertainment.

=== Cast ===
- Anne Archer as Julie Hastings
- Michael Ontkean as Tom Gentry
- Kevin Zegers as Billy Hastings
- Pierre Chagnon as Ben Willett
- Elisha Cuthbert as Carolyn Price

=== Plot ===
Billy and his mother moved from Boston to rural Vermont after a car accident which left Billy fatherless and with a fractured leg. Billy has a hard time adjusting to life in Vermont and has trouble making friends. While shopping at the mall after school one day, Billy stumbles upon a ramshackle petting zoo, where the animals are kept in poor conditions. After seeing a small pony with a horn taped to its head and finding out that it is about to be sold for slaughter, Billy instead makes a deal with the zoo keeper and buys the pony. Once Billy takes the pony home, he cleans her up and cares for her. The pony appears to be pregnant and eventually foals, under the watchful eye of Billy and his friend Carolyn. The pony's foal grows a horn and turns out to be a unicorn, who grows at a tremendous rate. Billy names him Nico from the letters found in the word "unicorn".

One day, while Billy is at school, a hungry mountain lion, searching for food, comes to attack the pony and Nico in the stable. The pony sacrifices herself for the well-being of Nico, and she is then killed (and potentially eaten off-screen) by the mountain lion. Billy and his mother later bury the pony on their land. That night, magic descends upon the stable, and in the morning, Billy discovers that Nico has become fully grown. Carolyn visits later in the day and tells Billy that he could charge people to see Nico and help his mother, Julie, earn money for her to go to school. Billy is annoyed at this and he and Carolyn argue making Carolyn storm off back into town, where she meets Bruce and Mark who make fun of Billy for saying he has a unicorn. Carolyn, defends Billy by telling them she has seen Nico, before quickly denying it when Bruce becomes too interested. The group doesn't believe Carolyn, but decides to pull a hoax instead for the paper, and plan to take a picture of Nico with a fake horn. They make an offer with the local news reporter Cecil who is looking for a big story, that if they provide proof of a unicorn, Cecil will pay them a hundred thousand dollars. Cecil agrees thinking they are making it up.

Meanwhile, Carolyn has cycled on ahead to warn Billy, who immediately packs his bag to take Nico to safety up on Big Rock at the top of a dangerous mountain. Bruce and friends arrive before he leaves, and ask Billy where Nico is, when Billy refuses to say Bruce pushes Billy down, and Nico comes out of the bushes and goes to attack Bruce. Bruce panics crying out for Billy to help which Billy does, before Bruce and Mark take pictures of Nico and run away. Billy decides now that he has to take Nico away before people take Nico away from him, and tells Carolyn to tell his mother where Billy has gone. Bruce manages to convince Cecil with the photos of Nico, who immediately calls 'his people', Cecil also tells the owner of the diner, Joe and it is also where Billy's mother works, Julie hears about the story and goes home where Carolyn tells her where Billy has gone, worried about Billy's leg and his safety Julie sets out after him on Carolyn's bike. By now the local police are involved too, led by Julie's boyfriend, Deputy Pete, who are more focused on rescuing Julie and Billy from the dangerous mountain.

Having not gotten very far, Julie soon catches up to Billy, who is discarding his leg cast so he can ride Nico bareback, something that could confine him to a wheelchair if he has a bad fall. Billy pleads with his mother to give him a chance, and to lead the police away from him. Eventually Julie agrees and leaves back down the mountain where she meets with the police, who are prepared to search the mountain by horseback, Julie tells them she knows where Billy is and leads them in the wrong direction until Carolyn, who does not know that Billy asked Julie to lead them astray, says she has never been to Big Rock which is where Billy is going. Julie confesses to leading them the wrong way and the whole group turn around.

With his mother leading the others away, Billy eventually reaches the top of Big Rock where he and Nico are stuck at the edge of a cliff, behind him a news helicopter lands to take pictures, and Billy and Nico flee but before they can escape, the police, Julie and Carolyn arrive on their horses. Nico turns and runs toward the cliff before jumping and flies over the gap and lands on the other side. On the other side is a desert like terrain where Nico takes Billy inside a cave, he dismounts Nico and finds cave drawings of unicorns on the walls, when there is a gold glowing light which takes Nico and Billy to a paradise like land, where Nico lives and Billy's leg is healed, enabling him to walk and run properly again. Whilst taking a drink from the water there, Billy sees his mother's sad face in the reflection and knows he has to go back, he says goodbye to Nico for the final time before he goes back through the cave, where his mother and everyone is waiting for him on the desert terrain, having flown over in the helicopter. Billy hugs his mother and Cecil, with a camera, interrogates him about the unicorn to which Billy looks straight into the camera and says, "What unicorn? Everyone knows unicorns don't exist." Leaving Cecil storyless and returning home with his healed leg and mother.

=== Reception ===
Mark Deming called the film "heart-warming" for The New York Times. The Dove Foundation found it to be a charming family movie. Renee Schonfeld at Common Sense Media wrote that it was a likeable story with good messages and role models, but cautioned that some scenes might be intense for animal-loving children.

== See also ==
- List of films about horses
