= Harley Jane Kozak =

American actress and author

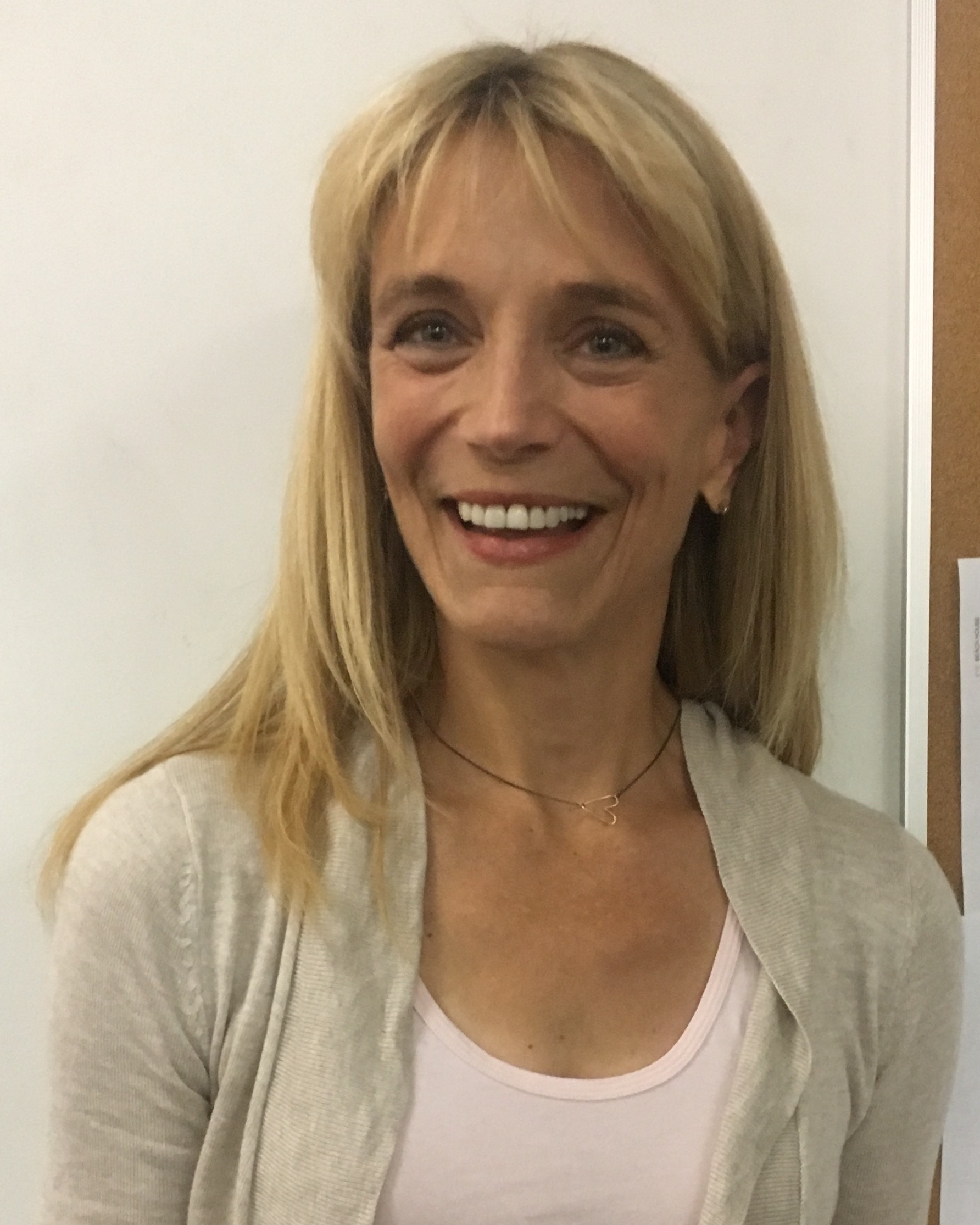
- Kozak in 2018
- Born: Susan Jane Kozak; January 28, 1957 (age 69); Wilkes-Barre, Pennsylvania, U.S.
- Education: New York University (MFA)
- Occupations: Actress, author
- Years active: 1981–present
- Spouses: Van Santvoord (m. 1982; div. 1983); Gregory Aldisert (m. 1997; div. 2007)
- Children: 3

Harley Jane Kozak (born Susan Jane Kozak; January 28, 1957) is an American actress and author. She made her film debut in the slasher film The House on Sorority Row (1982), and had a role as Mary Duvall on the soap opera Santa Barbara between 1985 and 1986. She later had supporting parts in Clean and Sober (1988) and When Harry Met Sally... (1989), before starring in the major studio films Parenthood (1989) and Arachnophobia (1990).

Kozak continued to act in film throughout the remainder of the 1990s and into the 2000s, but turned her focus to writing. She has published five mystery novels since 2004. Her debut novel, Dating Dead Men, earned her Agatha, Anthony, and Macavity awards.

== Early life ==
Kozak was born Susan Jane Kozak in Wilkes-Barre, Pennsylvania, the youngest of eight children to Dorothy (née Taraldsen), a music teacher, and Joseph Aloysius Kozak, an attorney. Her father died when she was one year old, after which her mother relocated the family to North Dakota. When Kozak was six years old, her mother was hired as a professor at the University of Nebraska–Lincoln. Kozak spent the remainder of her childhood on a farm east of Lincoln.

Kozak attended the University of Nebraska–Lincoln for three semesters before relocating to New York City, where she worked as a waitress for ten years. During this period, she attended New York University's Graduate Acting Program at the Tisch School of the Arts, graduating in 1980. Of her name, Kozak has said that "Harley" came from a former boyfriend, who owned a Harley-Davidson motorcycle, and that she liked the nickname, later having her name legally changed.

== Career ==
=== Acting ===
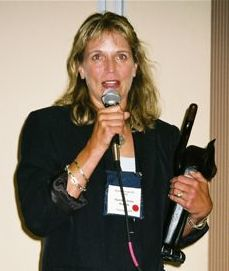
Kozak in 2005

Kozak starred in movies such as The House on Sorority Row (1983), Parenthood (1989), Side Out (1990), Arachnophobia (1990), The Taking of Beverly Hills (1991), Necessary Roughness (1991), All I Want for Christmas (1991), The Favor (1994), Magic in the Water (1995), Unforgivable (1996), and the soap operas Texas (from November 1981 to December 1982 as Brette Wheeler), Guiding Light (from 1983 to 1985 and a one-day voice-over in February 1990, as both Annabelle Sims Reardon and Annabelle's deceased mother, in 1983 flashbacks, Annie Sims) and Santa Barbara (from 1985 to 1986 and again in 1989, as former nun Mary Duvall McCormick).

In Santa Barbara, her character died in an accident where a giant neon letter "C" toppled onto her during an argument atop the Capwell hotel. Viewers were so angry over Mary's death that they started a letter-writing campaign demanding for her reappearance. The show received such a huge number of letters that eventually they admitted their mistake and asked Kozak to come back. She declined the offer since she was already working with other projects and she was proud of the unusual way her character had made her exit. In February 1989, though, she made a brief return as an angel in Heaven. In 1987 Harley received a Soap Opera Digest Award from her role as Mary. In 1993–1994, Kozak played Alison Hart, wife of Dave Hart, portrayed by Beau Bridges, on the CBS comedy/western series Harts of the West.

In 1996, Kozak appeared in the mini-series Titanic along with Peter Gallagher and Catherine Zeta Jones. She played the role of Bess Allison, a mother who dies while searching for her missing baby at the time when RMS Titanic sinks. Kozak was originally chosen to play Karen Sammler in the TV show Once and Again. She filmed the pilot, but was asked to withdraw from the series when she became pregnant with her first child, because they did not want her character to be pregnant. The role went to Susanna Thompson. Also in 1996, Kozak portrayed a battered wife in a made-for-TV movie, Unforgivable, co-starring with John Ritter, and received praise for her "strong" performance. Kozak also appeared in "Cold Lazarus", a first-season episode of Stargate SG-1, as Sara O'Neill.

=== Writing ===
Kozak has written five novels: Dating Dead Men (2004), Dating Is Murder : A Novel (2005), Dead Ex (2007), and A Date You Can't Refuse (2008), all of which feature greeting-card designer and amateur sleuth Wollie Shelley, a woman with very eccentric friends and family. The first three novels were published by Doubleday, a division of Random House, and the most recent was published by Broadway Books following the restructuring of Doubleday. Dating Dead Men won an Agatha Award, an Anthony Award, and a Macavity Award for best first novel. Kozak's fifth book is Keeper of the Moon, a paranormal romantic suspense novel.

== Personal life ==
Kozak lives in Los Angeles. She has been married twice: a brief union in the early 1980s and a second marriage from 1997 until 2007 to entertainment lawyer Gregory Aldisert, with whom she has three children.

== Partial filmography ==
Year	Title	Role	Notes
1981–1982	Texas	Brette Wheeler	TV series
1982	The House on Sorority Row	Diane	
1983–1985	Guiding Light	Annabelle Sims Reardon	TV series
1985–1986	Santa Barbara	Mary Duvall	TV series
1988	Clean and Sober	Ralston Receptionist	
1988–1989	Knightwatch	Barbara 'Babs' Shepard	TV series
1989	When Harry Met Sally...	Helen Hillson	
1989	Parenthood	Susan Buckman	
1990	So Proudly We Hail	Susan McCarran	Television film
1990	Side Out	Kate Jacobs	
1990	Arachnophobia	Molly Jennings	
1991	Necessary Roughness	Dr. Suzanne Carter	
1991	The Taking of Beverly Hills	Laura Sage	
1991	All I Want for Christmas	Catherine O'Fallon	
1993	The Amy Fisher Story	Amy Pagnozzi	
1993–1994	Harts of the West	Alison Hart	TV series
1994	The Favor	Kathy Whiting	
1995	The Android Affair	Karen Garrett	Television film
1995	Magic in the Water	Dr. Wanda Bell	
1995	Charlie Grace	Holly	TV series
1995	Bringing up Jack	Ellen McMahon	TV series
1996	The Nerd	Tanzie Boyd	Television film
1996	Unforgivable	Judy Hegstrom	Television film
1996	A Friend's Betrayal	Abby Hewitt	Television film
1996	Titanic	Bess Allison	Miniseries
1997	Stargate SG-1	Sara O'Neill	TV series
1997	Dark Planet	Brendan	
1997	The Lovemaster	Karen	
1997	The Outer Limits	Prisoner 98843	TV series Episode: The Camp
1997–1998	You Wish	Gillian Apple	TV series
1998	Emma's Wish	Joy Bookman	Television film
2005	I Love the '80s 3-D	Herself	Documentary miniseries; Episode: "1989"
2009	The Red Queen	Church Lady	
2010	Vipers in the Grass	Celia Bowman	Short film
2015	I Spit on Your Grave III: Vengeance Is Mine	Therapist	
2015	A Kind of Magic	Abby	
2018	The Amaranth	Holly	
2019	More Beautiful for Having Been Broken	Vivienne	

== Bibliography ==
=== Wollie Shelley Mysteries ===
#	Title	Publication Date	Publisher	ISBN	Awards
1	Dating Dead Men	2004	Doubleday	ISBN 0-385-51018-7	Macavity Award for Best First Mystery Novel (2005) Anthony Award for Best First Novel (2005) Agatha Award, for Best First Novel (2004)
2	Dating Is Murder: A Novel	2005	Doubleday	ISBN 0-385-51034-9	
3	Dead Ex	2007	Doubleday	ISBN 978-0-385-51802-4	
4	A Date You Can't Refuse	2009	Broadway Books	ISBN 978-1-6075-1960-7	

=== The Keepers, LA ===
Books 0.5, 1, 3 and 4 by Heather Graham Pozzessere

#	Title	Publication Date	Publisher	ISBN
2	Keeper of the Moon	2013	Harlequin	ISBN 978-0-373-88565-7

Book 3 by Alexandra Sokoloff

=== Anthologies ===
Collection or Anthology	Contribution	Publication Date	Publisher	ISBN
Landmarked for Murder		2006	Top Publications	ISBN 1929976372, 9781929976379
Mystery Muses		2006	Crum Creek Press	ISBN 0981863221, 9780981863221
This Is Chick Lit	The Infidelity Diet	2006	BenBella Books	ISBN 1933771011, 9781933771014
A Hell Of A Woman		2007	Busted Flush Press	ISBN 0976715732, 9780976715733
Crimes by Moonllight	Madeeda	2010	Berkley Publishing (ebook)	ISBN 0425235637, 9780425235638
Write Good or Die	NaNoNoNoNoNoMo	2010 2011	Haunted Computer Books Smashwords Edition	
Butcher Knives & Body Counts: Essays On the Formula, Frights, and Fun of the Slasher Film	The House on Sorority Row	2010	Dark Scribe Press	ISBN 0981863221, 9780981863221
Mystery Writers of America Presents The Rich and the Dead	Lamborghini Mommy	2011		ISBN 978-0446555883
For the Sake of the Game: Stories Inspired by the Sherlock Holmes Canon	The Walk-In	2018	Pegasus Books	ISBN 1681778793, 9781681778792
