= Evigan =

Evigan is a surname. Notable people with the surname include:

- Briana Evigan (born 1986), American actress, dancer, singer, songwriter and choreographer
- Greg Evigan (born 1953), American film, stage, and television actor
- Jason Evigan (born 1983), American musician, singer, songwriter and record producer
- Vanessa Lee Evigan (born 1981), American actress
