= The Right Kind of Wrong =

The Right Kind of Wrong may refer to:

- "The Right Kind of Wrong", a song by Diane Warren from Coyote Ugly
- The Right Kind of Wrong, a 2013 Canadian film
