= I Don't Wanna Go =

I Don't Wanna Go may refer to:

- "I Don't Wanna Go", a song by the Moments, later covered by Joey Travolta from his 1978 self-titled album
- "I Don't Wanna Go", a song by Blues Traveler from their 2012 album Suzie Cracks the Whip
- "I Don't Wanna Go", a song by Alan Walker and Julie Bergan from the 2018 album Different World

== See also ==
- Tenth Doctor, an incarnation of The Doctor from Doctor Who, whose last words were "I don't want to go"
