= If This Is Love (Joey Travolta song) =

Single by Joey Travolta
- Released: 1978
- Songwriters: Kerry Chater and Robbie Patton

"If This Is Love" is a song written by Kerry Chater and Robbie Patton which was notably recorded by Joey Travolta for his 1978 debut album Joey Travolta. Issued as a single concurrently with its parent album's release in September 1978, "If This is Love" did not accrue enough popularity to reach the Hot 100 singles chart in the United States, although it did spend six weeks in the 101-150 Singles chart in Record World magazine, peaking at No. 115.

== Other recordings ==
- The song was originally recorded by Tom Jones for his 1977 album What a Night.
- Randy Edelman recorded the song on his 1979 album You're the One.
- Melissa Manchester covered the song for her 1980 album For the Working Girl, and the recording was issued as the album's first single, reaching No. 19 on the Billboard Adult Contemporary chart and No. 102 on the Bubbling Under Hot 100 chart.
