= Arizona Summer =

- Video cover
- Directed by: Joey Travolta
- Written by: William Blair
- Produced by: William Blair; Gaye Gilbert; David Ornston; Jeff Rice; Rich Salvatore; Joey Travolta
- Cinematography: Brian Cox
- Edited by: Kaman
- Music by: Edwin Willmington
- Production company: WestPark Productions
- Distributed by: Skyline West Pictures LLC
- Release date: September 6, 2004 (Hungary)
- Running time: 102 minutes
- Country: United States
- Language: English

Arizona Summer is a 2004 American family film directed by Joey Travolta. The plot is about Brent Butler (Gemini Barnett), a wiser-than-his years youngster described as "Tom Sawyer in the 21st century". The majority of the story takes place at a boys and girls camp owned and operated by Travers (Lee Majors), who has spent a lifetime quietly helping adolescents become confident young adults. In addition to camp activities, adventures, practical jokes, and conflict resolution there is an underlying theme that bolsters the importance of a positive father-son relationship.

Arizona Summer was primarily filmed at Saguaro Lake Ranch in Phoenix, Arizona and was almost titled "Saguaro Ranch Summer". Additional scenes were filmed in Prescott, Arizona.

== Cast ==
- Gemini Barnett as Brent
- Brent Blair as Jack
- Christy Blair as Head Counselor
- Brooke Burgstahler as Christy
- Scott Clifton as Brooke
- Greg Evigan as Rick
- Morgan Fairchild as Debbie
- Bug Hall as Scott
- David Henrie as Bad
- Lorenzo James Henrie as Jerry
- Hoku as Shawn
- Michelle Holgate as Donna
- Scott Johnson as Matt
- Jessica Kinsella as Sabrina
- April Lunsford as Melissa
- Lee Majors as Mr. Travers
- Michael Margetis as Mumps
- Bruce Nelson as Referee
- Chelsea Staub as Carol
- Shane Van Dyke as Mike
- Michael Wayne as Ty
- Tracy Wilkinson as Ms. Reed
- Dillon Zrike as Logan
