= Take It Like a Man =

Take It Like a Man may refer to:

== Albums ==
- Take It Like a Man (Amanda Shires album) or the title song, 2022
- Take It Like a Man (Butcher Babies album), 2015
- Take It Like a Man, an EP by Shannon Curfman, 2006

== Songs ==
- "Take It Like a Man" (Bachman–Turner Overdrive song), 1975
- "Take It Like a Man" (Cher song), 2013
- "Take It Like a Man" (Dragonette song), 2007
- "Take It Like a Man" (Michelle Wright song), 1992
- "Take It Like a Man", a song by Bleona, 2013
- "Take It Like a Man", a song by the Offspring from Ignition, 1992

== Other uses ==
- Take It Like a Man (autobiography), a 1995 book by Boy George
- Take It Like a Man, a 2005 comedy DVD by Lisa Lampanelli
