= Sorority Row =

- Theatrical release poster
- Directed by: Stewart Hendler
- Screenplay by: Josh Stolberg; Pete Goldfinger
- Based on: The House on Sorority Row by Mark Rosman
- Produced by: Darrin Holender; Mike Karz
- Starring: Briana Evigan; Leah Pipes; Rumer Willis; Jamie Chung; Margo Harshman; Audrina Patridge; Julian Morris; Matt O'Leary; Matt Lanter; Carrie Fisher
- Cinematography: Ken Seng
- Edited by: Elliot Greenberg
- Music by: Lucian Piane
- Production companies: House Row Productions; Karz Entertainment
- Distributed by: Summit Entertainment
- Release date: September 11, 2009 (United States)
- Running time: 101 minutes
- Country: United States
- Language: English
- Budget: $12.5 million
- Box office: $27.2 million

Sorority Row is a 2009 American mystery slasher film directed by Stewart Hendler and written by Josh Stolberg and Pete Goldfinger. The film is a remake of the 1982 film The House on Sorority Row. Starring Briana Evigan, Leah Pipes, Rumer Willis, Jamie Chung, Margo Harshman, Audrina Patridge, Julian Morris, Matt O'Leary, Matt Lanter, and Carrie Fisher, the film follows Cassidy (Evigan), Jessica (Pipes), Ellie (Willis), Claire (Chung), and Chugs (Harshman), members of Theta Pi sorority who cover up the accidental death of fellow sorority sister Megan (Partridge) after a vindictive prank against her boyfriend Garrett (O'Leary) goes horribly wrong. Eight months later, a masked killer begins stalking and murdering the girls on the night of their graduation for their role in the cover up.

Sorority Row was theatrically released in the United States on September 11, 2009, to negative reviews from critics, though the performances of the cast were praised, and grossed $27.2 million worldwide against its $12.5 million production budget.

== Plot ==
Rosman University students and Theta Pi sorority sisters Cassidy, Jessica, Ellie, Claire, Chugs, and Megan attend a party to celebrate their senior year, during which they pull a prank on Garrett, Chugs' brother and Megan's boyfriend, as revenge for his infidelity. As part of the prank, Chugs gives Garrett B-12 vitamins, telling him that they are roofies, and Megan fakes her death, leading to Garrett and the girls leaving for the steel mine to dump her body. However, he stabs her with a tire iron, inadvertently killing her. The group throws Megan's body and the tire iron down a mine shaft before vowing never to discuss the incident again, though Cassidy and Ellie are reluctant.

Eight months later, on the day of graduation, the girls all receive a text message from an anonymous person containing an image of a robed arm holding a bloodied tire iron. They initially suspect Garrett, but Chugs insists he has changed and is not mentally competent afterward. Amidst this, Megan's younger sister, Maggie, arrives at the university to honor her memory. Later, a hooded individual murders Chugs, her psychiatrist, Joanna - a sorority sister who overheard Claire and Jessica discussing Megan's death - and Claire's boyfriend Mickey, the last of which Ellie witnesses.

As Cassidy, Claire, Jessica, and Ellie regroup, they receive a text containing a video of Megan's death and a message demanding they return to the steel mine or else the video will be sent to the police. When the girls arrive, they encounter a guilt-ridden Garrett, who has cut his wrists. Still believing he is sending the texts, Jessica runs him over with her car, only to learn he had also received them. Ellie fears Megan is still alive and seeking revenge. The girls lower Cassidy down into the mine shaft where they threw Megan's body to confirm that she is still dead, but Cassidy finds a message written in blood saying, "Theta Pi must die" instead of Megan's body.

Upon returning to their sorority house, the girls receive a text from Chugs' phone saying she is dead, and Claire has been murdered. While searching for Jessica's boyfriend, Kyle, the girls encounter Maggie and their housemother, Mrs. Crenshaw. They reveal what they did to Megan. Mrs. Crenshaw tells them to lock themselves in a bedroom and call the police while she searches the house. Thinking Megan is alive, Maggie leaves to find her while Cassidy and Jessica look for Mickey's body to retrieve his cell phone. The killer murders Mrs. Crenshaw and attempts to kill Maggie with a Molotov cocktail, setting the house ablaze. Cassidy and Jessica eventually find Kyle, who attacks and injures Jessica. The pair flees to a bathroom, where they find Megan's corpse in the shower, before Kyle catches up to them and knocks out Jessica. Andy, Cassidy's boyfriend, saves them by killing Kyle, but Jessica notices the tire iron in his pocket, revealing him as the killer.

Having learned of Megan's death from Ellie and believing his future with Cassidy is in danger if the girls get caught, he set about killing everyone who knew of Megan's death. He subsequently kills Jessica, but Cassidy tricks him into thinking Ellie is in the basement. As he leaves to find her, Cassidy finds Ellie upstairs, and they attempt to escape, but Andy finds them. Hurt by Cassidy's betrayal, he attacks her while Ellie escapes. Upon hearing Maggie's cries for help, Cassidy tries to save her but is attacked again by Andy. Before he can kill her, Ellie grabs Mrs. Crenshaw's shotgun and shoots him. As the floor gives way and he falls to his death, the three girls escape the burning house as emergency personnel arrive.

A further 15 months later, Maggie is inducted into Theta Pi while a man with slashed wrists watches from afar.

== Cast ==
- Briana Evigan as Cassidy Tappan
- Leah Pipes as Jessica Pierson
- Rumer Willis as Ellie Morris
- Jamie Chung as Claire Wen
- Margo Harshman as Charlene "Chugs" Bradley
- Julian Morris as Andy Richards
- Audrina Patridge as Megan Blaire
- Caroline D'Amore as Maggie Blaire
- Carrie Fisher as Mrs. Crenshaw
- Matt O'Leary as Garrett Bradley
- Matt Lanter as Kyle Tyson
- Maxx Hennard as Mickey Donaldson
- Rick Applegate as Senator Tyson
- Ken Bolden as Dr. Rosenburg
- Nicole Moore as Joanna
- Deja Kreutzberg as Riley

== Production ==
Mark Rosman wrote a screenplay titled Seven Sisters, which he would then make into the 1982 slasher film The House on Sorority Row. Producer Mike Karz and Darrin Holender acquired the rights to the film and hired writers Josh Stolberg and Pete Goldfinger to update it. In creating a new story based on the original screenplay, the producers largely kept to the same story, "a morality tale about young women who make bad choices that come back to haunt them", but insisted that more humor be injected into the script. The finished script impressed Rosman, who came on board the film as an executive producer.

Principal photography began in October 2008 in the Pittsburgh area. Although the setting for the film is not specified, producers wanted to take advantage of Pennsylvania state tax credits and the strength of local film crews. The film was mostly shot at night in Homestead, one block from the Carnegie Library of Homestead, where about 10 houses were dressed to resemble a sorority row. The graduation scene for the fictional Rosman University (named after Rosman) was shot outside of Soldiers & Sailors Memorial Hall in Pittsburgh's Oakland neighborhood. Interior scenes of the Theta Pi sorority house were filmed on built sets at a warehouse near Crafton, Pennsylvania. The film's makeup effects were done by Gino Crognale.

== Soundtrack ==
Sorority Row (Original Motion Picture Soundtrack)

Soundtrack album by Various artists
- Released: August 31, 2009
- Genre: Soundtrack
- Length: 51:01
- Label: E1 Music

Professional ratings
Review scores
Source	Rating
Allmusic	2.5/5 stars

The film's soundtrack was released by E1 Music on August 31, 2009, and featured music by artists such as Shwayze, Ladytron, Lykke Li, Aimee Allen, and Camera Obscura, among others. The album received 2.5 out of 5 stars from Allmusic, with the review stating: "Of the 15 tracks, only a few are even remotely memorable (Ladytron's "Ghosts", Camera Obscura's "Tears for Affairs", and Dragonette's "booty" anthem "I Get Around" come to mind), but there's hardly a dull moment".

=== Track listing ===
1. "Tear Me Up" — Stefy Rae
2. "Get U Home" (Paul Oakenfold Remix) — Shwayze
3. "Ghosts" — Ladytron
4. "I Get Around" — Dragonette
5. "42 West Avenue" — Cashier No 9
6. "Get Up" — A.D.
7. "Alcoholic" — Cash Crop
8. "Break It Down" — Alana D
9. "I Like Dem Girls" — Sizzle C
10. "This Night" — Ron Underwood
11. "Say What You Want" — The DeeKompressors
12. "Tears for Affairs" — Camera Obscura
13. "Doin' My Thing" — King Juju
14. "I'm Good, I'm Gone" (Black Kids Remix) — Lykke Li
15. "Emergency" — Aimee Allen

Songs featured but not included on soundtrack:

- "No You Girls" by Franz Ferdinand
- "Goodbye Summer" by The Daylights
- "Le Disko" by Shiny Toy Guns
- "Petit Pays" by Cesária Évora
- "Jealous of My Boogie" by RuPaul
- "I Want Your Love" by Chromatics

== Release ==
A teaser trailer premiered at the 2009 San Diego Comic-Con along with the main cast discussing the film's premise and how it felt working with the crew. Sorority Row was released on September 9 in the US and September 11 in the UK.

=== Box office ===
The film grossed $5,059,802 during its opening weekend, placing sixth in the process. It then fell 50% during its second weekend of release, and it ultimately grossed $11,965,282 domestically. Internationally, its performance was mixed compared to its domestic run. It managed fourth place in its debut in the UK, while it missed the top ten in both Australia and Mexico.

=== Home media ===
The DVD and Blu-ray were released on January 11, 2010, in the UK and later on February 23, 2010 in the US.

== Reception ==
=== Critical response ===
On Rotten Tomatoes, the film has an approval rating of 24% based on 79 reviews, with an average rating of 4.20/10. The site's consensus reads: "Though it's slick and stylish, Sorority Row offers nothing new to the slasher genre and misses the mark both in its attempts at humor and thrills". Metacritic, which uses a weighted average, assigned the film a score of 24 out of 100, based on 11 critics, indicating "generally unfavorable" reviews.

Frank Scheck of The Hollywood Reporter wrote: "There's little to distinguish this from the rest of the entries coming down the horror film assembly line, though the presence of Carrie Fisher as a shotgun-toting housemother who taunts the killer by shouting 'Come to mama!' offers some camp value." Stephen Holden of The New York Times wrote the film "is an interminable mess...that juggles more characters and undeveloped subplots than it can handle and even manages to bungle the setup. But it does have two memorable camp moments...In [one], Theta Pi’s ferocious house mother, Mrs. Crenshaw (Carrie Fisher, too briefly seen), hauls out a rifle to go after the hooded fiend and announces in a deep, booming voice: 'Don’t think I’m afraid of you. I run a house with 50 crazy bitches.' That’s putting it mildly."

Russell Edwards of Variety called it "an average slasher picture that meanders indecisively between gore and gags", with the script never finding a successful balancing of horror with comedy. Kim Newman of Empire wrote: "Even the gratuitous nudity can't quite save a Heathers-goes-to-college horror that's undermined by a silly plot and clunky dialogue". Michelle Orange of The Village Voice commented, "A very thin feminist subtext about the meaning of sisterhood only highlights how badly this film botches its attempt to have it both ways: naked, bleeding cuties combined with 'final girl'-ish, butt-whipping empowerment. Call me the sarcastic sister, but the only thing screaming in any convincing way here are the cheap look, epileptic direction, and off-key, 'edgy' humor. It’s all so ‘80s I could die."

In retrospective reviews, Trace Thurman of Bloody Disgusting argued Sorority Row "manages to subvert any and all expectations by being a hilarious little slasher that knows exactly what type of film it is", and praised the film's camp humor.

== Accolades ==
Audrina Patridge and Rumer Willis were each nominated for 2009 Teen Choice Awards in the category Choice Movie: Actress Horror / Thriller.

== Future ==
Nearly 15 years later, on January 22, 2024, it was announced a sequel was in the works. Josh Stolberg will serve as screenwriter, with the plot including returning characters. The creatives involved expressed hopes that Evigan and Willis reprise their roles from the first installment as Cassidy and Ellie, respectively.
