= Sunnyside (1979 film) =

- Directed by: Timothy Galfas
- Written by: Timothy Galfas; Jeff King
- Story by: Jeff King; Robert L. Schaffel
- Produced by: Robert Schaffel
- Starring: Joey Travolta
- Cinematography: Gary Graver
- Edited by: Herbert H. Dow
- Music by: Alan Douglas; Harold Wheeler
- Distributed by: American International Pictures
- Release date: June 1, 1979 (New York City)
- Running time: 100 minutes
- Country: United States
- Language: English

Sunnyside is a 1979 American action drama film written by Timothy Galfas and Jeff King, directed by Galfas and starring Joey Travolta.

== Plot ==
In Queens, New York, Nick Martin is a gang leader in the tough neighborhood of Sunnyside, but he aspires to move his mother, Mrs. Martin, and two brothers to a better way of life. Nick, however, is entangled in the politics of the street and wants to help his community, as the leader of the “Nightcrawlers.” When vendors at a local carnival swindle Sunnyside residents, the Nightcrawlers join forces with rival hooligans, the Warlocks and the Deathmakers, to rob the amusement park. Although the groups agree to use fake weapons, a carnival employee is shot by a real gun at the hands of the Warlocks. As Nick confronts Warlock leader, Eddie Reaper, about the killing, tension between the rival gangs escalates. Meanwhile, Nick and his family make plans to move out of the neighborhood. Nick’s brother, Denny, a fledging artist, pursues employment as an illustrator, while Nick shows his mother an apartment in Manhattan. Violence erupts when the Warlocks murder a member of the Nightcrawlers. Nick and his gang retaliate by destroying the Warlocks’ hideout in an explosion. Before the final confrontation, Denny tries to warn his brother, but Nick is shot and killed, along with his rival, Reaper.

== Cast ==
- Joey Travolta as Nick Martin
- John Lansing as Denny Martin
- Stacey Pickren as Donna Rosario
- Andrew Rubin as Eddie Reaper
- Michael Tucci as Harry Cimoli
- Talia Balsam as Ann Rosario
- Joan Darling as Mrs. Martin
- Chris Mulkey as Reggie Flynn

== Release ==
The film was screened at the Embassy II theater in New York City on 1 June 1979.

== Reception ==
Leonard Maltin awarded the film one and a half stars.
