= The Bag Man =

2014 American neo-noir crime thriller film

- Theatrical release poster
- Directed by: David Grovic
- Written by: David Grovic; Paul Conway
- Produced by: Peter D. Graves; Antony Mitchell; Warren Ostergard
- Starring: John Cusack; Rebecca Da Costa; Robert De Niro; Crispin Glover; Dominic Purcell; Sticky Fingaz
- Cinematography: Steve Mason
- Edited by: Devin Maurer; Michael R. Miller
- Music by: Tony Morales; Edward Rogers
- Production companies: Cinedigm; Red Granite Pictures; TinRes Entertainment
- Distributed by: Cinedigm; Universal Studios Home Entertainment
- Release date: February 28, 2014
- Running time: 108 minutes
- Countries: The Bahamas; United States
- Language: English
- Box office: $461,780

The Bag Man (also known as Motel or The Carrier) is a 2014 neo-noir crime thriller film directed by David Grovic. It is based on an original screenplay by James Russo and a rewrite by David Grovic and Paul Conway. The film stars John Cusack, Rebecca Da Costa, Crispin Glover, Dominic Purcell, Robert De Niro and Sticky Fingaz. The film premiered on February 28, 2014, in New York and Los Angeles.

== Plot ==
Elderly gangster Robert Dragna recruits professional killer Jack to pick up a bag and wait for his arrival at a motel. Robert Dragna stresses that Jack is not to open the bag or allow anyone to view its contents under any circumstances, illustrating his point with a piece of broccoli. Confused as to why Dragna wants him to do such an apparently easy job, Jack presses for more details, but Dragna only reiterates the rules. When Jack acquires the bag and a henchman of Dragna's shoots him in the hand (not shown on screen due to budgetary reasons), Jack kills him and stuffs the body in his car's trunk. Dragna is unsympathetic when Jack calls him and instructs Jack to stick to the plan.

At the motel, Jack meets several random people: Ned, the desk clerk who uses a wheelchair; Rivka, a tall prostitute; and Lizard and Guano, a pair of bald men who are perpetually agitated about something. Jack requests room number thirteen, and Ned cautions him that it is a deathtrap, as it is unconnected to any other rooms. When two random suited men become curious about Jack, he abruptly breaks into their room and kills both for no apparent reason. A subsequent search reveals FBI badges and a briefcase. Jack sets the briefcase aside and leaves to dump the corpse poorly stored in his car, but promptly returns upon being spotted, only to discover that Rivka has broken into his room. Fearful that Lizard will kill her for some unexplained reason, she requests that he allow her to stay.

Jack initially demands that she leave, then detains her when he cannot be sure whether she opened the bag, which would have little consequence overall. Rivka points out that the briefcase contains a photo of the bag, and Jack becomes worried that others may attempt to acquire it. When Jack attempts to drive Rivka to a bus station, she spots the corpse in the back of his car and becomes agitated. Lizard and Guano first question Jack about Rivka and later, on the road, attack him and they are killed. On their corpses he finds another photo of the bag. Unsure what to do with Rivka, or of her involvement, he returns to the hotel with her to await Robert Dragna's arrival.

Ned becomes suspicious that Jack has a guest in his room and calls the sheriff. Sheriff Larson briefly questions Jack, and, after Larson leaves, Jack threatens Ned. Increasingly worried about the safety of the bag, Jack buries it near the motel carpark only to be caught by Ned, who is now out of his wheelchair. Jack kills Ned and returns to the motel, where Larson arrests him under suspicion of Ned's very recent disappearance. It is unclear who reported Ned as a missing person as he was gone 15 minutes.

As Larson prepares to torture Jack for information, Rivka shows up. Larson threatens to rape her, but she overpowers a deputy and frees Jack, who then kills Larson. When Rivka demonstrates detailed knowledge of the bag, Jack becomes suspicious of her again, but she points out that she has saved his life. Somewhat mollified, he retrieves the bag and waits in room fourteen. Dragna finally appears, disappointed in Jack's apparent lack of trust. Nonetheless satisfied that Jack has not looked in the bag, Dragna explains that the whole situation was a test of Jack's skills and character, as he doubted Jack's resolve in the wake of Jack's fiancee's unsolved murder some months earlier. The motel and the local cops are all on Dragna's payroll, and were all (unwittingly) part of the test.

As Dragna prepares to leave, Rivka spontaneously tells Jack that she looked in the bag. Frustrated, Jack points out that Dragna will now kill them both. Jack dutifully reports Rivka's action to Dragna, who orders her killed. Jack instead kills Dragna's bodyguard, who wounds Rivka. Jack hunts down Dragna, and both are wounded. Jack looks in the bag and discovers the head of his fiancee, whom Dragna had killed in order to prevent Jack from quitting the murder-for-hire business. Trying to persuade Jack to surrender, Dragna destroys the hotel (where Rivka supposedly is) with remote-detonated explosives. Moments later, Rivka appears and saves Jack by killing Dragna, but she is shot again. Later, in Dragna's lawyer's office, Rivka reveals herself as Dragna's mistress and personal assassin who was sent to the motel to ensure things went Dragna's way. She collects a five million dollar reward for Jack's assassination, and she and Jack drive off together.

== Cast ==
- John Cusack as Jack
- Rebecca Da Costa as Rivka
- Robert De Niro as Dragna
- Crispin Glover as Ned Stensen
- Dominic Purcell as Sheriff Larson
- Sticky Fingaz as Lizard
- Martin Klebba as Guano
- Theodus Crane as Goose
- David Shumbris as Pike
- Mike Mayhall as Deputy Jones
- Danny Cosmo as Bishop
- David Grovic as Dragna's lawyer

== Reception ==
Rotten Tomatoes, a review aggregator, reports that 11% of 46 surveyed critics gave the film a positive review; the average rating was 3.4/10. Metacritic rated it 28/100 based on 18 reviews. Scott Foundas of Variety called it "a tedious, self-consciously quirky postmodern noir". Stephen Farber of The Hollywood Reporter wrote, "If it weren't for the touches of cruelty, this might have been a passable B-movie, but Bag Man ends up wasting the A-list talent caught up in the lurid exercise." Stephen Holden of The New York Times described the plot as "a protracted and increasingly tedious cat-and-mouse game" that "pathetically tries to build up expectations about what might be in the bag". Mike D'Angelo of The A.V. Club called it a Quentin Tarantino knock-off made two decades too late.
