= Rebecca Da Costa =

Brazilian actress and model

Rebecca da Costa
- Born: 9 May 1984 (age 42); Recife, Pernambuco, Brazil
- Occupations: Actress, model
- Years active: 2009-present
- Modeling information
- Height: 1.80 m (5 ft 11 in)
- Hair color: Brown
- Eye color: Brown

Rebecca da Costa (born May 9, 1984) is a Brazilian actress and model.

== Early life and modelling career ==
Da Costa was born in Recife, capital of Pernambuco. She was educated at the Colégio Rui Barbosa, where she directed, wrote and starred in amateur theatrical productions. Of her physique she said, "Until I was 17 I thought I was ugly. I was very tall. At 13, I was 5'11″. I come from a part in Brazil where the average height for women is 5'3″. It wasn't fun at all to be the tallest one in school." Aged 14 she won a modeling contest in Recife and says, "It was amazing to see other girls like me—skinny, tall, different. That's when I started to get comfortable in my own skin, and by 17 I started to find my identity." At 14 she left home for São Paulo when she was taken on by Elite Model Management and began a ten-year modelling career. She is 5 ft 11 in (1.80 m) tall. At age 16 she was invited to work at the Milan Fashion Week and moved to Italy, working for Yves Saint Laurent, Moschino, Armani, Diesel, DKNY, Missoni, Hugo Boss and Escada, and was the face of campaigns for Swarovski, Nokia, L'Oreal, Chopard and Kellogg's.

== Filmography ==
Year	Film	Role	Notes
2010	Trick of the Witch	Anabella	
2010	Treasure of the Black Jaguar	Waitress	
2011	L.A., I Hate You	Natasha	
2011	Freerunner	Chelsea	
2012	Mine Games	Rose	
2012	Seven Below	Courtney	
2013	Breaking at the Edge	Bianca Wood	
2014	The Bag Man	Rivka	

=== Television ===
==== TV series ====
- 2009 - Entourage (HBO) - Beautiful Woman

== Acting career ==
In 2008, Da Costa gave up modelling and moved to the United States to pursue an acting career. She enrolled at the HB Studio in New York City and made her theater debut alongside Brad Garrett, in stand-up comedy.

In 2009, she made her television debut in an episode of the American HBO series Entourage. In 2010 she gained a role in the film Trick of the Witch, directed by Chris Morrissey. Her first lead film role was in 2011 in the independent L.A. I Hate You, starring Malcolm McDowell and William Forsythe, and later that year she starred in Freerunner alongside Sean Faris. In 2012, she played in the film Seven Below, co-starring with Val Kilmer and Ving Rhames, and in 2013 appeared in Mine Games.

=== The Bag Man ===
In 2014, Da Costa played in The Bag Man, "a modern day film noir shot in New Orleans", as a femme fatale who becomes involved in a story of crime and suspense. She co-starred with John Cusack and Robert De Niro. The film premiered on February 28, 2014, in New York and Los Angeles.

=== Breaking at the Edge ===
In late 2014 Da Costa was the lead role in Breaking at the Edge as a manic–depressive pregnant woman who fears for her unborn child's life. The film also features Milo Ventimiglia and Andie MacDowell. She said that preparing for the role she "talked to many psychiatrists. I didn't want to look like I was trying to play crazy."

== Philanthropy ==
From her home in Los Angeles, Da Costa works with Kids with Autism and Common Ground HIV.

== Personal life ==
Da Costa has two brothers. Her father died in 2013. She is fluent in Portuguese, Spanish, Italian and English. She enjoys dancing, reading, cooking Brazilian dishes and writing. She was in a relationship for many years but broke up in 2013. Da Costa regularly practices Transcendental Meditation and says, "It has been a gift to me."
