= Seven Below =

- Theatrical Poster
- Directed by: Kevin Carraway
- Written by: Kevin Carraway; Lawrence Sara
- Produced by: Eric Mark Fisher; Brianna Lee Johnson
- Starring: Val Kilmer; Ving Rhames; Luke Goss
- Cinematography: Harris Charalambous
- Edited by: Terry Lukemire
- Music by: Jake Staley
- Production companies: Vitamin A Films, E Fish Entertainment
- Distributed by: Arc Entertainment; XLrator Media
- Release date: April 17, 2012
- Country: United States
- Language: English

Seven Below (stylized as Se7en Below; US title Seven Below Zero) is a 2012 horror-thriller American film directed by Kevin Carraway starring Val Kilmer, Ving Rhames and Luke Goss in lead roles.

== Premise ==
The story centers on a group of strangers trapped in a time warp house where a terrible event transpired exactly 100 years prior.

== Cast ==
- Val Kilmer as Bill McCormick
- Ving Rhames as Jack
- Luke Goss as Issac
- Bonnie Somerville as Brooklyn
- Matt Barr as Adam
- Brianna Lee Johnson as Elizabeth
- Tia Sage as Mistress
- Kaleigh Howland as Amanda
- Christian Baha as Dr. Lipski
- Kylie Pfingsten as Sarah
- Jennifer Trier as May McKnight
- Silvio Wolf Busch as William
- Rebecca Da Costa as Courtney
- Corey Reilly as Sean

== Production ==
The film was shot in Goshen, Ohio.
