= Safety Patrol (film) =

- VHS cover
- Written by: Doug Draizin; Savage Steve Holland
- Directed by: Savage Steve Holland
- Starring: Bug Hall; Leslie Nielsen; Lainie Kazan; Curtis Armstrong
- Theme music composer: Joseph Vitarelli
- Country of origin: United States
- Original language: English

Production
- Running time: 92 minutes
- Production companies: Doug Draizin Productions; Walt Disney Television

Original release
- Network: ABC
- Release: March 29, 1998

Safety Patrol is a 1998 American television comedy film. The film covers the exploits of Scout Bozell, a clumsy middle school student aspiring to become a member of his school's safety patrol (uniformed hall monitors). It originally aired on ABC on March 29, 1998, as part of The Wonderful World of Disney.

== Plot ==
Scout Bozell has always dreamed of becoming a member of the safety patrol at his school, Rockridge Middle School. However, his clumsy, bumbling, hazardous nature prevents him from doing so. In one such instance shown at the film's beginning, while he picks up a banana peel on the ground and describing how hazardous it is, a kid trips over his backpack, causing his marbles to roll out and the kids to slip on them, one girl sending her lunchbox flying and it hits the principal on the head. As Scout swings his backpack to put the banana peel in the garbage, he knocks a kid off his bike, setting off a chain reaction that ends with a plastic squirrel the bike crashed into hitting a truck full of giant frozen tuna, which slide on the road and eat the last member of the safety patrol, "Joe Lobes" Lobenick, leaving him severely traumatized, and deleting the list of safety patrol until he recovers. The teachers try to convince Principal Tromp to put Scout on safety patrol, as he is the only one left on the list. Tromp agrees, but gets the school boundaries changed, transferring Scout to Laurelview Middle School.

Laurelview is currently experiencing petty theft, on a grand scale. The perpetrators are two members of the staff: Mrs. Day, the lunchlady, and the janitor, Mr. Miller. Working with them are the school's safety patrol (who are also bullies), led by the principal's son, Kent Marlowe. During the safety patrol's introduction, Scout cheers "Go safeties!", causing all the kids in the audience to say the same, except as if telling them to leave, which angers the safety patrol. Scout also meets a kid named T'Boo, who introduces him to Lefty (who is right-handed), Red, Walt Whitman, Lucky, and Hannah Zapruder, who is one of the cheerleaders. It is later revealed that T'Boo is afraid of frogs ever since an incident in his biology class when he was attacked by a frog that came back from the dead.

Meanwhile, Scout's grandfather has several broken bones (including his jaw) due to Scout accidentally (and unknowingly) knocking him off a ladder. When Mrs. Marlowe, the principal, becomes aware that a safety patrol member is involved in the thefts, Kent, Mrs. Day, and Mr. Miller look for a scapegoat to put the blame on, and so they employ Scout as a member of the safety patrol, as Mr. Miller and Kent have a mutual disliking for him. At a ceremony, in which Hannah is valedictorian, Kent gives a lighter and the key to Mrs. Marlowe's office to Mr. Miller and Mrs. Day, who then sneak them into Scout's pocket. When fellow patrolman Coop asks Scout to get his gloves, he discovers Mrs. Marlowe's office is on fire, so he puts the fire out and saves the hamster; however, when the key and the lighter fall out of his pocket, it appears as though Scout stole the key and started the fire, so he is kicked off of safety patrol and forbidden to attend the Fall Ball.

Hannah and the others are sure Scout was set up. When Hannah's father is searching through his tape for a scene he can send to Wink Martindale, he, Hannah, Scout, and the others watch the ceremony and see Kent, Mr. Miller, and Mrs. Day planting the key and lighter on Scout. Scout, Hannah, T'Boo, and the others soon discover Mr. Miller and Mrs. Day's actual identities, mother-and-son thieves Georgina and Tim Bartlett, and that they are responsible for the thefts in the school.

The crew goes to the Fall Ball, where they give the tape to performer "Weird Al" Yankovic, who plays the tape and exposes Kent and his gang for starting the fire. Tim and Georgina rob a tent, but are discovered in the process, so they take Hannah hostage aboard a hot air balloon (using Weird Al's balloon). Scout goes after them to stop them. Hannah throws a bag of money over the edge, and Tim jumps off, hanging onto the edge. Scout tries to save him but, unwilling to let go of the money to take Scout's hand, he falls, though he survives due to landing in a very small spot of water. By threatening to throw more money off the balloon, Hannah gets Georgina to land the balloon, though it crashes and sends Georgina falling into a hole, where she is hanging onto the edge. Scout and the others save her from falling to her death, during which time T'Boo encounters a frog, but soon he seems to get over the zombie frog attack. Afterward, the Bartletts are arrested.

Scout is put back on safety patrol, and is ultimately named captain by his personal hero John Walsh. Meanwhile, Kent and his gang are replaced by T'Boo, Hannah, Red, Walt, Lucky, and Lefty. Grandpa Bozell makes a full recovery, though soon after is knocked out when he is sent crashing through a door by a waxer that, earlier in the film, seems to have come to life after being plugged in by Scout. Mr. Zapruder seemingly records this to send to Wink, but his camera has no tape in it.

== Cast ==
- Bug Hall as Scout Bozell
- Leslie Nielsen as Mr. Penn
- Lainie Kazan as Mrs. Day/Georgina Bartlett
- Curtis Armstrong as Mr. Bert Miller/Tim Bartlett
- Stephanie Faracy as Mrs. Marlowe
- Alex McKenna as Hannah Zapruder
- Ed McMahon as Grandpa Bozell
- "Weird Al" Yankovic as Himself
- Charlene Tilton as Mrs. Zapruder
- John Bennett Perry as Mr. Norman Zapruder
- Phillip Van Dyke as Kent Marlowe
- John Walsh as Himself
- Wink Martindale as Himself
- Kurtwood Smith as Principal Tromp
- Lisa Stahl Sullivan as Nurse Viola
- Katsy Chappell as Mrs. Brown
- Freda Foh Shen as Mrs. Yung
- Ryan O'Donohue as Coop

== Reception ==
Scott Hettrick of the Sun Sentinel said, "all the humor here hangs on the endless sight gags and pratfalls, which in this case is plenty of rope for the movie to use to hang itself."

TV Guide said, "This entire movie needs fumigating."
