= Greg Evigan =

American actor (born 1953)

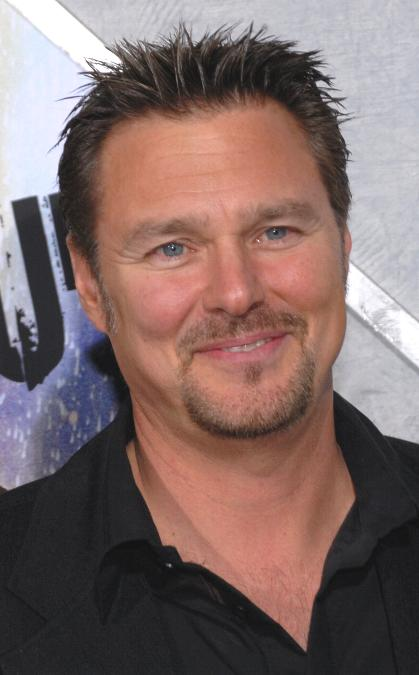
- Evigan in 2008
- Born: Gregory Ralph Evigan; October 14, 1953 (age 73); South Amboy, New Jersey, U.S.
- Education: Sayreville War Memorial High School
- Occupations: Actor; composer; producer
- Years active: 1971–present
- Known for: B. J. and the Bear; My Two Dads; TekWar; Pacific Palisades; General Hospital
- Spouse: Pamela C. Serpe (m. 1979)
- Children: Jason; Vanessa; Briana
- Website: evigan.com

Gregory Ralph Evigan (born October 14, 1953) is an American film, stage, and television actor. He began his career in theater, appearing in the Broadway production of Jesus Christ Superstar, followed by a stage production of the musical Grease, in which he portrayed the lead, Danny Zuko. Evigan made his feature film debut in Scorchy (1976), then was cast as the lead in the comedy series B.J. and the Bear, in which he starred between 1979 and 1981.

Evigan continued to appear as a guest star on numerous television series throughout the 1980s before being cast as the lead Joey Harris in the comedy series My Two Dads (1987–1990). He later appeared on the science fiction series TekWar (1995–1996), and had guest-starring roles on Melrose Place (1996–1997) and 7th Heaven (1997). He subsequently had starring roles on the soap opera Pacific Palisades (also 1997), and portrayed a record executive in the Canadian series Big Sound from 2001 to 2002.

Evigan's other film credits include the Joey Travolta–directed drama films Mel (1998) and Arizona Summer (2004), the Western film 6 Guns (2010), and the Hallmark Channel film Once Upon a Holiday (2015). In 2018, he guest-starred in a multi-episode arc as Jim Harvey on the soap opera General Hospital.

== Early years ==
Evigan was born October 14, 1953, in South Amboy, New Jersey, the son of Ralph Milan Evigan, an electrician, and his wife, Barbara Elizabeth Evigan, a homemaker. Beginning at age 8, Evigan was classically trained in piano, and went on to play the organ and saxophone. As a teenager, he played in several rock bands. Evigan grew up in Sayreville, New Jersey, and attended Sayreville War Memorial High School, graduating in 1971. In 2007 he was inducted into the school's Alumni Hall of Fame for his contributions to the arts.

== Career ==
Evigan began his career after graduating high school, appearing as a replacement in small ensemble roles in the Broadway production of Jesus Christ Superstar in 1971, as well as the touring production. Between 1972 and 1973, he starred as Danny Zuko in the Broadway production of Grease, reprising the role for the show's residency in Chicago, alongside Marilu Henner. Evigan moved to Los Angeles and was cast in his feature film debut in the exploitation film Scorchy (1976), starring Connie Stevens.

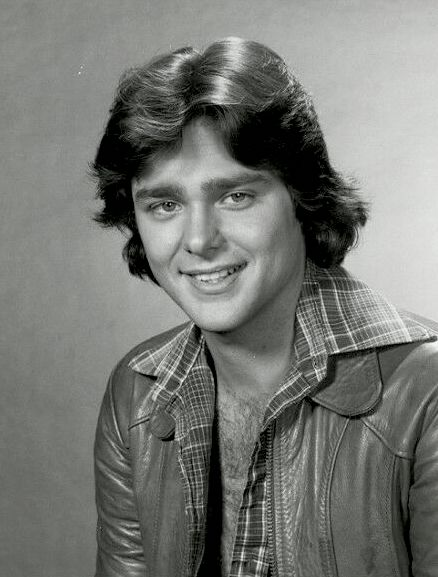
Evigan at the time of B.J. and the Bear TV show, 1979

In 1978, he was cast as Billie Joe "B.J." McKay, a truck driver whose best friend was a chimpanzee named Bear, in the series B.J. and the Bear. Following the series' conclusion in 1981, Evigan continued to work in television, with recurring guest roles on Masquerade (1984) and Murder, She Wrote (1986), then was cast in the comedy series My Two Dads (1987–1990), in which he portrayed a man who co-parents the daughter of his deceased girlfriend alongside her ex-boyfriend.

In 1989, he starred in the sci-fi film DeepStar Six, and later appeared opposite William Shatner in the sci-fi series TekWar, based on a series of books by Shatner. TekWar originated as a series of two-hour television movies in 1994, and then became a series of hour-long episodes that ran in 1995 and 1996. Between 1996 and 1997, Evigan guest-starred as Dr. Dan Hathaway on the soap opera Melrose Place, followed by a main role on Pacific Palisades, in which he portrayed one of several friends who relocate from the Midwest to California. Evigan had a lead role in Joey Travolta's directorial debut, the drama Mel (1998). In 2001, he starred in the psychological thriller film Spirit opposite Elisabeth Moss, playing the father of a teenage girl who believes their home is haunted. He reunited with director Joey Travolta, appearing in his family drama Arizona Summer (2004), followed by a supporting part in River's End (2005). Evigan returned to theater in 2008, appearing as Gar in a stage adaptation of Mask at the Pasadena Playhouse.

In Britain, Evigan is particularly well known for When Insects Attack, a humorous parody of When Animals Attack! in which American actor Greg Evigan (in reality Mark Gatiss) provides narration for a depiction of someone being improbably attacked by insects. The segment appeared on Lee and Herring’s BBC television programme This Morning With Richard Not Judy in the 1990s.

In 2015, Evigan had a supporting role in the Hallmark Channel film Once Upon a Holiday, co-starring his daughter Briana. He had a guest-starring role on the network crime series Bones in 2017, followed by a multi-episode character arc as Jim Harvey on General Hospital in 2018.

== Personal life ==
On June 3, 1979, Evigan married dancer Pamela C. Serpe. The couple has three children. Their daughters, Briana (born 1986) and Vanessa (born 1981) are actresses, while their son Jason (born 1983) is a musician and former frontman of a Los Angeles-based band, After Midnight Project.

== Filmography ==
=== Film ===
Year	Title	Role	Notes	Ref.
1976	Scorchy	Alan		
1987	Stripped to Kill	Detective Heineman		
1988	Private Road: No Trespassing	Brad Carlton		
1987	Echoes in Crimson	Grant Dunovan		
1989	DeepStar Six	Kevin McBride		
1996	Spectre	Will South	Alternate titles: House of the Damned; Escape to Nowhere	
1998	Mel	Peter		
1998	The Pawn	Ray		
2000	Die! Die! Die!	Matt	Alternate title: Sweet Revenge	
2002	Pets	Patrick O'Brian		
2004	Arizona Summer	Rick		
2005	River's End	Chuck Kramer		
2008	100 Million BC	LCDR Ellis Dorn		
2008	Journey to the Center of the Earth	Joseph Harnet		
2009	Megaconda	Parker		
2009	Split Second	Christian		
2010	6 Guns	Sheriff Barr		
2011	Cinnamon	Kevin Fallon	Alternate title: My Dog's Christmas Miracle	
2015	Only God Can	Pastor Rodney		
2015	16 and Missing	Monte		
2016	Terror Birds	Harvey Sullivan		
2019	A Thousand Miles Behind	Gary		
2020	The Christmas Listing	Herb Erickson		

=== Television ===
Year	Title	Role	Notes	Ref.
1976	Good Heavens	Duane	Episode: "Funny Fellow"	
1976	The Six Million Dollar Man	Joe Hamilton	Episode: "The Bionic Boy"	
1977	A Year at the Top	Greg	6 episodes	
1978	The Runaways	Eddie Couch	Episode: "The Lies We Live In"	
1978–1981	B.J. and the Bear	Billie Joe 'B.J.' McKay	47 episodes	
1978	Dallas	Willie Guest	Episode: "Runaway"	
1978	One Day at a Time	Doug	2 episodes	
1979	Barnaby Jones	Blue Simpson	Episode: "Target for a Wedding"	
1983	Fame	Will Gunther	Episode: "Relationships"	
1983–1984	Masquerade	Danny Doyle	13 episodes	
1984	The Yellow Rose	Trey Champion	Episode: "Debt of Honor"	
1986	Northstar	Jack North	TV movie	
1986	Murder, She Wrote	Brad Kaneally	2 episodes	
1986	Hotel	Tony Patterson	Episode: "Hornet's Nest"	
1987	Matlock	Eric Gordon / Josh Sinclair	2 episodes	
1987	Deadly Nightmares	Johnnie	Episode: "In the Name of Love"	
1987–1990	My Two Dads	Joey Harris	60 episodes	
1989	The Lady Forgets	Tony Clay	TV movie	
1989	Alfred Hitchcock Presents	David Whitmore	Episode: "In the Driver's Seat"	
1991	P.S. I Luv U	Cody Powell / Joey Paciorek	13 episodes	
1991	Lies Before Kisses	Ross	TV movie	
1992	Columbo: A Bird in the Hand	Harold McCain	TV movie	
1992	Just Deserts	Ted Thorn	TV movie	
1993	Jack's Place	Mitch Adams	Episode: "The Seventh Meal"	
1994	One of Her Own	Charlie Lloyd	TV movie	
1994–1996	TekWar	Jake Cardigan	18 episodes	
1995	Deadly Family Secrets	Eddie	TV movie	
1996–1997	Melrose Place	Dr. Dan Hathaway	12 episodes	
1997	7th Heaven	Ron Kramer	Episode: "Faith, Hope and the Bottom Line"	
1997	Pacific Palisades	Robert Russo	13 episodes	
1998	Nobody Lives Forever	Detective Rick Barrish	TV movie	
1998	Earthquake in New York	John Rykker	TV movie	
1999	Survivor	Adam King	TV movie	
1999	Family Rules	Nate Harrison	6 episodes	
1999	Touched by an Angel	Bo Beaumont	Episode: "Then Sings My Soul"	
1999	Veronica's Closet	Justin	2 episodes	
2000	Oh Baby	Billy	2 episodes	
2000–2001	Big Sound	Bill Sutton	22 episodes	
2001	Spirit	Jesse	TV movie	
2001	Reba	Bill Haden	Episode: "The Man and the Moon"	
2002	He Sees You When You're Sleeping	Joe	TV movie	
2003	Straight From the Heart	Edward Morgan	TV movie	
2003	JAG	Master Chief Shattuck	Episode: "Empty Quiver"	
2004	Found	Charles Drake	TV movie	
2005	CSI: Miami	Sean Walsh	Episode: "Money Plane"	
2005	Cerberus	Marcus Cutter	TV movie	
2006	Our House	Todd Preston	TV movie	
2006	Hoboken Hollow	Tom Stockwell	TV movie	
2006	My Silent Partner	Steven Webber	TV movie	
2007	Desperate Housewives	Charles McLain	Episode: "Into the Woods"	
2008	Poison Ivy: The Secret Society	Professor Andrew Graves	TV movie	
2008	Mail Order Bride	Tom Rourke	TV movie	
2008	Phantom Racer	JJ Sawyer	TV movie	
2008	Cold Case	Chuck Pierce	Episode: "One Small Step"	
2009	Heat Wave	Ed Dobbs	TV movie	
2011	Metal Tornado	Jonathan Kane	TV movie	
2012	The Glades	Bruce Phillips	Episode: "Fountain of Youth"	
2012	The Finder	Bronski	Episode: "Bullets"	
2013	Invasion Roswell	Patrick	TV movie	
2013	Shadow on the Mesa	Peter Dowdy	TV movie	
2015	Once Upon a Holiday	George	TV movie	
2015	CSI: Crime Scene Investigation	Bruce Waters	Episode: "Merchants of Menace"	
2017	Bones	Rick Tobine	Episode: "The Final Chapter: The Grief and the Girl"	
2018	General Hospital	Jim Harvey	26 episodes	
2018	9-1-1	Roger	2 episodes	

== Stage credits ==
Year	Title	Role	Notes	Ref.
1971	Jesus Christ Superstar	Annas	Mark Hellinger Theatre	
1972–1973	Grease	Danny Zuko	Broadway; Chicago tour	
2008	Mask	Gar	Pasadena Playhouse	
