= S. Darko =

2009 film by Chris Fisher

- Release poster
- Directed by: Chris Fisher
- Screenplay by: Nathan Atkins
- Based on: Characters by Richard Kelly
- Produced by: Adam Fields; Ash R. Shah
- Starring: Daveigh Chase; Briana Evigan; Jackson Rathbone; Ed Westwick; James Lafferty
- Cinematography: Marvin V. Rush
- Edited by: Kent Beyda
- Music by: Ed Harcourt
- Production company: Silver Nitrate Productions
- Distributed by: 20th Century Fox Home Entertainment
- Release date: May 12, 2009
- Running time: 103 minutes
- Country: United States
- Language: English
- Budget: $4 million
- Box office: $1,035,846 $44,103 (2011 re-release)

S. Darko, also known as S. Darko: A Donnie Darko Tale, is a 2009 American science fiction thriller film directed by Chris Fisher and starring Daveigh Chase, Briana Evigan, and Ed Westwick. It is a sequel to the 2001 cult film Donnie Darko. It was made without involvement from the first film's writer and director, Richard Kelly.

In Donnie Darko, the main character of the same name is a young man troubled by hallucinations of doomsday who ends up being killed by a mysterious falling jet engine. S. Darko is set seven years after Donnie's death. His sister Samantha Darko is beset by sleepwalking, hallucinations and apparent time travel as she tries to unravel a small town's mysteries.

== Plot ==
Seven years after the death of Donnie Darko, his sister Samantha struggles with his death and has started sleepwalking. She joins her best friend Corey on a road trip to California. When their car breaks down in Conejo Springs, they get help from the town's "bad boy" Randy. The pair learn that a local boy, Billy Moorcroft, has gone missing. That night, during a bout of sleepwalking, Samantha meets a homeless veteran with PTSD nicknamed "Iraq Jack" living in a junkyard, and the pair sit and talk atop a windmill.

The next morning, Samantha wakes up outside and sees that a meteorite has crashed into the windmill. Samantha and Corey meet Jeremy, a nerdy young man who bought the meteorite and is investigating it. Samantha learns that Randy's younger brother is missing and presumed dead. That night, a surreal vision of an undead Samantha with a piece of metal lodged in her skull takes Jack to the local church and commands him to burn it. The next day, police find his dog tags in the ashes.

Samantha wakes up next to a highway, where she encounters Randy and Corey in a car together. Wanting to leave town, Samantha walks off into the highway, where a car hits and kills her. Anguished about her best friend's death, Corey meets a boy who leads her into a portal, which takes her back in time to shortly before the crash. Corey reconciles with Samantha, but Corey is struck and killed in the same car crash, devastating Samantha.

The next day, Samantha wakes up on a hilltop with Iraq Jack, who reveals his real name to be Justin. Samantha finds the bodies of Randy's little brother and Billy Moorcroft; the townspeople assume that Justin is responsible and police take him into custody. Jeremy, apparently sickened by the meteorite, becomes manic and violent with Samantha and accidentally kills her. The undead Samantha appears to Justin and frees him from jail. He goes back in time to the moment he was sitting on the windmill. Justin chooses to stay and is killed by the meteorite.

Samantha and Corey visit the site and find the locals taking away Justin's body. The owner of the land decides not to sell the meteorite. Samantha, having never experienced the events after the meteorite crash, heads home while Corey stays in Conejo Springs with Randy.

== Cast ==
- Daveigh Chase as Samantha Darko
- Briana Evigan as Corey Corn
- Ed Westwick as Randy Holt
- James Lafferty as Justin Sparrow
- Jackson Rathbone as Jeremy Frame
- Elizabeth Berkley as Trudy Kavanagh
- Matthew Davis as Pastor John Wayne
- John Hawkes as Phil
- Barbara Tarbuck as Agatha
- Zulay Henao as Baelyn

== Production ==
Donnie Darko's writer and director, Richard Kelly, has stated that he had no involvement with S. Darko. He stated "To set the record straight, here are a few facts I'd like to share with you all—I haven't read this script. I have absolutely no involvement with this production, nor will I ever be involved." Chris Fisher, director of S. Darko, noted that he was an admirer of Kelly's film, and that he hoped "to create a similar world of blurred fantasy and reality."

The film was an independent production of Silver Nitrate Productions, and not by Newmarket Films (which produced the original film)—Newmarket had gone dormant by this time. 20th Century Fox Home Entertainment, who had the distribution rights to the first Darko, released S. Darko domestically on home video.

Filming for S. Darko began on May 18, 2008. The crew used the high resolution digital Red One cameras. Musician Ed Harcourt signed to provide the score for the film after he "read the script and loved it". For inspiration he listened to electronic music like Clint Mansell's score for Requiem for a Dream, and he hoped his score would be both "surreal and psychedelic just like the movie.” S. Darko was filmed in Coalville, Utah and Magna, Utah.

== Marketing ==
To promote the film, a viral marketing campaign was launched consisting of three YouTube videos.

The first video is footage from a surveillance camera, showing a dumpster falling from the sky and crushing a child.

The second video is from a conspiracy theorist expressing his beliefs that metallic objects which—with no apparent rational explanation—fall from the sky and lethally crush people are "Artifacts". "Artifacts", he explains, are from parallel universes that have accidentally made contact with our main universe. He believes that when the two universes meet again further down in time, both of them will be catastrophically destroyed unless something is done to prevent this. Examples of such "Artifacts" are the jet engine that killed Donnie Darko, a manhole that decapitated a young girl, the aforementioned dumpster, and a meteor shower over Utah that resulted in the death of a local man. The meteor shower is one of the main events that happen in the movie.

The third video is from a young girl responding to the creator of the previous video. She accuses him of being a fraud and a hack who doesn't understand what he's talking about because he stole his theories from Roberta Sparrow's book, The Philosophy of Time Travel, which was featured in the original movie. She then shows him another link between several of these disastrous events: the falling dumpster left a hole in the ground with a shape apparently similar to a drawing of Frank's mask retrieved from Donnie Darko's psych file; and the same shape also appears in a hunk of twisted, wrought-iron metal pulled from the wreckage of the windmill that was destroyed by the meteor shower in Conejo Springs.

The marketing campaign was widely considered a failure along with the film itself.

== Critical reception ==
The film was largely panned by critics, often citing its muddled storyline, one-sided characters, and superficial dialogue. The A.V. Club gave the film an F, noting that the sequel took "a few simple, surface elements from Donnie Darko and fail[ed] spectacularly in trying to create a franchise".

The Washington Post gave a somewhat better review, calling it average but stating that "The Darko faithful are better off skipping the movie entirely and devoting their attention to the making-of featurette and the commentary track" and that they "have little faith that the moviegoers who once fell in love with Kelly's unique take on teen alienation will see S. Darko as anything more than a very minor pop-cultural footnote."

In an interview with PopMatters magazine journalist J.C. Maçek III, Donnie Darko director Richard Kelly said regarding S. Darko, "I hate it when people ask me about that sequel because...I had nothing to do with it. And I hate it when people try and blame me or hold me responsible for it because I had no [involvement]. I don't control the underlying rights to [the Donnie Darko franchise]. I had to relinquish them when I was 24 years old. I hate when people ask me about that because I've never seen it and I never will, so… don't ask me about the sequel...Those people are making lots of money. They’re certainly making lots of money."

Rotten Tomatoes gave the film a rating of 13% based on reviews from eight critics.

== Home media ==
The film was released on DVD and Blu-ray on May 12, 2009, in the United States, and on July 6, 2009, in Europe.
