= Bug Hall =

American actor (born 1984/85)

- Hall in 2021
- Born: Brandon Hall; 1984 or 1985 (age 41–42); Fort Worth, Texas, U.S.
- Occupation: Actor
- Years active: 1994–2021
- Spouse: Jill de Groff (m. 2017)
- Children: 5

Brandon "Bug" Hall is an American former actor. He is best known for his childhood roles as Alfalfa Switzer in The Little Rascals (1994), Newt Shaw in The Big Green (1995), and Buster Stupid in The Stupids (1996).

== Early life ==
Brandon Hall, nicknamed "Bug" by his family, is the second oldest in his family. He spent his early childhood in Texas where his mother owned a daycare. He had never left the state before auditioning for The Little Rascals. When his younger brother, actor Gemini Barnett, was filming Second Noah, the family moved to Florida. Hall insisted on attending public schools and eventually graduated early from East Bay High School in Florida.

As a young adult, Hall broke both of his arms after crashing a BMW R1200. He later broke his collarbone in another motorcycle accident while filming Harley and the Davidsons in Romania.

== Career ==
Most popular as a child actor during the 1990s, he is best known for portraying Our Gang kid Alfalfa in the 1994 film The Little Rascals. He and five others in the cast of The Little Rascals won a Young Artist Award for Best Performance by a Youth Ensemble in a Motion Picture.

Following Rascals, Hall appeared in John Landis's The Stupids and the soccer comedy The Big Green. In 1996, Hall was nominated for a YoungStar award (Best Performance by a Young Actor in a Made For TV Movie) for his work as Eddie Munster in the Fox telefilm The Munsters' Scary Little Christmas, and he voiced a little boy in Disney's Hercules in 1997.

In 1998, he played the lead as Scout Bozell in the film Safety Patrol. Hall also starred in Disney's Honey, We Shrunk Ourselves as Adam Szalinski. He continued to appear in films as a teenager and young adult. He was in the direct-to-DVD film Skipped Parts, released in 2000. He also appeared in 2002 in the Disney Channel Original Movie Get a Clue. Hall has had many TV guest appearances, appearing on Charmed, Strong Medicine, CSI: Crime Scene Investigation, Cold Case, Justice, Providence, Criminal Minds, and 90210.

== Personal life ==
=== Religious and gender role beliefs ===
In 2013, Hall converted to Catholicism. He left Hollywood in 2020. In 2021, Hall stated that he and his family had moved to a farm in the Midwest, so as to undertake a vow of poverty.

In December 2022, Hall was temporarily banned on Twitter after posting Tweets in support of marital duty and corporal punishment of minors, regarding his two daughters. He followed up on the ban through his Instagram stating: "The truth will always be unpopular. The truthful will always be persecuted. But eternity will always be sweet".

Hall referred to his four daughters as "dishwashers" in September 2024, when announcing the birth of his son, whom he referred to as "heir". These comments on X (formerly Twitter) drew sharp criticism. Hall has described himself as a "radical Catholic extremist".

=== Fundraising solicitation ===
In November 2026, expecting his sixth child, Hall opened a GoFundMe seeking $2,000 of financial aid. Within a week the fundraiser had raised $27,000. On November 9, GoFundMe paused it for review and funds could not be withdrawn. Although initially resolving to shut the fundraiser down when it reached the $2,000 goal, Hall said he would keep the excess funds, "despite widespread backlash" to the fundraiser.

By November 10, the fundraiser had raised $29,000.

=== Legal issues ===
In June 2020, Hall was arrested for inhaling an air duster and was charged with a misdemeanor possession for use to inhale or ingest a volatile chemical. He was held and released on a $1,500 bond at Parker County Jail. TMZ reported that Hall's family were the ones who made the report and that Hall himself admitted to inhaling from cans.

He was arrested again in 2026 after being charged in Ohio for failing to appear for a court date in 2024; the court date was for not having vehicle liability insurance.

== Filmography ==
=== Film ===
Year	Title	Role	Note(s)
1994	The Little Rascals	Alfalfa	
1995	The Big Green	Newt Shaw	
1996	The Stupids	Buster Stupid	
1997	Honey, We Shrunk Ourselves	Adam Szalinski	Direct-to-video
1997	Hercules	Little Boy	Voice
1998	Mel	Travis	
2000	Skipped Parts	Sam Callahan	
2004	Arizona Summer	Scott	
2005	Mortuary	Cal	
2008	The Day the Earth Stopped	Man	Direct-to-DVD
2009	Camouflage	Corey	
2009	American Pie Presents: The Book of Love	Robert "Rob" Shearson	Direct-to-DVD
2012	Fortress	Michael Schmidt	
2012	Atlas Shrugged: Part II	Leonard Small	
2012	Karaoke Man	Max	
2014	The Little Rascals Save the Day	Ice Cream Man / Delivery Man	Direct-to-DVD
2014	North Blvd	Peter	
2015	Subterranea	The Captive	
2015	Body High	Ray	
2017	The Shadow People	Andrew	
2019	Prime Time	Eddie Roland	Short film
2020	This Is the Year	Donnie	Also co-screenwriter
2024	Cabrini	Christopher Weddington	Filmed in 2021

=== Television ===
Year	Title	Role	Notes
1995	Tad	Tad Lincoln	Television film
1996	The Munsters' Scary Little Christmas	Eddie Munster	Television film
1998	Safety Patrol	Scout Bozell	Television film
1998	Kelly Kelly	Brian Kelly	Main cast; 7 episodes
1999	Providence	Jackie	Episode: "Guys and Dolls"
2002	Get a Clue	Jack Downey	Television film
2003	The King and Queen of Moonlight Bay	Tim Spooner	Television film
2003	Footsteps	Spencer Weaver	Television film
2004	CSI: Crime Scene Investigation	Daniel Halburt	Episode: "Viva Las Vegas"
2004	Strong Medicine	Steve Kelley	Episode: "A Dose of Reality"
2004	Charmed	Eddie Mullen	Episode: "Charmed Noir"
2005	Cold Case	Matthew Adams	Episode: "Blank Generation"
2006	The O.C.	Robert	Episode: "The Heavy Lifting" (uncredited)
2006	Justice	Colin Clark	Episode: "Crucified"
2006	CSI: Miami	Evan Dunlar	Episode: "High Octane"
2010	Saving Grace	Nick	Episode: "You Can't Save Them All, Grace"
2010, 2012	Nikita	Robbie	2 episodes
2011	Criminal Minds	Ben	Episode: "With Friends Like These"
2011	Memphis Beat	Matt Harris	Episode: "Body of Evidence"
2011	90210	Darius	Episode: "Rush Hour"
2011	CSI: NY	Mike Black	Episode: "Indelible"
2012	Arachnoquake	Paul	Television film
2013	CSI: Crime Scene Investigation	Ernest Prestwich	Episode: "Double Fault"
2013	Major Crimes	Scott Perry	Episode: "I, Witness"
2013	Masters of Sex	Schacter	Episode: "Involuntary"
2014	Castle	Jesse Jones	Episode: "Limelight"
2014	Revolution	Brian	3 episodes
2016	Harley and the Davidsons	Arthur Davidson	3 episodes
2021	A Tale Dark & Grimm	—N/a	Executive producer

=== Awards and nominations ===
Year	Award	Category	Nominated work	Result
1995	Young Artist Awards	Best Performance by a Youth Ensemble in a Motion Picture (shared with the cast)	The Little Rascals	Won
1997	YoungStar Awards	Best Performance by a Young Actor in a Made-for-TV Movie	The Munsters' Scary Little Christmas	Nominated
2022	Children's and Family Emmy Awards	Outstanding Animated Series	A Tale Dark & Grimm	Nominated
