= Edward Rogers (composer) =

American composer

Edward Rogers is a Los Angeles–based musician and composer for film and television. He has written the music for several television series, including Bloodline (Netflix), Warehouse 13 (Syfy), NYPD Blue (ABC), Over There (FX), and Alphas (Syfy) as well as numerous films, advertising spots and television movies. In 2014 he co-wrote the score for The Bag Man starring Robert De Niro, John Cusack and Crispin Glover with composer Tony Morales. He collaborated with Morales again on the first season of Bloodline, released in March 2015.

In 2010 he was nominated for a Primetime Emmy for "Outstanding Original Main Title Theme Music" for the Warehouse 13 theme. In 2011 he was nominated for a Hollywood Music in Media Award for "Best Soundtrack" for the Warehouse 13 Season 2 Soundtrack album.

Ed Rogers studied composition at Dartmouth College and the University of Southern California. He is the cousin of folk singer James Gamble Rogers IV.

== Selected Composer credits ==
- Bloodline
- The Bag Man
- Alphas
- Warehouse 13
- Hide Away
- NYPD Blue
- Over There
- Arrest & Trial

== Selected Orchestration/Arranging Credits ==
- The Bank Job
- Covert One: The Hades Factor
- Law & Order: Trial by Jury
- Murder One
- Dark Blue
