= Vanessa Lee Evigan =

American actress

- Born: Los Angeles, California, U.S.
- Occupation: Actress
- Years active: 1993–present
- Father: Greg Evigan
- Relatives: Briana Evigan (sister); Jason Evigan (brother)

Vanessa Lee Evigan is an American actress. She is best known for her supporting roles in films such as Whatever It Takes, Sorority Boys, In My Sleep, and Blood Ransom.

== Early and personal life ==
Evigan was born in Los Angeles, California, the daughter of dancer, model, and actress, Pamela C. Serpe and actor Greg Evigan. Her youngest sister is Briana Evigan and her older brother is Jason Evigan. She has Polish (from her paternal grandmother) and Italian (from her maternal grandfather) heritage.

== Career ==
In 2001, Evigan appeared in the vocal group Nuance on the PlayStation 2 video game Unison: Rebels of Rhythm & Dance. The group consisted of Evigan, Brianna Hayes, and Rachel Riggs playing the characters of Cela, Chilly and Trill, respectively. They were described as "an up-and-coming unsigned R&B/pop group". Their vocal coach was Seth Riggs and they were managed by Larry Rudolph.

== Filmography ==
=== Film ===
Year	Title	Role	Notes
1998	Mel	Susie	
2000	Whatever It Takes	Vanessa	
2002	Time of Fear	Samantha Jennings	
2002	Sorority Boys	Hot Girl	
2003	Net Games	Peg Wallace	
2004	Quiet Kill	Milly Martin	
2007	Farce of the Penguins	Milton Penguin	Direct-to-video; voice role
2008	Journey to the Center of the Earth	Victoria Jansen	Direct-to-video
2009	Project Solitude	Mia	
2010	In My Sleep	Kelly	
2010	Christmas Mail	Heather	
2010	Old West	Sally	Short film
2012	Sand Sharks	Brenda Stone	
2012	Zombie Hamlet	Kate Spangler	
2014	Blood Ransom	Anna	
2015	The Morning After	Stephanie	
2015	Only God Can	Gracie	
2017	Smartass	Bird	
2018	Every Other Holiday	Lydia	
2022	Desperate Riders	Leslie	

=== Television ===
Year	Title	Role	Notes
1993	Jack's Place	Nicole Pierson	Episode: "Forever and Ever"
1993	Against the Grain	Jenny Clemons	Main role; 8 episodes
1997	Social Studies	Sara Valentine	Main role; 6 episodes
1998	Boy Meets World	Kimberly	Episode: "If You Can't Be with the One You Love..."
1998	You Wish	Jill Wilcox	Episode: "The Bad Influence"
1998	Earthquake in New York	Alexandria Fuller	Television film
1999–2000	The Young and the Restless	Brittany Hodges	Recurring role; 26 episodes
2000	Norm	Allison	Episode: "Norm vs. Youth: Part 1"
2003	Less Than Perfect	Sandy	Episode: "Rules"
2005	McBride: The Chameleon Murder	Abigail Kramer	Television film
2005	How I Met Your Mother	Kelly	Episode: "Okay Awesome"
2006	Emily's Reasons Why Not	Kristin	Episode: "Why Not to Hire a Cute Male Assistant"
2007	Holiday in Handcuffs	Katie Chandler	Television film
2012	In Plain Sight	Victoria Ramirez	Episode: "Drag Me to Hell"
2012	Underbelly	Amber	Episode: "Pilot"
2012	A Christmas Wedding Date	Allison	Television film
2016	I Know Where Lizzie Is	Rebecca Holden	Television film
2017	Born and Missing	Ashley Thompson	Television film; also known as Babynapped
