= Galore (Dragonette album) =

Studio album by Dragonette
- Released: August 6, 2007
- Recorded: 2005–07
- Studio: Various: 418 Airlines, Vespa Music Group (Toronto, Ontario); Dragon's Lair, Mayfair Studios, RAK Studios, The Sample Factory, Tower of Power, Townhouse Studios (London, England); Echo Studios, The Computer Hell Cabin (Los Angeles, California)
- Length: 36:58
- Label: Mercury
- Producer: Iyiola Babalola; Dragonette; Junkie XL; Greg Kurstin; Darren Lewis; Steve Power

Dragonette chronology
Dragonette EP (2005)	Galore (2007)	Fixin to Thrill (2009)

Singles from Galore
- 1. "I Get Around" Released: April 30, 2007; 2. "Take It Like a Man" Released: July 23, 2007

Professional ratings
Aggregate scores
Source	Rating
Metacritic	61/100
Review scores
Source	Rating
AllMusic	3.5/5 stars
BBC Music	favourable
ChartAttack	4/5
The Guardian	3/5 stars
The Observer	3/5 stars
Slant Magazine	4/5 stars
Spin	6/10

Galore is the debut studio album by Canadian electronic music band Dragonette, released on August 6, 2007, by Mercury Records. The album contains a mix of newly recorded tracks and reworked songs which had featured on their independently released Dragonette EP, which was available through the band's website two years earlier.

== Release ==
Anticipation for the album was increased early in 2007 when Popjustice published a "Greatest Hits of 2007" list including four of the album's tracks: "I Get Around", "True Believer", "Marvellous" and "Competition". While "I Get Around" and "Take It Like a Man" were both released as proper singles, music videos for "Competition" and "Jesus Doesn't Love Me" were filmed and released online.

Galore was first released digitally in the United Kingdom and the United States in August 2007. A physical release followed in the UK and Canada in September 2007, and in the US in November 2008.

== Track listing ==
No.	Title	Writer(s)	Producer(s)	Length
1.	"I Get Around"	Martina Sorbara; Dan Kurtz	Dragonette	3:28
2.	"Competition"	Sorbara; Kurtz	Dragonette; Greg Kurstin	3:27
3.	"Take It Like a Man"	Sorbara; Kurtz; Steve Chrisanthou; Pete Prilesnik	Dragonette	3:03
4.	"True Believer"	Sorbara; Kurtz	Dragonette; Kurstin	3:42
5.	"Another Day"	Sorbara; Kurtz	Dragonette	2:52
6.	"Get Lucky"	Sorbara	Dragonette	3:05
7.	"Jesus Doesn't Love Me"	Sorbara; Kurtz	Dragonette; Junkie XL	2:52
8.	"Black Limousine"	Sorbara; Kurtz; Kurstin	Dragonette; Kurstin	3:38
9.	"Gold Rush"	Sorbara; Kurtz; Joel Stouffer	Dragonette; Darren Lewis; Iyiola Babalola	3:40
10.	"You Please Me"	Sorbara; Kurtz	Dragonette; Steve Power	4:23
11.	"Marvellous"	Sorbara; Kurtz	Dragonette	2:48

US edition bonus track
No.	Title	Writer(s)	Length
12.	"The Boys"	Calvin Harris	3:14

== Personnel ==
Credits adapted from the liner notes of Galore.

Dragonette

- Dragonette – production
- Martina Sorbara – vocals (all tracks); keyboards (tracks 4, 5, 11)
- Dan Kurtz – bass, keyboards, programming (all tracks); backing vocals (track 2–4, 6–11); guitar (tracks 1–3, 7–11); electric guitar (tracks 4, 5)
- Joel Stouffer – drums (tracks 1–5, 8–11); keyboards (tracks 3, 9); percussion (track 6)
- Will Stapleton – guitar (track 3); acoustic guitar (tracks 5, 6)
- Simon Craig – guitar (tracks 1, 2)

Additional personnel

- Richard Andrews – art direction, design
- Dave Arch – piano (tracks 4, 10)
- Iyiola Babalola – production (track 9)
- Simon Craig – guitar
- Davide Direnzo – drums (track 6)
- Sandrine Dulermo – photography
- Andy Duncan – drum programming (track 10)
- Tracey Fox – management
- Future Cut – additional programming (track 9)
- Dan Grech-Marguerat – mixing (all tracks); vocal recording (tracks 3, 9)
- Neil Harris – management
- Ted Jensen – mastering
- Junkie XL – keyboards, production, programming (track 7)
- Greg Kurstin – production (tracks 2, 4, 8); keyboards, programming (tracks 2, 4, 8, 11)
- Michael Labica – photography
- Darren Lewis – production (track 9)
- Scott MacLachlan – A&R
- Danny Michel – acoustic guitar (track 4)
- David Naughton – additional Pro Tools (track 10)
- Steve Power – production (track 10)
- Pete Prilesnik – Pro Tools, string programming (track 3)
- Eric Ratz – drum recording (track 1)
- Tim Roe – additional Pro Tools, drum editing (tracks 2, 3, 5, 8)
- Vince Spilchuk – keyboards (track 6)
- Graeme Stewart – drum recording (tracks 3, 5, 8, 9); drum programming (track 3)
- Matt Vaughan – keyboard programming (track 10)
- Adam White – additional Pro Tools (track 8)

== Charts ==
Chart (2007)	Peak position
Canadian Albums (Nielsen SoundScan)	80

== Release history ==
Region	Date	Format	Label	Ref.
United States	August 6, 2007	Digital download	I Surrender	
United Kingdom	August 20, 2007	Digital download	Mercury	
United Kingdom	September 24, 2007	CD	Mercury	
Canada	September 25, 2007	CD; digital download	Universal	
United States	November 4, 2008	CD	I Surrender	
