= Tim Sandlin =

American novelist and screenwriter (1950–2026)

Tim Sandlin (August 11, 1950 – March 29, 2026) was an American novelist and screenwriter.

== Life and career ==
Born in Oklahoma on August 11, 1950, Sandlin spent his early summers in Wyoming while his father worked seasonally for Grand Teton National Park. Sandlin worked over 40 entry-level jobs including driving an ice cream truck, skinning elk, cooking in a Chinese restaurant, trail inventory for the Forest Service, caretaker of rental cabins, gardener for the Rockefellers, pizza parlor manager, belt buckle buffer, and multiple dishwashing jobs. Throughout this period he lived most of the year on public lands, first in a tent and later in a Cheyenne tipi.

Sandlin published 10 novels and a book of columns. Three of his books, Skipped Parts, Sorrow Floats, and Sex and Sunsets, have been produced as movies. His other novels include Western Swing, Rowdy in Paris, Honey Don’t, Lydia, The Fable of Bing, Social Blunders, Jimi Hendrix Turns Eighty, and The Pyms, Unauthorized Tales of Jackson Hole. He has also written 11 screenplays for hire. Sex and Sunsets served as the basis for the screenplay of the 2013 Canadian film The Right Kind of Wrong. Jimi Hendrix Turns Eighty and Rowdy in Paris are in pre-production for films.

He lived in Jackson, Wyoming with his wife, Carol, daughter, Leila, and son, Kyle, for many years before moving to Redmond, Washington in 2024.

Sandlin died on March 29, 2026, at the age of 75.

== Bibliography ==
=== Novels ===
- Sex and Sunsets, 1987, current reprint by Sourcebooks Landmark
- Western Swing, 1988, current reprint by Sourcebooks Landmark
- Skipped Parts, 1992, current reprint by Sourcebooks Landmark
- Sorrow Floats, 1992, current reprint by Sourcebooks Landmark
- Social Blunders, 1997, current reprint by Sourcebooks Landmark
- Lydia, 2011, current, Sourcebooks Landmark
- Honey Don't, G.P. Putnam's Sons, 2003, ISBN 978-0-399-14998-6
- Jimi Hendrix Turns Eighty, current reprint by Oothoon Press 2014
- The Fable of Bing, Oothoon Press, 2014, ISBN 9780989395755
- The Pyms: Unauthorized Tales of Jackson Hole", Oothoon Press, 1991
- Jimi Hendrix Turns Eighty. Riverhead Books. 2007. ISBN 978-1-59448-933-4. "Tim Sandlin."
- Rowdy in Paris. Riverhead Books. 2008. ISBN 978-1-59448-974-7. "Tim Sandlin."
- Lydia, Sourcebooks Landmark, 2011, ISBN 978-1-4022-4181-9

=== Essays ===
- The Pyms: Unauthorized Tales of Jackson Hole, Jackson Hole Magazine, 1991
- Somewhat True Tales of Jackson Hole, Bluechip Publishers, 2021
