= Journey to the Center of the Earth (2008 direct-to-video film) =

2008 direct-to-video film

- Home video cover
- Directed by: David Jones; Scott Wheeler
- Written by: Steve Bevilacqua
- Based on: Journey to the Center of the Earth; 1864 novel by Jules Verne
- Produced by: David Michael Latt; David Rimawi; Paul Bales
- Starring: Greg Evigan; Dedee Pfeiffer
- Cinematography: Mark Atkins
- Edited by: Tim Amick; Bobby K. Richardson
- Music by: Chris Ridenhour
- Distributed by: The Asylum
- Release date: July 1, 2008
- Running time: 85 minutes
- Country: United States
- Language: English

Journey to the Center of the Earth (released in the UK as Journey to Middle Earth) is a 2008 American science fiction action adventure film created by The Asylum and directed by David Jones and Scott Wheeler.

The film is a loose adaptation of the original 1864 novel Journey to the Center of the Earth by Jules Verne, but bears a close similarity to At the Earth's Core, a similar 1914 novel by Edgar Rice Burroughs. It is also the second film by The Asylum to be based on a Jules Verne novel, the first being 30,000 Leagues Under the Sea. A mockbuster, it was released to capitalize on the higher-budgeted film of the same title starring Brendan Fraser.

== Plot ==
A high-tech teleporter being used by the military malfunctions and teleports a team of female soldiers beneath Earth's surface instead of to Germany. The team encounters various prehistoric dangers in the foreign environment, including dinosaurs and giant arachnids. In order to rescue the team, a scientist and her ex-husband use an invention of hers, a large drilling machine, to navigate to the center of the earth. The rescuers reach the team just in time, and all of the survivors are teleported back to the surface. The scientist and her ex-husband reconcile and kiss. As everyone leaves the room, a small arachnid is seen crawling out of the team's abandoned gear.

== Cast ==
- Greg Evigan as Joseph Harnet
- Dedee Pfeiffer as Emily Radford
- Vanessa Lee Evigan as Victoria Jansen
- Caroline Attwood as Gretchen Lake
- Amelia Jackson-Gray as Kate Burroughs
- Sara Tomko as Betsey Case
- Vanessa Mitchell as Eve Abraham
- Michael Tower as Marty

== See also ==
- Kola Superdeep Borehole, The deepest hole ever actually drilled into the Earth's crust
- Viaje al centro de la Tierra, Spanish adventure film based on Journey to the Center of the Earth by Jules Verne.
