= Masquerade (TV series) =

American espionage television series

- Created by: Glen A. Larson
- Starring: Rod Taylor; Kirstie Alley; Greg Evigan
- Opening theme: "Masquerade" performed by Crystal Gayle
- Composer: Stu Phillips
- Country of origin: United States
- Original language: English
- No. of seasons: 1
- No. of episodes: 13 (1 unaired)

Production
- Running time: 44 minutes
- Production companies: Renee Valente Productions; Glen A. Larson Productions; 20th Century Fox Television

Original release
- Network: ABC
- Release: December 15, 1983 – April 27, 1984

Masquerade is an American espionage television series that aired on ABC from December 15, 1983, until April 27, 1984.

== Synopsis ==
Considered an amalgam of Mission: Impossible (indeed, Mission: Impossible alumnus William Read Woodfield was the series' executive story consultant) and The Love Boat, the tongue-in-cheek series starred Rod Taylor as Mr. Lavender, the leader of "Operation Masquerade", a top-secret branch of American Intelligence that conducts missions using ordinary civilians, recruited for their anonymity and their specialized skills. Two trained field agents, Casey Collins (Kirstie Alley) and Danny Doyle (Greg Evigan) are assigned to chaperone the amateur spies. This concept was essentially identical to Call to Danger, a series concept that had been attempted with three unsuccessful pilot films in the 1960s and 1970s, the last two starring Mission: Impossible's Peter Graves.

The Love Boat comparison (frequently used in contemporary reviews of this series) stemmed from the show's casting of a different ensemble of well-known actors each week, much as Love Boat populated its episodes. The first act of every episode depicted the recruitment of a new group of agents, which was invariably followed by a briefing by Mr. Lavender aboard his private plane, ending with Lavender saying, stone-faced: "Welcome to Operation Masquerade".

The budget was a reported $750,000 an episode.

The series debuted with a 90-minute pilot film, followed by 12 episodes before the series was cancelled. This was Kirstie Alley's first television series after her debut in Star Trek II: The Wrath of Khan the previous year. Country singer Crystal Gayle performed the theme song.

Ratings were weak, and attempts to improve them by changing the time slot did not work either.

== Cast ==
- Rod Taylor as Lavender
- Kirstie Alley as Casey Collins
- Greg Evigan as Danny Doyle

== Ratings ==
Season	Episodes	Start date	End date	Nielsen rank	Nielsen rating
1983–84	13	December 15, 1983	April 27, 1984	78	12.0 (Note: Tied with "NBC Friday Movie of the Week")

== Episodes ==
No.	Title	Directed by	Written by	Original release date	Prod. code
1	"Pilot"	Peter H. Hunt	Glen A. Larson	December 15, 1983	N/A
A KGB agent codenamed Wolfen (Oliver Reed) is systematically killing NIA operatives. With no viable agents left and Wolfen the top candidate to become the next director of the KGB, Lavender comes up with a desperate plan to use untrained civilians to discredit Wolfen in the eyes of his Soviet superiors before the ruthless killer becomes the new KGB director.
2	"Diamonds"	Peter Crane	William Read Woodfield	December 22, 1983	2J02
Lavender and his team go to Amsterdam, after a rogue spy who is going to sell missile frequency codes to the KGB for $1 million in diamonds. Believing that the Soviets will get the codes and jam NATO defenses, they set out to stop the diamond transaction.
3	"Girls for Sale"	Sidney Hayers	Glen A. Larson	December 29, 1983	2J03
In Hawaii, a senator's daughter is kidnapped in order to blackmail the senator into giving up information from the intelligence committee he serves on, and Lavender and his team must face ninja assassins to rescue her.
4	"The Defector"	Peter Crane	Andrew Schneider	January 5, 1984	2J04
A Soviet physicist wants to defect, and needs protection from the KGB death squad known as "Section 9". To throw them off the track, Lavender and his team try to make it appear as though the physicist has been killed.
5	"Caribbean Holiday"	John Llewellyn Moxey	Mark Rodgers	January 12, 1984	2J07
An NIA agent has turned traitor, and is hired by an ousted Caribbean dictator to help him start a coup that will return him to power. Lavender and his team board a cruise ship and try to stop the traitor and a group of mercenaries who have a cache of weapons stored below decks to arm the rebels once they arrive.
6	"Five Days"	John Llewellyn Moxey	Mark Rodgers	January 19, 1984	2J05
A Bulgarian woman working for the NIA is kept in a top-security women's prison by a corrupt commissioner in Portugal. As the woman holds information vital to saving the crew of a sunken American submarine, Casey gets arrested to contact her. Meanwhile, the team works to discredit the commissioner.
7	"Oil"	Phil Bondelli	William Read Woodfield	January 26, 1984	2J06
Lavender and his team race to rescue hostages a terrorist will kill if his demands are not met by his deadline.
8	"The French Correction"	Peter Crane	Andrew Schneider	March 30, 1984	2J10
Lavender and the team try to track down a shipment of medical supplies that was hijacked by the French mafia from a French airliner en route to Africa.
9	"Winnings"	Sidney Hayers	William Read Woodfield	April 6, 1984	2J09
Lavender enlists professional gamblers to stop a casino owner from selling a military tracking device to the KGB.
10	"The Sleeper"	Sidney Hayers	Mark Rodgers	April 13, 1984	2J11
Lavender and his team go after an American general who is a double agent planning to sell recordings of a Middle Eastern conference to the KGB.
11	"Spanish Gambit"	Phil Bondelli	Howard Berk, Andrew Schneider	April 20, 1984	2J08
Lavender and his team are up against another U.S. agent and the KGB in recovering stolen satellite defense hardware.
12	"Spying Down to Rio"	Sidney Hayers	Andrew Schneider	April 27, 1984	2J12
Lavender must locate a double agent in Rio de Janeiro working at the United States embassy that is selling a Cipher machine to the KGB.
13	"Flashpoint"	Phil Bondelli	Charles Kinbote	N/A	2J01
A renegade KGB general steals weapons grade Uranium-235 to detonate a Thermonuclear weapon in the United States.
