= Everyone Loves Mel =

- Directed by: Joey Travolta
- Written by: Richard Cohen; Daniel Sarokin
- Starring: Ernest Borgnine; Julie Hagerty; Greg Evigan
- Cinematography: Brian Conley
- Edited by: Joey Travolta; Will Wuorinen
- Music by: Chris White
- Release date: March 10, 2000
- Running time: 92 minutes
- Country: United States
- Language: English

Everyone Loves Mel also known simply as Mel is a 2000 American family fantasy film directed by Joey Travolta, starring Ernest Borgnine, Julie Hagerty and Greg Evigan.

== Plot ==
Bonnie and Peter are working on their marriage while dealing with a difficult teen-aged son. Her father takes the boys (Roger and Travis) in for the summer at his farm. It is apparent early on that he's fighting with developers that want his land while he wants to preserve his family's legacy. The developers had taken over a prior farm and turned it into an amusement park, something that Grandpa does not approve of. The boys explore as children will and find their grandfather is harboring a large turtle-like creature called Mel. Mel is a legend of local Swanson Lake and is known as Swannie to the general populace (similar to "Nessie"). The boys' adjustment to their life in the small town is helped by getting to know him. While going around with a girl (Susie) one day, Roger (the elder boy) accidentally causes an explosion on the developer's property with his grandfather's tractor. When the sheriff comes by to arrest Grandpa, Roger tells them he was the one who caused the wreck but they still put Grandpa in jail. Bonnie and Peter (the boys' parents) come to stay at the farm when Grandpa is jailed. The boys end up staging a break out for Mel from the amusement park and with the help of Susie and her brother try to get him back to the lake, setting a tiger loose and creating mayhem in the process.

== Cast ==
- Ernest Borgnine as Grandpa
- Julie Hagerty as Bonnie
- Greg Evigan as Peter
- Jack Scalia as Bailey Silverwood
- Bug Hall as Travis
- Josh Paddock as Roger
- Vanessa Evigan as Susie
- Paul Sampson as Matt Henderson
- George Yager as Sheriff Edgewood
- John Green as Technician (as John Green aka Marino)
- Molly Ann Lashinsky as Debbie (as Molly Lashinsky)
- Ellen Travolta as Dr. Vogul
- Jason Evigan as Sammy
- Christopher Wanner as Joey
- Doyle McCurley as Undercover cop

== Reception ==
A review at Dove.org stated, "This imaginative story may just make you wonder what you would do should Mel ever come into your life!" A review at Teen Ink was also appreciative of the film, "This is a movie that needs open minded people. It was a low-budget film by Joey Travolta (brother of John Travolta of Grease and Hairspray), so the effects are not very believable and it features many new actors and even some people that aren't actors in general. Like the policemen are actually the real policemen from the town they filmed in."
