= Mine Games =

- Directed by: Richard Gray
- Screenplay by: Michele Davis-Gray; Richard Gray; Ross McQueen
- Story by: Robert Cross; Richard Gray; Ross McQueen
- Produced by: Mike Gillespie; Richard Gray; Christopher Lemole
- Starring: Joseph Cross; Briana Evigan; Rafi Gavron; Julianna Guill; Ethan Peck; Alex Meraz; Rebecca Da Costa
- Cinematography: Greg De Marigny
- Edited by: Christopher Kroll; Heath Ryan
- Music by: Alies Sluiter
- Production companies: Vitamin A Films; Oak Street Films
- Release date: August 16, 2012 (MIFF)
- Running time: 93 minutes
- Country: United States
- Language: English
- Budget: $700,000

Mine Games (also known as The Evil Within) is a 2012 American time-loop horror film directed by Richard Gray. It stars Joseph Cross, Briana Evigan, Julianna Guill, Rafi Gavron, Ethan Peck, Alex Meraz and Rebecca Da Costa.

== Plot ==
A woman in a van seems to awaken from a nightmare about a mine, where a voice screams for “Michael,” and fingers scrabble under a door. The van is at a gas station, where a nearby newspaper announces “couple found murdered in RV.” The van belongs to a group of seven friends – Michael, Lyla, TJ, Claire, Lex, Rose and Guy – who are traveling to a cabin in the woods for a vacation with their friends Matt and Sarah. Michael, who is driving, gets lost in the dark and swerves to avoid a waving figure in the road. The van crashes, which forces them to travel on foot. They arrive at a well-furnished cabin where Rose finds a written note telling "TJ, Lex, Claire" to wait there for them, so they assume that this is the house.

The group enjoys themselves in the comfortable cabin, with the exception of Michael, who sleeps early and has nightmares of murdering their friends Matt and Sarah. That night, the cabin's apparent owners, having gotten lost, are killed in their camper. The next morning, TJ discovers an abandoned mine nearby and takes the group inside to explore. TJ and Guy, as a joke, briefly lock Michael inside an enclosed cell, which causes him to panic. Rose, who is a psychic, is uneasy about the mine and at one point feels someone grab her leg, though it cannot be one of her friends.

Michael and his girlfriend Lyla return to the van to collect Michael's anti-psychotic medication, used to treat his schizophrenia, and confirm that the van is unusable. They find the door open and blood on the van's fender, and assume that they hit an animal the previous night. Upon returning to the house, the group collectively agrees to stay one more day to wait for the owners of the house. Over the day, Rose has fits and visions of her friends in various stages of death and injury, while Michael dreams of the mine.

While exploring the mine again, TJ and Lex discover three dead bodies that appear to be themselves and Guy. They inform the others, and the group reluctantly agrees that something supernatural is occurring. TJ and Lex return to the mine in search of answers and find a traumatized Claire locked inside a cell; she claims that it is Michael's doing. TJ and Lex refuse to save her, knowing that "their" Claire is still in the house, a decision that Claire later supports. Despite Lyla's protests, the others debate whether Michael needs to be locked up overnight for their protection. Unnerved by his passive acceptance of his fate, they put him inside one of the mine's cells.

Michael escapes from the cell, which leads to a chase inside the mines, during which Michael causes TJ's and Lex's deaths and locks Claire up inside a cell, where she meets the alternate version of herself. Inside the house, Rose dies, either from poison or shock. Guy and Lyla agree to flee, leaving behind in the house a written note for "TJ, Lex, Claire" to wait there for them. Upon reaching the main road, Guy tries to wave down an oncoming van, causing it to swerve and hit Lyla. Guy recognizes the occupants of the van as themselves from the night before and realizes that they are inside a causality loop. He promises the seriously injured Lyla that he will break the cycle.

Guy rushes back to the house to warn the others but is stopped by Michael, who kills him, as well as Matt and Sarah, whose RV he stumbles across. Michael warns his past self that his friends will try to kill him, and that when they lock him inside a cell for the second time, he must defend himself. Michael gives his past self the key to the cell and, later, forces his past self to burn his anti-psychotic medication.

The cycle restarts as the group's van arrives at the gas station at the beginning of the film. However this time Lyla from the previous cycle is still alive, and she hobbles towards her counterpart surprising her.

== Cast ==
- Joseph Cross as Michael
- Briana Evigan as Lyla
- Ethan Peck as Guy
- Julianna Guill as Claire
- Rafi Gavron as Lex
- Alex Meraz as TJ
- Rebecca Da Costa as Rose
- Michael Guillod as Michael (Note: Likely crediting error – called "Matt" in the film's dialogue.)
- Lindsay Lamb as Sarah

== Production ==
The original story was written by Ross McQueen and was set in Australia. Director Richard Gray, who was living in Australia at the time, worked with McQueen to adapt it to a setting in the United States. Gray said that he was more influenced by Lord of the Flies than slasher films. In July 2011, Cross and Peck joined the cast, and the film was reported to begin shooting. The film was shot at Ape Cave in Gifford Pinchot National Forest and locations outside of Seattle, Washington. It went into post production in Los Angeles, California for an anticipated 2012 release. The film's crew consisted of a mixture of Australians and Americans, and the project was shot using the Red Epic camera.

== Release ==
The film premiered in August 2012 at the Melbourne International Film Festival. Although originally set to be released in May 2014 in the United States, it was renamed to The Evil Within, renamed back to Mine Games, and delayed until September 2014. The delay was in part due to re-shooting the ending.

There are two versions of the film, the United Kingdom and United States versions, which feature some different actors.

== Reception ==
Kwenton Bellette of Twitch Film wrote, "With such a great time travel horror thriller narrative that was advertised, Mine Games sadly comes off as nothing more than a poorly rehashed version of the masterful film Timecrimes or even Australian produced Triangle before it." Patrick Cooper of Bloody Disgusting rated it 1.5 out of 5 stars and wrote, "Time loops have been done better before (masterful even, in the case of Time Crimes). Mine Games wastes the perpetually interesting concept and delivers flat thrills and flaccid characters." Debi Moore of Dread Central rated it 3 out of 5 stars and wrote that the film starts off predictable but presents "a mind-bending series of twists and turns" that make it recommended.

== See also ==
- List of films featuring time loops
