= Desperate Riders =

2022 American film

- Directed by: Michael Feifer
- Starring: Drew Waters; Vanessa Evigan; Sam Ashby; Victoria Pratt; Cowboy Troy; Rob Mayes; Trace Adkins; Tom Berenger
- Distributed by: Lionsgate
- Release date: 2022

Desperate Riders is an American Western film, which was released in 2022.

== Plot ==
Tom Berenger stars in the western thriller, Desperate Riders. It centers on Victoria Pratt, who plays a kidnapped woman. Trace Adkins plays the kidnapper, but its unsure if she needs rescuing.

== Cast ==
- Drew Waters as Kansas Red
- Vanessa Evigan as Leslie
- Sam Ashby as Billy
- Victoria Pratt as Carol
- Cowboy Troy as Finnegan
- Rob Mayes as Deputy Harms
- Trace Adkins as Thorn
- Tom Berenger as Doc Tillman

== Production ==
The film was directed by Michael Feifer and produced by Milestone Studios.

=== Filming ===
Desperate Riders was filmed exclusively in the state of Tennessee in 2021. Filming locations included Historic Collinsville, Rippavilla Plantation, Beech Grove, and McMinnville, Tennessee. The Fairfield village at the Warren County fair grounds were used for the town scenes. Middle Tennessee was chosen for its scenery and access to country music stars.

== Release ==
The film was released in 2022 and was distributed by Lionsgate. It was released in theaters and via streaming simultaneously.
