= Inclusion Films =

Inclusion Films is a company started in 2007 by filmmaker Joey Travolta that aims to teach the art of film making to people with developmental disabilities. There are seven locations in California as well as traveling camps for youths with special needs. The first school opened in Bakersfield in 2011; other locations include: Sacramento, Livermore, San Bernardino, San Diego, Stockton, and San Jose, California.

Joey Travolta, who is actor John Travolta's older brother, has a special education degree and worked as a teacher before he became a filmmaker in the 1970s.

In February 2019, Inclusion Films created a feature film, with 70% of the crew having a disability. Directed by Joey Travolta, the film stars RJ Mitte, Donna Mills, Geri Jewell, and Andrea Fay Friedman. The feature film was premiered at the 2019 Bentonville Film Festival in Bentonville, Arkansas.

In addition, all seven workshops regularly produce and screen short films which are created in-house. In 2018, Inclusion Films began streaming select films and documentaries on their own platform, Inclusion Networks.
