= Against the Grain (TV series) =

1993 American drama TV series

- Genre: Drama
- Created by: Michael Pavone; Dave Alan Johnson
- Starring: John Terry; Donna Bullock; Ben Affleck; Vanessa Lee Evigan; Stephen Tobolowsky
- Composer: John Debney
- Country of origin: United States
- Original language: English
- No. of seasons: 1
- No. of episodes: 8

Production
- Executive producers: Lee Rich; Bruce Sallan; Jeff Freilich
- Running time: 60 minutes
- Production companies: The Lee Rich Company; Magnum Productions; Warner Bros. Television

Original release
- Network: NBC
- Release: October 1 – December 24, 1993

Against the Grain is an American drama television series that aired on NBC from October 1 until December 24, 1993. starring John Terry, Donna Bullock, Ben Affleck, Vanessa Lee Evigan and Stephen Tobolowsky. The show was inspired by Buzz Bissinger's book Friday Night Lights: A Town, A Team, and a Dream.

== Plot ==
Ed Clemons was an insurance company salesman and former high school football star who became coach of his former team, the Stumper Mustangs, located in Stumper, Texas. Episodes follow the challenges that Ed faces as he attempts to transform a losing team into the state champion.

== Cast ==
- John Terry as Ed Clemons
- Donna Bullock as Maggie Clemons
- Ben Affleck as Joe Willie Clemons
- Vanessa Lee Evigan as Jenny Clemons
- Stephen Tobolowsky as Niles Hardemann
- Cheryl Rhoads as Winona Bruhns

== Episodes ==
No.	Title	Directed by	Written by	Original release date
1	"Pilot"	Unknown	Unknown	October 1, 1993
2	"The Buck Stops...There"	Unknown	Unknown	October 8, 1993
3	"Respect"	Unknown	Unknown	October 15, 1993
4	"The Reunion"	Unknown	Unknown	October 29, 1993
5	"Don't Be a Stranger"	Unknown	Unknown	November 5, 1993
6	"Two-Minute Drill"	Unknown	Unknown	November 12, 1993
7	"E Pluribus Unum"	Unknown	Unknown	December 17, 1993
8	"A House is Not a Home"	Unknown	Unknown	December 24, 1993

== Reception ==
Writing in The New York Times, John O'Connor said that, "In some respects, the new NBC series Against the Grain does have the courage of its title. It's not just another half-hour sitcom running on wisecracks. It's an hourlong drama admirably aiming, according to one executive producer, Bruce Sallan, to present 'real-life problems and family issues.'"
