= Big Sound =

- Country of origin: Canada
- No. of seasons: 1
- No. of episodes: 22

Production
- Producer: Peace Arch Entertainment
- Camera setup: Single camera
- Running time: approx. 30 minutes

Original release
- Network: Global
- Release: December 11, 2000 – June 20, 2001

Big Sound is a Canadian television comedy series created, written, produced, and set in Vancouver, which debuted on the Global Television Network in 2000. Directed by Canadian director David Steinberg, it was a satire poking fun at the ego-driven music industry.

The show was set in the offices of a fictional record label, concentrating on the interactions between characters therein. It starred Greg Evigan. It featured numerous guest stars well known in the music business such as Scott Stapp, Matthew Good, and Bif Naked among others. Other notable guest star include The Walking Dead 's actress Laurie Holden. Shot entirely in Vancouver, the show aired for a run of 22 episodes.

The show was nominated for several awards including one from Directors Guild of Canada, and in 2001, two Gemini Awards.
