= Skipped Parts =

2001 film by Tamra Davis

- Promotional poster
- Directed by: Tamra Davis
- Screenplay by: Tim Sandlin
- Based on: Skipped Parts by Tim Sandlin
- Produced by: Alison Dickey; Sharon Oreck; Shelby Stone
- Starring: Jennifer Jason Leigh; Mischa Barton; Bug Hall; Brad Renfro; Drew Barrymore
- Cinematography: Claudio Rocha
- Edited by: Luis Colina; Michael R. Miller
- Music by: Stewart Copeland
- Distributed by: Trimark Pictures
- Release dates: June 6, 2000 (Seattle International Film Festival); January 5, 2001 (United States)
- Running time: 100 minutes
- Language: English

Skipped Parts, also known as The Wonder of Sex, is a 2000 American coming of age comedy-drama film directed by Tamra Davis, adapted from a 1991 novel by Tim Sandlin. The film stars Jennifer Jason Leigh, Bug Hall, Mischa Barton, Brad Renfro and Drew Barrymore.

After making the film festival rounds in 2000, the film had a limited release from Trimark Pictures in 2001. It was filmed in Indian Head, Saskatchewan, Regina, Saskatchewan, Fort Qu'Appelle, Saskatchewan and Regina Beach, Saskatchewan.

== Plot ==
In 1963, liberal-minded and reckless Lydia Callahan is raising her 14-year-old son, Sam. Lydia's father Caspar, a prominent local businessman, is running for governor of North Carolina, and does not want Lydia and Sam in his way, so the two are banished from North Carolina. They travel across the country and settle in Wyoming, where Lydia only wants to have a good time and refuses to allow Sam to call her "mom."

Sam soon finds out that he is one of only two students in Gro Vont High School who read. The other one is Maurey, a girl the same age as Sam who wants to learn about sex. Consequent to their mutual discoveries, Maurey becomes pregnant. She decides to have an abortion in a distant hospital and, by accident, runs into her mother and the baseball coach who are also there for the same reason.

After that Maurey moves in with Lydia and Sam since her father had permanently kicked her out from his house. Meanwhile, Hank Elkrunner, a Blackfoot, falls for the feckless Lydia, while her dictatorial dad keeps tabs on them all from afar, soon after Maurey and Sam were drinking tea and discuss about how romance works.

Later in the bedroom, when Maurey and Sam were in their underwear (Sam in tight sweat underpants and Maurey in dotted underwear) and half of the clothes were hanging around in the bed, Maurey asks Sam to go first but Sam asks to do it first, eventually they both stood naked on the implied scene, that embarrassed Sam but Maurey said they would skip parts and then embraced.

In the end, Maurey decides not to have an abortion and keeps the baby, a little girl named Shannon. After being threatened to be financially cut off unless she breaks up with Hank and lets Sam go to military school, Lydia decides to stay with Hank, and takes a job at the local diner. In addition, Hank sells his trailer and moves in with Sam and Lydia, along with Maurey and Shannon who decide to permanently move in. The film ends with Sam finishing the flashback for the story, with Shannon nearby.

Throughout the film, Sam has many dream fantasies wherein Drew Barrymore serves as the subject of his desires.

== Cast ==
- Jennifer Jason Leigh as Lydia Callahan
- Bug Hall as Sam Callahan
- Mischa Barton as Maurey Pierce
- Peggy Lipton as Laurabel Pierce
- Angela Featherstone as Delores
- R. Lee Ermey as Caspar Callahan
- Michael Greyeyes as Hank Elkrunner
- Alison Pill as Chuckette Morris
- Brad Renfro as Dothan Talbot
- Drew Barrymore as Fantasy Girl, the subject of Sam's numerous dream fantasies.
- Andrea Menard as Dot

== Production ==
Though set in Wyoming, the film was shot in Saskatchewan, Canada, in the summer of 1999.

== Release ==
The film premiered at the Seattle International Film Festival on June 6, 2000. It was later given a limited theatrical release in the United States on January 5, 2001.

=== Home media ===
Trimark Home Entertainment released the film on DVD on June 26, 2001.

== Critical reception ==
In The A.V. Club, Nathan Rabin said, "Half glib sex comedy, half preachy family drama, Skipped Parts attempts to have it both ways, ostensibly celebrating Leigh's spunkiness and iconoclasm while showcasing a mindset nearly as judgmental as the townspeople it demonizes. As Hall's young, attractive, Oedipally challenged mother, Leigh gives a characteristically passionate, full-bodied performance, but she's betrayed by a script less interested in understanding than judging her, as her son and her noble Native American lover do in the film's two most excruciating scenes. For an American coming-of-age movie, Skipped Parts is unusually blunt about sexual matters, but its bluntness manifests as a sort of winking naughtiness that curdles quickly into glib moralism. Iconoclasm may be well and good, the film seems to argue, but it's no real substitute for settling down with the right man."

In Variety, Ken Eisner commented, "In a setting we're told is rife with Cold War authoritarianism, every problem — whether it's a cafeteria argument, the death of JFK or a woman tearing off her clothes on a muddy rodeo field — is given exactly the same weight. The comedy is equally flat." Aaron Beierle of DVD Talk wrote, "The film at least boasts some good performances from the two leads; Hall and Barton capture the emotions and drama nicely."

=== Accolades ===
Award	Category	Nominee(s)	Result
DVD Exclusive Awards	Best Supporting Actress	Drew Barrymore	Nominated
