= Freerunner (film) =

- Movie poster
- Directed by: Lawrence Silverstein
- Written by: Matthew Chadwick; Raimund Huber; Jeremy Sklar
- Story by: Jeremy Sklar; Raimund Huber
- Produced by: Warren Ostergard Lawrence Silverstein
- Starring: Sean Faris; Danny Dyer; Tamer Hassan
- Cinematography: Claudio Chea
- Edited by: Marc Jakubowicz
- Production companies: Vitamin A Films; Strategic Film Partners
- Release date: September 15, 2011 (Oldenburg Film Festival)
- Country: United States
- Language: English

Freerunner is a 2011 action film by Lawrence Silverstein starring Sean Faris, Danny Dyer and Tamer Hassan in lead roles.

== Plot ==
Freerunner sees eight freerunners racing against time, to scan a collar on three check points across the city area within an hour. Each collar is fitted with an explosive which will detonate if they leave the green race zone, are the last runner to scan a checkpoint more than three seconds after the previous racer, or if the race owner, Mr. Frank (Dyer), manually detonates via remote device. The winner of the race is the first to make it to the final checkpoint within 60 minutes and will receive a prize of million dollars. The losers will all die.

The runners are chosen after performing in the local, non-lethal, races. Ryan (Faris), Kid Elvis, Mitch, Decks, Turk, West, Freebo and Finch are the eight runners chosen against their will to participate. International gangsters and businessmen place bets on the runners, before and throughout the race. Race activity is monitored by cameras throughout the race area and on each racer's collar.

== Cast ==
- Sean Faris as Ryan
- Danny Dyer as Mr. Frank
- Tamer Hassan as Reese
- Amanda Fuller as Dalores
- Seymour Cassel as Grampa
- Mariah Bonner as Deedee
- Casey Durkin as Stacey
- Ryan Doyle as Finch
- Dylan W. Baker as West
- Rebecca Da Costa as Chelsea

== Release ==
Frerunners was released in Germany on 15 September 2011 at Oldenburg International Film Festival. The film became available on DVD and Blu-ray in October 18, 2011.

=== DVD ===
DVD extra includes behind-the-scenes footage, a making-of featurette, a look at the stunts and fights, and some on-set B-roll featuring the actors playing a game called ninja and engaging in random parkour.

== Soundtrack ==
1. Let Us In! (Come On) – The Lions Rampant
2. Panther 1 – Slowride
3. At The Edgewater – Johnny Douglas
4. Caught Up In The Chase – Billy Livesay
5. Are You Ready For This – Kritical
6. Aloha vey – The Code
7. Final Hour Groove – Steve Kornicki
8. Oily Rags – Grant Fitch
9. Fast Lane – Freak i.v.
10. Back To My Old Habits – Rhiann Holly
11. Last Stand of Cornholio the Wicked – Grant Fitch
12. That’s The Way It’s Got To Be – Martin Guigui
13. Psycho Creep – Mark Cook
14. Bein’ Blue – Cassidy Cooper
15. Rocket Lab – Andrew Jed
16. Get A Real Woman – Amber (Church Of Disco mix)
17. Counter – Peter Groenwald
18. Lover Tonight – Joe Wolfe
19. End Run – Peter DiStefano
20. Harp Angel – CT Sox
21. Engergise – Earodynamics
22. Bullets – Protillus
