= Burning Bright (film) =

2010 film by Carlos Brooks

- Film poster
- Directed by: Carlos Brooks
- Written by: Christine Coyle Johnson; Julie Prendiville Roux
- Story by: David Higgins; Christine Coyle Johnson; Julie Prendiville Roux
- Produced by: Wayne Morris; Cami Winikoff
- Starring: Briana Evigan; Charlie Tahan; Garret Dillahunt
- Cinematography: Michael McDonough
- Edited by: Miklos Wright
- Music by: Zack Ryan
- Production companies: Sobini Films; Launchpad Productions
- Distributed by: Lionsgate
- Release date: August 17, 2010
- Running time: 86 minutes
- Country: United States
- Language: English

Burning Bright is a 2010 American horror thriller film directed by Carlos Brooks and starring Briana Evigan, Charlie Tahan, Garret Dillahunt, and Meat Loaf. The film depicts the attempts of a young woman and her younger autistic brother to ward off a hungry tiger trapped in a house with them during a hurricane. Distributed by Lionsgate, the film was released straight-to-DVD on August 17, 2010.

== Plot ==
With plans to open a safari park from home, John Gaveneau buys a Bengal tiger named Lucifer from a travelling circus. Meanwhile, his stepdaughter, Kelly Taylor, takes her autistic younger brother, Tom, to a special hospital to be cared for while she is away at college. However, Kelly's payment is rejected due to insufficient funds and, after contacting the bank, she learns John withdrew all the money to pay for the tiger.

After bringing Lucifer home, John instructs his workers to board up the house in preparation for an approaching hurricane. Kelly confronts him about the money, claiming their late mother, who had committed suicide, would want it to be used for Tom's care, but John refuses to return Lucifer, justifying that there was no official will. He tries to assure Kelly she can still leave Tom in his care. Kelly fails to defer from college for the third time and is warned by her professor that her scholarship will be given to someone else if she doesn't start that semester.

During the night, an unseen person releases Lucifer from his cage, letting him loose in the house, before the front door is boarded shut. Kelly wakes early the following morning and finds a note from John in the kitchen claiming to be at the store. Upon returning upstairs, Kelly hears noises and spots Lucifer crossing the foyer beneath her. Panicked, she retreats to Tom's room but finds his bed empty. After discovering the house is boarded up, she realizes she left her cell phone in her jeans in the laundry room.

Kelly sneaks downstairs to the laundry room and attempts to call 911, but is greeted by an automated message informing her of a high volume of calls due to the ongoing hurricane. She then tries to contact John, who is at a bar getting drunk. Following several close encounters with Lucifer, Kelly returns to the laundry room; she narrowly escapes by climbing up the chute. She finds Tom and struggles to protect him due to his hypersensitivities and meltdowns. Lucifer follows them into the master bedroom, where Kelly fails to contact help with the computer, and they both hide under the bed after Kelly spills perfume to mask their scent, but they are still attacked and barely escape.

Kelly leaves out raw meat laced with sleeping pills to distract Lucifer, but to no avail. Back upstairs, she finds the attic nailed shut, so she and Tom hide in a storage cupboard. When Lucifer corners them, Kelly uses a crowbar to break a hole through the wall for them to crawl out into the hallway, but not before the tiger injures her leg. While hiding in John's study, Kelly discovers he has taken out life insurance policies on both her and Tom, and intends to collect the money upon their deaths. She then finds John's gun and five bullets.

Downstairs, Kelly attempts to shoot Lucifer but the first chamber is empty, leading the tiger to chase her through the house. Tom is distracted watching a home video of his mother and refuses to leave. Back in the laundry room, Kelly is able to break the board-covered window and climbs out just as Lucifer breaks in and leaps to attack her. She makes it to her car but remembers that Tom is still alone with Lucifer and returns to the house. Upon finding him, Kelly comforts Tom over their mother's suicide and promises that she will never abandon him.

With Tom's cooperation, Kelly regroups and creates a makeshift torch, which she uses to fight off Lucifer as they are attacked on their way back to the laundry room via the kitchen. She instructs Tom to climb into an empty chest freezer; safe from Lucifer, Kelly hums Tom a lullaby and he falls asleep.

The next morning, Kelly wakes to John removing the board from the front door with a drill, realizing it was him who trapped them inside. John reveals Kelly and Tom's mother was going to leave him so he actually murdered her, then removed her children from her life insurance. Suddenly, Lucifer attacks and mauls John to death. The tiger then proceeds to eat his corpse, allowing Kelly and Tom to sneak out of the house. Standing outside among debris from the hurricane, Tom takes Kelly's hand and they begin to walk away together.

== Cast ==
- Briana Evigan as Kelly Taylor
- Charlie Tahan as Tom Taylor
- Garret Dillahunt as John "Johnny" Gaveneau
- Peggy Sheffield as Doctor Orsi
- Mary Rachel Dudley as Catherine Taylor
- Tom Nowicki as Sheriff
- Meat Loaf as Howie (uncredited)
- Katie, Schicka and Kismet as the tiger (uncredited)

== Production ==
The film was shot in Florida, with production beginning in July 2008. The film had obtained a SAG waiver to continue work during an expected strike.

== Reception ==
In a retrospective review, Bloody Disgusting's Paul Lê wrote that the film "had become a shining example of how to follow through on a high concept," with "solid direction and performances." Joshua Miller, writing for CHUD, called it "an entertaining and at times surprisingly good film" that "is always threatening to become a really great flick" without ever fulfilling its promise. In a four star review, Duncan Bowles of Den of Geek wrote that the film, while "obviously no masterpiece," had a strong cast and genuine scares that "make for a thoroughly entertaining movie." For DVD Talk, Rohit Rao wrote that the film "rises above' its B movie premise with intelligent characters and "turns an unstoppable force of nature into something even more identifiable and terrifying."
