= Earthquake in New York =

- Genre: Action; Crime; Drama
- Written by: Michael Sloane; D. Brent Mote
- Directed by: Terry Ingram
- Starring: Greg Evigan
- Theme music composer: Christophe Beck
- Country of origin: United States
- Original language: English

Production
- Executive producers: Lance H. Robbins; Michael Sloan; Drew S. Levin
- Producer: Gavin Mitchell
- Production locations: New York City; Toronto
- Cinematography: Barry Bergthorson
- Editor: Mike Lee
- Running time: 94 min.
- Production company: Saban Entertainment

Original release
- Network: Fox Family Channel
- Release: October 11, 1998

Earthquake in New York is an American television movie that aired on Fox Family Channel on Sunday October 11, 1998, from 8:00 p.m. to 10:00 p.m. ET. The film's tagline is "In a city torn apart, a family comes together".

== Plot ==
After a magnitude 8.2 earthquake strikes New York City, cop John Ryker, searches for his wife Laura and his two children, Andrew and Carla, in the rubble, while also hunting a serial killer.

== Cast ==
- Greg Evigan as John Rykker
- Cynthia Gibb as Laura Rykker
- Melissa Sue Anderson as Dr. Marilyn Blake
- Michael Moriarty as Police Captain Paul Stenning
- Götz Otto as Eric Steadman
- Dylan Provencher as Andrew Rykker
- Michael Sarrazin as Dr. Robert Trask
