= Briana Evigan =

American actress (born 1986)

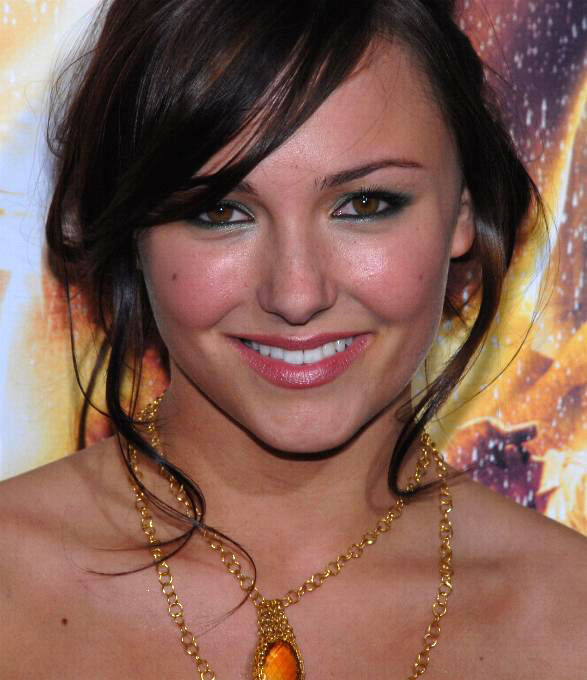
- Evigan at the premiere of Step Up 2: The Streets, 2008
- Born: October 23, 1986 (age 40); Los Angeles, California, U.S.
- Education: Los Angeles Valley College
- Occupations: Actress; dancer
- Years active: 1996–present
- Spouse: Damien Mander
- Children: 2
- Father: Greg Evigan
- Relatives: Vanessa Lee Evigan (sister); Jason Evigan (brother)

Briana Evigan (born October 23, 1986) is an American actress and dancer best known for her lead roles as Andrea "Andie" West in the dance film Step Up 2: The Streets (2008) and its sequel Step Up: All In (2014), and Ms. Kathleen Merrywood in the musical horror film The Devil's Carnival (2012) and its sequel Alleluia! The Devil's Carnival (2016).

Evigan has since been noted as a scream queen for appearing in numerous horror and thriller films such as S. Darko, Sorority Row (both 2009), Burning Bright, Mother's Day (both 2010), Stash House, Mine Games (both 2012), and River Runs Red (2018). She is also known for her recurring role as Sonja Lam on the second season of the El Rey Network horror drama series From Dusk till Dawn: The Series (2015).

== Early and personal life ==
Evigan was born in Los Angeles, California, the daughter of Pamela C. Serpe, a dancer, model, and actress, and actor Greg Evigan. She has Polish (from her paternal grandmother) and Italian (from her maternal grandfather) heritage. She is the youngest of three siblings, with sister Vanessa and brother Jason. She has studied dance since she was nine. She is one of the singers and plays keyboards in the group Moorish Idol. In October 2023, she married Australian anti-poaching activist Damien Mander, with whom she has two children, son, born in 2022. And daughter, born in September 21, 2026.

== Career ==
A professional dancer, Evigan has appeared in music videos for Linkin Park, Flo Rida, T-Pain and Enrique Iglesias. She has also had small roles in television series and films such as Bottom's Up, Something Sweet and Fear Itself. In 2008, she won the breakout role of Andie West in the sequel to the 2006 dance drama Step Up, Step Up 2: The Streets. Filming took place in late 2007 in Baltimore and was released February 14, 2008. The film, which met with negative reviews with Rotten Tomatoes (receiving 24%), achieved box office success earning a worldwide gross of $148,424,320. Both Evigan and co-star Robert Hoffman earned the Best Kiss Award at the 2008 MTV Movie Awards.

In 2009, S. Darko, a sequel to the 2001 cult-hit horror Donnie Darko, was released. Evigan played Samantha Darko's best friend, Corey. The film stars James Lafferty and Ed Westwick. A theatrical release was scrapped and was released Straight-to-DVD on May 12, 2009. Unlike Donnie Darko, the film received negative reviews. In August 2008, Summit Entertainment announced Evigan has signed on to portray the central character Cassidy Tappan in the remake of the low-budget horror film Sorority Row. The screenplay was written by Good Luck Chuck writer Josh Stolberg and directed by Stewart Hendler. The film was budgeted at $12,500,000. Evigan stars alongside Audrina Patridge, Rumer Willis and Jamie Chung. Sorority Row was released on September 11, 2009, and debuted at No. 6 at the box office and earned worldwide $26,735,797. Critical reception was mixed to negative. Evigan's performance was well received by critics. The leading female cast members earned a ShoWest Award for "Female Stars of Tomorrow" in April 2009. The DVD release was February 23, 2010.

In January 2009, Evigan was confirmed by Lionsgate to star in Burning Bright. She plays the lead female role, Kelly Taylor. In the film, "A young woman and her autistic brother find themselves trapped in their house with a ravenous tiger during a hurricane". Critical reception was extremely positive. Despite this, the film was announced to be released Straight-to-DVD on August 17, 2010. In February 2009, Evigan announced in an interview she has signed on for another remake. The film will be a remake of the cult slasher horror film Mother's Day and will be directed by Darren Lynn Bousman, best known for his work with previous Lionsgate films such as the Saw trilogy. Bousman previously directed Evigan in an episode of Fear Itself in 2008. The film will co-star A. J. Cook and Jaime King. The film has suffered numerous push backs, and was finally released on May 8, 2012, on DVD and Blu-ray. The film was also part of the 2010 Cannes Film Festival. Evigan played the central character in the indie drama romance film Subject: I Love You.

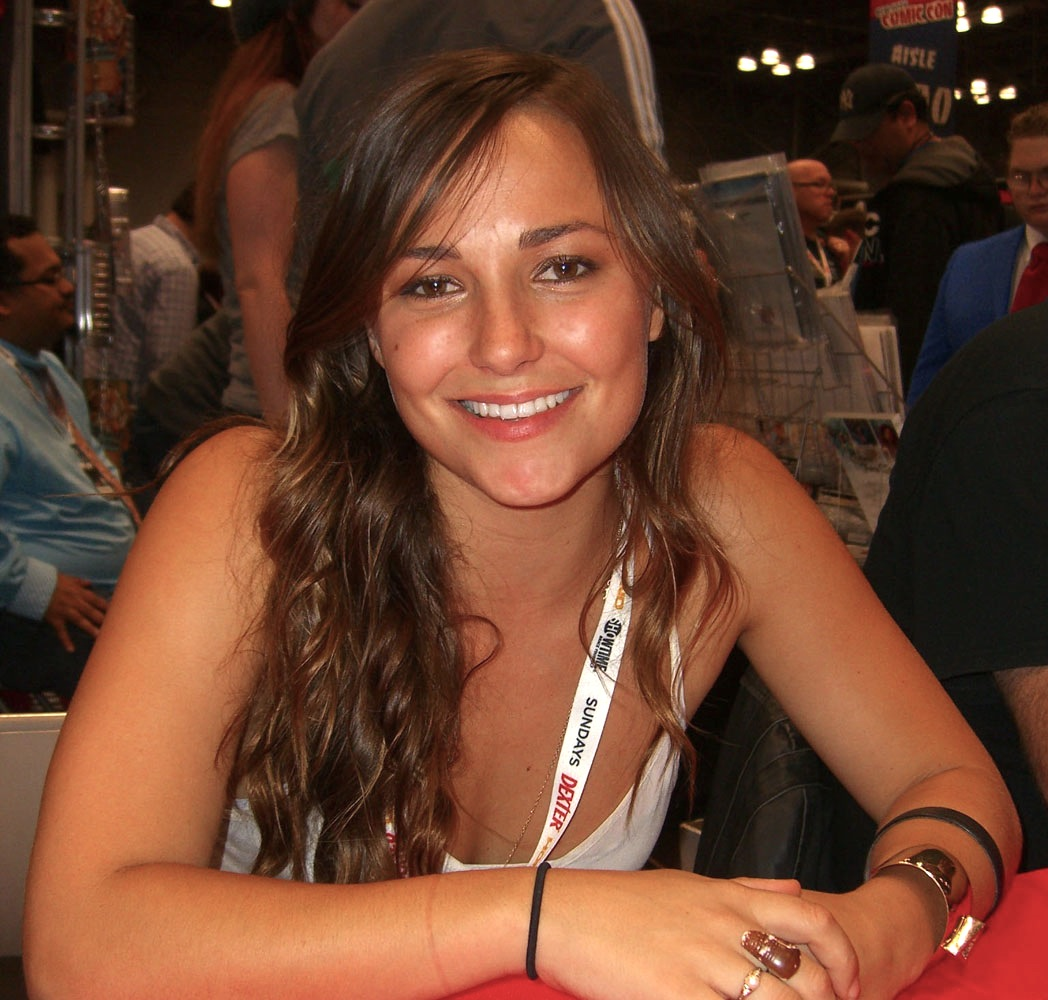
Evigan at the New York Comic Con, 2012

She stars in The Devil's Carnival, a short film that got a 30 city world tour that began on April 15, 2012. Evigan later confirmed that she had reprised her role in its sequel, The Devil's Carnival: Alleluia!, which was released in late 2015. In 2011, during a UStream, Evigan announced that she was working in a TV series with her family, though nothing has been confirmed yet. She was scheduled to star as the protagonist of Left for Red: Betrayal, the first of a trilogy which centered on a young woman seeking vengeance on the soldiers who sold her to a sex trafficking group, but has been shelved due to budget issues.

In 2014, Evigan reprised her role as Andie West in the fifth installment of the Step Up series, Step Up: All In. She was later cast in Love Is All You Need? as Jude, a heterosexual woman living in a world where homosexuality is right, and heterosexuality is the wrong. In 2015, Evigan announced, via Twitter that she would be recurring, alongside Danny Trejo in the second season of the Action-Vampire TV Series From Dusk till Dawn: The Series as Sonja, "an American expatriate working as a tattoo artist in a Mexican Mercado – who also has a sideline forging papers and passports out of her back room". The season premiered August 25, 2015, on El Rey. In 2017, she joined director James Kicklighter's Angel of Anywhere, with co-stars David A. Gregory, Ser'Darius Blain and introducing Axel Roldos. In 2023, Evigan collaborated with Veldskoen Shoes, a South African shoe brand to create "MoveMe" Ranger boots.

== Filmography ==
=== Film ===
Year	Title	Role	Notes
1996	Spectre	Aubrey South	Also known as House of the Damned and Escape to Nowhere
2006	Bottoms Up	High School Girl	
2008	Step Up 2: The Streets	Andrea "Andie" West	
2009	S. Darko	Corey Richardson	
2009	Sorority Row	Cassidy Tappan	
2010	Burning Bright	Kelly Taylor	
2010	Monster Heroes	Svector Orlaff	
2010	Mother's Day	Annette Langston	Co-wrote and sang end credit song Better Than Yesterday
2011	Subject: I Love You	Butterfly	
2012	Mine Games	Lyla	
2012	Rites of Passage	Penelope	
2012	Stash House	Emma Nash	
2012	The Devil's Carnival	Ms. Kathleen Merrywood	
2013	She Loves Me Not	Charlotte	
2014	Lap Dance	Tasha	
2014	Paranormal Island	Ivy	
2014	Puncture Wounds	Tanya	also known as A Certain Justice
2014	Step Up: All In	Andrea "Andie" West	
2016	Alleluia! The Devil's Carnival	Ms. Kathleen Merrywood	
2016	Love Is All You Need?	Jude Klein	
2016	Monday at 11:01 A.M.	Olivia	
2016	ToY	Chloe	
2018	My Husband's Secret Wife	Melanie	
2018	River Runs Red	Marilyn	
2019	Love in the Rain	Michelle	Short
2022	Love and Communication	Megan	
2022	Ask Me to Dance	Jill	
2022	Four Hour Layover in Juarez	Ashley	Short

=== Television ===
Year	Title	Role	Notes
2008	Fear Itself	Helen	Episode: "New Year's Day"
2012	A Star for Christmas	Cassie Drake	Television film (Ion)
2013	Longmire	Brandy	Episode: "Carcasses"
2015	From Dusk till Dawn: The Series	Sonja Lam	Recurring role; 8 episodes
2015	Once Upon a Holiday	Katherine "Katie" Hollington	Television film (Hallmark)
2017	The Good Nanny	Summer Pratt	Television film (Lifetime)

=== Music videos ===
Year	Title	Artist
2003	"Numb"	Linkin Park
2008	"Low"	Flo Rida featuring T-Pain
2008	"Push"	Enrique Iglesias featuring Lil Wayne
2008	"Church"	T-Pain
2008	"I Don't Think When I Dance"	Herself
2009	"Get U Home"	Shwayze
2018	"Give Me Your Hand"	Shannon K
2020	"Never Alone" (Paul Oakenfold & Varun Remix)	Emmanuel Kelly

== Awards and nominations ==
Year	Award	Category	Work	Result	Refs
2008	MTV Movie Awards	Best Kiss (with Robert Hoffman)	Step Up 2: The Streets	Won	
2008	Teen Choice Awards	Choice Movie Breakout Female	Step Up 2: The Streets	Nominated	
2009	Sho West Awards	Female Star of Tomorrow (with Leah Pipes, Rumer Willis, Jamie Chung, Audrina Patridge and Margo Harshman)	Sorority Row	Won	
2016	FilmOut Audience Awards	Best Actress	ToY	Won	
2023	Vegas Movie Awards	Best Woman Filmmaker	MoveMe South Africa	Won	
