= Joey Travolta (album) =

Studio album by Joey Travolta
- Released: 1978
- Studios: Hit Factory, New York City; Sigma Sound, Philadelphia, Pennsylvania
- Genres: Disco, pop
- Label: Millenium
- Producer: John Davis

Joey Travolta chronology
Joey Travolta (1978)	I Can't Forget You (1979)

Joey Travolta is the 1978 debut album of Joey Travolta. The album's advance single, issued 1 May 1978, was Travolta's rendition of "I Don't Wanna Go" which in 1977 had been a top ten R&B hit for the Moments: Travolta's version, promoted on the American Bandstand broadcast of 20 May 1978, almost afforded the singer a top 40 hit, peaking at No. 43 on the Billboard Hot 100. The album's second single, "If This Is Love", was issued concurrently with the album in September 1978.

== Track listing ==
1. "You Matter to Me" (John Vastano, Michael Morgan) - 2:40
2. "If This Is Love" (Robbie Patton, Kerry Chater) - 3:50
3. "Listen to Your Heart" (Charlie Black, Rory Bourke) - 3:11
4. "The Magic Is You" (John Davis) - 4:45
5. "I Don't Wanna Go" (Carole Bayer Sager, Bruce Roberts) - 3:20
6. "I'd Rather Leave While I'm in Love" (Peter Allen, Bayer Sager) - 2:55
7. "Let's Pretend" (Eric Carmen) - 3:27
8. "Steal Away Again" (Bayer Sager, Roberts, Bette Midler) - 3:09
9. "I Don't Want to Be Lonely" (Patton, Linda Mallah) - 3:09
10. "Something's Up (Love Me Like the First Time)" (Gary Benson) - 3:01
11. "This Time You're Really Mine" (Davis, Joey Travolta) - 3:12
