= Take It Like a Man (Dragonette song) =

"Take It Like A Man"

Single by Dragonette

from the album Galore
- B-side: "Teacher Teacher"
- Released: July 23, 2007
- Recorded: 2005–2006
- Genre: Electropop; new wave; synth-pop
- Length: 3:02
- Label: Mercury
- Songwriter(s): Sorbara, Kurtz, Steve Chrisanthou, Pete Prilesnik

Dragonette singles chronology
"I Get Around" (2007)	"Take It Like A Man" (2007)	"Fixin' To Thrill" (2009)

"Take It Like A Man" is a song by Canadian electronic group Dragonette, released as the second single from their debut studio album, Galore (2007). It reached a peak position of number 112 on the UK Singles Chart.

== Critical reception ==
Overall, the song received mostly positive reviews. Jonathan Keefe of Slant Magazine noted and complimented the song's complicated D/S dynamics, matched against a sugary, playful melody. Heather Pheres of AllMusic compared the song to previous works of Gwen Stefani, and new age rock band The Killers.

== Music video ==
The music video, based on 1970s-era pornographic tropes, was directed by Ben Taylor, and premiered on Dragonette's official YouTube channel on June 26, 2007. Dragonette described the video as "very saucy".

== Charts ==
Chart (2007)	Peak position
UK Singles Chart	112

== Track listing ==
=== CD single ===
(Released July 23, 2007)

No.	Title	Length
1.	"Take It Like A Man"	3:02
2.	"Teacher Teacher"	3:08
3.	"Take It Like A Man (Braxe & Falke Remix)"	6:47
4.	"Take It Like A Man (Music video)"	3:11
5.	"At Home With Dragonette"	6:31

=== Promo maxi ===
No.	Title	Length
1.	"Take It Like A Man (Hoxton Whores Remix)"	6:24
2.	"Take It Like A Man (Bimbo Jones Remix)"	7:15
3.	"Take It Like A Man (Braxe & Falke Remix)"	6:47
4.	"Take It Like A Man (Kissy Sell Out Mix)"	6:33
5.	"Take It Like A Man (Felix Cartal Remix)"	6:32
6.	"Take It Like A Man (Album Version)"	6:32

=== 12" single ===
No.	Title	Length
1.	"Take It Like A Man (Braxe & Falke Remix)"	6:47
2.	"Take It Like A Man (Kissy Sellout's Horror Sequel Remix)"	6:35

=== 7" single ===
(Released July 23, 2007)

No.	Title	Length
1.	"Take It Like A Man"	3:02
2.	"Take It Like A Man (Felix Cartal Remix)"	6:03
