= I Get Around (Dragonette song) =

2007 song

Single by Dragonette

from the album Galore
- B-side: "Shockbox"
- Released: April 30, 2007
- Recorded: 2005
- Genre: Electropop; synth-pop
- Length: 3:28
- Label: Mercury
- Songwriter(s): Martina Sorbara; Dan Kurtz
- Producer(s): Dragonette

Dragonette singles chronology
"I Get Around" (2007)	"Take It Like a Man" (2007)

"I Get Around" is the debut single by Canadian electronic music band Dragonette, released on April 30, 2007 from their debut studio album, Galore (2007). The track first appeared as an early working on Dragonette's self-released 2005 eponymous EP.

== Track listings ==
- CD single
1. "I Get Around" – 3:33
2. "Shockbox" – 4:03
3. "I Get Around" (Trophy Twins 24 Mix) – 7:13
4. "I Get Around" (music video)
- Digital EP
1. "I Get Around" – 3:33
2. "Shockbox" – 4:03
3. "I Get Around" (Trophy Twins 24 Remix) – 7:13
- Digital download – remixes
1. "I Get Around" (Midnight Juggernauts Remix) – 5:54
2. "I Get Around" (Oliver Koletski Remix) – 6:18
3. "I Get Around" (RTNY Remix) – 6:53
4. "I Get Around" (Van She Vocal) – 5:32
5. "I Get Around" (Van She Dub) – 5:33
6. "I Get Around" (Ratcliffe Remix) – 6:20
7. "I Get Around" (Ratcliffe 9AM Dub) – 6:54
8. "I Get Around" (Loose Cannons Dirty Toilet Sex Dub) – 8:25
- 7" colored vinyl
1. "I Get Around" (Van She Tech Dub Remix) – 5:33
- 12" picture disc

A1. "I Get Around" (Ratcliffe Mix) – 6:20
A2. "I Get Around" (Van She Tech Remix)
B1. "I Get Around" (RTNY Remix) – 6:53
B2. "I Get Around" (Trophy Twins 24 Mix) – 7:13

== Credits and personnel ==
Credits adapted from the liner notes of Galore.

- Dragonette – production
- Martina Sorbara – vocals, songwriting
- Dan Kurtz – bass, guitar, keyboards, programming, songwriting
- Joel Stouffer – drums
- Simon Craig – guitar
- Dan Grech-Marguerat – mixing
- Ted Jensen – mastering
- Eric Ratz – drum recording

== Charts ==
Chart (2007)	Peak position
Canada (Canadian Hot 100)	57
UK Singles (OCC)	92

== Release history ==
Region	Date	Format	Label	Ref.
United Kingdom	April 30, 2007	CD single; digital download; 7" single; 12" single	Mercury	
Canada	May 7, 2007	CD single	Universal	
Canada	August 28, 2007	Digital download	Interscope	
