= The Right Kind of Wrong (film) =

2013 film by Jeremiah Chechik

- US theatrical release poster
- Directed by: Jeremiah Chechik
- Written by: Megan Martin
- Based on: Sex and Sunsets by Tim Sandlin
- Produced by: Stephen Alix; Robert Lantos
- Starring: Ryan Kwanten; Sara Canning; Will Sasso; Catherine O'Hara
- Cinematography: Luc Montpellier
- Edited by: Christopher Donaldson
- Music by: Rachel Portman
- Production companies: Serendipity Point Films; Nomadic Pictures
- Distributed by: Entertainment One
- Release dates: 12 September 2013 (TIFF); 11 October 2013 (Canada)
- Running time: 97 minutes
- Country: Canada
- Language: English

The Right Kind of Wrong is a 2013 Canadian romantic comedy film directed by Jeremiah Chechik and written by Megan Martin, based on the 1987 novel Sex and Sunsets by Tim Sandlin. Its premiere was in the Gala Presentation section at the 2013 Toronto International Film Festival.

== Plot ==
Leo, a failed writer and recent divorcee, now works as a dishwasher in the restaurant of his friend, Mandeep. His former wife, Julie, has written a blog about Leo entitled "Why You Suck", which has gone on to be published and become a top selling book. Leo also has a crippling fear of heights.

Leo falls in love with Colette when he first sees her about to enter the church on her wedding day. He decides to win her heart, pursuing her despite scorn from his friends and from Colette's new husband, Danny.

== Cast ==
- Ryan Kwanten as Leo Palamino
- Sara Canning as Colette Hart
- Will Sasso as Neil
- Catherine O'Hara as Tess, Colette's mother
- Kristen Hager as Julie Deere, Leo's ex-wife
- Ryan McPartlin as Danny Hart, Colette's husband
- James A. Woods as Troy Cooper
- Barb Mitchell as Angie
- Jennifer Baxter as Jill
- Raoul Bhaneja as Mandeep
- Anna Quick as Chrissy

== Reception ==
=== Box office ===
The film received a limited release in theatres in March 2014, earning box office of $2,098.

=== Critical response ===
The review aggregation website Rotten Tomatoes reported a 12% approval rating with an average rating of 3.4/10 based on 17 reviews. Metacritic, which uses a weighted average, assigned a score of 30 out of 100 based on 6 reviews, indicating "generally unfavorable reviews".
