= Joey Travolta =

American actor (born 1950)

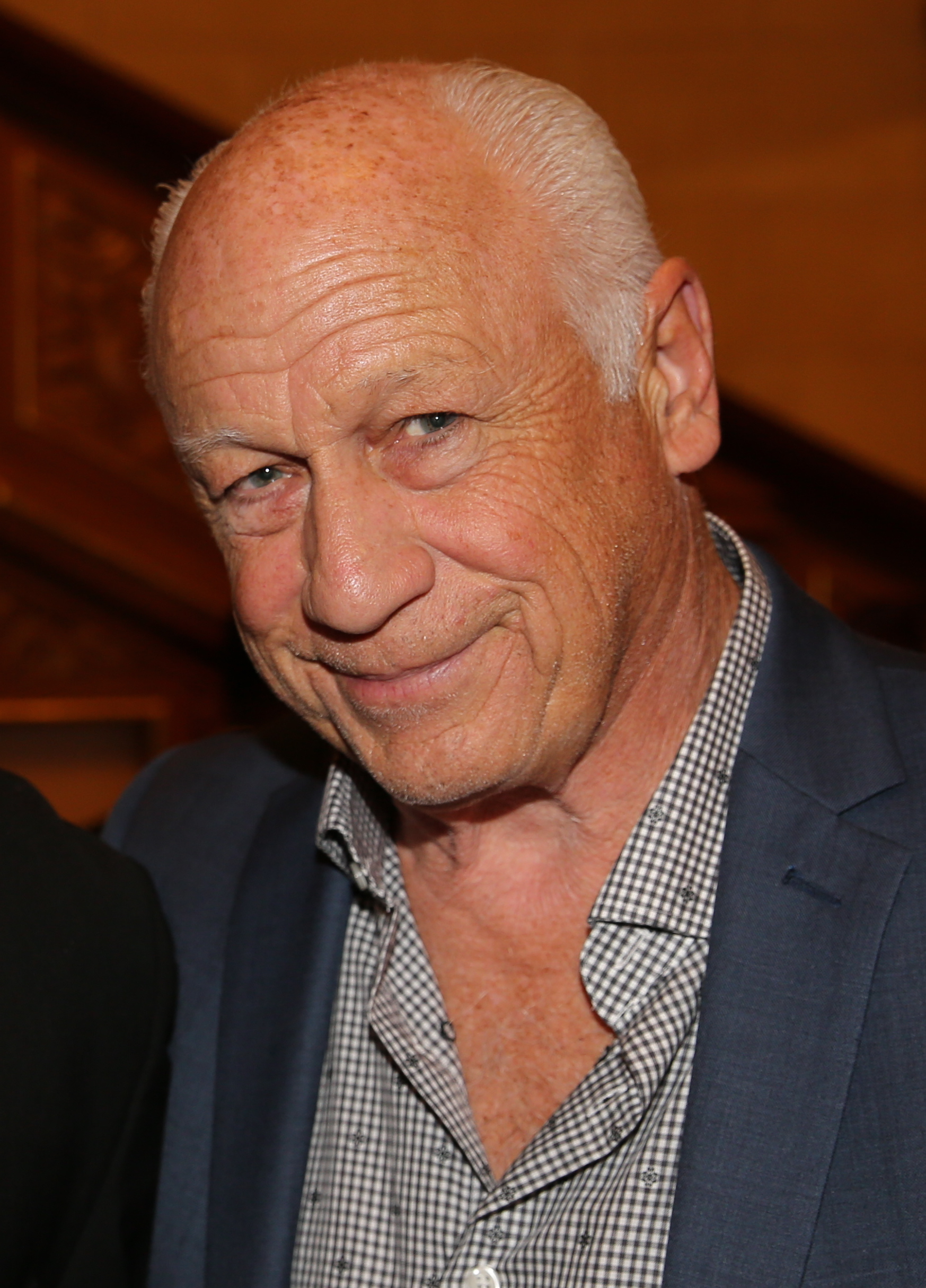
- Travolta in 2018
- Born: Joseph Allen Travolta; October 14, 1950 (age 75); Englewood, New Jersey, U.S.
- Occupations: Actor; singer; producer; director; writer
- Years active: 1979–present
- Spouse: Wendy Shawn (m. 1980)
- Children: 1
- Relatives: John Travolta (brother); Ellen Travolta (sister); Margaret Travolta (sister); Dick Shawn (father-in-law)

Joseph Allen Travolta (born October 14, 1950) is an American actor. He is the elder brother of actor John Travolta.

== Early life ==
Travolta was born and raised in Englewood, New Jersey, a nearby suburb of New York City, where he attended Dwight Morrow High School. His father, Salvatore Travolta, was a semi-professional football player turned tire salesman and partner in a tire company. His mother, Helen Cecilia (née Burke; 1912–1978), was an actress and singer who had appeared in The Sunshine Sisters, a radio vocal group, and acted and directed before becoming a high school drama and English teacher. His father was a second-generation Italian American and his mother was Irish American. He is one of six children including actors John Travolta, Ellen Travolta and Margaret Travolta.

He graduated from Paterson State College with a degree in special education in 1974.

== Career ==
Travolta began a singing career in 1978 as a recording artist on Casablanca Records, releasing his eponymous album. The following year he made his acting debut starring in the feature film Sunnyside for Filmways Productions. He then became a guest star in the 1980s television show Simon & Simon (episode: "The Hottest Ticket in Town").

Additional acting credits include work with director John Landis on multiple feature film projects: Amazon Women on the Moon, Beverly Hills Cop III, Oscar, and Susan's Plan. He was also a series regular on the WB television hit Movie Stars.

Stage performances include starring roles in Bye Bye Birdie, Guys and Dolls, and West Side Story. He wrote and directed Diva Las Vegas in 1989, which went on to win the Italian Funny Film Festival.

In 1991, Joey Travolta produced and starred in Da Vinci's War. He later produced and starred in the sequel, To the Limit. He made directing his main priority in 1994. He directed the action thrillers Hard Vice and Navajo Blues. Subsequent titles include Earth Minus Zero, Laws of Deception, Detour, Mel, Partners, Enemies of Laughter, and Waiting to Live.

For television audiences he directed the police drama L.A. Heat, Friday Night After the Movies, and the syndicated Disney series Honey, I Shrunk The Kids. He has directed music videos as well such as Aqua's Doctor Jones and Latvia's entry in the Eurovision Song Contest 2008 titled Pirates of the Sea.

== Disability advocate ==
Travolta has worked as a disability education teacher in New Jersey. In 2005, he produced a documentary film called Normal People Scare Me, directed by a 15-year-old autistic boy whom he mentored. Around this time, he founded Inclusion Films, which involve individuals with disabilities in the process of making films.

He has collaborated with a non-profit organization called HEAL to form a Jacksonville, Florida based HEAL Film Camp with Joey Travolta.

In 2019, Travolta directed Carol of the Bells for Inclusion Films starring R.J. Mitte as an adoptee who discovers his biological mother has Down Syndrome. Seventy percent of the crew had developmental disabilities. The film won the Audience Award for Best Feature at the 2019 San Diego International Film Festival. His next feature film titled Let's Work premiered at SDIFF in the documentary competition in October 2020. Travolta’s Inclusion Films continues to employ disabled filmmakers.

== Personal life ==
Travolta is married to Wendy Shawn, daughter of comedian Dick Shawn.
