= Wes Miller (director) =

American film director

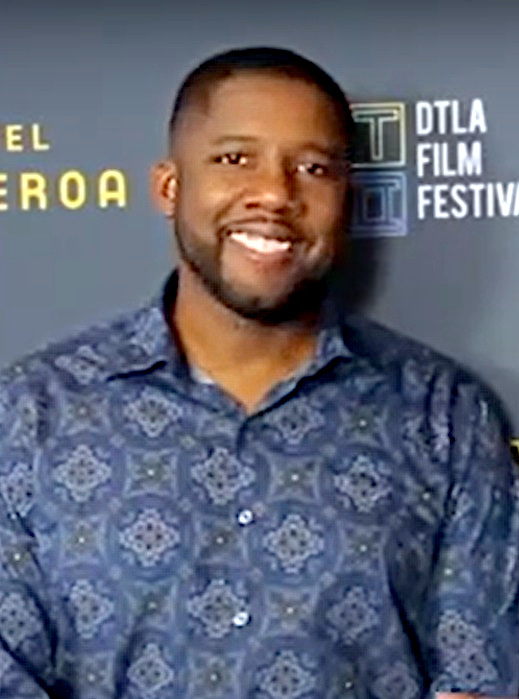
- Miller at the DTLA Film Festival in 2018
- Occupations: Film director, screenwriter, producer

Wes Miller is an American film director, screenwriter and producer. Having previously been a civil rights attorney, he has directed films such as River Runs Red (2018), Hell on the Border (2019), A Day to Die (2022) and Call Her King (2023). The themes of his films often involve questions of justice, violence, race and personal responsibility, mostly in the action and thriller genres.

== Early life and legal career ==
Miller was brought up in Memphis, Tennessee, and took part in a number of sports before going to college. He played football before obtaining a legal education. Prior to joining the film industry, he had a career as a trial attorney, which included work on civil rights cases.

Even though Miller had remained interested in filmmaking, he at first chose a career in law. He gradually decided to enter the film industry after he had started making short films and studied the practical side of film production.

Miller has explained in interviews how the availability of affordable digital filmmaking equipment enabled him to gain experience without substantial financial resources. Moreover, he came into contact with professional film production after one of his screenplays drew the attention of a producer.

In 2015 Miller quit his work in the legal field in order to devote himself entirely to filmmaking. He later stated that the experience he had as a lawyer had affected both the way he approached storytelling and his interest in conflicts relating to legal institutions, individual rights and moral responsibility.

== Film career ==
=== Early films ===
Following his work on several short films, Miller made his first venture into feature filmmaking with Lily Grace: A Witch Story (2015), a supernatural horror film made on a low budget.

He then made the drama Prayer Never Fails (2016), which told the story of a high school basketball coach who was involved in a legal dispute concerning religious expression. The film starred Corbin Bernsen, Lorenzo Lamas and Lynn Whitfield.

While continuing his work in independent filmmaking, Miller developed projects that merged action and suspense with social or legal issues. He spoke about the growing production budgets of his early films and the experience he had gained as a result of carrying out his successive projects in an interview with No Film School.

=== River Runs Red ===
The 2018 crime thriller River Runs Red was written and directed by Miller, with Taye Diggs, John Cusack and George Lopez in the cast. Miller was also credited as a producer.

The movie is about a judge whose son is killed in a clash with the police; after the officers concerned escape being punished, the judge takes part in a violent quest for justice.

Miller stated that the aim of the story was to examine what occurs when a person who believes in the justice system loses faith in its ability to ensure accountability. The film also dealt with issues relating to racial inequality and police violence.

The film was critically panned by a number of reviewers. Glenn Kenny, in his review for RogerEbert.com, criticised the way in which the film handled its subject matter and the way it was executed as a thriller.

=== Atone and Hell on the Border ===
In 2019 Miller made the action thriller Atone, featuring a former military operative and a violent hostage situation.

That same year he directed Hell on the Border, a Western based on the life of Bass Reeves, who was one of the first Black deputy United States marshals to serve west of the Mississippi River.

David Gyasi played the role of Reeves, with Ron Perlman and Frank Grillo also in the cast. Miller was credited as the film's director and screenwriter.

He stated that he became interested in Reeves because the lawman's achievements had received relatively little attention in popular entertainment. After making River Runs Red, which looked at failures within the justice system, he wished to show a historical figure who stood for a different view of law enforcement.

=== A Day to Die ===
The 2022 action thriller A Day to Die was directed by Miller, with Kevin Dillon, Bruce Willis, Frank Grillo and Leon Robinson in the cast.

The movie centres on a former military operative who has to obtain a large amount of money after his wife is kidnapped. Miller also acted as a producer on the film.

Filming occurred in Mississippi, with locations both in and around Jackson.

In his interview with Selling Your Screenplay, Miller talked about the difficulties of directing action sequences, working with well-known actors and handling the production of an independent action film. He also explained how his previous filmmaking experience had affected his method of directing the project.

This film was the first time that Miller had worked with Robinson. As stated in an interview published by The Birmingham Times in October 2026, Miller had approached Robinson during the film's pre-production phase and had been particularly interested in the actor's ability to bring greater complexity to one of the film's antagonists.

They then stayed in contact with each other and later worked together on Wildcards.

=== Call Her King and Black Heat ===
In 2023 Miller directed the action thriller Call Her King, which was produced for the streaming service BET+.

The film features Naturi Naughton in the role of Jaeda King, a judge who finds herself at the centre of a violent takeover of a courthouse. The cast also includes Lance Gross and Jason Mitchell.

Miller devised the project with the aim of making a female-driven action film that would include aspects based on his time in the legal profession. He stated that his experience as a trial attorney had enabled him to understand the ethical dilemmas encountered by the main character.

Filming was carried out in government and courthouse buildings in New Jersey, which caused logistical difficulties for the production. In a 2023 interview with Fandomize, Miller spoke about the practical effects and the decision to use real locations.

He then directed Black Heat, an action thriller featuring Jason Mitchell, NLE Choppa and DreamDoll. The film tells the story of two parents trying to recover their missing daughter from a criminal organisation.

Although the film is listed under 2024 in some filmographies, it received a limited theatrical release in the United States on 28 March 2025. Miller was credited as director, screenwriter and producer.

Miller spoke to Urban Magazine about the making of the film and the effect of his legal background on his work.

=== Later projects ===
In 2026 Miller directed and wrote the science-fiction thriller Kill the Girl, the plot of which revolves around an abduction and a conspiracy linked to time travel.

The film stars Liz Fenning, Joseph O'Connor, Henry Temple and Gracie Winchester.

He also wrote and directed Wildcards, a courtroom drama featuring Leon Robinson, Elise Neal and Aries Spears.

The film is about a young man from a wealthy family who is accused of sexually assaulting a Black woman. It deals with the courtroom proceedings as well as the discussions of jurors whose various backgrounds and prejudices influence the way they understand the evidence.

Miller made use of his experience as a civil rights attorney, specifically his time waiting for jury verdicts. Robinson, having previously worked with Miller on A Day to Die, was involved in shaping the premise.

In 2026 Wildcards received advance screenings in a number of American cities, together with discussions involving the cast, filmmakers and legal experts.

At a screening in Birmingham, Alabama, in September, Miller and Robinson took part in a discussion about the film's themes and the importance of jury service.

The Birmingham Times reported that the film's official release was planned for 2027 following its advance screening tour.

== Themes and approach ==
Miller has often dealt with the relationship between individuals and institutions of authority. His background as a civil rights attorney has influenced his interest in stories concerning justice, law enforcement, personal responsibility and social conflict.

River Runs Red looks at the breakdown of trust in the justice system, Hell on the Border depicts a historical Black law enforcement officer, and both Call Her King and Wildcards use courtroom settings to examine legal and moral conflicts.

Miller has, in interviews, talked about his desire to combine these subjects with popular commercial genres, especially action films and thrillers. He has also mentioned the difficulties of financing independent productions and creating opportunities for underrepresented performers and filmmakers.

== Filmography ==
The following table lists Miller's feature films and television films as a director. Production years and release dates do not always coincide.

Feature films and television films
Year	Title	Director	Writer	Producer	Distributor or release
2015	Lily Grace: A Witch Story	Yes		Yes	
2016	Prayer Never Fails	Yes	Yes	Yes	
2018	River Runs Red	Yes	Yes	Yes	Cinedigm
2019	Atone	Yes	Yes	Yes	
2019	Hell on the Border	Yes	Yes		
2022	A Day to Die	Yes		Yes	Vertical Entertainment
2022	Honey + Lemon	Yes			
2023	Call Her King	Yes		Yes	BET+
2025	Black Heat	Yes	Yes	Yes	Limited theatrical release; also listed as a 2024 production
2026	Kill the Girl	Yes	Yes	Yes	
2026	Wildcards	Yes	Yes	Yes	Advance screenings; official release planned for 2027
