= Ambushed (2013 film) =

- Promotional release poster
- Directed by: Giorgio Serafini
- Written by: Agustin
- Produced by: Agustin; Gianni Capaldi; Randy Couture; Phillip B. Goldfine; Dolph Lundgren
- Starring: Dolph Lundgren; Vinnie Jones; Randy Couture
- Cinematography: Marco Cappetta
- Edited by: Scott Evans
- Music by: Brian Jackson Harris; Justin Raines; Michael Wickstrom
- Production companies: Creamovies; Hollywood Media Bridge
- Distributed by: Voltage Pictures; Anchor Bay Films
- Release date: September 28, 2013
- Running time: 96 minutes
- Country: United States
- Language: English

Ambushed is a 2013 American action thriller film directed by Giorgio Serafini, written by Agustin, and starring Dolph Lundgren, Vinnie Jones, Randy Couture, Gianni Capaldi, and Daniel Bonjour. Lundgren, Jones, and Capaldi would go on to work with Serafini in Blood of Redemption and Puncture Wounds.

== Plot ==
Mid-level drug dealers Eddie and Frank grow restless with their limited growth potential and set up a meeting with their supplier, Madsen. Instead of negotiating, Frank impulsively murders Madsen and takes his cocaine. Eddie's excitement quickly turns to apprehension when he hears about Madsen's death, but Frank talks him into bluffing their way back into drug lord Vincent Camastra's good graces. At the same time, dirty cop Jack Reiley investigates the murder and is annoyed when DEA agent Maxwell takes over the investigation. As Frank attempts to save his relationship with his naive girlfriend, Ashley, Reiley violently bullies his informants for information, and Camastra sends assassins to kill Eddie. After Eddie engages in a brief gunfight with the assassins, Camastra himself beats Eddie unconscious. Ashley, who has become suspicious of Frank's secretive lifestyle, is shocked when Kathy and Beverly, Eddie's friends, interrupt them to explain that Camastra has kidnapped Eddie.

Beverly, an undercover DEA agent, is in a relationship with Maxwell, who is concerned that she has gone too deep. However, she protests when he requests that she abandon the case. Beverly and Maxwell expand their investigation to include Reiley, but they are forbidden from taking action until they can also get Camastra. Frustrated, they bide their time until Camastra makes his move. Frank visits Camastra, and Eddie successfully buys them two days time to pay Camastra back. At the nightclub Frank owns, Reiley attempts to blackmail him, only to be shot in his hand and left on the side of the road. Unable to explain his predicament, Reiley is put on unpaid leave and learns that Internal Affairs is preparing a case against him. Forced to abandon his plans to retire comfortably, Reiley becomes even more unstable and kidnaps Ashley. He breaks into Eddie's apartment, takes Kathy and Beverly hostage, and waits for Frank and Eddie to return.

As Maxwell and his team race to the apartment, Frank and Eddie discuss their future plans. Frank wants to retire from the criminal life; Eddie, while wishing Frank well, says that he will stay in the business and take over. Frank admits that he will miss the excitement, but he wants a normal life with Ashley, whom he plans to marry. Frank, Eddie, and the DEA agents all enter the apartment within minutes of each other. Panicked, Reiley kills several people, including Eddie and Ashley. In the chaos, Beverly sets Kathy free, and Reiley and Frank escape. Maxwell corners Reiley, and they face off against each other; reinforcements arrive just as Maxwell subdues Reiley. In the last scene, Frank mourns the loss of Ashley and speculates on what he will do next, now that both his main plan and backup plan have been ruined.

== Cast ==
- Dolph Lundgren as DEA Agent Evan Maxwell
- Randy Couture as Detective Jack Reiley
- Vinnie Jones as Vincent Camastra
- Gianni Capaldi as Eddie
- Daniel Bonjour as Frank
- Carly Pope as Beverly
- Susie Abromeit as Kathy
- Cinthya Carmona as Ashley
- Domiziano Arcangeli as Madsen
- Holly Lynch as Vicky
- Giorgio Serafini as Sanchez, Taco Truck Guy

== Production ==
=== Filming ===
Capaldi, Lundgren, and Jones acted together in three of Serafini's films back-to-back. Each film also used the same crew. Originally titled Rush, the film was renamed to Hard Rush and finally Ambushed to avoid conflicts with other upcoming films.

== Release ==
=== Theatrical ===
Ambushed was released in the UK on September 28, 2013, and in the US on November 12, 2013.

== Reception ==
=== Critical response ===
Ian Jane of DVD Talk rated it 3/5 stars and called it "a fine pizza and a six pack movie" despite the cliches. David Johnson of DVD Verdict wrote that the film's main characters are too uninteresting and unlikeable.
