= Jaqueline Fleming =

American-Danish actress

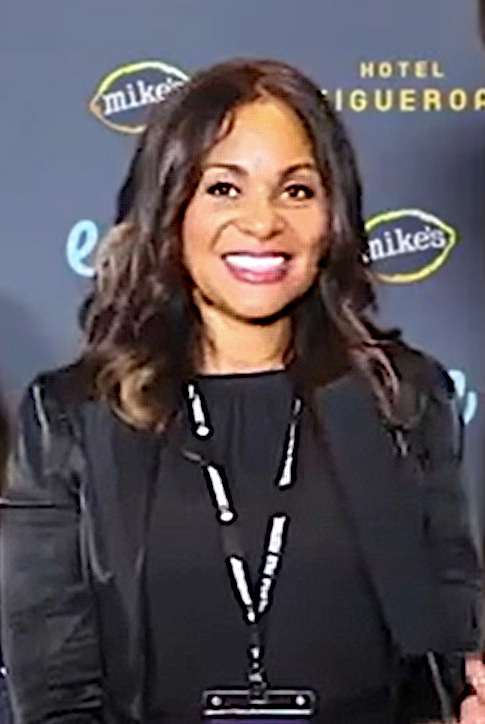
- Fleming at DTLA Film Festival 2018
- Years active: 1993–present

Jaqueline Fleming is an American-Danish actress.

== Career ==
Fleming has appeared in Enemies Among Us, Red, Contraband, Bering Sea Beast, Queen of the South and Abraham Lincoln: Vampire Hunter.

Fleming is also the first acting coach of actor Jason Mitchell.

== Filmography ==
=== Film ===
Year	Title	Role	Notes
1995	Losing Isaiah	File Cabinet Girl	
1995	Scenes for the Soul	Lisa	
1996	Girlfriends	Elaine Hill	
1997	Love Jones	Lisa Martin	
1998	Park Day	Val	
2000	Obstacles	Mia	
2001	All or Nothing	Tiffany	Video
2001	Our Journey	Jessie	Short
2001	Tara	Rachel	Video
2003	Malibooty!	Kelly	Video
2004	Mr. 3000	Young Woman	
2004	Hair Show	Margo	
2004	The Brooke Ellison Story	Night Nurse #2	TV movie
2006	Last Holiday	Tanya	
2006	Just My Luck	Tiffany Richards	
2007	Vegas Vampires	Sister Angela Marie	
2007	Tournament of Dreams	Carolyn	
2007	All About Us	Sheree	
2007	Redrum	Carmen	
2010	Enemies Among Us	Tyra Simmons	
2010	Revenge of the Bridesmaids	Nurse	TV movie
2010	Red	Mama	
2011	The Ledge	Angela Lucetti	
2011	A Little Bit of Heaven	Saleswoman	
2012	Contraband	Jeanie Goldare	
2012	Woman Thou Art Loosed: On the 7th Day	Tia	
2012	Abraham Lincoln: Vampire Hunter	Harriet Tubman	
2013	The Door	The Door	
2013	Bering Sea Beast	Megan Arthur	TV movie
2014	Barefoot	Nurse Margie	
2014	Status: Unknown	Receptionist	TV movie
2014	1 More Chance	Ms. Alexis Whitmore	Short
2015	Sister Switch	Gabby Cole	
2015	Bad Asses on the Bayou	Katie	Video
2015	A Sort of Homecoming	Val	
2015	Nocturna	Receptionist	
2016	The Neighbor	Officer Burns	
2018	The Tale	Margie	
2018	Malicious	Dr. Lee	
2018	River Runs Red	Professor Lawless	
2019	The Opera Game	Malvina	TV movie
2019	Atone	Laura Bishop	
2019	Hell on the Border	Nellie	
2020	TMI	Monica Reid	Short
2020	Good Samaritan	Althea Minnis	
2020	By Design	Gladys Walker	TV movie
2021	Little Vagabond	Pamela	Short
2022	To Her, with Love	Principal Nancy	TV movie
2023	Stronghold	Nena	

=== Television ===
Year	Title	Role	Notes
1997	Good News	Sharon Winston	Episode: "The Fallen Woman"
1997	Sparks	Receptionist (voice)	Episode: "It's Good to Be Negative"
1998	The Steve Harvey Show	Jasmine	Episode: "Papa's Got a Brand New Bag"
1998	In the House	Sylvia	Episode: "All's Fair in Love and War"
1998	Damon	Ally	Episode: "Under Covers"
1998	The Jamie Foxx Show	Jamie's Date	Episode: "Guess Who's Not Coming to Dinner?"
1999	The Wayans Bros.	Fan #1	Episode: "Everybody Loves Shawn"
2000	For Your Love	Sabrina	Episode: "The Date That Time Forgot"
2001	The Andy Dick Show	Woman With Child	Episode: "Man on the Street"
2006	CSI: Miami	Social Worker	Episode: "Collision"
2010	Treme	Angela Nelson	Recurring cast: season 1
2012	New Orleans Pie	Mellinda	Recurring cast
2013-14	Bourbon Whiz	Treasure	Recurring cast
2014	Government Lies	Detective Taylor	Recurring cast
2014	AHA	Claire	Recurring cast
2015	NCIS: New Orleans	FBI Agent Marie Cutter	Episode: "The Insider"
2015	Zoo	Advertising Exec #1	Episode: "That Great Big Hill of Hope"
2016	The Walking Dead	Laundry Woman #1	Episode: "Swear"
2017-18	The Quad	Cynthia Diamond	Recurring cast: season 1, guest: season 2
2019	Queen of the South	Cubes	Episode: "Amores Perros"
2020	Sistas	Officer Juliet Harris	Episode: "Bugaboo" & "Give Me the Night"
