= Shane Coffey =

American actor (active 2004– )

- Born: Houston, Texas, U.S.
- Occupation: Actor
- Years active: 2004–present

Shane Coffey is an American actor. He is best known for his role as Holden Strauss in Freeform's Pretty Little Liars.

== Early life ==
Coffey was born in Houston, Texas and raised in nearby Spring. He studied theater at the University of Southern California. He is a founding member of The Casitas Group, an independent theater company started in 2008, alongside Troian Bellisario.

== Career ==
Coffey's first acting part was playing Patrick for one episode on Summerland alongside Jesse McCartney.

In January 2012, Coffey joined the recurring cast of Pretty Little Liars as Holden Strauss, an old friend of Aria's, who becomes her way of covering when she's actually going to see Ezra Fitz.

Coffey also portrayed Jimmy Nash on The Secret Life of the American Teenager. In 2012, he wrapped on a short film called Exiles, a modern rendition of Shakespeare's Romeo and Juliet with a twist.

Coffey and Troian Bellisario, Pretty Little Liars co-star, make music under the name FAMILY.

In 2013, Coffey appeared in an Audi Super Bowl commercial titled Prom.

In 2015, Coffey starred in Lord Huron's music video "Fool for Love".

Coffey played a leading role in the 2016 film Sugar Mountain, directed by Richard Gray.

== Filmography ==
Film roles
Year	Title	Role	Notes
2011	A Holiday Heist	Student	as Shane Zwiner
2011	Houndz from Hell	Orson	as Shane Zwiner
2012	Joyful Girl	Nic	Short film
2013	The Colony	George Baker	Short film
2013	Exiles	Romeo	Short film
2013	Fire	Boy	Short film
2014	Starry Eyes	Poe	
2015	Surf Noir	Johnny	Short film
2016	Noodles	Ollie	Short film
2016	Sugar Mountain	Liam West	
2016	Things I Like About You		Short film
2016	Others	Silas	Short film
2017	Greenlight	Sam	
2019	Robert the Bruce	Finley	
2018	Hover	Isaiah	

Television roles
Year	Title	Role	Notes
2004	Summerland	Patrick	Episode: "Kicking and Screaming"
2010	The Secret Life of the American Teenager	Jimmy Nash	Recurring role; 4 episodes
2010	The Whole Truth	Zach Sellards	Episode: "Pilot"
2012-2017	Pretty Little Liars	Holden Strauss	Recurring role; 9 episodes
2012	I Just Want My Pants Back	Ethan	Episode: "Yoko"
2012	CSI: Crime Scene Investigation	Pete Moyer	Episode: "Trends with Benefits"
2012	Last Man Standing	Terrence	Episode: "Animal Wrongs"
2012-2015	Perception	D.J. Pierce	Recurring role; 5 episodes
2013	Castle	Sean Tanner	Episode: "The Human Factor"
2013	The Originals	Timothy "Tim"	2 episodes
2013	Grimm	Derrick Bryce	Episode: "Twelve Days of Krampus" (Part 2)
2014	The Novice	Kyle	Television film
2014	NCIS: Los Angeles	Richard Mills	1 episode
2015	Major Crimes	Jaime	1 episode
2017	Lethal Weapon	Reuben Tomar	1 episode
2017	S.W.A.T	Kevin Lynch	1 episode:Radical
2018	Criminal Minds	Emmanuel Rask	1 episode
2020	Good Girls	Kevin	3 episode
