= Drew Roy =

American actor

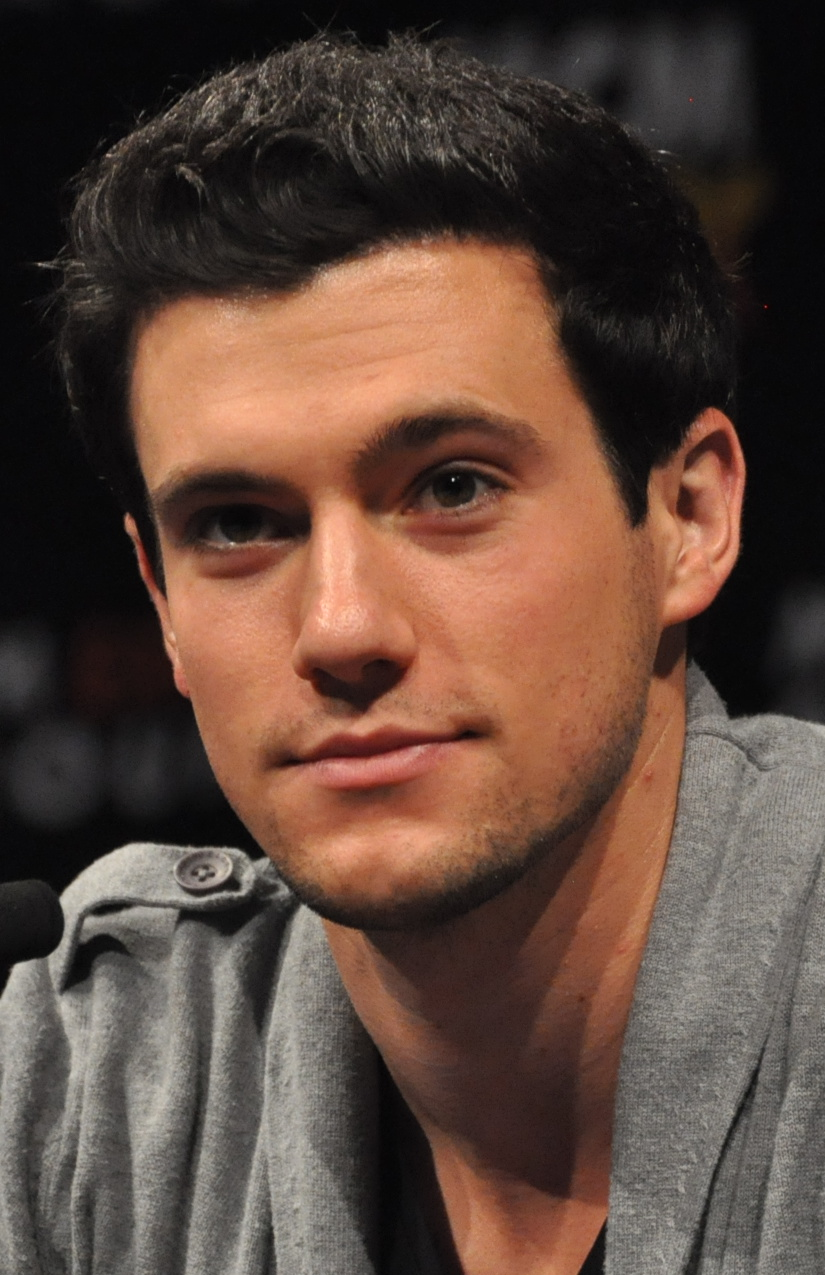
- Roy in 2013
- Born: Andrew Roy; May 16, 1986 (age 40); Clanton, Alabama, U.S.
- Occupation: Actor
- Years active: 2006–present
- Known for: Falling Skies
- Spouse: Renee Gardner (m. 2015)
- Children: 2

Andrew "Drew" Roy (born May 16, 1986) is an American actor. Born and raised in Clanton, Alabama, he moved to Los Angeles to pursue an acting career. He is best known for his role as Hal in Falling Skies and Jesse in Hannah Montana.

== Career ==
Roy started his acting career with roles in movies such as Curse of Pirate Death and Blink. He made his TV debut on Greek playing the role of omega chi pledge. In 2009, he played Griffin in the television series iCarly. He guest starred in episodes of Hannah Montana as Jesse, Miley's (Miley Cyrus) love interest, and on Lincoln Heights. He had roles in the short films Tag, Running Up That Hill, and Dissonance.

In 2010, he portrayed Seth Hancock, son of Arthur "Bull" Hancock, a thoroughbred horse farm owner in the film Secretariat.

In 2011, he landed the lead role of Hal Mason on Falling Skies. He starred as Miles West in the thriller film Sugar Mountain. In 2017, he guest-starred as Joel in the TV show Timeless. He also recurred in the TNT post-apocalyptic drama The Last Ship. He had a minor role as Carter in the Lifetime movie Blood, Sweat, and Lies. In 2019, he played a supporting role in the film The Murder of Nicole Brown Simpson.

== Filmography ==
Film

Year	Title	Role	Note
2006	Curse of Pirate Death	Boyfriend	
2007	Blink		
2009	Tag	Josh	Short film
2010	One Wish		
2010	Costa Rican Summer	Doobie	
2010	Secretariat	Seth Hancock	
2013	Running Up That Hill	Chad	Short film
2014	Dissonance	Matt	Short film
2016	Sugar Mountain	Miles West	
2019	The Murder of Nicole Brown Simpson	Ron Goldman	

Television

Year	Title	Role	Episodes
2009	Lincoln Heights	Travis Benjamin	3 episodes
2009–2010	iCarly	Griffin	2 episodes
2009–2011	Hannah Montana	Jesse	5 episodes
2011–2015	Falling Skies	Hal Mason	Main role; 52 episodes (season 1-5)
2017	Timeless	Joel	Episode: "Karma Chameleon"
2017	The Last Ship	Christos Vellek	3 episodes
2017	When the Streetlights Go On	Mr. Carpenter	Unsold pilot
2018	Blood, Sweat, and Lies	Carter	TV movie (Lifetime)
2021	iCarly	Griffin	Guest star
