= Robert the Bruce (film) =

2019 war film by Richard Gray

- Theatrical release poster
- Directed by: Richard Gray
- Written by: Eric Belgau; Angus Macfadyen
- Produced by: Angus Macfadyen
- Starring: Angus Macfadyen; Jared Harris; Anna Hutchison; Patrick Fugit
- Cinematography: John Garrett
- Edited by: Hayley Miro Browne
- Music by: Mel Elias
- Production company: Yellow Brick Films
- Distributed by: Signature Entertainment; Metro International
- Release dates: 23 June 2019 (Edinburgh); 28 June 2019 (United Kingdom); 24 April 2020 (United States)
- Running time: 124 minutes
- Country: United Kingdom
- Language: English
- Box office: $23,434

Robert the Bruce is a 2019 British epic historical fiction war film directed by Richard Gray concerning the renowned king of the same name. It is a sequel to Mel Gibson's Braveheart (1995), with Angus Macfadyen reprising his role as Robert the Bruce. A character-driven ensemble piece, it portrays Robert's relationship with a peasant family as a galvanising influence on his struggle for independence and his ensuing reign.

== Plot ==
In 1306, some time after the execution of William Wallace on 23 Aug 1305, a truce meeting takes place between Robert the Bruce and John Comyn in a chapel. Comyn offers to abandon his claim to the Scottish throne and support Robert in exchange for land and money. Robert confronts Comyn, aware of his plan to betray him to the English at the meeting site, and kills him in a duel. Chaos ensues as the guards outside engage in a fight, led by Robert's loyal vassal, James Douglas.

In the winter of 1313, Robert, with only a handful of men remaining, camps in the woods. Douglas shares with Hamish, a young boy, the belief that Robert will never give up and will lead them to victory. Robert interrupts, declaring that his war is over and instructs them to return home. Three disillusioned soldiers decide to capture Robert and claim the bounty instead. While contemplating killing Robertn older soldier argues that it would be a mortal sin and releases himRob. ert leaves, f for homeollowed by Hamish and Douglas.

In a mountain cottage, Morag Macfie tells her son Scot, niece Iver and nephew Carney the story of how Robert killed Comyn. Scot, bearing resentment because his father died fighting for Robert, dislikes him. Scot notices Robert passing through the woods but doesn't approach him. Later, Scot and Morag visit his father's grave and Scot informs his mother of the sighting but she dismisses it.

The three soldiers catch up to Robert and attack him, resulting in him killing two of them but being gravely wounded by Will. Robert manages to escape and finds refuge in a cave. While in the cave, Robert witnesses a spider trying to build a web, succeeding with one more try than Robert's attempts to free Scotland (according to legend). Will, seeking the reward, leads a group of soldiers, including the local Sheriff Brandubh, to the site. Will is killed by Brandubh, who conceals the truth and begins a search for Robert, feigning friendship. Brandubh delivers Robert's sword to Carney for repairs. Carney takes it to his master, Sean, a blacksmith, where he briefly interacts with Sean's daughter, Briana. Scot, Iver and Carney stumble upon the injured Robert while hunting. They bring him back to Morag's house, despite their clan's allegiance to the English.

Over the winter, Robert recovers and becomes a part of Morag's family. He apologizes to Scot for his father's death, teaches Carney swordsmanship and grows close to Morag. Robert decides to continue fighting, determined not to let the sacrifices made by families like theirs be in vain. One night, a man loyal to Brandubh sees Robert in Morag's house and reports it. Brandubh gathers his men to attack but Briana overhears and warns Morag's family. They prepare to fight when Brandubh arrives. Iver and Scot take positions in the trees with bows, Carney conceals a sword and Briana hides in the barn.

Brandubh strikes Morag, and Robert confronts him, claiming protection over Morag's family as the King of Scotland. A battle ensues and with the assistance of Scot, Iver and Briana, Robert and Carney fight off Brandubh's men. Carney mourns over Briana's death but they emerge victorious. Morag saves Robert's life by killing Brandubh. After burying Briana, Robert leads the family to the fortress of Angus MacDonald, where they are welcomed. Years later, Morag visits Scot's grave, as he died fighting for Robert at the Battle of Bannockburn in 1314, which ultimately led to Scotland's freedom.

== Cast ==
- Angus Macfadyen as Robert the Bruce
- Anna Hutchison as Morag Macfie
- Zach McGowan as Brandubh
- Gabriel Bateman as Scot Macfie
- Talitha Bateman as Iver Macfie
- Brandon Lessard as Carney Macfie
- Diarmaid Murtagh as James Douglas
- Emma Kenney as Briana
- Patrick Fugit as Will
- Melora Walters as Ylfa
- Shane Coffey as Finley
- Daniel Portman as Angus McDonald
- Seoras Wallace as Donald
- Kevin McNally as Seán
- Jared Harris as John Comyn
- Nick Farnell as Thomas
- Gianni Capaldi as David MacDonald
- Mhairi Calvey as Elizabeth de Burgh
- Will Carlson as Michael
- Stephen Murphy as Black Comyn
- Judah Nelson as Hamish
- Anthony Sharpe as Jacobus Crier

== Production ==
The film was announced in February 2018, with Angus Macfadyen reprising his role from Braveheart (1995). Jared Harris, Anna Hutchison and Patrick Fugit were also cast amongst others.

The film continues directly on from Braveheart and follows the widow Moira, portrayed by Anna Hutchison, and her family (portrayed by Gabriel Bateman and Talitha Bateman), who save Robert the Bruce, with Angus Macfadyen reprising his role from Braveheart.

The cast includes Jared Harris, Patrick Fugit, Zach McGowan, Emma Kenney, Diarmaid Murtagh, Seoras Wallace, Shane Coffey, Kevin McNally, and Melora Walters. Richard Gray directed the film, with Macfadyen and Eric Belgau writing the script. Helmer Gray, Macfadyen, Hutchison, Kim Barnard, Nick Farnell, Cameron Nuggent, and Andrew Curry produced the film.

Filming took place in 2019 and was completed with a limited cinematic release the same year. Filming had begun by February 2019. In order to film the harsh winters which existed in Scotland during these times, the crew used the snow-covered hills lining the Yellowstone River (Paradise) Valley, south of Livingston, Montana, for those needed shots.

== Release ==
The world premiere of Robert the Bruce took place at the Edinburgh Film Festival on 23 June 2019. It was released in the United Kingdom on 28 June 2019. Signature Entertainment released the official theatrical trailer for the UK on 7 June 2019.

The film was scheduled to be released in the United States with a premiere screening by Fathom Events for one-night-only on 16 April 2020 with a limited theatrical release on 24 April 2020 by Screen Media Films, to coincide with the 700th anniversary of the Declaration of Arbroath. However, due to the COVID-19 pandemic, Fathom Events cancelled the premiere and limited release. Braveheart was also scheduled for a theatrical re-release by Fathom Events in March 2020 for its 25th anniversary and in promotion for Robert the Bruce, but it was also cancelled.

=== Home media ===
Signature Entertainment released the film in the United Kingdom, on DVD and Blu-ray disc, on 4 November 2019. The sole extra feature is an audio commentary with director Richard Gray and co-writer and star Angus Macfadyen. Screen Media Films released the film in the United States on DVD only on 2 June 2020.

== Reception ==
=== Box office ===
Robert the Bruce grossed £19,026 in the United Kingdom on its opening weekend (28/06/19) and £98,691 for its UK theatrical run. $TBD in other territories, for a total worldwide gross of £98,691.

=== Critical response ===
On review aggregator Rotten Tomatoes, the film holds an approval rating of 44% based on 52 reviews, with an average rating of 5/10. The website's critics consensus reads: "It's inspired by epic real-life events, but rich cinematography and the best of intentions aren't enough to carry Robert the Bruce past its leaden pace and bland storytelling." Metacritic, which uses a weighted average, assigned the film a score of 42 out of 100, based on 11 critics, indicating "mixed or average" reviews.

=== Accolades ===
At the 2019 Edinburgh Film Festival, the film was nominated for the Audience Award.

== See also ==
- Outlaw King (2018) stars Chris Pine as Robert the Bruce, but depicts different events.
