= Bering Sea Beast =

- Written by: Brook Durham
- Directed by: Don E. Fauntleroy
- Original language: English

Production
- Running time: 86 min

Original release
- Release: 2013

Bering Sea Beast (also known as Beast of the Bering Sea) is a 2013 horror television film directed by Don E. Fauntleroy and written by Brook Durham.

A sea salvage operation in the Bering Sea disturbs a species of monstrous underwater creatures known as sea vampires.

== Premise ==
After their father is killed by a vampiric sea creature, Bering Sea dredgers Joe and Donna, along with their new deckhand, team up with a marine biologist to render the species extinct and fend off takeover attempts from a rival salvage team.

== Cast ==
- Cassie Scerbo as Donna Hunter
- Brandon Beemer as Owen Powers
- Jaqueline Fleming as Megan Arthur
- Jonathan Lipnicki as Joe
- Kevin Dobson as Glenn Hunter
- Garin Sparks as Dump Truck Driver
- Jimmy Sweetwater as Jimmy
- Lawrence Turner as Thorne
- Michael Papajohn as Jonas
- Dane Rhoades as Jeb
- Isaiah Laborde as Frank
- Tim J. Smith as Frik
- George Brooks as Dredge Captain
