= Andre Gordon =

American actor, producer, writer, director

- Born: Saint Andrew, Jamaica
- Occupations: Actor and film producer
- Years active: Since 2005

Andre Gordon is an American film and television actor as well as a producer, writer and director.

== Early life and education ==
Andre was born in Saint Andrew, Jamaica and grew up in Miami, Florida. He is an alumnus of the BFA program at Florida State University.

== Career ==
Since 2005, Gordon had appeared in at least 30 films and at least 19 television productions. He has also served as a producer or assistant producer for at least 29 films Andre has worked theatrically in both film and television, which includes guest appearances on: Modern Family, Haunted Hathaways, Raising Hope, MAD TV, Campus Ladies, Scrubs, Phineas and Ferb and Zoey 101 along with the features, Like Mike, and SWAT. He is also a producer and lead actor in Sony's film franchise Cross starring Michael Clarke Duncan, Brian Austin Greene, Vinnie Jones, Danny Trejo, and Michael Madsen.

Andre has directed Morgan Freeman, Ed Begley Jr., and Kathryn Joosten in "Wish Wizard," James Caan in "Acre Beyond the Rye", Armand Assante in "You Can't Have It," C Thomas Howell in "Wedding Day," and more.

In 2015 Andre Gordon and the cast of The Jungle Bunch won the International Emmy Award for best Kids Animation Show.

In 2018 Gordon and the cast of Miraculous Lady Bug won the Teen Choice Award for Choice Animated TV Series.

Currently, Gordon is directing and producing a documentary "When I Grow Up" set for release in December 2020.

Andre is also President and C.E.O of 4Horsemen Films.

== Filmography ==
List of film work
Title	Year	Genre	Role	Notes
Mrs. Pilgrim Goes to Hollywood	2002	comedy	Intercourz	
Like Mike	2002	family, fantasy	Rick the Camera Guy	
Daredevil	2003	comic book film	Body Guard	
S.W.A.T.	2003	adventure	Officer Harris	
Gotta Make Them Angels	2004	horror, short	Joe	
Cordially Invited	2007	family, romance	Kareem Jackson	
The Chronicles of Curtis Tucker: Letting Go	2008	family	Curtis Tucker	
The Chronicles of Curtis Tucker: Fly For Me Now	2008	drama, family	Curtis Tucker	
The Chronicles of Curtis Tucker: There Was a Girl	2008	family	Curtis Tucker	
Black Inside: The Remington Wallace Burnett Story	2008	comedy	Remington Wallace Burnett	
Willie Mays and the Emptiness	2008	drama, fantasy	Willie Mays	
N Word	2008	action, drama, short	Ricky Moroney	
Natalee Holloway	2009	drama, mystery	(Voice)	
Precinct 33	2009	crime, short	Isaiah	
In the City	2009	romance	Harp	
Ashland	2009	drama	Micheal Ashland	
The Wronged Man	2010	drama	Additional voices	
Cross	2011	action, fantasy	Ranger	
Wedding Day'	2012	drama, thriller	Will Donovan	
Let's Eat Lolly	2012	short, adventure, comedy	Alien Trucker (Leuai)	
Wish Wizard	2014	family, fantasy	Curly	
"The Jungle Bunch 2: The Great Treasure Quest"	2014	adventure, family	Gilbert	
"A Perfect Christmas List"	2014	drama, family	Ed (as Andre Gordon)	
"Kidnapped: The Hannah Anderson Story"	2015	drama, thriller	Chuck	
"Cross Wars"	2017	fantasy, action	Ranger	
"In Vino"	2017	thriller	Larry Wiener	
"Cross 3"	2019	fantasy, action	Ranger	
"Cross 5"	pre-production	fantasy, action	Ranger	
"Cross 4"	pre-production	fantasy, action	Ranger	

Television work
Title	Year	Genre	Role	Notes
Color of War	2001	war film	Naval officer, battalion soldier#1,2	
Spin City	2002	comedy	Security Guard	
Scrubs	2002	drama, comedy	Dream Zombie	
MADtv	2002	comedy, variety	Bill Cosby	
Campus Ladies	2006	comedy	Bones	
Celebrity Deathmatch	2006	animation, claymation	Xzibit	
Zoey 101	2007	drama, family	Referee #2	
Banja	2007	animation	Banja	
The Boondocks	2010	animation, comedy	Flonominal	
Secret Millionaires Club	2011	animation	Principal	
Phineas and Ferb	2011	animation	Additional Voices	
NCIS: Los Angeles	2012	drama	Security Officer	
Switched at Birth	2012	family, drama	Victor	
The Haunted Hathaways	2013	family, fantasy	Mr. Lauter	
Raising Hope	2013	family, comedy	Wayne Hill	
Modern Family	2015	drama, comedy	Dad	
PINY Institute of New York	2017	animation, comedy	CJ Blue (English) / Tri-Hop (English)	
Ninjak vs the Valiant Universe	2018	adventure, drama	Neville's Assistant	
Miraculous: Tales of Ladybug & Cat Noir	2015-2023	animation	Additional Voices / Alec / Alec Cataldi	

Producer credits
Title	Year	Genre	Attribution
Hell Comes to Montana	2007	Western	associate producer
The Chronicles of Curtis Tucker: Letting Go	2008	family	producer
The Chronicles of Curtis Tucker: Fly for Me Now	2008	family	producer
The Chronicles of Curtis Tucker: There Was a Girl	2008	family	producer
Black Inside: The Remington Wallace Burnett Story	2008	comedy	Producer
N Word	2008	short	Producer
Late Night Burrito Place	2008	short, adventure, comedy	Supervising Producer
An American Standard	2008	short, comedy, drama	Producer
Going Pro	2008	reality-television	Producer
Wish	2009	short, drama	Producer
It's a Long Ride Home	2009	short, drama, romance	Supervising Producer
In the City	2009	romance	Producer
Ashland	2009	drama	Producer
Cross	2011	action, fantasy	Executive Producer
The Willow	2012	reality-TV	Producer - 1 episode
Wedding Day	2012	thriller	Producer
Wish Wizard	2014	short, family, fantasy	Producer
Only God Can	2015	family	Producer
Cross Wars	2007	action	Executive Producer
In Vino	2017	thriller	Associate Producer
March	2018	drama	Producer
Cross 3	2019	action	Executive Producer
When I Grow Up?	2020 (filming)	documentary	Producer
Cross 5	pre-production	action	Executive Producer
Cross 4	pre-production	action	Executive Producer
Christmas Express	pre-production	drama	Producer
The Untraceables	pre-production (announced)	action	Producer

Writer Credits
Title	Year	Genre	Attribution
The Chronicles of Curtis Tucker: Letting Go	2008	family	co-creator
The Chronicles of Curtis Tucker: Fly for Me Now	2008	family	co-creator
The Chronicles of Curtis Tucker: There Was a Girl	2008	family	co-creator
Black Inside: The Remington Wallace Burnett Story	2008	short, comedy	Written by
N Word	2008	short, comedy, drama	Written by
Late Night Burrito Place	2013	short, adventure, comedy	Additional Dialogue
Going Pro	2008	reality-TV	Segment "writer"
Karma Bitch	2009	short, comedy	Written by
Ashland	2009	drama	Written by
Wedding Day	2012/II	thriller	Written by
Wish Wizard	2014	short, family, fantasy	co-writer/written by
When I Grow Up?	2020	documentary	Written by
Christmas Express	production	family	Written by
Acre Beyond the Rye	pre-production	family	Written by

Director credits
Title	Year	Genre	Attribution
Karma Bitch	2009	short	Director
In the City	2009	romance	Director
Wedding Day	2012/II	thriller	Director
Wish Wizard	2014	short, fantasy	Director
You Can't Have It	2017	thriller	Director
When I Grow Up?	2020 - filming	Documentary	Director
Christmas Express	production	family	Director
Acres Beyond the Rye	prre-production	family	Director
