= Contraband (2012 film) =

2012 film by Baltasar Kormákur

- Theatrical release poster
- Directed by: Baltasar Kormákur
- Screenplay by: Aaron Guzikowski
- Based on: Reykjavík-Rotterdam by: Arnaldur Indriðason; Óskar Jónasson
- Produced by: Tim Bevan; Eric Fellner; Baltasar Kormákur; Stephen Levinson; Mark Wahlberg
- Starring: Mark Wahlberg; Kate Beckinsale; Ben Foster; Giovanni Ribisi; Caleb Landry Jones; J. K. Simmons
- Cinematography: Barry Ackroyd
- Edited by: Elísabet Ronaldsdóttir
- Music by: Clinton Shorter
- Production companies: Relativity Media; Working Title Films; Blueeyes Productions; Leverage Entertainment; Closest to the Hole Productions
- Distributed by: Universal Pictures
- Release date: January 13, 2012 (United States)
- Running time: 109 minutes
- Countries: United States; United Kingdom
- Languages: English; Spanish
- Budget: $25 million
- Box office: $96.3 million

Contraband is a 2012 action thriller film directed by Baltasar Kormákur, and starring Mark Wahlberg, Kate Beckinsale, Ben Foster, Caleb Landry Jones, Giovanni Ribisi, Lukas Haas, Diego Luna and J. K. Simmons and follows a former smuggler who is coerced to smuggle illicit goods from Panama into the United States. The film is a remake of the 2008 Icelandic film Reykjavík-Rotterdam distributed by Universal Pictures.

== Plot ==
In New Orleans, Chris Farraday, a reformed smuggler, enjoys a quiet family life with his wife, Kate, and their two children. Their tranquility is shattered when they discover Kate's brother, Andy, has become entangled in drug smuggling. To make matters worse, Andy panicked during a U.S. Customs and Border Protection inspection and dumped his illicit cargo into the Mississippi River.

Andy's boss, Tim Briggs threatens to kill Chris's family if Andy does not reimburse him for the drugs. Chris plans to smuggle $10 million in fake bills from Panama into the U.S. in a van. He asks former partner Sebastian Abney, who owns a construction business, to fund the scheme before joining the crew of a cargo ship with Andy and partners Danny and Davis. After Briggs breaks into Chris's house and intimidates Kate and their children, they move into Sebastian's house for safety.

In Panama, Chris creates a diversion on the ship so he, Andy, and Danny can leave and retrieve the fake bills. Chris and Danny eventually go to meet an unstable crime lord named Gonzalo for the fakes, leaving Andy in the van with their money. Briggs calls Andy, threatening to kill one of Chris's sons if Andy doesn't go to another address to buy cocaine with the money. With Andy and the money gone, Chris agrees to help Gonzalo rob an armored car in exchange for the fake bills. Gonzalo and his men are killed during the heist, but Chris and Danny escape with the van, the fake bills, and the Jackson Pollock painting Gonzalo was trying to steal, loading it all onto the cargo ship.

Meanwhile, it's revealed that Sebastian is in debt to gangster Jim Church and was secretly working with Briggs. Sebastian hears that Chris plans to dump the cocaine and tells Briggs to threaten Kate in order to stop Chris from doing so. Rattled, Kate leaves Sebastian's with the kids but when she goes back to retrieve some personal items, he drunkenly confronts her and accidentally knocks her out against a bathtub.

Sebastian contacts the ship's captain, Camp, and tells him of the cocaine, promising him a share if he secures it. Camp calls Customs to inspect the ship in New Orleans. The Customs agents find the spot where Chris' team hid the bills, but it's empty. They detain Chris and search the van, but thinking the painting is just a tarp, ignore it and let Chris go.

Chris and Andy are captured by Briggs, who demands the cocaine. Chris takes Briggs to Camp's house, having made a duplicate key while on the ship, and activates the security system. After giving Briggs and his gang the cocaine, Chris sneaks out. Camp awakens to the noise and encounters the gang as the police arrive; they're all arrested for cocaine possession.

Having figured out Sebastian was working with Briggs, Chris drives to Sebastian's house, then his job site, looking for Kate. Sebastian, thinking her dead, had dumped Kate's body in a foundation at the site. Chris beats him up for his betrayal before locating and saving Kate. Sebastian is arrested and sent to prison, where he is greeted by a gang led by Chris Farraday's incarcerated father.

Danny and Davis retrieve the fake bills which Chris had dumped into the Mississippi River reaching New Orleans. At a U.S. Customs auction, Andy buys the van for $750 and finds the painting still in it while Chris sells the bills to Church for $3 million. Church asks about the missing painting and tells Chris it can be fenced for over $20 million on the black market. With the money, Chris, Kate, and their children begin a new life in a waterfront house.

== Cast ==
- Mark Wahlberg as Chris Farraday
- Kate Beckinsale as Kate Farraday
- Ben Foster as Sebastian Abney
- Caleb Landry Jones as Andy
- Giovanni Ribisi as Tim Briggs
- Diego Luna as Gonzalo
- J. K. Simmons as Captain Redmond Camp
- Lukas Haas as Danny Raymer
- Michael Beasley as Davis
- Robert Wahlberg as John Bryce
- Jaqueline Fleming as Jeanie Goldare
- William Lucking as Bud Farraday
- David O'Hara as Jim Church
- Kirk Bovill as Crewman
- Lucky Johnson as Tarik
- Viktor Hernandez as Edwin
- Ólafur Darri Ólafsson as Olaf
- Jason Mitchell as Walter

== Production ==
Filming took place in early 2011 in New Orleans, Louisiana and Panama City.

== Release ==
The film was released on 13 January 2012 in the United States.

=== Critical reception ===
On Rotten Tomatoes the film holds an approval rating of 50% based on 163 reviews, with an average score of 5.4/10. The site's critics consensus states: "It's more entertaining than your average January action thriller, but that isn't enough to excuse Contraband's lack of originality and unnecessarily convoluted plot." Metacritic assigned the film a weighted average score of 51 out of 100 based on 38 critics, indicating "mixed or average" reviews. Audiences surveyed by CinemaScore gave the film an average grade "A−" on an A+ to F scale.

Roger Ebert of the Chicago Sun-Times gave the film two out of four, and felt that "Contraband involves a lot of energy," but he was growing "tired of violent retreads of these heist elements." Tom Long of The Detroit News criticized the film for having "too much plot and too little character" and concluded that it "comes off the factory floor with its engine running and ready to drive. But the ride feels overly familiar." Claudia Puig of USA Today called "the 'one last job' trope ... a particularly tired one" and remarked that while it "has a few moments of tension," the film "adheres to a predictable heist formula hardly worth trafficking in." Andrew O'Hehir of Salon characterized the film as "exactly the sort of movie that Hollywood specializes in, the kind which seems on paper as if it ought to be entertaining, but winds up a massive and chaotic drag" and observed that "it's much more like a cynical hash job, whose faux-realistic manner can't hide all the hackneyed crime-movie situations."

Peter Travers of Rolling Stone thought the film "goes down in a sea of Hollywood clichés" and that Mark "Wahlberg could sleepwalk through this role, and does. See this movie and you'll surely follow his lead." Scott Tobias of NPR dismissed the film as a "mediocre [...] thriller," something "to be remembered, vaguely". Rafer Guzman of Newsday expressed disappointment that "a little action is all you'll get" and opined that the film "fails by overreaching: It aspires to the heightened drama of The Departed but lands instead in the bargain bin of forgettable action product."

Justin Chang of Variety praised the film as "reasonably swift and effective" and for taking "a hard-driving line of action and a commitment to one-damned-thing-after-another storytelling", while suffering from "preposterous detours". Michael O'Sullivan of The Washington Post compared the film to "an Ocean's Eleven movie, minus the glamour". Owen Gleiberman of Entertainment Weekly stated that the film, "while often grungy and far-fetched, does keep you watching", which is sufficient for a film released in January.

=== Home media ===
Contraband was released to DVD and Blu-ray on April 24, 2012.

The Blu-ray was reissued in 2015 and 2019. In 2021, Mill Creek Entertainment released a Blu-ray double feature featuring Contraband and fellow Universal film Fear in which Mark Wahlberg also starred.
