= The Unholy Trinity =

2024 film by Richard Gray

- Theatrical release poster
- Directed by: Richard Gray
- Written by: Lee Zachariah
- Produced by: Carter Boehm; Richard Gray; Colin Floom; Michele Gray; Kellie Brooks; Jeanne Allgood
- Starring: Pierce Brosnan; Samuel L. Jackson; Brandon Lessard; Veronica Ferres; Gianni Capaldi; Q'orianka Kilcher; Tim Daly; Ethan Peck; Katrina Bowden; David Arquette
- Cinematography: Thomas Scott Stanton
- Edited by: Lee Smith
- Music by: Marco Beltrami; Tristan Beltrami
- Production companies: AmadeuStudios; Jaggi Entertainment; High Five Films
- Distributed by: Roadside Attractions; Saban Films
- Release dates: October 12, 2024 (Zurich); June 13, 2025 (United States)
- Running time: 93 minutes
- Country: United States
- Language: English
- Box office: $1 million

The Unholy Trinity is a 2024 American Western action film written by Lee Zachariah, directed by Richard Gray, and starring Pierce Brosnan, Samuel L. Jackson, and Brandon Lessard, and follows a young man who travels to the titular town of Montana to avenge his father's death. It received mixed reviews from critics.

== Plot ==
In the grounds of a Montana prison, Henry Broadway witnesses his father, Isaac, being hanged. Isaac vehemently claims innocence, insisting he was framed by Saul Butler, the corrupt sheriff of Trinity, a frontier town. Henry, a gullible son estranged from his father, readily believes him and sets out to fulfill Isaac's dying wish to clear his name and deliver justice.

Upon arriving in Trinity, Henry confronts the current sheriff, Gabriel Dove, who gently informs Henry that Saul Butler is already dead. He tries to explain that the town viewed Isaac as a villain and Saul as a hero, warning Henry that challenging Butler's legacy would only cause trouble. The townsfolk believe that Butler was killed by a Blackfoot woman, Running Cub, and one of them, Gideon, demands Gabriel investigate rumors of her location. Gabriel finds her, but believing her to be innocent, advises her to move on.

Gabriel pays for Henry to stay at the local saloon. That evening, a dispute over a local prostitute, Julia, turns violent. A local miner, Asa, shoots Julia and Henry shoots him in turn. One of Asa's brothers, Red, pursues Henry, but is killed by St Christopher, a priest and ex-slave. He reveals that he was once Isaac's partner in the later stages of the Civil War, in which Isaac had stolen a significant amount of gold from the South, then double-crossed Christopher, who is still seeking his promised share. He believes that Isaac hid his share under his family home. St Christopher had hired Jacob, a "stage actor", to extract a confession from Isaac at his hanging. Jacob, however, has brought additional gunmen to the meeting place, and holds Henry hostage. Gabriel follows Henry as demanded by Gideon and Asa's brothers, and is attacked by Jacob and his men. With help from St Christopher and Running Cub, Gabriel and Henry kill Jacob and his men.

Gabriel confirms that the hunt for the gold is resurfacing, informing Henry that his own house was once Isaac's and has been unsuccessfully searched for the treasure before. Gideon and a posse set out in search of Running Cub, and Gabriel goes to warn her. In Gabriel's absence, Christopher visits his house in search of the treasure and has a tense discussion with his wife Sarah, before Henry intervenes and tells him the treasure is missing. Gabriel's posse confronts Running Cub, but Gabriel arrives and tells them that, in fact, he killed Butler to save a child. In the ensuing shootout, most of the posse is killed, including Gideon's son, and Running Cub is shot and injured. Gabriel and Running Cub flee to his house on horseback, where Running Cub tells Henry she knew him as a boy and taught him to ride. Gideon and Christopher rally the townsfolk to attack Gabriel's house, seeking revenge and the gold.

Gabriel advises Sarah to flee with Julia's orphaned daughter, Mabel, but she opts to stay and fight, as does Henry. In the fight for the Dove house, Asa's brothers capture and torture Henry, but he is set free by their sister, who has had enough of their abuse. Gideon is killed, as are most of the attackers. Christopher, who has stayed behind, kills the barman after a chance comment leads him to believe the gold is buried under the town church, and then kills the town preacher before digging for the gold. Henry and Gabriel confront him there. Henry offers Christopher the chance to take his share of the gold and leave, but Christopher declines, and shoots Henry and Gabriel, wounding them, but is shot dead by Gabriel.

In the end, Henry, Gabriel, and Running Cub recover from their wounds, and a softened Henry disperses his father's ashes. Ready to leave Trinity, he acknowledges his rightful inheritance of Isaac's house, but chooses to let Gabriel keep it, recognizing the life Gabriel has built there with his family. Gabriel, however, insists that Henry stay and gives him a sheriff's deputy badge.

== Cast ==
- Pierce Brosnan as Gabriel Dove
- Samuel L. Jackson as St. Christopher
- Brandon Lessard as Henry
- Ethan Peck as Sam Scarborough
- Q'orianka Kilcher as Running Cub
- Tim Daly as Isaac Broadway
- Veronica Ferres as Sarah
- David Arquette as Father Jacob
- Gianni Capaldi as Gideon
- Katrina Bowden as Julia

== Production ==
In October 2023, filming was announced to have occurred in Montana. Since filming began during the 2023 SAG-AFTRA strike, SAG-AFTRA granted the filmmakers an interim agreement to allow filming. Filming was done at the Old Montana Territorial abd State Prison in Deer Lodge, Montana, and the town of Trinity was filmed at the Yellowstone Film Ranch in Livingston, Montana.

== Release ==
The film had its world premiere on October 12, 2024, at the Zurich Film Festival.

In May 2025, Saban Films acquired North American rights to the film, in partnership with Roadside Attractions, and set it for a June 13, 2025, release.

== Reception ==
On the review aggregator website Rotten Tomatoes, 42% of 36 critics' reviews are positive, with an average rating of 5.2/10. The website's consensus reads: "The Unholy Trinity wrangles some committed performances from its seasoned cast for intermittent entertainment, but ultimately feels weighed down by uninspired storytelling and lackluster action." Metacritic, which uses a weighted average, assigned the film a score of 48 out of 100, based on 9 critics, indicating "mixed or average" reviews.

Jordan Mintzer of The Hollywood Reporter wrote: "At best, this serviceable shoot-'em-up features solid turns by veterans Pierce Brosnan and Samuel L. Jackson — the latter sporting a formidable pair of graying mutton chops. But the seasoned duo can only do so much to salvage a convoluted and formulaic scenario involving bloody vendettas, double crossings, stolen gold bars and lots of boilerplate dialogue, all of it set against a rather stunning Montana backdrop."

Glenn Kenny of RogerEbert.com gave the film two and a half out of four stars, writing: "The movie's not a barn-burner or future classic, but new Westerns are thin on the ground these days, and this ultimately is a better-than-decent one."
