= Gianni Capaldi =

Scottish actor

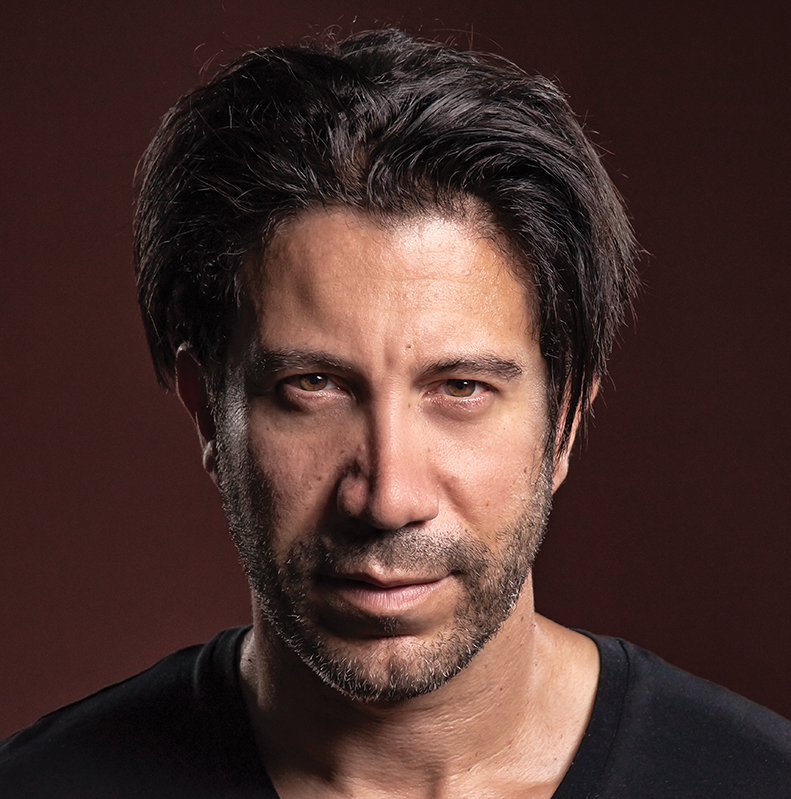
- Capaldi in 2015
- Born: Hamilton, Scotland
- Education: Glasgow Caledonian University
- Occupations: Actor, film producer
- Years active: 2005–present
- Partner: Amanda Fitz
- Relatives: Jimmy Logan, Lewis Capaldi, Peter Capaldi

Gianni Capaldi is a Scottish actor and film and television producer.

== Personal life and education ==
Capaldi was born in Hamilton, South Lanarkshire to parents Tony and Maria. He attended St Mary's Primary School and Hamilton College before continuing his education at Glasgow Caledonian University. He played youth football for Motherwell.

Capaldi is related to Scottish entertainers Jimmy Logan, Lewis Capaldi and Peter Capaldi.

Capaldi lives in Los Angeles, California. He is married to former NFL San Diego Chargers cheerleader Amanda Fitz.

== Controversy ==
On 18 April 2022, TV presenter Jean Johansson accused Capaldi of using "abusive" language during a private message exchange with her on the social media platform Twitter. In June 2022, a video emerged of Capaldi singing in support of the New IRA paramilitary organisation at a Celtic convention in Las Vegas.

== Career ==
Capaldi has starred in various genres, from drama to horror, he is mostly known in the action world appearing in films such as Blood of Redemption (2013), Puncture Wounds (2014), and Nightworld (2017).

Capaldi's first major role, portraying a British gangster called English, saw him star alongside Brian Austin Green, Michael Clarke Duncan, Vinnie Jones, Danny Trejo and Tom Sizemore in the action Sony picture film Cross. Capaldi worked alongside Morgan Freeman in the children's film, Wish Wizard, a film made in collaboration with the Make-A-Wish Foundation. then in the paranormal moralistic drama The Between, with Isabelle Fuhrman, Joel Courtney and Peter Bogdanovich.

Capaldi briefly expanded into television with appearances as himself in the HDnet reality television series Hollywood Royale.

Capaldi's acting credits include Crossroads and romantic drama Don't Pass Me By, before teaming up with Jason Mewes for a web series, Vigilante Diaries. He went onto star in Devil's Dozen, a horror feature directed by Jeremy London and also starring C. Thomas Howell and Eric Roberts, which premiered at Grauman's Chinese Theatre in Hollywood in 2013.

Capaldi starred in a trio of action films directed by Giorgio Serafini. In Ambushed, Capaldi portrays an uncontrollable Scottish gangster alongside Dolph Lundgren, Vinnie Jones and Randy Couture. Blood of Redemption showcases the softer side of Capaldi as an American FBI agent, and brother to Billy Zane and nephew to Robert Davi, in a constant struggle to vindicate his fathers murder with Dolph Lundgren and Vinnie Jones, on opposite sides of the fence. Capaldi also produced A Certain Justice, starring alongside martial arts specialist, Cung Le, Dolph Lundgren, Vinnie Jones and Briana Evigan.

Capaldi filmed a theatrically released horror feature in Italy about an urban witch legend Janara (2014) where he played an American priest. He continued with filming in Europe in the BBC comedy short film Gasping, set in Scotland with director Greg Hemphill and comedian Frankie Boyle. Gasping was nominated for Best Short Film at the 2015 Edinburgh Film Festival. Capaldi starred in Mickey Rooney's last film Jeckyl and Hyde, leading the cast as Edward Hyde. He then went on to work on Last Man's club, a family film alongside Jake Bussey, Richard Riedle and Kate French.

In 2015, Capaldi starred in Bite, an action horror film shot in Rome, alongside Costas Mandylor and Vinnie Jones, directed by Alberto Sciamma. Capaldi filmed Ghosts of Garip in Turkey playing the lead in an action adventure vampire driven horror alongside Selma Ergeç. Wicked Within, a gothic thriller showed Capaldi's soft side as husband to a possessed wife, Sienna Guillory.

Capaldi costarred in Nightfall, shot in Bulgaria, alongside Robert Englund, before joining up with Lindsay Lohan in Belgium and starring with her in The Shadow Within as a Lieutenant mixed up in a political world of vampires and werewolves. Capaldi led the cast alongside Dominique Swain in the film Deprivation, shot in Rome and directed by Brian Skiba. Capaldi went on to film Chokehold in Canada, starring with Casper Van Dien before heading to Turin, Italy, to film the thriller Ulysses with Danny Glover. Capaldi filmed Paper Empire in Miami, a television show alongside Wesley Snipes, Steve Guttenberg and Val Kilmer.

Capaldi filmed festival bound Cranley Gardens in December in London then he began filming in Alabama, on the Western Hell On The Border alongside Frank Grillo, Ron Perlman and Rudy Youngblood where he portrayed Tom Pinkerton.

In 2018 Capaldi shot Robert The Bruce in Scotland, Astro in Los Angeles, Becoming in Kentucky, a Universal Christmas movie Adventures of Santa in Connecticut alongside Denise Richards and film horror Circus Road. River Runs Red which Capaldi shot last December in Kentucky alongside John Cusack, Luke Hemsworth, Taye Diggs and George Lopez came out theatrically in January 2019 across the USA. Capaldi plays a cop alongside Hemsworth who find themselves in a precarious position.

Capaldi appeared alongside Michael Jai White and Mickey Rourke in action film The Commando (2020).

Deadline Hollywood announced that Capaldi was cast alongside Bruce Willis and Frank Grillo in the movie A Day to Die.

== Films ==
Year	Title	Role	Notes
2005	All In	Sabastian	
2010	Cross	English	
2010	Mandarin Orange Boys	Caspian James	
2010	Wish Wizard	Chevy	
2011	The Martini Shot	Leo	
2011	Crossroads	The Scotsman	
2011	Don't Pass Me By	Chris	
2011	Act of Betrayal	Ryan	
2013	Ambushed	Eddie	
2013	Blood of Redemption	Kurt	
2013	Unbelievable	Scotty	
2013	A Certain Justice	Vin	
2014	Janara	Andrea	
2014	Dr Jekyll and Mr Hyde	Edward Hyde	
2015	Gasping	Frank	
2015	The Wicked Within	Luke	
2015	Last Man Club	Frank	
2015	Bite/Blood Trap	Boria	
2015	The Ghosts of Garip	John	
2015	Nightworld	Martin	
2016	Deprivation	Jake	
2016	Chokehold	Feodor	
2016	Ulysses	Tony	
2017	Isolani	Thomas	
2017	Rottentail	Professor	
2018	Astro	Jesse Ronin	
2019	The Trouble	Johnny Turdo	
2019	Among the Shadows	Lt. McGregor	
2019	Robert the Bruce	David MacDonald	
2019	Cranley Gardens	Mr Leaveaux	
2019	Circus Road	Thomas Ferguson	
2019	Becoming	Dr Andrew Keenan	
2019	My Adventures of Santa	David	
2019	River Runs Red	Rory	
2019	Hell on the Border	Tom Pinkerton	
2022	The Commando	Dominic	
2022	A Day to Die	Tim	
2023	King of Killers	Roman Korza	
2023	The Lurking Fear	Officer Quade	
2024	The Unholy Trinity	Gideon	
2024	Damaged	Glen Boyd	Producer; Also wrote screenplay and story

== Television ==
Year	Title	Role	Notes
2010	Hollywood Royale	Gianni	Season 1 lead post-production
2013	Vigilante Diaries	Nigel Hawkes	
2016	Feel The Dead	Matt	
2019	Still Game	Phone Shop Assistant	
2019	Paper Empire	Sava	
2022	Salvage Marines	Tyrol Gaius	

== Producer ==
Year	Title	Role
2005	Alien Express	Assistant producer
2007	The Martini Shot	Producer
2011	Act of Betrayal	Producer
2013	Hard Rush	Producer
2013	Blood of Redemption	Producer
2013	Certain Justice	Producer
2013	Badge of Honor	Producer
2014	Wicked Within	Producer
