= Call Her King =

Action film by Wes Miller

- Directed by: Wes Miller
- Written by: Wes Miller
- Produced by: Wes Miller; Andrew van den Houten
- Starring: Naturi Naughton; Lance Gross; Jason Mitchell; Johnny Messner; Tobias Truvillion; Nicholas Turturro
- Cinematography: Ron Bowjack Bourdeau
- Edited by: Mike Twin Jones
- Music by: Paul Koch
- Production companies: BET Films; BlackLight Entertainment
- Distributed by: BET+
- Release date: July 6, 2023
- Running time: 109 minutes
- Country: United States
- Language: English

Call Her King is a 2023 American action thriller film written and directed by Wes Miller. The film stars Naturi Naughton as Judge Jaeda King who has just sentenced Sean Samuels (Jason Mitchell) to death when the courthouse is hijacked by his brother Gabriel (Lance Gross). The film also stars Johnny Messner, Tobias Truvillion and Nicholas Turturro.

The film was produced by BET Films and BlackLight Entertainment and released by BET+ on July 6, 2023.

== Cast ==
- Naturi Naughton as Judge Jaeda King
- Lance Gross as Gabriel Samuels/Black Caesar
- Jason Mitchell as Sean Samuels
- Johnny Messner as John Stryker
- Tobias Truvillion as Gerald King
- Nicholas Turturro as Jerry Spencer
- Lawren Miller as Raya King
- Shiobann Amisial as Salima
- Garrett Hendricks as Duke Hawkins
- Han Soto as Alex
- Walter DeShields as Anthony
- Jerry Spencer as U.S Marshall Talberts

== Reception ==
Film critic Brian Orndorf from Blu-ray.com gave it grade "B-" writing: "Call Her King isn’t Die Hard, but it has moments of inspiration and some sense of legal commentary, trying to challenge the system while keeping mild stunt work coming. It’s enough to entertain and, maybe, enlighten." Khalil Johnson from Punch Drunk Critics gave it mixed review writing: "Call Her King isn’t trying to reinvent the wheel in regard to action movies, but it still doesn’t hit all the beats it needs to. Something like this could have been better served as a limited series. This would have meant a better budget as well as more time to flesh things out."
