= African-American Film Critics Association Awards 2015 =

Annual US film awards ceremony

13th African-American Film Critics Association Awards
- Date: February 10, 2016

Highlights
- Best Picture: Straight Outta Compton
- Independent film: Chi-Raq
- Animation: The Peanuts Movie
- Documentary: A Ballerina's Tale
- Best Comedy Series: Black-ish
- Best Drama Series: How to Get Away with Murder

The 2015 African-American Film Critics Association Awards were announced on December 7, 2015, while the ceremony took place on February 10, 2016 at Taglyan Complex, in Hollywood, California.

== Awards ==
Below is the list of complete winners.

=== AAFCA Top Ten Films ===
1. Straight Outta Compton (Universal Pictures)
2. Creed (Warner Bros.)
3. Mad Max: Fury Road (Warner Bros.)
4. Beasts of No Nation (Netflix)
5. The Martian (20th Century Fox)
6. 3 1/2 Minutes and Dope (HBO Films/Open Road Films)
7. Chi-Raq (Roadside Attractions/Amazon Studios)
8. Carol (Weinstein Co.)
9. The Big Short (Paramount Pictures)
10. The Danish Girl (Focus Features)

=== AAFCA Regular Awards ===
Best Picture

- Straight Outta Compton

Best Director

- Ryan Coogler – Creed

Best Actor

- Will Smith – Concussion

Best Actress

- Teyonah Parris – Chi-Raq

Best Supporting Actor

- Jason Mitchell – Straight Outta Compton

Best Supporting Actress

- Tessa Thompson – Creed

Best Ensemble

- Straight Outta Compton

Best Independent Film

- Chi-Raq

Best Screenplay

- Rick Famuyiwa – Dope

Breakout Performance

- Michael B. Jordan – Creed

Best Animation

- The Peanuts Movie

Best Documentary

- A Ballerina's Tale

Best Song

- "See You Again" – Furious 7

Best TV Comedy

- Black-ish

Best TV Drama

- How to Get Away with Murder

Best Cable/New Media TV Show

- Survivor's Remorse

=== AAFCA Special Awards ===
AAFCA Special Achievement Award

- Jeff Clanagan; John Singleton - Codeblack Entertainment and Maverick Carter; LeBron James - SpringHill Entertainment

Cinema Vanguard Award

- HBO

Roger Ebert Award

- Manohla Dargis - The New York Times film critic and journalist.

== See also ==
- 2015 in film
