= A Day to Die =

2022 American film by Wes Miller

- Theatrical release poster
- Directed by: Wes Miller
- Written by: Scott Mallace; Rab Berry; Wes Miller
- Produced by: Wes Miller; Andrew van den Houten; Curtis Nichouls; U. Leo Ohaebosim; DJ Dodd
- Starring: Kevin Dillon; Bruce Willis; Frank Grillo; Mohamed Karim; Leon
- Cinematography: Michael Brouphy
- Edited by: Julie Garcés
- Music by: Paul Koch
- Production companies: Blue Box Entertainment; Sweet Unknown South; Hood River Entertainment; Future Proof Films; High Five Films
- Distributed by: Vertical Entertainment
- Release date: March 4, 2022
- Running time: 105 minutes
- Country: United States
- Language: English
- Budget: $5 million
- Box office: $98,616

A Day to Die is a 2022 American heist action film directed, co-written and co-produced by Wes Miller. It stars Kevin Dillon, Bruce Willis, Frank Grillo, Mohamed Karim, and Leon. The film was released on March 4, 2022, by Vertical Entertainment.

== Premise ==
Connor Connolly, a disgraced parole officer, becomes indebted to a local drug kingpin, Tyrone Pettis, after having no choice but to kill one of the latter's young enforcers (an "asset"). Upon having his pregnant wife Candice abducted by Pettis as leverage, Connor is forced to pull off a series of dangerous drug heists within twelve hours in order to pay the $2 million he now owes. Connor recruits his old teammates to conduct the heists with him, rescue his kidnapped pregnant wife, and settle a score with the city's corrupt police chief Alston who had double-crossed them years ago in a botched hostage situation that led to the former team's disbandment. Alston is secretly in an uneasy alliance with Pettis, who has financed his rise to power. The team goes through with the heists, and confronts Pettis whilst rescuing Candice, before coming to a mutual understanding and engaging in one final heist in an attempt to disrupt Alston's criminal operations. In the end, Connor, Pettis, and Candice successfully flee the country, while Alston, having been recorded during the ongoing heist gunning down one of his subordinates who was catching onto his illicit activities, is arrested.

== Cast ==
- Kevin Dillon as Connor Connolly, a disgraced parole officer and former member of a "ghost" squad
- Bruce Willis as Alston, the police chief
- Frank Grillo as Brice Mason, the ex-captain of a "ghost" squad
- Mohamed Karim as Detective Reynolds, a police officer
- Leon as Tyrone Pettis, the local drug kingpin
- Gianni Capaldi as Tim Connolly, Connor's brother, and a former member of a "ghost" squad
- Brooke Butler as Candice Connolly, Connor's pregnant wife
- Johnny Messner as Deputy Chief Schipp
- Vernon Davis as Dwayne Miller, a former member of a "ghost" squad
- Alexander Kane as Steven Rogers, a former member of a "ghost" squad
- Aspen Kennedy as Joaquin Smith
- Curtis Nichouls as Spade, Pettis' right hand man

== Production ==
Principal photography for A Day to Die began in Jackson, Mississippi in March 2021, as the first feature to be shot in the city in 2021. Filming concluded after six weeks in April, with the final scenes being shot in Hawkins Field Airport. In May 2021, Vertical Entertainment acquired distribution rights to the film.

== Release ==
The film was released in select theaters and through video-on-demand on March 4, 2022, by Vertical Entertainment.

=== Box office ===
A Day to Die grossed $0 in the United States and Canada and $98,616 in Russia and the United Arab Emirates, plus $298,282 with home video sales, against a production budget of $5 million.
