= Viktor Onysko =

Ukrainian film director (1982–2022)

- Віктор Онисько
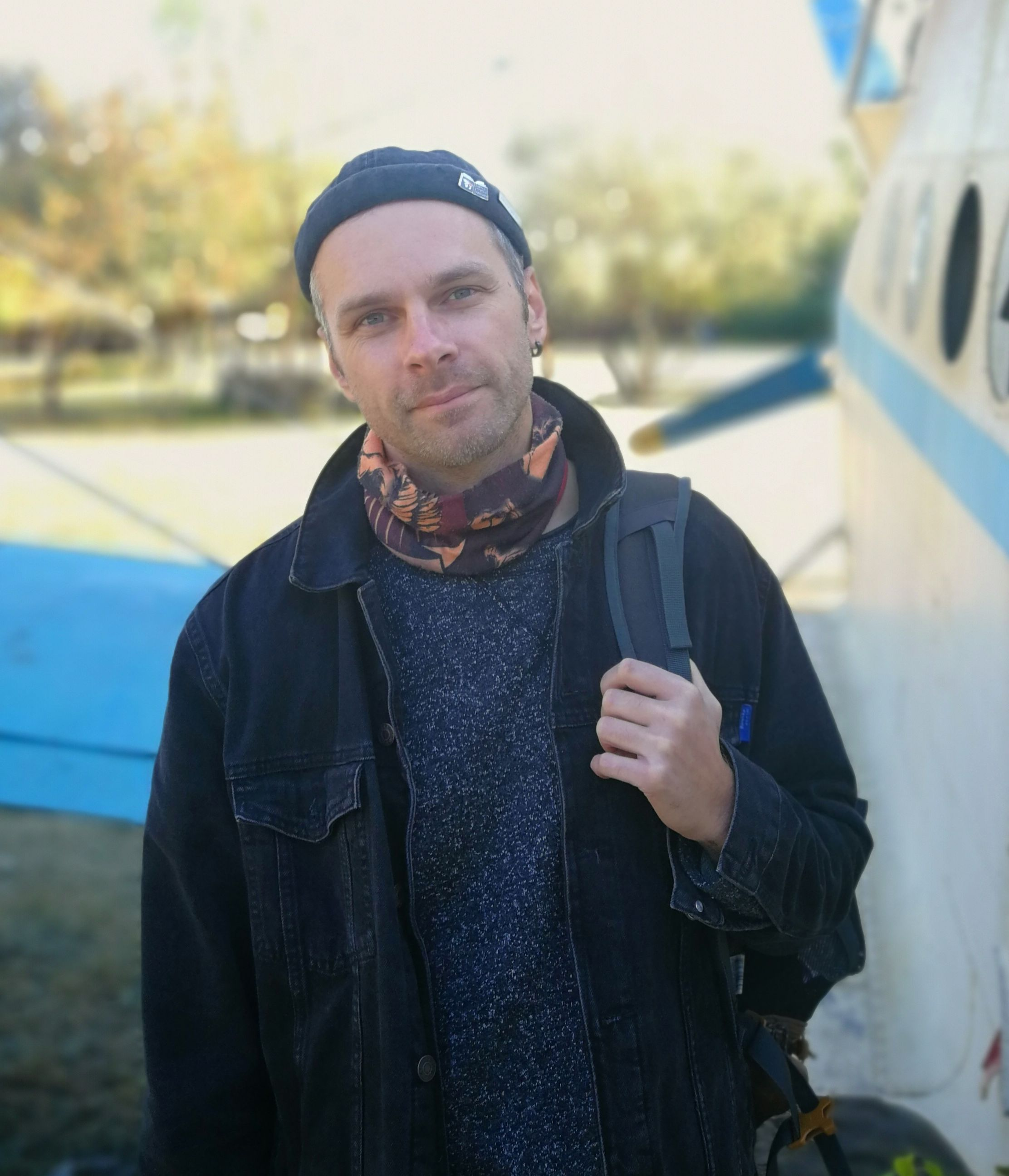
- Onysko in 2021
- Born: 17 December 1982; Kyiv, Ukrainian SSR, Soviet Union
- Died: 30 December 2022 (aged 40) near Soledar, Ukraine
- Education: Kyiv Polytechnic Institute
- Occupation: Film editor
- Spouse: Olga Birzul
- Children: 1

Viktor Petrovych Onysko (Ukrainian: Віктор Петрович Онисько, 17 December 1982 – 30 December 2022) was a Ukrainian film editor and a serviceman of the Armed Forces of Ukraine, participating in the Russo-Ukrainian War.

== Biography ==
Onysko was a Ukrainian film editor. He worked on more than 20 films and series. These include Battle for Sevastopol (2015), The Fall of Lenin (2017), Cherkasy (2019), Cold Blood (2019) and The Rising Hawk (2019).

He participated in the Orange Revolution and Euromaidan.

On 4 March, Onysko came to the military commissariat with a packed bag for enlistment. In the war he received the code name "Tarantino". He participated in military operations on the territory of Kherson Oblast and the Donbas as a member of the 128th Mountain Assault Brigade. Junior lieutenant Onysko died on 30 December 2022 while performing a combat mission, near Soledar. On 5 December 2022, he was buried at the Baikove Cemetery in Kyiv. He left his wife, Olga, and a daughter, Zakhariya.

In August 2023, he was posthumously awarded the Order of Merit Third Class by President Volodymyr Zelenskyy, for his contributions to Ukrainian cinema. The award was refused by his wife because she felt it was disrespectful that filmmakers who stayed in the rear were on the same list as those fighting to defend the country. Additionally, she said that the list of awardees only included those loyal to the Ukrainian State Film Agency.

An episode of Ostannioi ziomky (Ukrainian: Останньої зйомки), a documentary series about creative professionals killed during the Russo-Ukrainian War, was dedicated to his life.

== Filmography ==
=== Films ===
- Presumption of guilt (2007)
- Year of the goldfish (2007)
- Off-world (2007)
- Carassi (2008)
- Indestructible (2015)
- The Stronghold (2017)
- The Fall of Lenin (2017)
- Cold Blood (2018)
- Polina and the mystery of a film studio (2019)
- Given (2019)
- Olha's Italian Diary (2019)
- The Rising Hawk (2019)
- Cherkasy (2019)
- Viddana (2020)
- Roses. Film Cabaret (2021)

=== Series ===
- Dead. Alive. Dangerous (2006)
- Investigator Saveliev's Cordon (2012)
- Butterflies (2013)
- Goodbye, boys (2014)
- Coffee with Cardamom (2021)
