= The Lookalike (2014 film) =

Film by Richard Gray

- Theatrical release poster
- Directed by: Richard Gray
- Written by: Michele Gray
- Produced by: Kaine Harling; Justin Long; Frank Lotito
- Starring: Justin Long; Jerry O'Connell; Gillian Jacobs; Scottie Thompson; John Corbett; Gina Gershon; Steven Bauer; John Savage; Luis Guzmán
- Cinematography: Thomas Scott Stanton
- Edited by: Heath Ryan; Michael Purl
- Music by: Alies Sluiter
- Production companies: Yellow Brick Films; Emedia Films
- Distributed by: Well Go USA Entertainment
- Release date: November 7, 2014 (United States)
- Running time: 100 minutes
- Country: United States
- Language: English

The Lookalike is a 2014 American crime thriller film directed by Richard Gray and written by Michele Gray. The film stars Justin Long, Jerry O'Connell, Gillian Jacobs, Scottie Thompson, John Corbett, Gina Gershon, Steven Bauer, John Savage, and Luis Guzmán. It was released in the United States on November 7, 2014, by Well Go USA Entertainment.

== Plot ==
Former basketball star Joe Mulligan's career ends due to a knee injury, so he sells drugs with his former coach Bobby Zan through his bar Bobby's. One fateful night, several events eventually lead him into a better life.

Drug lord William Spinks is strangely obsessed with Sadie Hill and uses family friends Bobby and Frank to get to her. Soon after Sadie talks to him via phone, as she's telling her friend Drew about being contracted to have sex with him, she bumps into Mila and damages her shoes. Sadie gives her Drew's shop card to replace them.

However, as Sadie's negotiating how much they will pay her to let her father's business partner screw her on camera, the chandelier above the table falls on her head. Her accidental death may jeopardize a major drug deal.

Meanwhile, Joe meets with Vincent to finish paying off his father's gambling debt. Aspiring actress Lacey Fitzgerald meets his brother Holt at Joe's. At the bar, Joe is talking about his dream cooking program. Mila meets someone there who brings her nembutal as she refuses to do more chemo. Joe meets her, finding out she both has a prosthetic leg and is deaf.

Lacey and Holt chat, he is Joe's half-brother and is just visiting. Eventually they decide to hook up, she quietly excuses herself to remove the wire, as she was actually there to help the police nab Joe so she can avoid charges. Meanwhile, Joe and Mila also connect. The difference between the two pairs is, with the first they are mutually dishonest to one other whereas Joe and Mila connect deeply.

Bobby and Frank formulate a shady plan to replace Sadie with a lookalike to fool Spinks. When Joe asks Bobby to help him finance his cooking show, they cut a deal that he help them find a girl. There will be 500,000 to split between Joe and the girl. As Holt desperately needs to pay Vincent 100,000 by Sunday, Joe offers him that amount to find Sadie's lookalike.

The Mulligan brothers are with their respective women, Mila who seems to be holding off euthanizing herself for Joe, Holt realizes Lacey could pass for Sadie. He presents her to Joe the next day, manipulating them both into being on board. Lacey sees it as an acting role, a way to get her career back on track.

Mila meets Drew about the shoes. Later, finding Sadie's photo in Joe's wallet, she returns to the shop and shows her. That night, Frank abducts Drew and tries to drown her, however she escapes. Drew calls Mila while she is confronting Joe, who tells her of his cooking show dream.

Joe asks Bobby about Sadie, Drew comes in demanding Bobby tell her where she is and Frank guns her down. Joe tells Holt the deal is off, as he fears her safety, but his desperate brother ignores his warnings. That evening, Mila chloroforms both Holt and Lacey to take her place.

When Lacey comes to, she warns Joe who races across town, trying to save Mila as he's correctly guessed she's taken Lacey's place. When he arrives, he learns it's basically a snuff film, so Joe hurries to the door, hoping to prevent it. On the video Spinks tells Al, Sadie's father and his former business partner, that his daughter Georgia killed herself. Her note explained Al raped her at 11 on vacation with his family in Versailles, which had caused her lifelong psychological damage. Spinks shoots Mila in the head before Joe bursts in. There is a struggle and Joe turns his gun on him.

Escaping with the money, Joe confronts Frank about Spink's arrangement. When he admits he knew 'Sadie' was meant to be snuffed out, Joe shoots him and takes the money case. Simultaneously, the cops close in on Bobby, who tries to destroy evidence of his coke operation and escape. Officer Garner, after warning him, takes him out.

One morning, Joe gets Mila's letter, explaining her terminal cancer diagnosis. She chose to sacrifice herself to help them. As Bobby is taken to the courthouse to be tried, Lacey meets with Garner to give her the other 10,000 as promised. The officer likewise does her a favor, pointing out that Holt is a cokehead. So, Lacey cuts him loose and takes her dream vacation alone.

Joe takes over the bar, renames it Mila's and gets his cooking show on the air.

== Cast ==
- Justin Long as Holt Mulligan
- John Corbett as Bobby Zan
- Gillian Jacobs as Lacey Fitzgerald / Sadie Hill
- Jerry O'Connell as Joe Mulligan
- Gina Gershon as Lee Garner
- Scottie Thompson as Mila
- Luis Guzmán as Vincent
- Steven Bauer as Frank
- John Savage as William Spinks
- Felisha Terrell as Drew
- Michael Yebba as Detective Stein
- Billy Slaughter as bubbly birthday dude

== Production ==
Australian film producer Kaine Harling greenlit the film into pre-production in early 2012.

Principal photography took place from December 3, 2012, to January 18, 2013, in New Orleans and the Bahamas. Filming was previously set to begin on November 26, 2012.

On February 8, 2013, Arclight Films acquired the international rights to The Lookalike. On November 11, 2013, Well Go USA Entertainment acquired the North American rights to the film. It was released theatrically and on Digital HD in the United States on November 7, 2014.
