= Sugar Mountain (film) =

- Directed by: Richard Gray
- Written by: Abe Pogos
- Produced by: Michele Gray; Richard Gray; Jamie Houge; Virginia Kay; Nick Farnell; John Garrett; Kaine Harling; Steve Ponce
- Starring: Cary Elwes; Jason Momoa; Drew Roy; Haley Webb; Shane Coffey
- Cinematography: John Garrett
- Edited by: Christopher Kroll
- Music by: Alies Sluiter
- Production company: Yellow Brick Films
- Distributed by: Screen Media
- Release date: September 12, 2016
- Running time: 105 minutes
- Country: United States
- Language: English

Sugar Mountain is a 2016 American thriller film directed by Richard Gray and written by Abe Pogos. The film stars Cary Elwes, Jason Momoa, Drew Roy, Haley Webb, and Shane Coffey. Filming began on March 10, 2014 in Seward, Alaska and ended on April 18.

The film was released in the United States on December 9, 2016.

== Plot ==
A man tries to fake going missing for a few days to sell his survival story. But, things quickly get out of hand.

== Cast ==
- Cary Elwes as Jim Huxley
- Jason Momoa as Joe Bright
- Drew Roy as Miles West
- Haley Webb as Lauren Huxley
- Shane Coffey as Liam West
- Melora Walters as Tracey Huxley
- Anna Hutchison as Angie Miller
- John Karna as Josh Miller
- Steve Mouzakis as Randy

== Production ==
The film originally had been set in Australia until the filmmakers found a suitable location in Alaska. The executive producer responsible for arranging a considerable amount of the film finance was Kaine Harling. Principal photography began March 10, 2014 in the town of Seward, lasting six weeks. Filming ended on April 18, 2014.

== Reception ==
On the review aggregator website Rotten Tomatoes, 36% of 11 critics' reviews are positive.
