= Cold Blood (film) =

2019 film by Frédéric Petitjean

- Poster
- Directed by: Frédéric Petitjean
- Written by: Frédéric Petitjean
- Produced by: Olias Barco; Corinne Benichou; Oleg German; Florence Moos
- Starring: Jean Reno; Sarah Lind; Joe Anderson; Samantha Bond
- Cinematography: Thierry Arbogast
- Edited by: Viktor Onysko
- Music by: Xavier Berthelot
- Production company: Screen Media Films
- Distributed by: Universal Pictures
- Release date: 15 May 2019
- Running time: 95 minutes
- Country: France
- Language: English
- Budget: $2.7 Million
- Box office: $1 Million

Cold Blood, also known as Cold Blood Legacy, is a 2019 action thriller film written and directed by Frédéric Petitjean and starring Jean Reno, Sarah Lind, Joe Anderson and Samantha Bond. It was released on 15 May 2019.

== Plot ==
Henry, a professional assassin, retires to a cabin in the frozen forests near the Canadian border. He lives there in isolation and silence until coming across a crashed snowmobile and a seriously injured young woman, who gives her name as Melody. Henry fends off the wolves who attempt to attack her, and begins to treat her wounds, extracting several splinters and shards of woods with the limited means he has at his disposal. However, as the woman heals, he begins to grow suspicious of her lack of personal identity documents, cellphone, and investigates the area around the crash. He demands she leave his house as soon as possible, despite her lack of ability.

Due to Henry's treatment and care of her, Melody begins to recover. Upon seeing Henry sitting outside, back to her, seemingly fishing, she reassembles a gun hidden in her backpack and shoots him in the head. Unbeknownst to her, she shot a straw mannequin. Henry detains her and interrogates her for details. She reveals her true name is Charlie, and she came here to kill Henry to avenge his assassination of her father. Charlie's father, a millionaire, had neglected her all her life, and she wishes only to make his memory proud. Henry reveals he already knew that and the second part of the contract he was hired under was to assassinate her as well. Henry frees her to go into the wild, but she returns to the cabin.

A former bodyguard of her father shows up at the cabin to rescue Charlie. Henry kills him in a shootout. The next morning, tired of his life as an assassin, he calls the police on himself. Charlie hits Henry over the head; he shoots the wolf behind her and seems to be about to shoot her when he drops the cartridge from the gun. He is fatally shot by the police who showed up.

Charlie is taken care of by the police. She returns to Henry's cottage to find he has left her his copy of The Art of War along with the phone number of the person who hired him to kill her.

== Cast ==
- Jean Reno as Henry
- Sarah Lind as Charlie
- Joe Anderson as Kappa
- David Gyasi as Malcolm
- Ihor Ciszkewycz as Davies
- François Guétary as Brigleur
- Samantha Bond as Mrs Kessler
- Jean-Luc Olivier as Mr Kessler
- Larisa Rusnak as Katy

== Reception ==
The film received generally negative reviews. Variety called Cold Blood "instantly forgettable", The Observer named it a "boring thriller" while The Hollywood Reporter said that despite the film featuring a "a breathtaking snow-covered setting" and being "well shot", the "result is a film that’s as nonsensical as it is blandly put together".
