= Kaine Harling =

Australian film producer and cinematographer/cameraman (born 1977)

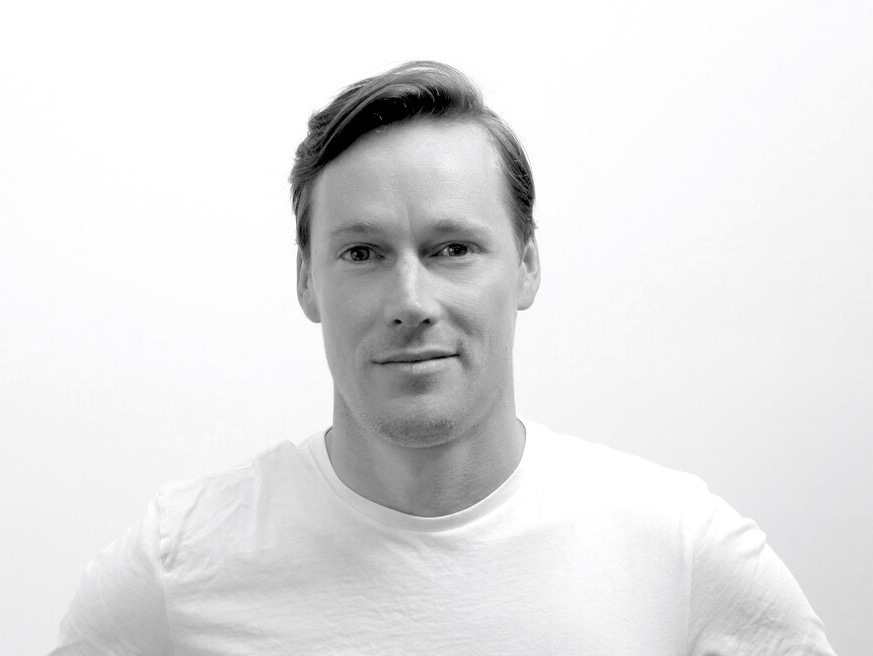
- Harling in 2018
- Born: 25 March 1977 (age 49); Melbourne, Victoria, Australia
- Occupations: Filmmaker, film director, film producer, cinematographer
- Years active: 1998–present
- Awards: Victorian Youth Film Festival, 1993

Kaine Harling (born 25 March 1977) is an Australian film producer and cinematographer/cameraman. His filmography includes Chopper, Ned Kelly, The Lookalike and Sugar Mountain.

Harling divides his time between Melbourne and Oslo.

== Early life ==
Born Kaine Francis Harling in Melbourne, Australia, he is the second child of Jo (née Roche) and James Harling. He produced, directed, shot, and edited his first short film at the age of 16. Titled Robbie's Christmas, it was awarded first place at the Victorian Youth Film Festival in 1993.

== Career ==
After working on several productions as a camera technician, Harling became a freelance cameraman in 2001. Since then, he has worked on feature films, television commercials, music videos, short films, and television series. He began producing feature films after moving to Hollywood in 2012.

Harling has produced three feature films, The Lookalike, Sugar Mountain and Broken Ghost. The Lookalike and Sugar Mountain had successful releases theatrically in the United States and on Netflix internationally.

He is the co-creator, with the creative director Michael Tan, of the Perception Agency, a content creation and digital marketing agency in Melbourne, Australia.

== Filmography ==
- Chopper (2000)
- Crackerjack (2002)
- Ned Kelly (2003)
- Three Dollars (2005)
- Big Mamma's Boy (2011)
- The Lookalike (2014, producer)
- Sugar Mountain (2016, executive producer)
- Broken Ghost (2018, executive producer)
