= Hell on the Border =

- Film poster
- Directed by: Wes Miller
- Written by: Wes Miller
- Starring: David Gyasi; Ron Perlman; Frank Grillo
- Release date: December 13, 2019
- Running time: 106 minutes
- Country: United States
- Language: English

Hell on the Border is a 2019 American Western film written and directed by Wes Miller and starring David Gyasi, Ron Perlman and Frank Grillo. It includes characters based on the true story of Bass Reeves, the first African-American Deputy U.S. Marshal west of the Mississippi River.

== Cast ==
- David Gyasi as Bass Reeves
- Ron Perlman as Charlie Storm
- Frank Grillo as Bob Dozier
- Zahn McClarnon as Sam Sixkiller
- Gianni Capaldi as Tom Pinkerton
- Manu Intiraymi as Judge Isaac C. Parker
- Ashley Atwood as Jessie Winston
- Jaqueline Fleming as Nellie Reeves
- Kerrington Gilbert as Harriet Reeves
- Chris Mullinax as U.S. Marshal Franks
- Michael Aaron Milligan as U.S. Marshal Jim Bruce
- Randy Wayne as Jack "Irish Jack"
- Marshall R. Teague as Senator Smith
- David William Arnott as President Ulysses S. Grant
- Amber Sweet as Belle Starr
- Alexander Kane as Frank James
- Nick Loren as Captain George Reeves
- Rudy Youngblood as Rufus Buck
- Carlos Velazquez as Ned
- Vernon Davis as Columbus
- Curtis Nichouls as Pap
- Rebecca Sheehan Caine as Bob Dozier's wife (uncredited)

== Release ==
The film was released on Blu-Ray and VOD on December 13, 2019.

== Reception ==
The film has a 40% rating on Rotten Tomatoes. Alan Ng of Film Threat gave the film a 7 out of 10.
