= Cross (2011 film) =

- DVD Cover
- Directed by: Patrick Durham
- Written by: Patrick Durham; John Sachar; Tanner Wiley
- Produced by: Patrick Durham; John Sachar; Judy Marie Durham
- Starring: Brian Austin Green; Jake Busey; Lori Heuring; Susie Abromeit; Tom Sizemore; Billy Zabka; Gianni Capaldi; Patrick Durham; John Sachar; Vinnie Jones; Michael Clarke Duncan
- Distributed by: Sony Pictures
- Release date: May 31, 2011
- Running time: 105 minutes
- Country: United States
- Language: English

Cross is a 2011 American action fantasy film written by Patrick Durham, John Sachar, and Tanner Wiley. It was released direct-to-video.

A sequel called Cross Wars was released in 2017, and a third film Cross: Rise Of The Villains was released in 2019.

== Plot ==
Given incredible power by an ancient Celtic Cross, Callan along with the help of weapon experts Riot, Backfire, War, Lucia and Shark battle an unstoppable evil empire led by Erlik in the city of Los Angeles. When an ancient Viking called Gunnar, comes to town in search of blood, Callan must stop him before he destroys the world. Erlik and his men Saw, London gangster English and Slag aided by the evil Doctor aim to defeat Callan by helping Gunnar. Detective Nitti plans to find Callan and his team before they do his job for him.

== Cast ==
- Brian Austin Green as Callan
- Patrick Durham as "War"
- Michael Clarke Duncan as Erlik
- John Sachar as "Shark"
- Tom Sizemore as Detective Nitti
- Vinnie Jones as Gunnar
- William Zabka as "Saw"
- Robert Carradine as "Greek"
- Lori Heuring as Lucia
- Tim Abell as "Riot"
- Jake Busey as "Backfire"
- Gianni Capaldi as English
- C. Thomas Howell as Jake
- Susie Abromeit as "Sunshine"
- Danny Trejo as Lexavier
- Roman Mitichyan as Ara
- Tanner Wiley as the Deviant
- Andre Gordon as Ranger
- Branden Cook as "Slag"
- Judy Marie Durham as April

== Reception ==
Cross received generally negative reviews. IGN gave the film an "Awful" rating of 3/10, while DVD Talk's review recommended to "Skip it". CineMagazine gave the film 1 star.

== See also ==
- Cinema of the United States
