= Among the Shadows =

2019 film by Tiago Mesquita

- Release poster
- Directed by: Tiago Mesquita
- Written by: Mark Morgan
- Produced by: Ross Otterman
- Starring: Charlotte Beckett; Gianni Capaldi; Dominik Madani; Reynald Bialès; Barry Jay Minoff; Kristoffel Verdonck; Olivier Englebert; Peter Organ; Jean-Michel Vovk; John Flanders; Lindsay Lohan
- Cinematography: Tiago Mesquita
- Edited by: Sean Ludan; Florencia P. Marano
- Music by: Carole Sabouraud
- Production companies: Nomenclature Film; Jay-X Entertainment; Future Proof Films
- Distributed by: VMI Worldwide; Momentum Pictures
- Release date: March 5, 2019
- Running time: 96 minutes
- Country: United States
- Language: English

Among the Shadows is a 2019 American supernatural horror thriller film directed by Tiago Mesquita and written by Mark Morgan. The film stars Charlotte Beckett, while Gianni Capaldi, Dominik Madani, Reynald Bialès, Barry Jay Minoff, Kristoffel Verdonck, Olivier Englebert, Peter Organ, Jean-Michel Vovk, John Flanders and Lindsay Lohan appear in supporting roles. The plot follows a private investigator, descendant from a line of werewolves, who tries to solve the murder of her uncle and discovers a political conspiracy. The film was released in the United States on video on demand on March 5, 2019.

== Plot ==
November 13, 2022: Acting under the direction of someone unknown, werewolves foster panic in Brussels by randomly attacking joggers. As part of the same plot, werewolf Randall Jackson fatally shoots werewolf Harry Goldstone, who works on European Federation president Richard Sherman’s reelection campaign. Randall steals Harry's strategy dossier for Richard's upcoming debate against rival John Kilborn. Before dropping dead, Harry calls his werewolf niece, private investigator Kristy Wolfe, to tell her that Randall attacked him.

Lt. McGregor dismisses Kristy from the crime scene. Richard Sherman's vampire wife, first lady Patricia Sherman, hires Kristy to find out who killed Harry and why. McGregor continues angrily confronting Kristy throughout her investigation. McGregor works with detectives Alabastar Blazine and Bastien, with whom Kristy is having a sexual affair, during the official police investigation into Harry’s murder. Kristy tracks down Randall Jackson. Kristy finds Randall with a bag of money, C4 explosives, and a calendar with a December date circled, but Randall escapes following a fight. Richard and Patricia Sherman meet with Richard’s traitorous VP Matthew Benoit and businessman Max Eddelman in a limo. Max proposes to cut Richard in on the profits of a deal with European fossil fuel companies if Richard abandons his renewable energy plan and drops out of the race. Kristy interrupts the meeting to threaten Max over his presumed involvement in conspiratorial murders.

Kristy discovers that someone rigged her car to explode. Kristy tracks down Harry's contact Colin Haroosen, who creates a potion for Kristy intended to prevent werewolves and vampires from reading her thoughts and communicating with her telepathically. Kristy and her longtime friend, bartender Frank, take down werewolf operative Armand. Kristy concludes that there is a mole inside the police department. Kristy asks Blazine to look into the leak, who she suspects could be her lover Bastien.

Patricia discusses the ongoing mystery with the Shermans' lawyer Frederik Forsythe. Frederik receives several blackmail messages urging him to orchestrate Richard Sherman's downfall. Frederik arranges for Detective Blazine to die in a car explosion. McGregor and Kristy realize that whoever killed Blazine set them up to be executed too. Randall tries blowing both of them up, but McGregor and Kristy escape an exploding building. Remembering the date on Randall's calendar, Kristy and McGregor deduce that a plot to assassinate Richard Sherman is about to take place. Kristy and McGregor arrive too late to stop Randall from sniping Richard. Bastien secretly executes Randall before telling Kristy and McGregor that he saw Max Eddelman fleeing. Kristy and McGregor chase after Max. However, Max escapes.

Patricia Sherman runs for president in her dead husband's place. Patricia wins the election. Patricia subsequently has Max, Frederik, and Matthew executed. Kristy confronts Patricia with the revelation that Patricia arranged the entire conspiracy to become president and hired Kristy to look into Harry's murder to deflect suspicion. McGregor joins Kristy in time to kill another werewolf assassin before he can execute Kristy. Patricia uses her vampiric powers to kill McGregor. Patricia subdues Kristy, telepathically reveals her plan, and explains that Kristy will be set up to take the fall, but will be released in 12 months to great riches. Bastien arrests Kristy. Kristy plots to take down Patricia after serving her sentence.

== Cast ==
- Charlotte Beckett as Detective Kristy Wolfe
- Gianni Capaldi as Lieutenant McGregor
- Lindsay Lohan as Patricia Sherman
- Dominik Madani as Colin Haroosen
- Reynald Bialès as Frederick Forsythe
- Barry Jay Minoff as Matthew Benoit
- Kristoffel Verdonck as Richard Sherman
- Olivier Englebert as Bastien
- Peter Organ as Lycan
- Jean-Michel Vovk as Max Eddelman
- John Flanders as Harry Goldstone
- Daniel Hugh Kelly as Bittencourt
- Bond Mgebrishvili as Mason
- Angelina Grace as Angelique
- Gaelle Gillis as Nina
- Simon Cotton as Lon
- John Culliford as Roberts
- Martin Harris as Armond
- Samantha Whaley as Emmy
- Yvonne Miranda as News Anchor
- Véronique Seghers as Jogger

== Production ==
Filming began on November 15, 2015, under the working title The Shadow Within. The film was primarily shot in Brussels, continuing into December 2015 and early 2016.

It is Lohan's first film appearance since The Canyons in 2013. Lohan was cast in the film when producer Ross Otterman asked her to be in it after she had moved to London in the previous year. Otterman stated: "Initially, when we approached her management, it took a while to get any traction until we informed them that we were going to shoot the film in Brussels. After that, everything just kind of came together", continuing about the experience, "We've seen her ability to act, and we know that she can carry pretty much any role that she wants to. She was very professional."

Otterman also talked about the lengthy post-production process, saying it is a common operating procedure for independently financed films, "We shot in five countries over ten months so there's a lot of editing and planning to do, plus sound. The end product took a while", explaining, "but the film was actually finished in 2018, it just takes time to show it to buyers and go through the distribution process [...] We were actually pretty happy [with] the way things turned out."

== Release ==
Among the Shadows was initially acquired by Tombstone Distribution, a subsidiary of Archstone Distribution, in February 2016. The film was then listed for sale at the European Film Market at the Berlin International Film Festival in February 2018, being acquired for distribution by Momentum Pictures, Entertainment One, and VMI Worldwide. It was released in the United States on video on demand (VOD) on March 5, 2019, and on DVD on August 6, 2019. In August 2019, it was released in Japan. The film also had a home video release in Italy by Blue Swan Entertainment on November 6, 2019. It was released on DVD in the United Kingdom on June 29, 2020, by High Fliers Films.

== Reception ==
The film received few reviews from mainstream media outlets, with one negative review listed on Rotten Tomatoes. However, based upon seeing the trailer for it, The Guardian wrote that Lohan was "pioneering a bold new acting theory known as Never Sharing the Frame With Other Characters, So It Looks As If All Your Lines Were Filmed Remotely in a Single Day, And Also Being Quite Rigid and Flat and Squinting in a Manner That Suggests You're Simply Reading Just Your Lines From a Card Off-Screen. When this becomes the accepted form of mainstream screen acting in generations to come, and it will, remember where you saw it first."

Gianni Capaldi, one of the leads in the film, gave his own review of it: "Lindsay plays a vampire and she was an absolute peach to work with. She is a real talent and she owns the stage when she gets in her stride. To be honest I think the film wasn't edited as best as it could have been and it really missed a beat. That and a mishmash of characters was confusing, but it's still worth a watch if you're into that genre." In October 2021, Parade listed Among the Shadows as one of the 31 best werewolf movies, describing it as a "mystery, horror, and political thriller rolled into one package." Seventeen also ranked it at number eight on their "15 Werewolf Movies To Stream During a Full Moon" list.
