= River Runs Red (film) =

2018 American film by Wes Miller

- Directed by: Wes Miller
- Written by: Wes Miller
- Produced by: James T. Bruce IV; Branden Cobb; Jaqueline Fleming; Wes Miller; Curtis Nichouls; Leonard Ohaebosim; Rachel Ryling; Joel Shapiro; Sasha Yelaun
- Starring: Taye Diggs; John Cusack; George Lopez
- Cinematography: Ron Bourdeau; Michael Brouphy; Egor Povolotskiy
- Edited by: Rowan Maher
- Music by: Pierre Heath
- Distributed by: Cinedigm
- Release dates: October 13, 2018 (Heartland); November 9, 2018
- Running time: 94 minutes
- Country: United States
- Language: English
- Box office: $65,167

River Runs Red is a 2018 American thriller film written and directed by Wes Miller and starring Taye Diggs, John Cusack and George Lopez.

== Plot ==
The movie opens with Judge Charles Coleman Sr. teaching his young son about standing up for justice and principles, using boxer and activist Muhammad Ali as an example. Charles eventually becomes a respected judge and one of the few prominent Black legal authorities in his city. He lives with his wife Marilyn, a police officer, and his son CJ, who is preparing to begin training at the police academy. Charles strongly believes in the legal system and has built his entire life around law and justice.

One morning, CJ is driving to his first day at the academy when he crosses paths with two police officers, Rory and Von. Rory is openly racist and aggressive, while Von is quieter and less confrontational. Rory believes CJ insulted him during a traffic encounter when CJ flashes what was actually a harmless hand gesture. Interpreting it as disrespect, Rory pulls CJ over. During the tense stop, CJ reaches for his identification, but Rory falsely assumes he is reaching for a weapon and shoots him. Von also fires during the chaos. CJ is killed instantly.

After the shooting, the officers discover CJ was unarmed. Panicking, Rory plants a handgun in CJ's vehicle to justify the shooting and creates a false narrative claiming CJ threatened them. Von is deeply disturbed by what happened, but Rory pressures him into supporting the fabricated story. The media quickly portrays CJ as a dangerous criminal, and public opinion turns against him despite the lack of evidence.

Charles and Marilyn are devastated by the loss. Marilyn becomes disillusioned with the police force and wants justice for their son, while Charles initially tries to work within the legal system. However, during the official inquiry into the shooting, both Rory and Von lie under oath. The department clears them of wrongdoing, and neither officer faces punishment. Rory refuses to apologize and insists he was simply "doing his job".

Charles begins investigating the officers himself. An older detective named Horace, who once worked with Charles and respects him, secretly helps by uncovering evidence linking Rory and Von to previous suspicious shootings involving unarmed civilians. Horace discovers a pattern of corruption and brutality that has repeatedly been ignored by city officials.

The investigation leads Charles to Javier, another grieving father whose son was also killed by the same officers years earlier. Javier had buried his pain and lost hope in the system, but Charles convinces him that the officers must finally be held accountable. Together, they gather evidence and testimony showing that Rory repeatedly planted the same gun at crime scenes to frame victims after shootings.

Charles attempts to present this evidence to city leadership, including the mayor, but nobody wants to challenge the police department. Officials dismiss the evidence and protect the officers. Charles slowly loses faith in the justice system he once defended. His grief, anger, and frustration transform him from a judge seeking lawful justice into a man consumed by revenge.

Eventually, Charles and Javier decide to confront Rory directly. They kidnap and intimidate him in hopes of forcing a confession. During the confrontation, Rory violently fights back and admits to shooting CJ. A struggle erupts, and Charles shoots Rory in self-defense. Rory dies from the gunshot wounds.

After Rory's death, the police launch a manhunt for Charles and Javier. Horace discovers evidence connecting them to the killing but remains conflicted because he sympathizes with their grief and understands why they snapped.

Charles then tracks down Von, who is now under police protection. Unlike Rory, Von feels genuine guilt and finally admits the truth: CJ never had a weapon, and the shooting was unjustified. Von apologizes and expresses regret for participating in the cover-up. Despite the confession, Charles cannot forgive him for helping destroy his son's life and reputation. Charles shoots and kills Von as well.

The film ends tragically. Charles and Javier are cornered by police officers after the killings, and both men are gunned down.

== Cast ==
- Taye Diggs as Charles Coleman Sr.
- John Cusack as Horace
- George Lopez as Javier
- Luke Hemsworth as Von
- Gianni Capaldi as Rory
- Briana Evigan as Marilyn
- RJ Mitte as Officer Thomas
- Steven Berrebi as Brass One
- Jaqueline Fleming as Professor Lawless
- Jennifer Tao as Eve

== Release ==
The film had its world premiere at the Heartland Film Festival on October 13, 2018. Its theatrical release began on November 9, 2018.

== Reception ==
=== Box office ===
River Runs Red grossed $9,893 in the United States and Canada and $51,896 in other territories for a worldwide total of $61,789.

=== Critical response ===
Glenn Kenny of RogerEbert.com gave it one star.
