= Richard Gray (director) =

Australian film director

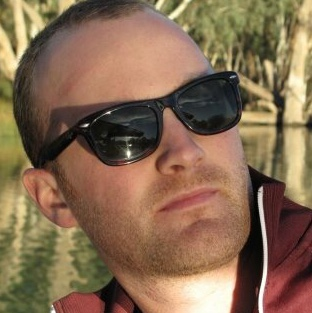
- Richard Gray, 2009
- Born: 25 April 1980 (age 46)
- Citizenship: Australian
- Occupations: Film director, Film producer
- Years active: 2003–present
- Height: 5 ft 10 in (178 cm)
- Spouse: Michele Gray (m. 2009)

Richard Gray is an Australian film director, writer, and film producer.

== Biography ==
Raised in Melbourne, Australia, Gray at age 15 began making short films and working in movie theaters in towns including Forest Hill and Chadstone, Victoria, eventually moving up to projectionist. He earned a bachelor's degree in film from The University of Melbourne's Victorian College of the Arts School of Film and Television in 2003.

After writing the script for the romantic drama Summer Coda in 2004, he spent six years developing and seeking financing for the feature while working in television, including producing and directing the Lifestyle Channel cooking show Stefano’s Cooking Paradiso, starring Stefano de Pieri. In 2005, the script was runner-up in the reality-television screenwriting competition Project Greenlight Australia. He eventually completed Summer Coda, which was released theatrically in 2010, and has gone on to make four additional features, primarily thrillers, through 2016.

== Personal life ==
Richard Gray was married to his wife Michele in Mildura, Victoria, Australia, in 2009. They have two children together.

== Filmography ==
- Summer Coda (2010, director)
- Mine Games (2012, director)
- Blinder (2013, director, writer)
- The Lookalike (2014, director, producer)
- Sugar Mountain (2016, director, producer)
- Broken Ghost (2018, director, producer)
- Robert the Bruce (2019, director)
- Murder at Yellowstone City (2022, director)
- The Unholy Trinity (2024, director)
