= David Gyasi =

Ghanaian British actor (born 1980)

- Born: David Kwaku Asamoah Gyasi; 2 January 1980 (age 46); Hammersmith, London, England
- Education: Middlesex University
- Years active: 2003–present
- Spouse: Emma Gyasi
- Children: 2

David Kwaku Asamoah Gyasi (/ˈdʒæsi/; born 2 January 1980) is an English actor. His films include Cloud Atlas (2012) and Interstellar (2014). On television, he is known for his roles in the BBC series White Heat (2012) and Troy: Fall of a City (2018), the CW miniseries Containment (2016), the Amazon Prime series Carnival Row (2019–2023), and the Netflix political thriller The Diplomat (2023–2025).

== Early life ==
Gyasi was born 2 January 1980 in Hammersmith, London, one of seven children to Ashanti Ghanaian parents who had arrived in England in 1966. They nearly divorced when he was young. Gyasi grew up in Fulham and Hayes. He attended Bishopshalt School and completed his A Levels at East Berkshire College. He went on to study Drama at Middlesex University.

== Career ==
Gyasi landed his first main television role as Jeremy Hands in the 2005 ITV comedy Mike Bassett: Manager, a follow-up to Mike Bassett: England Manager (2001), and his first major film role that same year in Michael Caton-Jones' Shooting Dogs. Gyasi appeared alongside Kit Harington in the 2008 National Theatre production of War Horse.

In 2012, Gyasi starred in the science fiction film Cloud Atlas as a Moriori slave called Autua; his inaccurate casting caused controversy for perpetuating false stereotypes about Moriori people. He then played young Victor (played by Hugh Quarshie later in the character's life) in the BBC Two historical drama White Heat. This was followed by roles in the BBC One television film The Whale (2013) and Christopher Nolan's Interstellar (2014), the latter of which earned him a Black Reel Award nomination for Best Breakthrough Performance. Gyasi was cast as the lead of The Interceptor, also on BBC One, but had to drop out due to a heel injury. The role was taken over by O. T. Fagbenle.

Gyasi starred as Major Alex "Lex" Carnahan in 2016 the CW miniseries Containment. He went on to portray Achilles in the 2018 BBC and Netflix adaptation of The Iliad, titled Troy: Fall of a City. From 2019 to 2023, he starred as Agreus in the Amazon Prime fantasy series Carnival Row. He also led the Western film Hell on the Border and appeared in Cold Blood, Maleficent: Mistress of Evil, and Come Away. He had a recurring role as Ben Chambers in series 3 of The A Word.

Since 2023 he has played British Foreign Secretary Austin Dennison in the Netflix series The Diplomat.

== Personal life ==
Gyasi began dating his wife Emma (née Llaudes) during sixth form at East Berkshire College. They had their first child, a daughter Elèna, in 1999; she is now an actress. The couple married that year and later had their second child, a son Nathaniel. The family settled in a Buckinghamshire village. Gyasi is a practising Anglican.

== Filmography ==
=== Film ===
Year	Title	Role	Notes
2003	What a Girl Wants	Ian's Band Member	
2005	Shooting Dogs	François	
2006	Shoot the Messenger	Timothy	
2012	Red Tails	Corporal	
2012	The Dark Knight Rises	Skinny Prisoner	
2012	Cloud Atlas	Autua / Lester Rey / Duophysite	
2014	Interstellar	Romilly	
2018	Annihilation	Daniel	
2018	Hunter Killer	The Chief of the Boat of USS Arkansas	
2019	Cold Blood	Malcolm	
2019	Maleficent: Mistress of Evil	Percival	
2019	Hell on the Border	Bass Reeves	
2020	Come Away	Captain Hook	
2021	Ear for Eye	US Dad	

=== Television ===
Year	Title	Role	Notes
2003	Goal	Joe Saunders	1 episode
2003–2004	Casualty	Bryce	2 episodes
2004	Murder City	Reporter	1 episode
2004	William and Mary	Policeman	1 episode
2005	Sea of Souls	Lucas Hegarty	2 episodes
2005	Dream Team	Marlon	1 episode
2005	No Angels	Leonard	1 episode
2005	The Brief	DS Kitson	1 episode
2005	Mike Bassett: Manager	Jeremy Hands	5 episodes
2005	The Bill	Jason Fielding	1 episode
2005–2007	Doctors	Joe Fisher / Sean Foster	2 episodes
2006	Torchwood	Hospital Patient	1 episode
2007	Coming Up	Marlon	1 episode
2007	Silent Witness	DS Ian Cross	1 episode
2008	Waking the Dead	Charlie Ayanike	2 episodes
2008	Apparitions	Father Daniel	2 episodes
2009	Demons	Physics Teacher	1 episode
2009	Law & Order: UK	Lennie Gaines	1 episode
2009	Murderland	Will	2 episodes
2010	Holby City	Moses Abebe	1 episode
2012	White Heat	Victor	Main role; 6 episodes
2012	Doctor Who	Harvey	1 episode
2013	The Whale	Peterson	Television film
2016	Containment	Lex Carnahan	Lead role
2017	Man in an Orange Shirt	Steve	Episode 2
2018	Troy: Fall of a City	Achilles	8 episodes
2019–2023	Carnival Row	Agreus	Main role
2020	The A Word	Ben	5 episodes
2022	The Sandman	The Grey Cat (voice)	Episode: "Dream of a Thousand Cats"
2022	The Bastard Son & The Devil Himself	Marcus Edge	3 episodes
2023–2025	The Diplomat	Foreign Secretary Austin Dennison	Main role

== Stage ==
Year	Title	Role	Notes
2006	Much Ado About Nothing	Claudio	Library Theatre, Manchester
2008–2009	War Horse	Lieutenant Stewart / Rudi	Royal National Theatre, London
