= Puncture Wounds =

- Promotional release poster
- Directed by: Giorgio Serafini; James Coyne
- Written by: James Coyne
- Produced by: Agustin; Gianni Capaldi; Phillip B. Goldfine; Cung Le; Dolph Lundgren
- Starring: Cung Le; Dolph Lundgren; Vinnie Jones; Briana Evigan
- Cinematography: Marco Cappetta
- Edited by: John Quinn
- Music by: Brian Jackson Harris; Justin Raines; Michael Wickstrom
- Production companies: Grindstone Entertainment Group; Hollywood Media Bridge; Picture Perfect Corporation; Voltage Pictures
- Distributed by: Lionsgate Home Entertainment
- Release date: March 11, 2014
- Running time: 96 minutes
- Country: United States
- Language: English

Puncture Wounds (produced and released internationally as A Certain Justice) is a 2014 American action film directed by Giorgio Serafini and James Coyne, and starring Cung Le, Dolph Lundgren, Vinnie Jones, and Briana Evigan. The film follows John Nguyen, a war veteran suffering from posttraumatic stress disorder. After he rescues a prostitute, Hollis, a local crime lord, marks them for death. It was released direct to video in the United States on March 11, 2014, followed by a limited release in other countries.

== Plot ==
John Nguyen is a veteran suffering from posttraumatic stress disorder. Despite his status as a war hero, he has difficulty adjusting to civilian life. When he hears a woman scream, he investigates and gets into a fight with several Aryan Nation thugs who are hassling Tanya, a prostitute in the service of local crime boss Hollis. Tanya is horrified when John kills all but one of the thugs; although thankful for his help, she says that John has doomed them both to die at Hollis' hands. Planning to flee the city, Tanya buys a bus ticket, but Hollis convinces her to stay by promising her that she can come off the streets and live with him again. Hollis directs his lieutenant Vin to murder John's family. Although reluctant, Vin complies. Enraged, John tracks down Bennett, a drug dealer, and strikes back at Hollis' meth business, brutally killing several of the men responsible for his family's death.

As Hollis and John war with each other, two cops try to solve the case. Sgt. Mitchell believes John to be honorable, while his partner, a dirty cop in the employ of Hollis, attempts to derail the investigation. John recruits his disabled war buddy J. P. to help him in the final confrontation with Hollis. As Hollis is in the midst of violently raping Tanya, Vin intercedes. Before Vin and Hollis can come to blows, John assaults Hollis' house. John kills most of Hollis' henchmen and leaves Vin to die after a knife fight. Although John captures Hollis, reinforcements arrive and turn the tide against him. Both John and J. P. are captured, and Hollis murders J. P. John challenges Hollis to a one-on-one fight, and, when John appears to be winning, Tanya shoots and kills Hollis' remaining henchmen before they can interfere. After John kills Hollis, Mitchell arrives and tells him to leave the scene of the crime, as he will clean it up.

== Cast ==
- Cung Le as John Nguyen
- Dolph Lundgren as Hollis
- Vinnie Jones as Bennett
- Briana Evigan as Tanya
- Gianni Capaldi as Vin
- James C. Burns as Sergeant Terry Mitchell
- Sean O'Bryan as Detective David Farragut
- Robert LaSardo as Magico
- Jonathan Kowalsky as J.P.
- Jake Jacobson as O'Hanrahan
- Scott Sheeley as Carsen

== Production ==
Shooting took 17 days. Cung Le said that he suffered several minor injuries but considers this his best acting performance so far.

== Release ==
=== Home media ===
Puncture Wounds was released direct to video in the United States on March 11, 2014.

== Reception ==
=== Critical response ===
Eoin Friel, of The Action Elite, praised Puncture Wounds, saying despite the film not having a "huge budget" or "spectacular action", it does have "plenty of hand-to-hand" combat and "well-developed characters". According to Friel, none of characters are "one dimensional or over the top", and Dolph Lundgren is "very restrained" and "genuinely scary" in his role. He went on to say that the script didn't have any "clunky dialogue", and to him, the "whole film" had a "real and gritty approach".

Ian Jane, of DVD Talk, awarded the film 3 out of 5 stars. He called it "fast paced and enjoyable if not particularly original", writing that "elements" were "borrowed" from First Blood and Rolling Thunder. Jane criticized the film's cinematography, saying that it relies "too heavily on shaky cam tactics". On the other hand, he complimented the film for being "fast paced, reasonably well acted, [very] violent and generally [a] solid [piece of] entertainment" for the "less demanding action movie aficionado". He summed up his review by calling Puncture Wounds a "satisfying low budget action movie".

Matthew Tilt, of Stafford FM, gave the film a negative review, claiming that in "many ways", James Coyne made the "same mistake in his script as Nick Love did with the British thriller Outlaw. He takes a very real issue; the treatment of ex-soldiers, which is alluded to in a brief scene early on, and then goes on to portray them as mindless psychopaths". Describing the directing as "poor", Tilt said the only positive aspect of the film "would be some well-choreographed actions scenes", but even then it's "too much".

Geek Syndicate heavily criticized the film, awarding 1 out of 5 stars. According to the website, the film is "clearly" one of those straight-to-video productions that Lundgren "hams up" for a pay check in between making sequels to The Expendables. They went on to say the film is "pretty brutal" and "cruel" in places, and that it adds nothing to the story except "shock value". The review was summed up by advising any readers to "save" themselves the effort and "give the film a miss".
