= Blood of Redemption =

- Promotional release poster
- Directed by: Giorgio Serafini; Shawn Sourgose
- Written by: Rey Reyes; Giorgio Serafini; Shawn Sourgose
- Produced by: Brittany Bowden; Gianni Capaldi; Andre Relis
- Starring: Dolph Lundgren; Billy Zane; Gianni Capaldi; Vinnie Jones; Robert Davi
- Cinematography: Marco Cappetta
- Edited by: Danny Saphire
- Music by: Riccardo Eberspacher
- Production companies: High Five Films; VMI Worldwide
- Distributed by: Entertainment One Films
- Release dates: September 24, 2013 (United States and Canada)
- Running time: 85 minutes
- Country: United States
- Language: English
- Budget: $2 million

Blood of Redemption is a 2013 American crime action thriller film directed by Giorgio Serafini and Shawn Sourgose. The film was released on direct-to-DVD and Blu-ray in the United States and Canada on September 24, 2013. The film stars Dolph Lundgren, Billy Zane, Gianni Capaldi, Vinnie Jones and Robert Davi.

== Plot ==
Quinn is the son of a famous and powerful mobster. In the course of one night, he loses everything. Betrayed by someone from his inner circle, Quinn is set up and arrested. His father (the patriarch of the criminal empire) is killed, and his brother suspects he is behind it all. When he is released from jail, he tries to escape the demons from his past, but that becomes an impossible task. Campbell is the ruthless new leader of "The Company", and he will not let Quinn live in peace. So instead of escaping them, Quinn begins to fight back. He joins forces with his former henchman and friend, The Swede, and tries to regain his powerful position within the mafioso by fighting his enemies head on.

== Cast ==
- Dolph Lundgren as Axel "The Swede"
- Billy Zane as Quinn Forte Grimaldi
- Gianni Capaldi as Kurt Grimaldi
- Vinnie Jones as Campbell
- Robert Davi as Hayden
- Robert Miano as Sergio Grimaldi
- Massi Furlan as Boris
- LaDon Drummond as Agent West
- Stephanie Rae Anderson as Escort #1
- Manny Ayala as Bum Hitman
- Al Burke as Officer Bauer
- Zoli Dora as Campbell Henchman #2
- Mario E. Garcia as Officer Paul Crain
- Jelly Howie as Loryn
- Clint Glenn Hummel as Private Evans
- Elisabeth Hunter as Officer Smith
- Scott Ly as Lin Chau
- Gus Lynch as Officer Brown
- Marcus Natividad as Asian Assassin
- Brad Nelson as Junkyard
- Tasha Reign as Senator's Escort #1
- Raven Rockette as Lin Chau's Escort
- Gilbert Rosales as Man Outside Bar
- Chuck Saale as LAPD Captain Bruce
- Jenny Shakeshaft as Call Girl
- Rikki Six as Senator's Escort #2
- James Storm as Senator Roswald
- Reena Tolentino as Gorgeous Woman
- Scott Vancea as Quinn
- Franco Vega as Officer Hunter

== Release ==
=== Home media ===
Entertainment One Films released the DVD and Blu-ray on September 24, 2013, in the United States and Canada.

== Reception ==
=== Critical response ===
Nav Qateel of Influx Magazine gave the film a C+ rating and called it a "guilty pleasure". Ian Jane of DVD Talk rated it 2/5 stars and wrote that the film fails to live up to its potential as a fun B film. David Johnson of DVD Verdict wrote, "While Blood of Redemption isn't embarrassingly terrible, it leaves much to be desired as a crime thriller, burdened by clunky storytelling, indifferent acting, and unsatisfactory plot twists. As an action film, it's even more wanting."

== See also ==
- Dolph Lundgren filmography
