= Jason Mitchell =

American actor (born 1987)

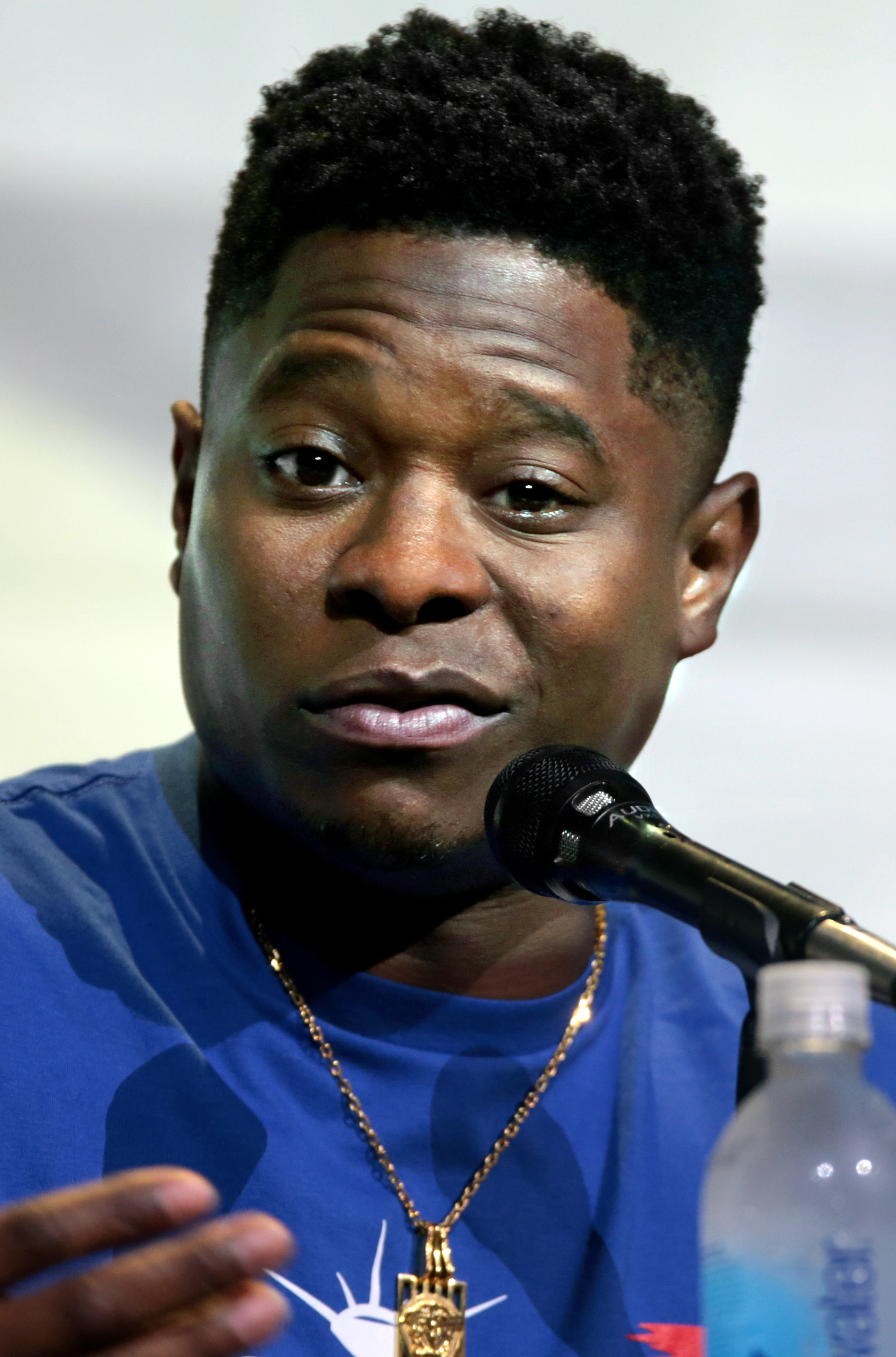
- Mitchell in 2016
- Born: January 5, 1987 (age 39); Würzburg, Germany
- Occupation: Actor
- Years active: 2007–present

Jason Mitchell (born January 5, 1987) is an American actor. Mitchell started his career acting in minor roles in films such as the action-thriller Contraband (2012), and the neo‑noir Broken City (2013). He is best known for portraying rapper Eazy-E in the 2015 biopic Straight Outta Compton. The film is considered his career breakthrough, for which he received numerous award nominations including the Screen Actors Guild Award for Outstanding Ensemble Cast in a Motion Picture. Mitchell has also appeared in the Key and Peele comedy film Keanu (2016), the Netflix film Barry (2016), James Franco's The Disaster Artist (2017), and the blockbuster Kong: Skull Island (2017). He has also appeared in critically acclaimed films such as Kathryn Bigelow's crime drama Detroit (2017), Dee Rees' historical drama Mudbound (2017) and Janicza Bravo's black comedy Zola (2021).

Mitchell is also known for his television roles, making guest appearances in the Amazon Studios limited series Philip K. Dick's Electric Dreams (2018), Alan Yang's dark comedy series Forever acting alongside Hong Chau. Starting in 2018 he was cast in Lena Waithe's Showtime series The Chi until 2019 when he was accused of multiple allegations of misconduct and subsequently fired from the show. He was also dropped by several talent agencies.

== Career ==
Mitchell had his film debut in 2011 as a 7-Eleven cashier in the crime film Texas Killing Fields. He continued acting in minor roles such as the action-thriller Contraband (2012) starring Mark Wahlberg, and the political neo-noir Broken City (2013) starring Russell Crowe and Wahlberg.

In 2014, Mitchell made his film breakthrough when he was cast as Compton rapper Eazy-E in the F. Gary Gray directed biopic Straight Outta Compton, with his performance being met with significant praise by critics. He received multiple awards nominations including the Screen Actors Guild Award for Outstanding Performance by a Cast in a Motion Picture. In 2016, he appeared in Keanu, which starred Keegan-Michael Key and Jordan Peele, and in the Netflix biopic about Barack Obama.

In 2017 starred as a Vietnam War officer in the blockbuster monster movie, Kong: Skull Island. That same year he also appeared in James Franco's comedy film The Disaster Artist. He also starred in two critically acclaimed films, Kathryn Bigelow's crime drama Detroit starring John Boyega, Kaitlyn Dever, and Will Poulter and Dee Rees' historical drama Mudbound. For the later he received the Independent Spirit Robert Altman Award and the Gotham Award for Outstanding Ensemble Performance along the cast which included Carey Mulligan, Jason Clarke, Jonathan Banks, and Mary J. Blige. Mitchell also received his second Screen Actors Guild Award for Outstanding Ensemble Cast in a Motion Picture nomination.

Michell has also made appearances in television including in the Amazon Studios limited series Philip K. Dick's Electric Dreams (2017) where he appeared in the episode, "Kill all Others". He also appeared in the Alan Yang created dark comedy series Forever (2018) starring in the episode "Andre and Sarah", playing Andre with Hong Chau playing Sarah. The episode was critically acclaimed for its storytelling and performances. In 2018, Mitchell starred in the Lena Waithe's Showtime drama series The Chi, but did not return for a third season due to his misconduct allegations.

== Controversies ==
=== Sexual misconduct allegations ===
In May 2019, Mitchell was fired from The Chi when showrunner Ayanna Floyd Davis and co-star Tiffany Boone accused him of sexual misconduct. Boone was among many actresses who "made repeated complaints of sexual harassment" against Mitchell and said she felt "unsafe" around him.

While creator and showrunner Lena Waithe claimed that Mitchell had never acted inappropriately towards her, she knew of the allegations after filming had wrapped on season one of The Chi. Waithe reportedly sought preemptive and corrective measures to handle the situation. She stated that there had been extensive sexual harassment training on set and that she confronted Mitchell about the allegations by saying, "There was definitely a conversation where I called him and got really real". Waithe alleged the harassment and misconduct allegations continued into season two despite the corrective measures taken.

Mitchell denied the multiple allegations of sexual harassment and misconduct against him saying, "I'm all for the Me Too movement...but I think in this situation, [Floyd Davis] tried to use it as a really, really ugly weapon". Mitchell was subsequently fired from the Netflix film Desperados, and was dropped by United Talent Agency and Authentic Talent & Literary Management.

=== Criminal charges ===
On April 22, 2020, Mitchell was arrested in Harrison County, Mississippi, on multiple counts, including "possession of a controlled substance with intent to distribute and possession of a firearm by a felon." Officers searched his SUV and found about 2 pounds of marijuana with a bag of 1,300 dosage units of ecstasy. Deputies also found an AK-47 firearm and a Glock 9mm pistol with extended magazines. Mitchell was released after posting a $150,000 surety bond.

== Filmography ==
=== Film ===
Year	Title	Role	Director	Notes
2011	Texas Killing Fields	7-Eleven Cashier	Ami Canaan Mann	
2012	Contraband	Walter	Baltasar Kormákur	
2012	Dragon Eyes	J-Dog	John Hyams	
2013	Broken City	Cast Friend #1	Allen Hughes	
2015	Straight Outta Compton	Eazy-E	F. Gary Gray	
2016	Keanu	Bud	Peter Atencio	
2016	Vincent N Roxxy	Cordell	Gary Michael Schultz	
2016	Barry	PJ	Vikram Gandhi	
2017	Kong: Skull Island	Glenn Mills	Jordan Vogt-Roberts	
2017	Detroit	Carl Cooper	Kathryn Bigelow	
2017	Mudbound	Ronsel Jackson	Dee Rees	
2017	The Disaster Artist	Nate	James Franco	
2018	Tyrel	Tyler	Sebastián Silva	
2018	Superfly	Eddie	Director X	
2019	The Mustang	Henry Cooper	Laure de Clermont-Tonnerre	
2020	Zola	Dion	Janicza Bravo	
2021	For the Love of Money	Gregory	Leslie Small	
2023	Call Her King	Sean Samuels	Wes Miller	
2023	Scarborn	Domingo	Paweł Maślona	

=== Television ===
Year	Title	Role	Notes
2015	Major Crimes	Twizz	Episode: "Snitch"
2017–18	Freedom Fighters: The Ray	John Trujillo / Black Condor	Voice; Web series
2018–19	The Chi	Brandon Johnson	20 episodes
2018	Philip K. Dick's Electric Dreams	Lenny	Episode: "Kill All Others"
2018	Forever	Andre	Episode: "Andre and Sarah"

== Awards and nominations ==
Year	Award	Project	Result	Ref.
2015	Screen Actors Guild Award for Outstanding Performance by a Cast in a Motion Picture	Straight Outta Compton	Nominated	
2015	Empire Award for Best Male Newcomer	Straight Outta Compton	Nominated	
2015	Hamptons International Film Festival Award for Breakthrough Performer	Straight Outta Compton	Won	
2015	Washington D.C. Area Film Critics Association Award for Best Ensemble	Straight Outta Compton	Nominated	
2015	San Diego Film Critics Society Award for Best Performance by an Ensemble	Straight Outta Compton	Nominated	
2015	African-American Film Critics Association Award for Best Supporting Actor	Straight Outta Compton	Won	
2015	African-American Film Critics Association Award for Best Ensemble	Straight Outta Compton	Won	
2015	Alliance of Women Film Journalists Award for Best Ensemble Cast	Straight Outta Compton	Won	
2015	Black Reel Award for Best Supporting Actor	Straight Outta Compton	Nominated	
2015	Black Reel Award for Best Breakthrough Performance	Straight Outta Compton	Nominated	
2016	San Diego International Film Festival Rising Star Award	Career Achievement	Awarded	
2017	Screen Actors Guild Award for Outstanding Performance by a Cast in a Motion Picture	Mudbound	Nominated	
2017	Critics' Choice Movie Award for Best Acting Ensemble	Mudbound	Won	
2017	Independent Spirit Robert Altman Award	Mudbound	Won	
2017	Gotham Award for Best Ensemble Performance	Mudbound	Won	
2017	Hollywood Film Award for Breakout Ensemble	Mudbound	Won	
2017	Detroit Film Critics Society Award for Best Ensemble	Mudbound	Nominated	
2017	Washington D.C. Area Film Critics Association Award for Best Supporting Actor	Mudbound	Nominated	
2017	Washington D.C. Area Film Critics Association Award for Best Ensemble	Mudbound	Nominated	
2017	Black Reel Award for Best Supporting Actor	Mudbound	Won	
2017	Black Reel Award for Best Ensemble	Mudbound	Won	
