= 1985 in American television =

In 1985, television in the United States saw a number of significant events, including the debuts, finales, and cancellations of television shows; the launch, closure, and rebranding of channels; changes and additions to network affiliations by stations; controversies, business transactions, and carriage disputes; and the deaths of individuals who had made notable contributions to the medium.

== Events ==
Date	Event
January 1	VH1 begins in the United States.
January 4	Sesame Street broadcasts its 2,000th episode.
January 7	During an appearance on ABC's Good Morning America, actor Yul Brynner, who was suffering from terminal lung cancer, mentioned his wish to make a public service announcement to be run after his death to tell others to not smoke.
January 20	For the first time ever, the Super Bowl is televised by ABC, who join the annual broadcast rotation of the game with CBS and NBC. This also marked the first time that a Super Bowl had closed captioning provided in real-time. In this game, the San Francisco 49ers would defeat the Miami Dolphins 38-16.
January 24	The first part of a two part Family Ties episode airs on NBC concerning Elyse Keaton going into labor while performing on-air at her husband, Steven's TV station.
February 4	NBC becomes the first commercial television network to use satellite interconnection for its stations; as a result, it is the first network to discontinue use of chime intonations at the beginning of each telecast, to signal to its affiliates to start broadcasting the network feed.
February 8	CBS airs the final episode of The Dukes of Hazzard.
February 10	CBS airs the first part of a two part miniseries that examines the so-called "Atlanta child murders" of the late 1970s and early 1980s. Atlanta officials criticized The Atlanta Child Murders, claiming that it distorted the facts of the case. After a series of negotiations, CBS executives agreed to insert a disclaimer alerting viewers that the film is based on fact but contains fictional elements.
February 23	On NBC, the Gimme a Break! episode "Cat Story", becomes the show's very first episode filmed before a live audience.
March 3	Moonlighting, which stars Bruce Willis and Cybill Shepherd, debuts on ABC.
March 18	Capital Cities Communications, a station owner group based in Albany, New York, stuns the broadcast industry by announcing that it is acquiring ABC for $3.5 billion. The move will prompt the company to sell off several of its television and radio stations to satisfy FCC ownership limits. The deal will be finalized on January 3, 1986.
March 20	Norman Lear sells Tandem Productions and Embassy Television companies to The Coca-Cola Company, which also owns Columbia Pictures company, for $485 million.
March 22	KXXV signs on the air in Waco as an NBC affiliate. However, the NBC affiliate didn't last long, and it moved to ABC.
March 31	The World Wrestling Federation (now WWE) telecasts WrestleMania to select pay-per-view areas (and to a greater extent, closed-circuit locations across the country). The event is wildly successful (drawing over a million viewers on closed-circuit) and marks the beginning of the annual series of WrestleMania events which continue to air on pay-per-view to this day. There is, however, a near-riot in Pittsburgh when a technical glitch prematurely ends the feed at the Civic Arena, prompting the WWF to appease angry fans by showing the event in its entirely on ABC affiliate WTAE-TV two weeks later.
April 1	Financial News Network stopped airing on broadcast stations, and began a 24-hour cable feed, with the introduction of Score.
April 3	Charles in Charge airs its last episode on CBS, ending its network run after a single season. A year and a half later, the show is revived for the first-run syndicated market, where it will run for four additional seasons.
April 6	The first edition of World Championship Wrestling to be produced by Jim Crockett Promotions airs on TBS.
April 9	The series finale of Three's a Crowd airs on ABC, ending John Ritter's run as Jack Tripper which began with the debut of Three's Company back in 1977.
April 11	KMSS commences broadcasting in Shreveport, Louisiana, making it the first station in the market to sign on the air since KTBS signed on in 1955 and the first independent station in the market. It would later become one of the few charter affiliates of Fox in Louisiana.
April 27	Frank Glieber makes what turns out to be his final play-by-play assignment for CBS Sports, which is game one of the NBA playoff series between the Los Angeles Lakers and Portland Trail Blazers. Glieber would die of a heart attack four days later. Glieber was also scheduled to call game four of the Los Angeles-Portland series alongside James Brown for CBS, but he would ultimately be replaced by Verne Lundquist.
April 28	WLIG commences broadcasting. (The call letters would change to WLNY-TV on September 1, 1996).
April 29	The two-night adaptation of Ken Follett's The Key to Rebecca, shown on WPIX Channel 11 in New York City, has non-pixelated toplessness from both of its female stars, Season Hubley and Lina Raymond.
May 4	News Corporation and 20th Century Fox Film Corporation announces their intent on purchasing Metromedia's television stations and Metromedia Producers Corp. for $3.5 billion. This would soon lay the ground work for the Fox Broadcasting Company, which would debut in October 1986.
May 4	Diff'rent Strokes airs its last episode on NBC, after seven seasons on the air. Months later, it will move to ABC for its eighth and final season.
May 9	Nicholas Colasanto makes his final appearance as Coach Ernie Pantusso on the NBC sitcom Cheers. While he technically last appeared in the cold opening of "Rescue Me", Colasanto's last filmed appearance as Coach was in the episode "Cheerio, Cheers". Following Colasanto's death, Woody Harrelson, would join the cast as his replacement, Woody Boyd beginning in the fourth season.
May 11	The first episode of Saturday Night's Main Event is broadcast by NBC, the first time that professional wrestling has been broadcast by network television since the 1950s.
May 11	Dolph Sweet makes his final appearance as Chief Carl Kanisky on Gimme a Break!. The season 4 finale aired on NBC three days after his death.
May 12	During halftime of the Boston Celtics–Philadelphia 76ers NBA playoff game, CBS televises the first ever NBA draft lottery.
May 14	On The CBS Morning News, co–anchor Phyllis George interviews false rape accuser Cathleen Mae Webb and the man whom she had falsely accused, Gary Dotson. In an effort to get the two to make amends to each other, George makes a simple suggestion: "How about a hug?" Both Webb and Dotson graciously refuse. That infamous interview alienates audiences and is blasted by critics, helping to put an unpleasant close to George's television career at this initial mark.
May 15	The season 5 finale of Dynasty on ABC sees the entire wedding party of Amanda Carrington (Catherine Oxenberg) and Prince Michael of Moldavia (Michael Praed) shot by revolutionaries in what is known as the Moldavian Massacre.
May 17	The season 8 finale of Dallas on CBS finds character Bobby Ewing (Patrick Duffy) on his deathbed after his crazed ex-sister-in-law Katherine Wentworth (Morgan Brittany) runs him down with her car.
May 19	WOIO-TV commences broadcasting in Cleveland. Initially an independent station, it will become a charter affiliate of Fox in 1986 and switch to CBS in 1994 as a result of the 1994-1996 United States broadcast television realignment.
May 25	CBS airs the fourth game of the Major Indoor Soccer League's championship series between the San Diego Sockers and the Baltimore Blast. This would be the final year the MISL would have games aired on network television. CBS used Gary Bender and Kyle Rote Jr. on commentary.
May 30	The USA Network airs its final National Hockey League telecast, game five of the Stanley Cup Final. NHL contests wouldn't be seen in any shape or form on USA again until the 2015 Stanley Cup playoffs.
June 14	ABC broadcasts its 2,311th and last daytime episode of Family Feud after 9 years. Richard Dawson gives an emotional speech at the end of the broadcast. Dawson would return to the series during 1994 for one more season. Meanwhile, on CBS, Press Your Luck broadcasts the episode in which all three contestants would be invited back after a mistake on a question about the cartoon character Sylvester was corrected by Mel Blanc telephoning Peter Tomarken at the end of the show.
June 24	Kathie Lee Johnson (later Gifford) officially joins Regis Philbin as his co-host on WABC's The Morning Show. Their chemistry proves to be successful as The Morning Show soon becomes number 1 in the market and goes on to debut in national syndication on September 5, 1988, when the title is changed to Live with Regis and Kathie Lee.
July 1	Nick at Nite, a nighttime program service with an emphasis on classic television reruns, is launched in the United States, being broadcast on the same channel as Nickelodeon. At the same time, A&E, which previously shared Nickelodeon's channel, begins broadcasting as its own 24-hour cable channel in January of that year on a separate satellite transponder.
July 2	The final episode of The Jeffersons airs on CBS. It is not without controversy though, as CBS abruptly canceled the series without allowing for a proper series finale. The cast was not informed until after the July 2, 1985, episode, "Red Robins"; actor Sherman Hemsley, who portrayed George Jefferson, said he learned that the show was canceled by reading it in the newspaper. Isabel Sanford (Louise Jefferson), who heard about the cancellation through her cousin who read it in the tabloids, publicly stated that she found the cancellation with no proper finale to be disrespectful on the network's part. Per an article in the May 8, 1985, Los Angeles Times, the series was cancelled by announcement at the CBS network "upfront" presentation the day before, nearly two months before the airing of the final episode. Actor Franklin Cover, who played Tom Willis, also heard about the cancellation while watching Entertainment Tonight.
July 4	NBC's Minneapolis/St. Paul (Twin Cities) affiliate WTCN-TV changes its name to WUSA to reflect its co-ownership with USA Today. This would be displaced a year after by KARE.
July 13	The Live Aid concerts are broadcast from London and Philadelphia. In the U.S., the concerts are broadcast by MTV and over-the-air syndication, with ABC joining in a 3-hour prime-time period.
July 16	NBC's telecast of the Major League Baseball All-Star Game out of the Metrodome in Minnesota is the first program to be broadcast in stereo by a television network.
July 16	Rock Hudson joined his old friend Doris Day for a Hollywood press conference announcing the launch of her new TV cable show Doris Day's Best Friends in which Hudson was videotaped visiting Day's ranch in Carmel, California, a few days earlier. He appeared gaunt and his speech was nearly incoherent; during the segment, Hudson did very little speaking, with most of it consisting of Day and Hudson walking around as Day's recording of "My Buddy" played in the background, with Hudson noting he had quickly tired out. His appearance was enough of a shock that the reunion was broadcast repeatedly over national news shows that night and for days to come.
July 22	Douglas Marland starts his critically acclaimed eight-year run writing for the CBS soap opera As the World Turns.
August 4	Capital Cities Communications continues its acquisition of ABC when its CBS affiliate in Durham, North Carolina, WTVD, swaps affiliations with ABC affiliate WRAL-TV in Raleigh.
August 19	A taping of an outdoor interview for NBC's Today is interrupted by David Letterman, who, while taping his own Late Night, leans out of an office window and announces, "My name is Larry Grossman (then-president of NBC News) and I'm not wearing any pants!"
August 24	SIN broadcasts the final of the 8th National OTI-SIN Festival live from the James L. Knight Center in Miami.
September 2	NBC becomes the first broadcast network in the U.S. to broadcast its prime time programs with stereo sound.
September 5	Showtime begins airing weekly 10 p.m. showings of 52 hours worth of "lost" episodes of The Honeymooners.
September 8	Capital Cities Communications continues its acquisition of ABC when KFSN-TV, its CBS affiliate in Fresno, California, swaps affiliations with the market's existing ABC affiliate, KJEO.
September 9	ABC affiliate WSAV-TV swaps affiliations with NBC affiliate WJCL, thus reversing a swap that took place in 1982.
September 9	The Price Is Right returns to daily syndication after a five-year hiatus, but with Tom Kennedy hosting. After 170 episodes produced, the show went on hiatus until 1994. Besides Johnny Olson, Gene Wood and Rod Roddy shared announcing duties.
September 14	The Golden Girls and 227 make their debuts on NBC. Also, on that network, The Facts of Life enters its seventh season with a special three-arc episode, as Edna's Edibles, which had been the main setting of the show for its previous two years, is burned to the ground, leading into its rebuilding, replacing it with an ice cream and gift shop named Over Our Heads.
September 15	Whitney Houston makes a guest appearance on the fourth-season premiere of Silver Spoons on NBC.
September 16	After a 22-year hiatus, new episodes of The Jetsons debut. The syndicated revival would run for two seasons.
September 16	Cleveland's CBS affiliate WJKW-TV changes its name back to WJW-TV.
September 18	"Top Ten Things That Almost Rhyme With Peas" is the subject of the first "Top 10 List" on NBC's Late Night with David Letterman.
September 22	The first Farm Aid concert is telecast from Champaign, Illinois, in syndication and by TNN.
September 23	Jackie Gleason and Art Carney reunite in the CBS movie Izzy and Moe.
September 23	On NBC, the television movie Family Ties Vacation was broadcast, three days before Family Ties' fourth-season premiere, where the Keatons take a vacation to England. The movie was later split into four individual episodes when the series entered syndication.
September 24	Growing Pains debuts on ABC.
September 26	Woody Harrelson makes his debut appearance as Woody Boyd in the fourth-season premiere of Cheers on NBC.
September 27	The pilot episode for a revival of the anthology television series, The Twilight Zone airs on CBS. This particular iteration of The Twilight Zone would run for three seasons, the first two on CBS and the final one in syndication.
September 27	Diff'rent Strokes premiered its one-hour eighth-season premiere on ABC, after seven seasons on NBC.
September 28	ABC broadcasts an episode of The Super Powers Team: Galactic Guardians called "The Fear", in which Batman's origin is depicted for the first time in media outside of the comic books.
September 28	Three years after being canceled by ABC following its second season, the sitcom It's a Living is relaunched for the first-run syndication market. It would continue for four more seasons before its conclusion in 1989.
September 29	MacGyver debuts on ABC.
September 29	Howard Cosell makes what turns out to be his final assignment for ABC Sports, a Major League Baseball game between the Kansas City Royals and Minnesota Twins from the Metrodome in Minneapolis. Cosell is later removed from his scheduled announcing duties for that year's World Series due to the controversy surrounding his book I Never Played the Game. Cosell is replaced on the ABC broadcasts by Tim McCarver, who would work the 1985 World Series alongside Al Michaels and Jim Palmer.
October 4	The PBS program Electric Company concludes after 8 straight years in reruns.
October 4	NBC officially wins the rights to broadcast the 1988 Summer Olympics from Seoul, South Korea.
October 6	Jem and the Holograms debuts as one of four six-minute matinée segments on Super Sunday. [It becomes a regular half-hour program in 1986].
October 6	Spectrum is discontinued.
October 9	Actor and filmmaker Orson Welles records what would become his final interview on the syndicated TV program The Merv Griffin Show, appearing with biographer Barbara Leaming. Welles would die from a heart attack the following morning.
October 20	The I Dream of Jeannie reunion movie, I Dream of Jeannie... Fifteen Years Later is broadcast on NBC. It's the first of two reunion movies, as the next one, would be broadcast six years later.
November 5	CBS broadcasts the made-for-television drama film Stone Pillow. It stars Lucille Ball, in an attempt to make a dramatic "breakout" from her years in comedy, as an older homeless woman with few resources and even fewer options. The film received rather mixed reviews, but was a ratings success. The telecast ranked 9th out of 68 programs airing that week, and brought in a 23.3 rating and a 33 share. The success of the film led Ball to make one last attempt to return to her comedy roots with Life with Lucy the next year.
November 6	KRRT-TV goes on the air, giving the San Antonio market its first independent station.
November 8	The final episode of The Price Is Right with Johnny Olson as announcer is broadcast by CBS. Olson had died on October 12; the show was broadcast as an "in memoriam" tribute to him on October 29.
November 9	On NBC, Saturday Night Live begins its 11th season, with Lorne Michaels returning as executive producer and an all-new cast that includes Jon Lovitz and Dennis Miller.
November 17	Kane & Abel, a miniseries based on the bestselling Jeffrey Archer novel, debuts on CBS.
November 18	Elmo, a new character for Sesame Street, is introduced on PBS. In the same episode, the adult cast of Sesame Street come face-to-face with Aloysius Snuffleupagus for the first time since the character's 1971 introduction.
November 20	The Colbys debuts on ABC as a spin-off of Dynasty, which revolves around the Colbys, another vastly wealthy family who own a large multinational conglomerate and are connected to the Carringtons of Dynasty, starring John James and Emma Samms, reprising their roles as Jeff Colby and Fallon Carrington, respectively.
November 28	Jim Crockett Promotions and the National Wrestling Alliance hold the third annual Starrcade event. Transmitted via closed-circuit television, this particular event took place from the Greensboro Coliseum Complex in Greensboro, North Carolina and Omni Coliseum in Atlanta, Georgia, with the event going back and forth from both arenas.
December 3	Copacabana, an original musical featuring Barry Manilow (based on his 1978 song of the same name), Annette O'Toole, and Estelle Getty, is broadcast by CBS.
December 3	Courteney Cox uses the word "period" (referring to menstruation) on U.S. television for the first time, in a commercial for Tampax brand tampons.
December 5	A Wheel of Fortune contestant Terry Wharton missolves a puzzle "The Thrill of Victory and the Agony of Defeat" (a quote from Jim McKay), leaving $62,400 cash unclaimed. This was to date, the largest cash unclaimed for a round in the history of the show, which, at the time, would have set then the biggest winnings record during the maingame alone.
December 12	General Electric announces plans to purchase RCA, owner of NBC for $6.3 billion, and eventually wants to convert General Electric's TV station KCNC into an NBC owned and operated station. The deal would be finalized on June 9, 1986.
December 30	ABC affiliate KOMU-TV in Columbia, Missouri, owned by the University of Missouri, swaps affiliations with NBC affiliate KCBJ-TV, reversing a swap that took place in 1982. KCBJ-TV subsequently changes its call letters to KMIZ to reflect the change.
December 30	In Waco, ABC affiliate KCEN swaps affiliations with NBC affiliate KXXV.

== Programs ==
=== Debuting this year ===
Date	Title	Network
January 4	Street Hawk	ABC
January 5	Berrenger's	NBC
January 7	Time Machine	NBC
January 20	MacGruder and Loud	ABC
January 23	Sara	NBC
January 23	ThunderCats	Syndication
January 26	Otherworld	CBS
January 27	Code Name: Foxfire	NBC
March 1	Michael Nesmith in Television Parts	NBC
March 3	Moonlighting	ABC
March 4	Robotech	Syndication
March 15	Mr. Belvedere	ABC
March 15	Off the Rack	ABC
March 18	Safe at Home	WTBS
March 21	Eye to Eye	ABC
March 21	Wildside	ABC
March 24	Half Nelson	NBC
March 30	CBS Storybreak	CBS
April 5	Me and Mom	ABC
April 7	National Geographic Explorer	Nickelodeon
April 9	Hail to the Chief	ABC
April 10	Double Dare	CBS
April 15	Lady Blue	ABC
April 19	The Best Times	NBC
May 1	Strangers and Brothers	PBS
May 6	Dumbo's Circus	The Disney Channel
May 11	Saturday Night's Main Event	NBC
June 3	Larry King Live	CNN
June 3	Turkey Television	Nickelodeon
June 30	Code of Vengeance	NBC
July 4	The Raccoons	The Disney Channel
July 14	Stingray	NBC
August 13	West 57th	CBS
August 22	Hometown	CBS
September 2	Attitudes	Lifetime
September 2	Rocky Road	WTBS
September 4	Hell Town	NBC
September 7	The 13 Ghosts of Scooby-Doo	ABC
September 7	Star Wars: Droids	ABC
September 7	Ewoks	ABC
September 7	Small Wonder	Syndication
September 7	What's Happening Now!!	Syndication
September 14	227	NBC
September 14	Adventures of the Gummi Bears	NBC
September 14	The Golden Girls	NBC
September 14	It's Punky Brewster	NBC
September 14	The Berenstain Bears	CBS
September 14	Hulk Hogan's Rock 'n' Wrestling	CBS
September 14	Jim Henson's Little Muppet Monsters	CBS
September 14	The Wuzzles	CBS
September 14	The Care Bears	Syndication
September 16	America	Syndication
September 16	Break the Bank	Syndication
September 16	G.I. Joe: A Real American Hero	Syndication
September 16	Jayce and the Wheeled Warriors	Syndication
September 18	Charlie & Co.	CBS
September 18	The Equalizer	CBS
September 18	George Burns Comedy Week	CBS
September 18	Stir Crazy	CBS
September 20	Spenser: For Hire	ABC
September 21	Hollywood Beat	ABC
September 21	Lime Street	ABC
September 24	Growing Pains	ABC
September 25	The Insiders	ABC
September 29	MacGyver	ABC
September 29	Amazing Stories	NBC
September 30	M.A.S.K.	Syndication
October 4	Misfits of Science	NBC
October 6	Jem	Syndication
October 20	Andy Warhol's Fifteen Minutes	MTV
November 20	The Colbys	ABC
November 21	Shadow Chasers	ABC
December 11	Foley Square	CBS
December 11	Mary	CBS

=== Resuming this year ===
Title	Final aired	Previous network	New title	Returning network	Date of return
The Charlie Brown and Snoopy Show	1983	CBS	Same	Same	September 14
The Jetsons	1963	ABC	Same	WTBS	September 16
The Twilight Zone	1964	CBS	Same	Same	September 27
Making a Living	1982	ABC	It's a Living	Syndication	September 28
Alfred Hitchcock Presents	1965	NBC	Same	Same	September 29

=== Ending this year ===
Date	Title	Debut
January 21	Insight	1960
February 1	Call to Glory	1984
February 8	The Dukes of Hazzard	1979
February 23	It's Your Move	1984
February 26	Pink Panther and Sons	1984
February 27	E/R	1984
March 19	Alice	1976
March 22	V	1984
April 3	Charles in Charge (returned in 1987)	1984
April 9	Three's a Crowd	1984
April 13	Finder of Lost Loves	1984
April 19	Off the Rack	1985
May 1	Out of Control	1984
May 8	Sara	1985
May 16	Street Hawk	1985
May 22	Double Dare	1985
June 14	Family Feud (returned in 1988)	1976
June 25	The Jeffersons	1975
June 28	Robotech	1985
July 6	Cover Up	1984
July 19	Matt Houston	1982
July 20	Hail to the Chief	1985
August 1	Battle of the Planets	1978
August 10	Fat Albert and the Cosby Kids	1972
September 28	Little Muppet Monsters	1985
October 12	The Charlie Brown and Snoopy Show	1983
October 26	Lime Street	1985
November 2	The Littles	1983
November 9	Super Friends	1973
November 16	Snorks (returned in 1987)	1984
November 18	Voltron	1984
November 21	He-Man and the Masters of the Universe	1983
November 23	Hollywood Beat	1985
December 7	The 13 Ghosts of Scooby-Doo	1985
December 7	The Wuzzles	1985
December 7	Dungeons & Dragons	1983
December 27	Glitter	1984

=== Changing networks ===
Show	Moved from	Moved to
Diff'rent Strokes	NBC	ABC
The Bugs Bunny Show	CBS	ABC
The Jetsons	ABC	Syndication
It's a Living	ABC	Syndication
T.J. Hooker	ABC	CBS

=== Made-for-TV movies and miniseries ===
Title	Network	Date of airing
Poison Ivy	NBC	February 10
Space	CBS	April 14–18
The Long Hot Summer	NBC	October 6–7
The Midnight Hour	ABC	November 1
North and South	ABC	November 3–10
Stone Pillow	CBS	November 5
An Early Frost	NBC	November 11
Kane and Abel	CBS	November 17–18
Perry Mason Returns	NBC	December 1
Alice in Wonderland	CBS	December 9–10

== Networks and services ==
=== Launches ===
Network	Type	Launch date	Notes	Source
Tele Vida Abundante	Cable television	Unknown		
Video Jukebox Network	Cable television	Unknown		
VH1	Cable television	January 1		
The Nostalgia Channel	Cable television	February 1		
The Discovery Channel	Cable television	June 17		
CNN International	Cable television	September 1		
Prime Ticket	Cable television	October 19		
Universal Pictures Debut Network	Cable television	Unknown		

=== Conversions and rebrandings ===
Old network name	New network name	Type	Conversion Date	Notes	Source
Home Shopping Club	Home Shopping Network	Cable television	July 1		

=== Closures ===
There are no closures for television channels in this year.

== Television stations ==
=== Station launches ===
Date	City of License/Market	Station	Channel	Affiliation	Notes/Ref.
January 5	Tucson, Arizona	KPOL	40	Independent	
January 22	Colorado Springs, Colorado	KXRM	21	Independent	
January 28	Twin Falls, Idaho	K27AO	27	ABC (as a KIVI-TV translator)	Now ABC affiliate KSAW-LD, a semi-satellite of KIVI-TV/Nampa, Idaho
January 29	Columbus, Ohio	W62BE	62	Independent	
February 12	Boston, Massachusetts	WVJV-TV	66	Independent (music videos)	
March 4	Fayetteville/Raleigh/Durham, North Carolina	WFCT	62	Independent	Now Court TV O&O WFPX-TV, licensed to Archer Lodge, North Carolina
March 9	Quincy, Illinois	WQEC	27	PBS	
March 22	Waco, Texas	KXXV	25	NBC	
March 26	Saginaw/Flint, Michigan	WAQP	49	TBN	
March 28	Augusta, Georgia	W67BE	67	Independent	Now WAGT-CD channel 26
March 31	Bismarck, North Dakota	KBMY	17	ABC	
April 10	Jackson, Tennessee	WJKT	16	Independent	
April 11	Shreveport, Louisiana	KMSS-TV	33	Independent	
April 15	Eugene, Oregon	K25AS	25	Independent	
April 28	Riverhead/New York City, New York	WLIG	55	Independent	
May 14	Wichita Falls, Texas	KJTL	18	Independent	
May 19	Shaker Heights/Cleveland, Ohio	WOIO	19	Independent	
June	Minot, North Dakota	KMCY	14	ABC	
June 3	Hazleton, Pennsylvania (Scranton/Wilkes-Barre, Pennsylvania)	WWLF-TV	56	Independent	
June 3	Scranton/Wilkes-Barre, Pennsylvania	WOLF-TV	38	Independent	
June 3	Tulsa, Oklahoma	KTCT	47	Religious independent	
June 25	Seattle, Washington	KTZZ-TV	22	Independent	
July 17	Sanger, California (Fresno/Visalia, California)	KMSG-TV	59	Independent	
July 19	Vineyard Haven/Boston, Massachusetts	WCVX	32	Independent	
July 23	Grand Rapids, Michigan	W26AD	26	World Harvest Television	
July 28	Davenport, Iowa (Bettendorf, Iowa and Rock Island/Moline, Illinois)	KLJB-TV	18	Independent	
August 17	Los Angeles, California	KTIE	63	Independent	
August 24	Wichita, Kansas	KSAS-TV	24	Independent	
September	Thief River Falls, Minnesota (Grand Forks, North Dakota)	KBRR	10	Independent	Satellite of KVRR/Fargo, North Dakota
September 5	Murfreesboro, Tennessee	W11BF	11	Independent	Audio-only simulcast of WGNS radio in Murfreesboro
September 7	Charleston, South Carolina	WTAT-TV	23	Independent	
September 24	Chico/Redding, California	KNVN	24	NBC	
October	Harrisonburg, Virginia	W10AZ	10	Religious independent	
October	Washington, D.C.	W10AZ	10	Religious independent	
October 7	Salt Lake City, Utah	KOOG-TV	30	Independent	
October 14	Cape Coral/Fort Myers, Florida	WFTX-TV	36	Independent	
October 27	Caguas, Puerto Rico	WUJA	58	Independent	
October 30	Lexington, North Carolina (Greensboro/Winston-Salem/High Point, NC)	WEJC	20	Religious independent	
November	Milwaukee, Wisconsin	W08BY	8	MuchMusic USA	
November	Muskegon/Grand Rapids, Michigan	WTLJ	54	Christian independent	
November 2	Altoona, Pennsylvania (Johnstown/State College, Pennsylvania)	WKBS-TV	47	Cornerstone Television	Satellite of WPCB-TV/Greensburg-Pittsburgh
November 3	Greeneville, Tennessee; Tri-Cities, Tennessee/Virginia)	WEMT	39	Independent	
November 6	KRRT	35		Independent	
November 12	Newark, Arkansas	KLEP	17	Educational independent	
November 16	Natchez, Mississippi	WNTZ-TV	33	Independent	
December	Mobile, Alabama (Pensacola, Florida)	WMPV-TV	21	Independent	
December 1	Cleveland, Ohio	WBNX-TV	55	Independent	
December 15	Kingston, New York/Albany, New York	WTZA	48	Independent	Now WRNN-TV, licensed to New Rochelle, New York
December 23	Phoenix, Arizona	KUTP	45	Independent	
December 24	Baltimore, Maryland	WKJL-TV	24	Independent	
December 30	Orlando, Florida	WAYK	56	Independent	
Unknown date	Fajardo/San Juan, Puerto Rico	WMTJ	40	PBS	
Unknown date	Huntsville, Alabama	WZDX-TV	54	Independent	
Unknown date	Montgomery, Alabama	WMCF-TV	45	Independent	

=== Network affiliation changes ===
Date	City of License/Market	Station	Channel	Old affiliation	New affiliation	Notes/Ref.
August 4	Raleigh-Durham-Fayetteville, North Carolina	WRAL	5	ABC	CBS	ABC acquires Capital Cities Communications, and the purchase was finalized on January 3, 1986, making the station an ABC owned-and-operated station.
August 4	Raleigh-Durham-Fayetteville, North Carolina	WTVD	11	CBS	ABC (O&O)	ABC acquires Capital Cities Communications, and the purchase was finalized on January 3, 1986, making the station an ABC owned-and-operated station.
September 9	Fresno, California	KFSN-TV	30	CBS	ABC (O&O)	KFSN-TV was purchased by Capital Cities Communications, the then-parent of ABC. The purchase was finalized on January 3, 1986, making the station an ABC owned-and-operated station.
September 9	Fresno, California	KGPE	47	ABC	CBS	KFSN-TV was purchased by Capital Cities Communications, the then-parent of ABC. The purchase was finalized on January 3, 1986, making the station an ABC owned-and-operated station.
September 9	Savannah, Georgia	WSAV	3	ABC	NBC	The swap was given, because of WSAV's weak performance of ABC's network programming, especially Thursday nights, which had bogged down its stronger syndicated slate.
September 9	Savannah, Georgia	WJCL	22	NBC	ABC	The swap was given, because of WSAV's weak performance of ABC's network programming, especially Thursday nights, which had bogged down its stronger syndicated slate.
December 29	Waco, Texas	KCEN	6	ABC	NBC	
December 29	Waco, Texas	KXXV	25	NBC	ABC	

=== Station closures ===
Date	City of license/Market	Station	Channel	Affiliation	Sign-on date	Notes
January	Angola, Indiana	WBKZ	63		April 22, 1983	

== Births ==
Date	Name	Notability
January 3	Jeananne Goossen	Canadian actress (The Night Shift)
January 3	Nicole Beharie	Actress
January 3	Leah Gibson	Actress
January 7	Lauren Glazier	Canadian actress
January 10	Alex Meraz	Actor
January 11	Aja Naomi King	Actress (How to Get Away with Murder)
January 12	Cynthia Addai-Robinson	Actress (Spartacus, Arrow)
January 13	Ellen Wong	Actress
January 16	Renée Felice Smith	Actress (NCIS: Los Angeles)
January 18	Matt Hobby	Actor, comedian (Young Sheldon, Boardwalk Empire)
January 25	Hartley Sawyer	Actor (Glory Daze)
January 25	Michael Trevino	Actor (The Vampire Diaries)
January 26	Edwin Hodge	Actor
January 29	Isabel Lucas	Australian actress (Home and Away, Emerald City)
January 31	Tyler Ritter	Actor
February 4	Bug Hall	Actor
February 6	Crystal Reed	Actress (Teen Wolf)
February 7	Deborah Ann Woll	Actress (True Blood, Daredevil)
February 7	Tina Majorino	Actress (Camp Wilder, Veronica Mars, Big Love, The Deep End, Grey's Anatomy, Legends) and singer
February 9	Rachel Melvin	Actress (Days of Our Lives)
February 9	David Gallagher	Actor (7th Heaven, Rocket Power)
February 14	Jake Lacy	Actor (Better With You, The Office)
February 14	Victoria Cartagena	Actress
February 15	Natalie Morales	Actress
February 18	Chelsea Hobbs	Canadian actress (Make It or Break It)
February 18	Jessica Grace Smith	Actress
February 19	Arielle Kebbel	Actress (Life Unexpected, 90210, Ballers)
February 19	Haylie Duff	Actress (Lizzie McGuire, 7th Heaven) and singer
February 22	Zach Roerig	Actor (As the World Turns, One Life to Live, The Vampire Diaries)
February 27	Heléne Yorke	Actress
March 2	Robert Iler	Former actor
March 4	Scott Michael Foster	Actor (Greek)
March 4	Whitney Port	Actress (The Hills, The City)
March 7	Guy Benson	American columnist
March 10	Cooper Andrews	Actor
March 13	Alfonso Dosal	Actor
March 15	Eva Amurri	Actress (Undateable) and daughter of Susan Sarandon
March 15	James Maclurcan	Australian actor (Power Rangers Operation Overdrive)
March 15	Kellan Lutz	Actor
March 18	Duane Henry	English actor (NCIS)
March 21	Sonequa Martin-Green	Actress
March 22	James Wolk	Actor
March 22	Lizzie Brocheré	Actress
March 23	Stephen A. Chang	Actor (Artificial, Victorious, NCIS: Los Angeles)
March 24	Lana	Actress and wrestler
March 24	Jeremy James Kissner	Actor (Flight 29 Down)
March 25	Chris Redd	Actor and comedian (Saturday Night Live)
March 26	Jonathan Groff	Actor and singer (Glee)
March 26	Keira Knightley	English actress and singer (Pirates of the Caribbean)
March 26	Francesca Marie Smith	Actress (The Secret World of Alex Mack, Hey Arnold!, Recess)
March 27	Blake McIver Ewing	Actor (Full House, Recess, Hey Arnold!, Lloyd in Space)
March 28	Zachary Browne	Actor
March 31	Jessica Szohr	Actress (Gossip Girl)
April 16	Nate Diaz	Mixed martial artist
April 17	Rooney Mara	Actress
April 17	Luke Mitchell	Australian actor (H_{2}O: Just Add Water, Home and Away, Agents of S.H.I.E.L.D.)
April 18	Rachel Smith	Actress
April 18	Jessica Lu	Actress
April 19	Sabrina Jalees	Canadian comedian
April 21	Rachel Lindsay	Television personality
April 22	Kristin Fairlie	Canadian actress (Total Drama, Stoked, Peg + Cat)
April 24	Courtnee Draper	Actress (The Jersey)
April 26	Jemima Kirke	English actress (Girls)
April 26	Falk Hentschel	German actor (Legends of Tomorrow)
April 28	Brandon Baker	Actor (One World, Even Stevens)
April 29	Punkie Johnson	Actress
May 2	Lily Allen	Actress
May 3	Louis Cato	Bandleader
May 5	Clark Duke	Actor (Hearts Afire, Greek)
May 6	KJ Smith	Actress
May 9	Chris Zylka	Actor (The Secret Circle) and model
May 9	Audrina Patridge	Actress (The Hills, Audrina, Dream Maker)
May 10	Odette Annable	Actress (October Road, House, The Astronaut Wives Club, Supergirl)
May 11	Jadyn Wong	Canadian actress (Scorpion)
May 13	Iwan Rheon	Welsh actor (Game of Thrones)
May 14	Sally Martin	New Zealand actress (Power Rangers Ninja Storm)
May 16	Julia Voth	Canadian actress (Package Deal)
May 17	Jonathan McDaniel	Actor (That's So Raven, Raven's Home) and rapper
May 17	Derek Hough	Actor
May 24	Kasie Hunt	American political correspondent
May 25	Lauren Frost	Actress (Even Stevens) and singer
May 25	Roman Reigns	Pro wrestler
May 27	Andrew Francis	Canadian voice actor (Johnny Test, Hero: 108, My Little Pony: Friendship Is Magic)
May 28	Carey Mulligan	British actress
May 28	Emily Wilson	American actress
May 29	Blake Foster	Actor (Power Rangers Turbo) and martial artist
June 6	Abbie Cobb	Actress (Suburgatory)
June 8	Rosanna Pansino	YouTube personality (Nerdy Nummies) and actress
June 10	Kristina Apgar	Actress (Privileged)
June 10	Celina Jade	Chinese-American actress (Arrow)
June 12	Kendra Wilkinson	Model
June 17	Antoinette Picatto	Actress (Cover Me)
June 18	Alex Hirsch	Voice actor (Fish Hooks, Gravity Falls)
June 18	Sorel Carradine	Actress
June 20	Mark Saul	Actor (All That)
June 21	Kris Allen	Singer (American Idol)
June 21	Michelle Wolf	Actress
June 22	Douglas Smith	Actor
June 24	Justin Hires	Actor
June 25	Annaleigh Ashford	Actress (Masters of Sex) and singer
June 26	Ana Ularu	Romanian-American actress (One Step Ahead, Emerald City)
June 26	Colt Knost	Golfer
June 30	Cody Rhodes	Pro wrestler (AEW, Arrow, Go-Big Show, WAGS Atlanta, WWE)
July 1	Léa Seydoux	French actress
July 2	Ashley Tisdale	Actress (The Amanda Show, The Hughleys, The Suite Life of Zack & Cody, High School Musical, Hellcats, Young & Hungry), voice actress (Kim Possible, Phineas and Ferb, Skylanders Academy) and singer
July 2	Nelson Franklin	Actor
July 2	Dave McCary	Actor
July 5	François Arnaud	Actor
July 7	Helen Hong	Actress
July 11	Robert Adamson	Actor
July 16	Rosa Salazar	Actress
July 17	Caitlin Van Zandt	Actress (Guiding Light, The Sopranos)
July 18	Chace Crawford	Actor (Gossip Girl)
July 18	James Norton	Actor
July 18	Hopsin	Rapper
July 20	John Francis Daley	Actor (Freaks and Geeks, Bones)
July 21	Vanessa Lengies	Actress (American Dreams, Hawthorne, Second Chance)
July 25	Shantel VanSanten	Actress (One Tree Hill, Gang Related, The Messengers, Shooter)
July 25	James Lafferty	Actor (One Tree Hill, Crisis)
July 27	Aljin Abella	Australian actor (Power Rangers Jungle Fury)
July 27	Lou Taylor Pucci	Actor
July 28	Dustin Milligan	Canadian actor (Runaway, 90210, Schitt's Creek, X Company, Dirk Gently's Holistic Detective Agency)
August 2	Britt Lower	American actress
August 3	Georgina Haig	Australian actress (The Elephant Princess, Reckless, Once Upon a Time)
August 3	Max Landis	American writer and filmmaker
August 4	Crystal Bowersox	Singer (American Idol)
August 5	David Hull	Actor
August 5	Zach Appelman	Actor
August 7	Nick Rutherford	Actor
August 9	Anna Kendrick	Actress
August 10	Jared Nathan	Child actor (ZOOM) (d. 2006)
August 13	Honey Davenport	Actor
August 15	Emily Kinney	Actress (The Walking Dead, Conviction) and singer
August 16	Agnes Bruckner	Actress (The Bold and the Beautiful, The Returned)
August 16	Arden Cho	Actress (Teen Wolf)
August 16	Cristin Milioti	Actress (How I Met Your Mother)
August 20	Miguel Gomez	Actor
August 21	Laura Haddock	Actress (Da Vinci's Demons)
August 22	The Usos	Pro wrestling duo (WWE)
August 27	Kayla Ewell	Actress (The Bold and the Beautiful, The Vampire Diaries)
August 29	Jeffrey Licon	Actor (Second Noah, The Brothers García)
August 30	Bert Selen	Composer
September 1	Lilan Bowden	Actress (Andi Mack)
September 2	Allison Miller	American actress (Kings, Terra Nova, Go On, Incorporated, 13 Reasons Why, A Million Little Things)
September 3	Brian Stelter	American television anchor
September 6	Lauren Lapkus	American television actress
September 7	Alyssa Diaz	Actress (The Nine Lives of Chloe King, Army Wives, Ray Donovan, Zoo)
September 8	Vanessa Baden	Actress (Gullah Gullah Island, Kenan & Kel)
September 8	Mina Kimes	American journalist
September 10	Elyse Levesque	Actress (Stargate Universe)
September 10	Monica Lopera	Actress
September 13	Vella Lovell	Actress
September 14	Dilshad Vadsaria	Actress (Greek, Second Chance)
September 16	Madeline Zima	Actress (The Nanny, Californication)
September 17	Jack Fox	Actor
September 19	Zoë Chao	Actress
September 22	Tatiana Maslany	Canadian actress (Heartland, Orphan Black)
September 24	Jessica Lucas	Canadian actress (Edgemont, Life as We Know It, Melrose Place, Cult, Gotham) and singer
September 26	Talulah Riley	English actress
September 27	Grace Helbig	Actress and YouTube personality
September 30	Katrina Law	Actress
September 30	Ben Lewis	Actor
October 1	Sicily Sewell	Actress (One on One)
October 5	Emily Heller	Actress
October 8	Bruno Mars	Singer (Saturday Night Live)
October 10	Aaron Himelstein	Actor
October 11	Michelle Trachtenberg	Actress (All My Children, The Adventures of Pete & Pete, Buffy the Vampire Slayer, Truth or Scare, Mercy, Gossip Girl) and singer (d. 2025)
October 14	Daniel Clark	Actor (Degrassi: The Next Generation)
October 14	Robert Costa	Journalist
October 15	Dominic Sandoval	Dancer
October 20	Jennifer Freeman	Actress (My Wife and Kids)
October 22	Zac Hanson	Singer (Hanson)
October 23	Priscilla Faia	Canadian actress (Rookie Blue)
October 23	Masiela Lusha	European-born American actress (George Lopez)
October 25	Gillian Zinser	Actress (90210)
October 25	Christopher Sean	Actor
October 28	Troian Bellisario	Actress (Lauren, Pretty Little Liars) and daughter of Donald P. Bellisario
October 28	Jack Donnelly	Actor
October 29	Janet Montgomery	English actress (Human Target, Entourage, Made in Jersey, Salem)
October 29	Gio Benitez	American broadcast journalist
October 31	Kaitlin Ferrell	Actress
October 31	Kether Donohue	Actress (Kappa Mikey, You're the Worst)
November 2	Josh Grelle	Voice actor
November 3	Danièle Watts	Actress
November 4	Olivia Taylor Dudley	Actress (The Magicians)
November 5	Elizabeth Rice	Actress (Mad Men)
November 5	Annet Mahendru	Actress
November 7	Lucas Neff	Actor (Raising Hope)
November 12	Arianny Celeste	Model
November 13	Giovonnie Samuels	Actress (All That, Fatherwood, The Suite Life of Zack & Cody)
November 15	Nick Fradiani	Singer (America's Got Talent, American Idol)
November 18	Christian Siriano	Fashion designer
November 20	Dan Byrd	Actor (Clubhouse, Aliens in America, Cougar Town)
November 21	Carly Rae Jepsen	Actress
November 23	Katie Crown	Canadian voice actress (Total Drama, Jimmy Two-Shoes, Stoked, Clarence)
November 26	Arturo Castro	Actor
November 27	Alison Pill	Actress
November 30	Kaley Cuoco	Actress (8 Simple Rules, Charmed, The Big Bang Theory), voice actress (Brandy & Mr. Whiskers, Bratz, Loonatics Unleashed)
November 30	Gia Crovatin	Actress (Van Helsing, Billions, Hightown)
December 1	Janelle Monáe	Actress and singer
December 1	Evan Susser	Writer
December 3	Amanda Seyfried	Actress (As the World Turns, Big Love) and singer
December 5	Frankie Muniz	Actor (Malcolm in the Middle, The Fairly OddParents, Moville Mysteries)
December 7	Jon Moxley	Pro wrestler
December 10	Raven-Symoné	Actress (The Cosby Show, Hangin' with Mr. Cooper, Kim Possible, That's So Raven, The Cheetah Girls, Raven's Home) and singer
December 11	Karla Souza	Mexican-American actress (How to Get Away with Murder)
December 11	Samantha Ponder	Sportscaster
December 16	Amanda Setton	American actress
December 25	Perdita Weeks	Welsh actress
December 25	Smith Cho	Actress
December 26	Beth Behrs	Actress (2 Broke Girls)
December 27	Jessica Harmon	Canadian actress (The 100)
December 28	Taryn Terrell	Actress and former ECW personality
December 28	Dan Amboyer	Actress
December 30	Anna Wood	Actress (Reckless)
December 31	Erich Bergen	Actor

== Deaths ==
Date	Name	Age	Notability
February 12	Nicholas Colasanto	61	Actor (Coach Ernie Pantusso on Cheers)
February 28	Charita Bauer	62	Soap opera actress (Bert Bauer on Guiding Light)
May 8	Dolph Sweet	64	Actor (Chief Carl Kanisky on Gimme a Break!)
May 13	Selma Diamond	64	Actress (Selma Hacker on Night Court)
August 2	Bob Holt	56	Voice actor (Dr. Seuss television special)
August 25	Samantha Smith	13	Activist, actress (Lime Street)
October 2	Rock Hudson	59	Actor (Commissioner Stuart McMillan on McMillan & Wife)
October 12	Johnny Olson	75	Game show announcer (The Price Is Right)
October 15	Ted Steele	68	Host (The Ted Steele Show)
November 1	Phil Silvers	74	Actor, comedian (Sgt. Bilko on You'll Never Get Rich)
November 29	Bill Scott	65	Voice actor (Bullwinkle J. Moose)
December 31	Ricky Nelson	45	Actor (The Adventures of Ozzie and Harriet), musician

== See also ==
- 1985 in the United States
- List of American films of 1985
