= Winnette McIntosh Ambrose =

Baker, two-time Food Network Champion, and restaurant owner

- Education: Johns Hopkins University; Massachusetts Institute of Technology
- Culinary career
- Cooking style: baking
- Current restaurants
- Souk; The Sweet Lobby
- Television show
- Cupcake Wars

Winnette McIntosh Ambrose is an engineer-turned-entrepreneur, and a two-time Food Network champion. She is the owner of the bakeries Souk and The Sweet Lobby in Washington DC.

== Personal life ==
She is originally from Trinidad and Tobago. She has a brother, Timothy, who graduated, like her, from MIT with a degree in chemical engineering. She is married to Ricardo Ambrose, a Trini, who she met during their first year at MIT.

== Education ==
Winnette entered Massachusetts Institute of Technology (MIT) at the age of 19 on a scholarship. While studying abroad at the Sorbonne in Paris as a sophomore at MIT, McIntosh Ambrose fell in love with French pastries, the macaron in particular. In 1998, she earned a double major in chemical engineering and in foreign languages and literature, specifically French. After graduating from MIT, McIntosh Ambrose worked for about five years in medical device design before returning to school to earn her Ph.D. in biomedical engineering at Johns Hopkins University in 2009, where she focused on biomaterials and stem cells.

== Bakery ==
Winnette and Timothy have won the $10,000 first-place prize on an episode of Cupcake Wars. At first, she ran the bakery business while working on medical devices at the National Institute of Health. But after winning Cupcake Wars, demand for the business increased and she decided to pursue the business full-time.

McIntosh Ambrose is the owner and manager of "Souk", a production facility and a globally inspired market and bakery in Washington, D.C.
