= Dream Maker (disambiguation) =

Dream Maker is an American webseries starring Audrina Patridge.

Dream Maker may also refer to:

- Dream Maker (album), a 1982 album by Conway Twitty
- The Dream Maker, an alternate name for the 1963 British musical film It's All Happening
- The Dream Makers, a 1975 American television film starring James Franciscus
- The Dream Makers (TV series), a Singaporean series
  - The Dream Makers II, a sequel series to the Singaporean show
- Dream Maker (TV program), a 2022 Philippine reality television show
- Dreamaker, a Spanish band
- Dream Maker Entertainment, a division of the South Korean entertainment company SM Entertainment
