= Audrina Patridge =

American reality television star

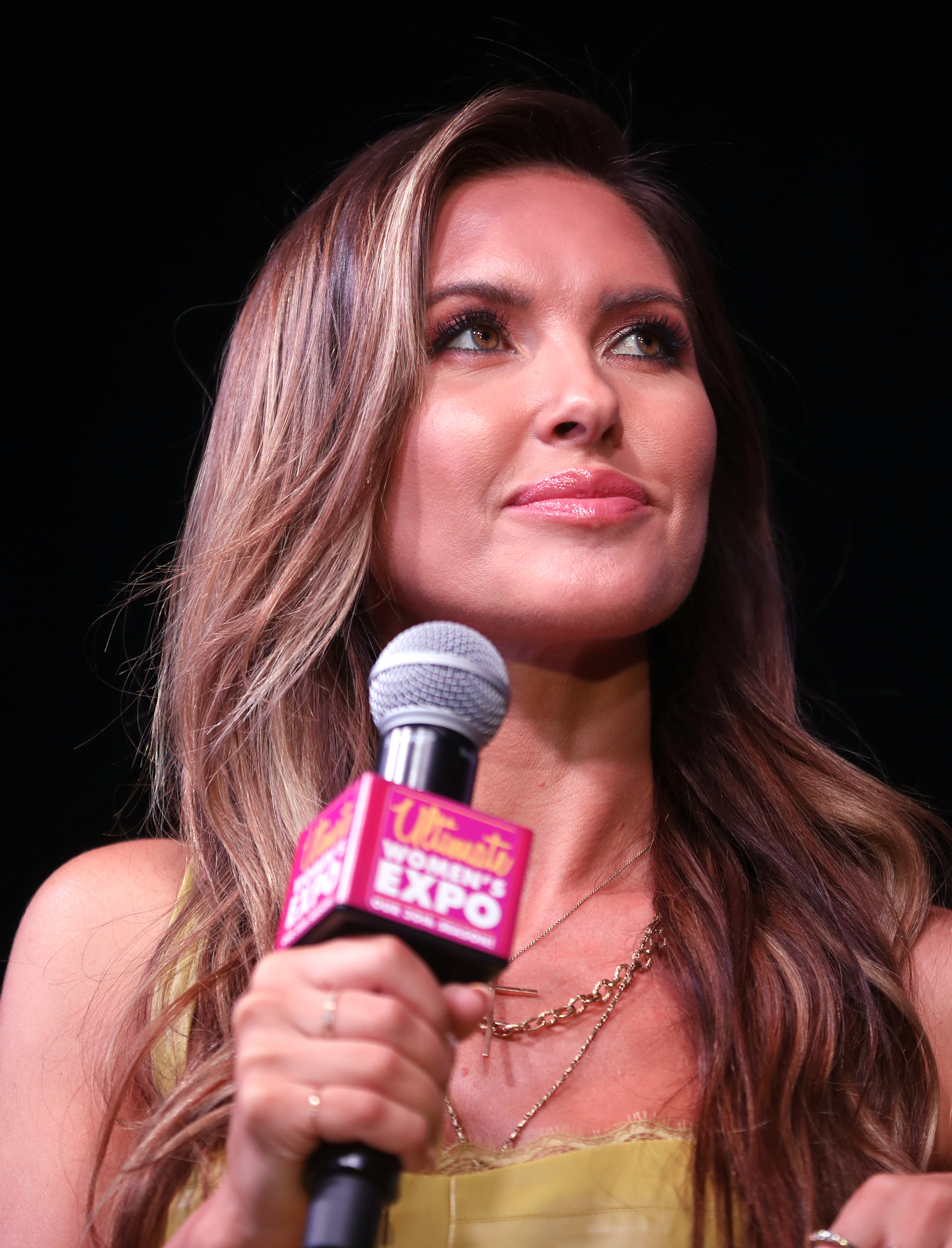
- Patridge in 2023
- Born: May 9, 1985 (age 41)
- Occupations: Television personality; model; actress
- Years active: 2005–present
- Television: The Hills; Dancing with the Stars; Audrina; 1st Look; The Hills: New Beginnings
- Spouse: Corey Bohan (m. 2016; div. 2018)
- Children: 1

Audrina Patridge (born May 9, 1985) is an American television personality, model and actress. In 2006, she rose to prominence after being cast in the reality television series The Hills, which chronicled the personal and professional lives of Patridge and friends Lauren Conrad, Heidi Montag and Whitney Port. During its production, she was cast in positions with Quixote Studios and Epic Records.

Later that year, Patridge competed on the 11th season of the American version of Dancing with the Stars, and finished in seventh place. In 2011, she commissioned her own television series, Audrina, which documented the lives of her immediate family and her. Patridge entered the film industry with roles in the horror film Sorority Row (2009) and direct-to-DVD film, Into the Blue 2: The Reef (2009), and was a supporting character in Honey 2 (2011). In 2014 and 2015, Patridge hosted NBC's late-night travel show 1st Look.

== Early life ==
Audrina Patridge is the daughter of Lynn and Mark Patridge. She is of English, German, Belgian, Italian, and Polish descent, and has three younger siblings: Casey; Mark Jr.; and Samantha. Patridge grew up in Yorba Linda, California. She attended Orange Coast College.

== Career ==
=== 2005–2010: The Hills and Dancing with the Stars ===
In 2005, MTV developed the reality television series The Hills as the spin-off of Laguna Beach: The Real Orange County. It originally chronicled the lives of Lauren Conrad, who appeared on its predecessor, her housemate Heidi Montag, and friends Whitney Port and Patridge. During production of the first season, producers cast her in a position with Quixote Studios. The following season, Patridge was cast with Epic Records. Later in the season, Montag ended her friendship with Patridge, though the women later reconciled. After Montag moved in with Spencer Pratt, Patridge and Lo Bosworth later became roommates with Conrad. During the third season, Patridge resumed an on-again, off-again relationship with boyfriend Justin Brescia, whom Bosworth jokingly nicknamed "Justin Bobby". Their turbulent relationship carried through each subsequent season.

On May 28, 2009, she confirmed during an interview on On Air with Ryan Seacrest that she was leaving The Hills to star in her own reality program documenting her life outside The Hills. Her final episode of the series was supposed to be on December 1, 2009. However, she later signed on for the series's sixth (and final) season while her new series, produced by Mark Burnett, set to air on MTV in mid-2010, was put on hold due to The Hills.

She landed her first film role as Kelsey in the action thriller film Into the Blue 2: The Reef (2009). The film was released direct-to-video on April 21, 2009. Patridge has made appearances on Mad TV and Do Not Disturb. In August 2008, she was cast as Megan in Sorority Row; production was carried out from October 2008 to early 2009, and the film was released on September 11, 2009. She appeared in an ad for PETA, encouraging people to adopt rather than buy pets. She also ranked at #16 in FHM's 100 Sexiest Women poll in 2010. Patridge appeared in Carl's Jr. commercials during 2009, 2010, and 2012.

During a live press conference on August 31, 2010, Patridge was confirmed to be a contestant on the eleventh season of ABC's Dancing with the Stars. Her professional partner was Tony Dovolani. Her first dance was the Cha-Cha-Cha and her second was the Quickstep. They were the sixth couple to be eliminated, finishing in seventh place.

Week #	Dance/Song	Judges' score			Result
Week #	Dance/Song	Inaba	Goodman	Tonioli	Result
1	Cha-cha-cha/"California Gurls"	6	7	6	Safe
2	Quickstep/"Love Machine"	8	8	7	Safe
3	Waltz/"Let It Be Me"	8	9	9	Safe
4	Argentine Tango/"Somebody to Love"	8/8	8/7	8/7	Safe
5	Rumba/"Unwritten"	7	8	8	Safe
6	Paso Doble/"Another One Bites the Dust"; Rock 'n Roll/"La Grange"	8 Awarded	8; 8	8 Points	Eliminated

=== 2011–2018: Audrina and continued acting roles ===
In October 2010, Patridge announced that she would star in VH1's reality television series Audrina, following her life after The Hills. The series premiered on April 17, 2011, with disappointing ratings, and it was canceled after one season. The series' ten-episode run averaged 610,000 viewers. She was also credited as an executive producer of the series.

In January 2011, she signed on to star as talent manager Tracy James in the webseries Dream Maker. The series ran from June 21, 2011, to September 12, 2011, on Yobi.tv.

Patridge hosted the NBC late-night travel series 1st Look in 2014 and 2015.

=== 2019–present: The Hills: New Beginnings ===
At the 2018 MTV Video Music Awards, MTV announced a reboot of The Hills entitled The Hills: New Beginnings, slated to premiere in 2019. Patridge was announced as part of the cast of the new series. The show premiered on June 24, 2019, and followed the original cast members in their mid-30s as they navigate their daily lives in Los Angeles. In January 2022, Deadline announced that MTV had canceled the series after two seasons.

In July 2022, Patridge launched a podcast with her former The Hills co-stars Brody Jenner and Frankie Delgado called, Was It Real? The Hills Rewatch, revisiting the show. The podcast consisted of 30 episodes.

Patridge's memoir entitled Choices: To the Hills and Back Again was released on July 26, 2022, by Gallery Books.

== Personal life ==
In March 2008, nude photos of Patridge were illegally published online. "They were taken when I was just out of high school and beginning to model," Patridge has explained. "I was naïve, overly trusting of people, and inexperienced."

In August 2008, Patridge purchased a house in Los Angeles' Hollywood Dell neighborhood. On February 22, 2009, Patridge's home was burgled by two members of the Bling Ring.

Patridge began dating Corey Bohan, a motorcycle rider and professional BMX dirt bike rider, in 2008. On November 20, 2015, Bohan proposed after getting her parents' permission and she accepted. Patridge gave birth to daughter Kirra Max on June 24, 2016. The couple married on November 5, 2016. On September 20, 2017, Patridge filed for divorce from Bohan and filed a restraining order against him. On December 20, 2018, the divorce was finalized.

On February 14, 2023, Patridge announced on her Instagram that her niece Sadie Raine Loza had died one week after her 15th birthday. On January 22, 2024, Audrina appeared on America's Most Wanted along with her sister (and Sadie's mother) Casey Loza to discuss Sadie's death from a fentanyl overdose.

== Filmography ==
=== Film ===
Year	Title	Role	Notes
2009	Into the Blue 2: The Reef	Kelsey	
2009	Sorority Row	Megan Blaire	
2011	Honey 2	Hot Celebrity Judge	

=== Television ===
Year	Title	Role	Notes
2006–2010	The Hills	Herself	Main cast: Season 1–6; 102 episodes
2007	Legally Blonde: The Musical	Herself	Host; Uncredited
2008	MADtv	Various	Episode: "Episode #14.2"
2008	Do Not Disturb	Girl from The Hills	Episode: "Birdcage"
2009	Family Guy	Herself	Voice role; Episode: "We Love You, Conrad"
2010	Dancing with the Stars	Herself	Contestant on season 11; 13 episodes
2011	Audrina	Herself	Main cast; 10 episodes, also as executive producer
2011	Dream Maker	Tracy James	Main role; 13 episodes
2012	Celebrity Ghost Stories	Herself	Episode: "Cindy Williams/Audrina Patridge/Giancarlo Esposito/Joan Van Ark"
2014–2015	1st Look	Herself	Host; 20 episodes
2016	Hell's Kitchen	Herself	Restaurant Patron; Episode: "18 Chefs Compete"
2016	Cupcake Wars	Herself	Contestant; Episode: "Celebrity: Cheerleader Cupcakes"
2016	Hollywood Medium with Tyler Henry	Herself	Episode: "Audrina Patridge/Moby/Austin Mahone/Roselyn Sanchez"
2017	Celebrity Mom: Audrina Patridge	Herself	10 episodes
2019–2021	The Hills: New Beginnings	Herself	Main cast; 25 episodes
2020	Very Cavallari	Herself	Episode: "Just Like the Old Days"
2020	Celebrity Family Feud	Herself	Contestant; Episode: "Cedric The Entertainer vs. Wayne Brady and The Hills: New Beginnings vs. Jersey Shore: Family Vacation"

=== Podcast ===
Year	Title	Role	Notes
2022–2023	Was it Real? The Hills Rewatch	Host	Kast Talk

== Published works ==
- Patridge, Audrina (2022). Choices: To the Hills and Back Again. Gallery Books.

Preceded by Ali Fedotowsky	1st Look host 2014-2015	Succeeded by Ashley Roberts
