= Florian Bellanger =

French pastry chef (born 1968)

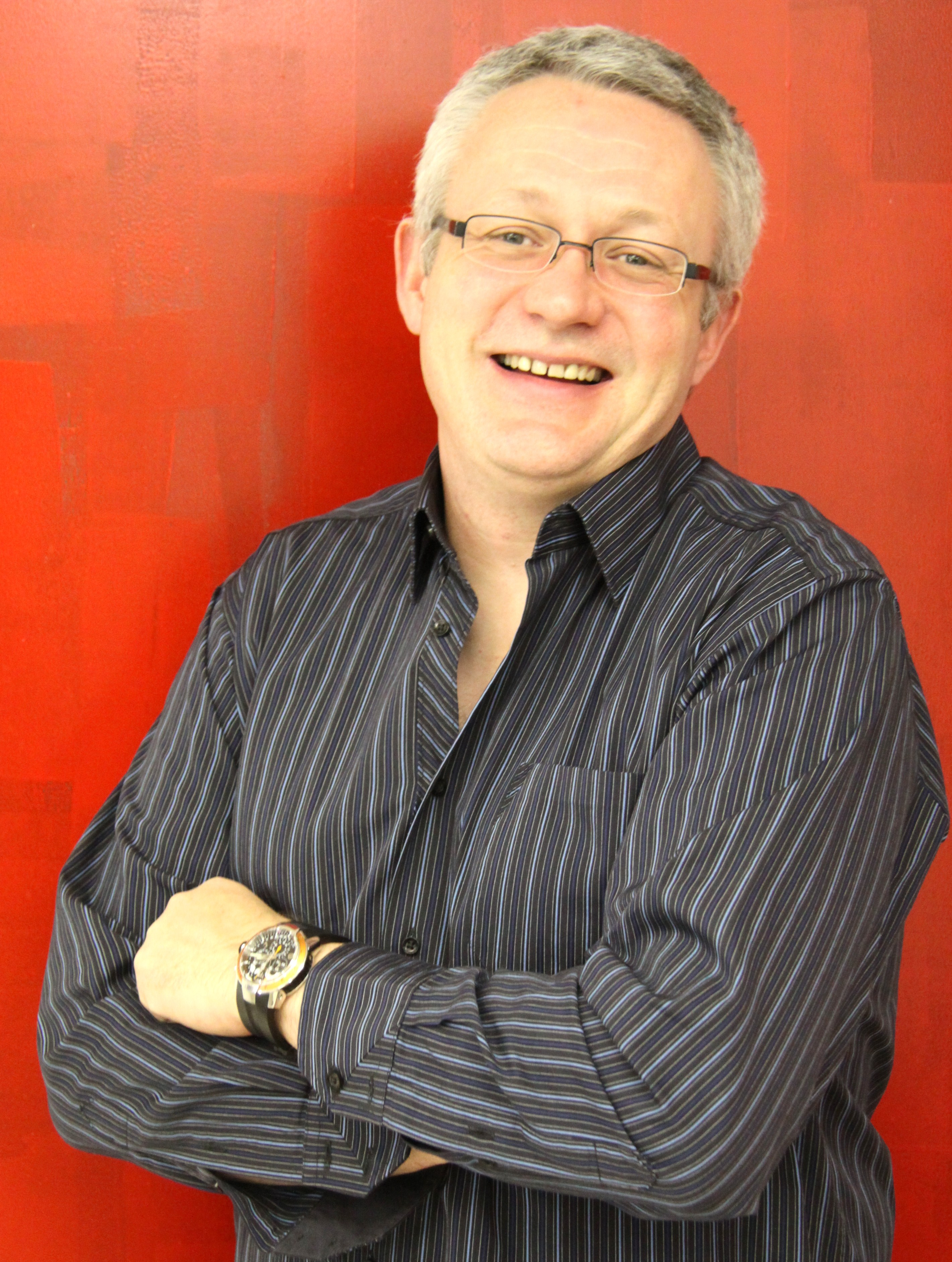
- Bellanger in 2010
- Born: 20 April 1968 (age 58)
- Culinary career
- Television show: Cupcake Wars

Florian Bellanger [bɛlɑ̃ˈʒe] (born 20 April 1968) is a French pastry chef, formerly the executive pastry chef at the famous Parisian pastry and candy shop, Fauchon. He is a permanent judge on the Food Network's competition series Cupcake Wars, appearing in over nine seasons and 135 episodes to date.

== Early career ==
Bellanger grew up in Paris and spent much of his free afternoons baking for his family. However, a childhood chocolate allergy prevented him from enjoying sweets and desserts for six years, which temporarily discouraged his desire to bake. At age 15, Bellanger applied to one of Paris's prestigious pastry schools, the École de Paris des Métiers de la Table ("Paris school of table skills"), but was rejected for being a year too young. By 1986, he graduated from the school with a specialization in pastry cooking and a specialty in chocolate and ice cream; he now says chocolate is his favorite ingredient and admires its versatility, claiming it is "fun" and something "taken for granted."

Before starting his own company, Bellanger was the executive pastry chef at Fauchon and oversaw 24 other pastry chefs at its Tea Salon flagship store in New York City, a "legendary French Epicurean emporium" of cakes, cookies, ice creams and sorbets. There, he became known for creating inventive combinations of flavors outside of the norms of tradition, such as éclairs flavored with orange zest, passion fruit or coconut and raspberry marshmallow cake, Toulouse violet ice cream and raspberry-chili pepper sorbet. From 1991 to 1994, he was under the command of famous French pastry chef Pierre Hermé and was also the executive pastry chef for Fauchon's flagship store in Qatar from 1994 to 1996.

Bellanger was pastry chef of the world-renowned (three Michelin stars) restaurant Le Bernardin from 1996 to 2001.

== Career ==
Bellanger is now the chef and owner of Mad Mac Macarons Mad Mac NYC "the Authentic French Macarons and Madeleines" an acclaimed French cookie and pastry company, which he helped fund in 2006. Mad Mac serves retail, food service, and hospitality industries and has been recognized as a leader in quality and innovation in the Macaron industry.

Bellanger is a member of City Harvest's Food Council and a guest chef at the French Culinary Institute in Manhattan, New York. He also spends his free time donating to charities such as C-CAP Careers Through Culinary Arts Program C-CAP Home

=== Recognition ===
Bellanger was named one of the 10 Best Pastry Chefs in America in 2003 and 2004 by Pastry Art & Design magazine. In 2000 and 2001, the James Beard Foundation acclaimed Bellanger's accomplishments with a nomination for "Outstanding Pastry Chef."

He is also the Jury President of the US Pastry Competition which is held every February in NYC, and has been featured on many networks including CNN, NBC, Food Network, and Martha Stewart Living. Bellanger's cake and pastry works have received attention in various magazines and publications including House Beautiful, Martha Stewart Weddings, Forbes, Brides, Modern Bride, GQ magazine, Time Out magazine, People, The New York Times, InStyle magazine, Pastry Art & Design, Food Arts, Chocolatier magazine, The Nibble, Delta Sky magazine and New York Magazine, and PastryScoop.com.

=== Awards ===
- James Beard Foundation "Outstanding Pastry Chef of the Year" Nomination 2000 and 2001
- 10 Best Pastry Chefs of America 2003 and 2004 (Pastry Art and Design magazine)
- Lifetime Achievement Award - 2013 US Pastry Competition
- Hall of Fame Inductee - Dessert Professional Magazine 2013
- Chevalier de l'Ordre du Merite Agricole (French Government)
