= Into the Blue 2: The Reef =

2009 American action film by Stephen Herek

- DVD cover
- Directed by: Stephen Herek
- Written by: Mitchell Kapner
- Based on: Characters by Matt Johnson
- Produced by: David Buelow; David Brookwell; Sean McNamara; Hudson Hickman; Sara Berrisford; Craig Roessler
- Starring: Chris Carmack; Laura Vandervoort; Marsha Thomason; Michael Graziadei; Mircea Monroe; David Anders
- Cinematography: Thomas Yatsko
- Edited by: Robin Russell
- Music by: Robert Duncan
- Production companies: Mandalay Pictures; Brookwell McNamara Entertainment; MGM Television
- Distributed by: 20th Century Fox Home Entertainment
- Release date: April 21, 2009
- Running time: 92 minutes
- Country: United States
- Language: English
- Budget: $14 million

Into the Blue 2: The Reef is an American action-thriller direct-to-video film, and a sequel to the 2005 film Into the Blue. None of the cast from the first film return, so the sequel only shares similar themes and situations to the original Into the Blue. It was directed by Stephen Herek, and was released on DVD in North America by 20th Century Fox Home Entertainment on April 21, 2009.

== Plot ==
In Honolulu, Hawaii, a man dumps containers into the ocean and then goes to meet with men in suits expecting to get paid. But because he dumped the containers and altered the schedule of those container shipments to the customer, he is killed.

Menwhile, a couple, Sebastian and Dani, is dive surfing with a model. The group own a snorkeling business that rents out equipment. Sebastian does not want to do this line of work forever.

Sebastian hangs out with his friend and employee Mace and his girlfriend Kimi, Dani's best friend, who have a difficult relationship because Mace tends to get involved with other women. While at work, they are visited by Carlton and Azra, a couple who wants to hire them for diving in the North Reef for a week because they are looking for the Spanish ship San Cristobal, which sank somewhere near the North Reef and is rumored to contain a treasure.

Sebastian has been trying for years to find it but Carlton happens to have a map which may lead to the treasure. Sebastian and Dani agree to help the couple. The four go on various diving expeditions to find the treasure.

Dani, Kimi, Sebastian, and Mace eventually get involved in separate beach volleyball competitions. Sebastian and Mace go against their main diving competitors, Avery, who dates a girl named Kelsey. While at a club, another customer hits on the women and grabs the arm of Azra, who puts him in a headlock.

Menwhile, Carlton is not really looking for the San Cristobal. He actually helps big clients smuggle treasure to other locations. The following day, Carlton and Azra tell Sebastian and Dani that if they help them find the two containers, they will earn $500,000. If Carlton does not find the containers in a week, the men will kill them. He is willing to pay them a lot of money as an apology because the men who hired him know Sebastian and Dani's names and their lives are in danger too.

Now, both Sebastian and Dani are forced to help Carlton and Azra find the containers. While they are at sea, Avery takes notice and starts looking to find whatever they are looking for.

Dani convinces Sebastian that they must look to see what is in the containers. The two take their boat out to sea late at night to dive and inspect the containers. In the containers, they find a bomb. After returning, they are greeted by Carlton and Azra, who have been hiding in their boat and are ready to kill them. Carlton tells them that in container one there is the casing and in container two there is a nuclear warhead. Together they make a powerful weapon. Their goal is to create a second Pearl Harbor.

Dani jumps off the boat to try to get help, while Carlton orders Milos to shoot at her in the water. Azra subdues Sebastian, who believes that Dani is dead. However, Dani survives and tries to swim after the boat before eventually passing out on a floating device. Later that evening, Azra and Milo ambush Mace and Kimi in their apartment and hold them hostage with Sebastian on the boat, where they spend the night bound and gagged with duct tape. The next morning, Sebastian attempts to call for help on the emergency communicator while still tied up, only to be caught by Carlton. He gives Sebastian and Mace a final warning; if they do not do what he says, Kimi will be killed. Meanwhile, Dani is found by the coast guard and is taken to the hospital. Azra tries to kill Dani in her room, but she runs away and a chase ensues. Meanwhile, Sebastian and Mace try to bring up the containers for Carlton. Mace purposely messes up and Kimi is killed. Sebastian and Mace rebel, ending in Carlton and his bodyguard dead. Dani outruns Azra, who kills her boss so she can disappear again. Dani, Sebastian, and Mace reunite. They then have Kimi's funeral.

Six months later, Sebastian and Mace find the San Cristobal and buy a boat. Sebastian, Dani, and Mace eventually celebrate their new riches.

== Cast ==
- Chris Carmack as Sebastian
- Laura Vandervoort as Dani
- Marsha Thomason as Azra
- Michael Graziadei as Mace
- Mircea Monroe as Kimi
- Audrina Patridge as Kelsey
- Amanda Kimmel as Amanda
- Parvati Shallow as Parvati
- Rand Holdren as Avery
- David Anders as Carlton
- Mark Kubr as Milos
- Timothy Lechner as Detective Yorkin

== Production ==
Into the Blue 2 was Audrina Patridge's first film role. It was to be directed and produced by Charles Winkler, with Hudson Hickman, Craig Roessler and Sarah Berrisford as the executive producers.

It was filmed in O'ahu, Hawaii, United States from May to June 2008. Editing was carried out from September 2 until November 13, 2008.

== Release ==
On November 19, 2008, it was announced that it would be released direct-to-DVD in spring 2009 despite previous plans for a 2010 theatrical release. The DVD artwork was released on December 3, 2008; the trailer following on January 20, 2009. It was released on DVD in the United States and Canada on April 21, 2009.

It was released in cinemas in the United Kingdom on August 2, 2009. According to TMZ.com, the film got a theatrical release in Brazil, Australia, Spain, Germany and Italy in summer/autumn 2009. The movie was released direct-to-DVD in Australia on February 10, 2010.
