= KLEP =

Television station in Newark, Arkansas (1985–2005)

- Newark, Arkansas; United States
- Channels: Analog: 17 (UHF)

Programming
- Affiliations: Educational independent (1985–2005?)

Ownership
- Owner: Newark Public Schools

History
- First air date: November 12, 1985
- Last air date: April 19, 2005 (license canceled)

Technical information
- Licensing authority: FCC
- Facility ID: 48698
- ERP: 15.1 kW
- HAAT: 162 m (531 ft)
- Transmitter coordinates: 35°43′27.9″N 91°26′35″W

Links
- Public license information: Public file; LMS

KLEP (channel 17) was an independent non-commercial educational television station in Newark, Arkansas, United States, owned by Newark Public Schools. It broadcast local academic and public affairs programming beginning at 6 p.m. on weekdays from its 1985 sign-on until it quit broadcasting in the mid-2000s. It never returned; the corresponding broadcast license was eventually canceled on April 19, 2005.
