= Audrina =

- Also known as: The Audrina Show
- Genre: Reality television
- Starring: Audrina Patridge; Lynne Patridge; Mark Patridge; Casey Loza; Marky Patridge; Samantha Patridge
- Opening theme: "Uncharted" by Sara Bareilles
- Country of origin: United States
- Original language: English
- No. of seasons: 1
- No. of episodes: 10

Production
- Executive producers: Audrina Patridge; Dave Fleming; Mark Burnett; Michael Bloom
- Running time: 30 minutes
- Production company: Mark Burnett Productions

Original release
- Network: VH1
- Release: April 17 – June 19, 2011

Related
- The Hills

Audrina is an American reality television series that originally aired on VH1 from April 17, 2011, until June 19, 2011. The series aired one season and focuses on the lives of Audrina Patridge, who came to prominence as a cast member on The Hills, and her family. Its premise was originated with Mark Burnett, who additionally served as the executive producer.

== Production ==
In 2009, MTV ordered a pilot for the series, then titled The Audrina Show, but it was not picked up to series on the network.

In October 2010, Patridge announced that her then-unnamed reality series was picked up by MTV's sister network, VH1, with Mark Burnett as executive producer. Patridge spoke with Us Magazine about the series: "The show with Mark Burnett got picked up by VH1 so the journey continues! It's a reality show about me and my family. Everything that people have wondered about me, they'll now get to see! And I hope Tony [Dovolani, her Dancing with the Stars partner] will be on it! I'd love to make some trips to NY to see him because we are such good friends now!"

In January 2011, VH1 announced the series name, Audrina. In March 2011, the show's first promo aired, announcing that it will premiere on April 17, 2011, at 9:00 PM.

It was announced on September 1, 2011, that the series would not be renewed for a second season. The series' ten-episode run averaged 610,000 viewers.

== Cast ==
Cast member	Notes
Main cast
Audrina Patridge	Audrina is a television personality, actress, and model. She came to prominence after being cast on The Hills, and was featured on the eleventh season of Dancing with the Stars.
Lynne Patridge	Lynne is the family matriarch. In 2010, she gained notoriety after a video of her drunken rant regarding Audrina's elimination from Dancing with the Stars went viral.
Mark Patridge	Mark is the family patriarch and the CEO of Patridge Motors.
Casey Loza	Casey is Audrina, Marky, and Samantha's sister. She is married to professional dirt biker Kyle Loza, with whom she has two children.
"Marky" Patridge	Marky is Audrina, Casey, and Samantha's brother.
Samantha Patridge	Samantha is Audrina, Casey, and Marky's youngest sister.
Main cast
Corey Bohan	Corey is Audrina's boyfriend.
Kyle Loza	Kyle is Casey's husband.

^{1} Only members to receive star billing in opening credits.

== Episodes ==
No.	Title	Original release date	U.S. viewers (millions)
1	"This Is MY Reality"	April 17, 2011	0.79
Audrina does a Palm Springs bikini photo shoot, later house-hunting with Marky. The Patridges have a family dinner.
2	"Celebrate Good Times, C'Mon!"	April 24, 2011	0.60
Audrina, Sammy, and Mark go jewelry shopping for Mark and Lynn's 26th anniversary. Audrina, Casey, and Sammy plan an anniversary party. Audrina goes out with her friends
3	"Feel the Yum Yums"	April 24, 2011	N/A
Corey is in town for a short while and Audrina tries to find time in her busy schedule to be with him. The episode aired outside of primetime.
4	"Cheers to the Freakin' Weekend"	May 1, 2011	0.46
Audrina calls and invites Casey to join her and Lynn in NYC. While Audrina goes to meetings and fittings, she sends Lynn and Casey on some NYC adventures.
5	"The Last Supper"	May 8, 2011	0.67
Audrina is asked to come in for a business meeting; Casey spends quality time with her husband; Kyle is concerned about the drama at dinner
6	"Fallout"	May 15, 2011	0.65
Audrina tries to mediate family drama; Mark and Lynn search for an anniversary ring; Audrina searches for an assistant.
7	"Put the Gun Down"	May 22, 2011	0.63
Audrina makes an appearance in Las Vegas and does a shoot with Funny or Die; Corey returns to L.A.
8	"86 Missed Calls"	May 29, 2011	0.58
Audrina and her friends arrive in Palm Beach; Audrina gets polo lessons; model Nic Roldan invites the ladies for drinks; Corey makes an angry phone call.
9	"Dump his A..."	June 12, 2011	0.55
Audrina attends a polo game; Nic and Audrina spend the day together; Lynn helps with a meeting; Audrina and Mark try to fix a rift.
10	"Smile for the Camera"	June 19, 2011	0.53
Audrina and Corey meet to talk; Audrina and Sammy spend the day together; the family gets together.

== International airings ==
Country / Region	Network	Premiere
Netherlands	MTV	August 21, 2011
Australia	MTV	July 2011
Poland	MTV	July 3, 2011
Greece	MTV Greece	July 7, 2011
Brazil	VH1 Brasil	July 2011
Canada	MTV	April 21, 2011
Italy	MTV Italia	July 2011
United Kingdom	MTV	July 5, 2011
New Zealand	MTV	July 6, 2011
Finland	MTV Finland	August 21, 2011

== Critical reception ==
John Griffiths of Us Weekly gave the show two stars and wrote, "Sure, siren Audrina Patridge appealed on The Hills. But she fails to yield much reality-star power in this ho-hum series". Brian Lowry of Variety was also negative and wrote, "The whole thing plays like a poor woman's version of Keeping Up with the Kardashians. Audrina poses for a bikini calendar near the outset and discusses moving in with her scamp of a younger brother. 'There's never gonna be a dull moment', she says. Based on the first two episodes, I beg to differ".
