= List of Cupcake Wars episodes =

Cupcake Wars is an American reality competition series which premiered on August 7, 2009 on cable television network Food Network. The show is hosted by Justin Willman and based on creating unique and professional-style cupcakes. The show is similar to successful Chopped cooking show aired on the same network, in that it starts with four contestants who are eliminated one-by-one in three rounds, with the winning team receiving $10,000 and the opportunity to be featured in an upcoming event. Each team consists of a primary baker and supporting baker.

As of May 22, 2018, 137 episodes of Cupcake Wars have aired, concluding the eleventh season.

== Series overview ==
Season	Episodes	Originally released	
Season	Episodes	First released	Last released
1	9	December 27, 2009	August 3, 2010
2	13	December 7, 2010	March 8, 2011
3	13	June 14, 2011	September 11, 2011
4	13	December 4, 2011	March 4, 2012
5	13	March 11, 2012	June 24, 2012
6	14	May 13, 2012	September 23, 2012
7	13	October 7, 2012	March 24, 2013
8	13	April 7, 2013	July 7, 2013
9	13	September 7, 2013	December 28, 2013
10	11	April 11, 2016	August 15, 2016
11	12	November 28, 2017	May 22, 2018

== Episodes ==
=== Season 1 (2009–10) ===
No. overall	No. in season	Title	Original release date	Prod. code
1	1	"Hot and Spicy Alma Awards"	December 27, 2009	WS0100
Cupcake Wars pits Cupcake vs. Cupcake in Food Network's tastiest competition yet. In this episode, four cupcake makers vie to have their treats presented at the Alma Awards. Based on taste and presentation, only one will win the gig. We are about to put on our helmet, pick up our frosting gun and go to battle. The war is on!
2	2	"George and Ann Lopez Charity Golf Tournament"	June 13, 2010	WS0101
Four talented cupcake bakers vie for the chance to have their delicious displays featured at a charity golf challenge hosted by comedian George Lopez and wife Ann Lopez. Contestants include: Hollis Wilder of Sweet! (Orlando, Fla.), Karla Jennings of Sugar Cupcakery (Milford, Ohio), Catarah Hampshire of Southern Girl Desserts (Los Angeles) and Todd Becker of Beckers Bakery (Manhattan Beach, Calif.). WINNER: Hollis Wilder.
3	3	"SeaWorld Birthday Bash"	June 15, 2010	WS0102
Four creative cupcake bakers go head-to-head in hopes of having their sweets featured at a seaside birthday party. Contestants include: Lindsay Ann Morton of Dollhouse Bake Shoppe (Santa Monica, Calif.), Brett Thompson of Milk (Los Angeles), Allyson Fiander of Daddy Cakes (Topeka, Kan.) and Tracey Buchanan of Sweet Bakery & Café (Ellicot City, Md.). WINNER: Lindsay Ann Morton.
4	4	"Match-Making Party"	June 22, 2010	WS0103
Four artistic cupcake bakers battle it out in an aphrodisiac-inspired challenge for the opportunity to have their mouth-watering treats featured at a star-studded magazine party. Contestants include: Chloe Coscarelli of chefchloe.com (Los Angeles), Shannon Noormand of Crushcakes Cupcakery (Santa Barbara, Calif.), Shayrin Badillo of Cupcakes Nouveau (Coral Gables, Fla.) and Jeff Bonilla of Cups (La Jolla, Calif.). WINNER: Chloe Coscarelli.
5	5	"Ace of Cakes 100th Episode Celebration"	June 29, 2010	WS0104
Four talented cupcake bakers vie for the chance to have their sweets displayed at an anniversary party for Ace of Cakes' 100th episode. Cake-master Duff Goldman shares his expertise as a guest judge and contestants include: Jessica Cuff of The Coffee Shop (Gilbert, Ariz.), Michael Centimore of Cupcake Charlies (Mashpee, Mass.), Alyssa Magliato of The Perfect Circle Cupcakery (Orange, Calif.) and Erica Tucker of Sweet E's Bake Shop (Los Angeles). WINNER: Jessica Cuff.
6	6	"Survival of the Fittest"	July 6, 2010	WS0105
Four creative cupcake bakers battle it out for the chance to have their over-the-top cupcake displays featured at an L.A. museum. Contestants include: Lisa Cowden of Lulu's Cupcakes (Scottsdale, Ariz.), Wendy Jones of Whodidily Cupcakes (Santa Barbara, Calif.), MaryAnne Tongko of Cupcakes & Co (Burbank, Calif.) and Jeff Martin of Smallcakes (Overland Park, Kan.). WINNER: Lisa Cowden.
7	7	"Good Cause Cupcakes"	July 20, 2010	WS0106
Four artistic bakers vie for the chance to have their cupcakes featured at a charity event. Contestants include: Rebecca Grammer-Ybarra of Suite 106 Cupcakery (Rancho Cucamonga, Calif.), Kara Haspel Lind of Kara's Cupcakes (San Francisco), Ivey Childers of Ivey Cakes (Franklin, Tenn.) and Lisa Donahue of For Heavens Cakes (Thousand Oaks, Calif.). WINNER: Rebecca Grammer-Ybarra.
8	8	"Film Festival Face-Off"	July 27, 2010	WS0107
Four talented cupcake bakers battle it out for the chance to have their over-the-top sugar displays featured at a film festival. Contestants include: Arleen Scavone of Sweet Arleen's (Westlake Village, Calif.), Stefanie Gaxiola of Red Velvet Stefanie (Los Angeles), Zoey Devall of Bee Sweet Bakery Cupcakes (New Orleans, La.) and Johnny Manganiotis of Mr. Cupcakes (Clifton, N.J.). WINNER: Arleen Scavone
9	9	"Classic Cupcake Challenge"	August 3, 2010	WS0108
Four creative bakers vie for the chance to have their cupcakes on display at a vintage-inspired event. Contestants include: Eileen Kerbel of Molly's Cupcakes (Chicago), Farshid Hakim of La Provence Patisserie Café (Beverly Hills, Calif.), Lindsay Esparza of Cupcakes (Scottsdale, Ariz.) and Jasmine Frank of Jazzy Cakes (Sherman Oaks, Calif.). WINNER: Eileen Kerbel

=== Season 2 (2010–11) ===
No. overall	No. in season	Title	Original release date	Prod. code
10	1	"Tree Lighting"	December 7, 2010	WS0201UH
Four talented cupcake bakers vie for the chance to have their delicious displays featured at a star-studded holiday tree lighting ceremony in the heart of Hollywood. WINNER: Brenda Deponte
11	2	"Cirque du Soleil"	February 15, 2011	WS0202
Four creative cupcake bakers go head to head in hopes of having their cupcakes featured at Cirque Du Soleil's album release party for the new Las Vegas spectacular "Viva Elvis." WINNER: Ron Bzdewka
12	3	"LA Kings"	December 21, 2010	WS0203
Four gifted cupcake bakers battle for the chance to have their tasty treats featured at the LA Kings Opening Night Fan Fest to celebrate the start of the new hockey season. WINNER: Victoria Donnelly
13	4	"Tree People"	January 4, 2011	WS0204
Four creative cupcake bakers go head to head in hopes of having their cupcakes featured at the Tree Peoples' annual Harvest Moon Gala benefiting environmental conservation. WINNER: Stephen Davalos
14	5	"Wedding Planner"	January 11, 2011	WS0205UH
Four talented cupcake bakers vie for the chance to have their delicious displays featured amongst some of the wedding industry's most influential tastemakers, hosted by celebrity wedding planner, Mindy Weiss. WINNER: Andrea Ballus
15	6	"LA Auto Show"	January 25, 2011	WS0206
Four creative cupcake bakers go head to head in hopes of having their delicious displays featured amongst next year's coolest rides at the world-renowned LA Auto Show's exclusive preview night WINNER: Kim Thurman
16	7	"Rose Parade"	January 18, 2011	WS0207
Four Cupcake Wars champions set out to prove they're the best of the best as they fight to have their delicious displays featured at the coronation of the 2011 Rose Queen, as well as the special grand prize of being featured in the internationally renowned Rose Parade. WINNER: Hollis Wilder
17	8	"Hard Rock"	December 28, 2010	WS0208
Four gifted cupcake bakers battle for the chance to have their tasty treats on display at the Hard Rock Cafe's Pinktober concert event, featuring music legend and breast cancer survivor Melissa Etheridge. WINNER: Dorothy Tong
18	9	"Grammys"	February 1, 2011	WS0209
Four Cupcake Wars veterans return to the battlefield for another shot at victory and a chance to serve the music industry's biggest stars at the Grammy's nominee concert. WINNER: Alyssa Magliato
19	10	"Valentine's Day"	February 8, 2011	WS0210
Four talented cupcake bakers vie for the chance to have their delicious displays featured at a romantic ocean-side wine tasting for couples, with romance icon, Fabio, as the special guest judge. WINNER: Marilyn Norris
20	11	"Walk of Fame"	February 22, 2011	WS0211
Four talented cupcake bakers vie for the chance to have their cupcakes take center stage as the legends of film, television and radio celebrate the 50th Anniversary of the world famous Hollywood Walk of Fame. WINNER: Casey Reinhardt
21	12	"AFI Young Hollywood"	March 1, 2011	WS0212
Four gifted cupcake bakers battle for the chance to rub elbows with some of the hottest stars of the silver screen and have their cupcakes featured at the American Film Institute's Young Hollywood Party. WINNER: Jennifer Harrison
22	13	"Ice House"	March 8, 2011	WS0213UH
Four creative cupcake bakers go head to head for the chance to serve some of Hollywood's legends of laughter at the 50th anniversary of the Ice House comedy club. WINNER: Doron Peterson

=== Season 3 (2011) ===
No. overall	No. in season	Title	Original release date	Prod. code
23	1	"Kentucky Derby"	June 14, 2011	WS0301H
It will be a real horse race when four talented cupcake bakers vie for the chance to have their delicious displays featured at the red carpet celebration for the famed Kentucky Derby. WINNER: Annette Starbuck
24	2	"Bollywood Bake-Off"	June 21, 2011	WS0302H
East will meet West when four gifted cupcake makers compete for the chance to have their cupcakes at the center of the opening night party for the Indian Film Festival taking place in the heart of Hollywood. WINNER: Lily Fischer
25	3	"Cupcakes: The Final Frontier"	June 28, 2011	WS0303H
Four out-of-this-world cupcake bakers will fight for the chance to have their tasty treats front and center at a VIP party honoring the first man in space. WINNER: Casey Schiller
26	4	"Tim Burton Bake-Off"	July 5, 2011	WS0304H
Four artful cupcake bakers will compete for the chance to have their cupcakes featured at an exclusive party celebrating the art of famed movie director Tim Burton. WINNER: Lori Jacobs
27	5	"Tony Awards"	July 12, 2011	WS0305H
Four cupcake bakers, who have all won Cupcake Wars in the past, return to the battlefield for another shot at victory and a chance to serve Broadway's brightest at a VIP party for the 65th Annual Tony Awards. WINNER: Arleen Scavone
28	6	"Work Of Art"	July 19, 2011	WS0306H
Four talented cupcake makers will go head to head in hopes of having their cupcake creations at the center of an exclusive party for the Festival of Arts, where paintings and statues comes to life. WINNER: Krista Lautenbach
29	7	"Dodgers Cupcakes"	July 26, 2011	WS0307H
Four cupcake bakers will face off for the chance to have their cupcakes featured at a celebration honoring the world renowned LA Dodgers at a VIP party at the stadium. WINNER: Courtney Bonning
30	8	"Miss USA"	August 2, 2011	WS0308H
Four gifted cupcake makers will compete to be crowned the winner and have their cupcake creations take center stage at a huge party celebrating the 60th anniversary of the Miss USA pageant in Las Vegas. WINNER: Brady Breese
31	9	"Going For Gold: Espys"	August 9, 2011	WS0309H
Four amazing bakers will have to put their game faces on if they want to have their cupcakes eaten by the biggest names in sports at this year's ESPYS. WINNER: Jane Marie Kane
32	10	"Comic Con Cupcakes"	August 16, 2011	WS0310H
Four talented bakers will have to use their super powers if they want a chance to have their delicious display take center stage at Comic-Con's exclusive Masquerade Party. WINNER: Anthony Valerio
33	11	"World Series Of Poker"	August 23, 2011	WS0311H
Four gifted bakers will ante up for a chance to have their cupcake creations featured at an exclusive party for the World Series of Poker in Las Vegas. WINNER: Tina Swanson
34	12	"Surf's Up!"	August 28, 2011	WS0312H
Surf's up for four amazing bakers who will fight for the chance to have their cupcakes at the center of a beachside VIP party for the U.S. Open of Surfing. WINNER: Stephanie Franz
35	13	"Jennette McCurdy Country Cupcakes"	September 11, 2011	WS0313H
Four talented bakers will vie for the chance to have their cupcake creations take center stage at an exclusive party celebrating the record release for iCarly and country music star Jennette McCurdy. WINNER: Heather McDonnell

=== Season 4 (2011–12) ===
No. overall	No. in season	Title	Original release date	Prod. code
36	1	"The Nutcracker"	December 4, 2011	WS0401H
Four talented bakers compete to have their cupcakes at the opening night party for the New York City Ballet's performance of The Nutcracker. WINNER: Jason Hisley
37	2	"Hollywood Christmas Parade"	December 11, 2011	WS0402H
'Tis the season for cupcakes as four talented cupcake bakers battle for a place among the stars at the Hollywood Christmas Parade. WINNER: Alison Riede
38	3	"The Closer 100th Episode"	December 18, 2011	WS0403H
Four returning bakers who all lost previous Cupcake Wars come back to fight for redemption and a place at the 100th Episode celebration of the hit show "The Closer." WINNER: Kyra Bussanich
39	4	"Final Cup(cakes)"	January 8, 2012	WS0404H
Four cupcake bakers try to score their way into the celebration of the Major League Soccer Cup Finals. WINNER: Andrea Maue
40	5	"Wicked"	January 1, 2012	WS0405H
Four cupcake bakers battle for a place at the star-studded party for the Los Angeles opening of the hit Broadway musical "Wicked." WINNER: Janelle Copeland
41	6	"American Music Awards"	January 15, 2012	WS0406H
Four returning Cupcake Wars champions fight to present their cupcakes to music's biggest celebrities at the after party for the American Music Awards. WINNER: Doron Peterson
42	7	"Rose Bowl"	January 22, 2012	WS0407H
Four talented bakers battle their way to the end zone for a place at the VIP party for the 2012 Rose Bowl. WINNER: Abby Jiminez
43	8	"I Love Lucy 60th Anniversary"	January 29, 2012	WS0408H
Four cupcake bakers vie for a place at the star-studded celebration of the 60th anniversary of "I Love Lucy." WINNER: Michelle Spell
44	9	"Year of the Cupcake"	February 5, 2012	WS0409H
The Year of the Dragon is about to begin, as four bakers battle to have their cupcakes at the Los Angeles celebration of the Chinese New Year. WINNER: Winnete Mcintosh-Ambrose
45	10	"Cupcake Love Story"	February 12, 2012	WS0410H
Four bakers compete for their cupcakes to take center stage at a VIP party for the biggest stars of opera. WINNER: Paul Conti
46	11	"Monster Cupcakes"	February 19, 2012	WS0411H
It's monster truck madness as four bakers battle for a place at the VIP Pre-Race Pit Party for Monster Truck Jam. WINNER: Heather Saffer
47	12	"Screamfest"	February 26, 2012	WS0412H
Horror director Eli Roth is special guest judge, as four cupcake bakers try to scare their way into the closing night VIP party for Screamfest at the famous Grauman's Chinese Theater in Hollywood. WINNER: Angela Chandler
48	13	"Vegan Bake-Off"	March 4, 2012	WS0413H
In the first ever Cupcake Wars all-vegan showdown, four vegan bakers fight to have their cupcakes at the opening day celebration for the inaugural Los Angeles Green Festival. WINNER: Stephanie Sparkles

=== Season 5 (2012) ===
No. overall	No. in season	Title	Original release date	Prod. code
49	1	"Girl Scouts 100th Birthday"	March 11, 2012	WS0501H
Four bakers compete for the ultimate merit badge: their cupcakes at the 100th birthday bash for the Girl Scouts of the USA. WINNER: Thais Da Silva
50	2	"Cowboy Cupcakes"	March 18, 2012	WS0502H
Four bakers try to hang on as they fight for a place at the star-studded party for the Professional Bull Rider's Award Ceremony on the Las Vegas strip. WINNER: Johnnie Sue Messler
51	3	"Cupcake Couture"	March 25, 2012	WS0503H
Cupcakes meet high fashion as four talented bakers vie for a place at a VIP celebration for Vanessa and Angela Simmons' Pastry Shoes. WINNER: Mamie Doyle
52	4	"Funny Or Die"	April 1, 2012	WS0504H
It's time to laugh out loud as four cupcake bakers try to take their cupcakes viral at a VIP party for FunnyOrDie.com. WINNER: Don Hein
53	5	"Rock of Ages"	April 8, 2012	WS0505H
Get ready to rock as four cupcake bakers battle to take the stage at the Los Angeles opening of the Broadway smash hit "Rock of Ages." WINNER: Megan Faulkner Brown
54	6	"Yo Gabba Gabba"	April 18, 2012	WS0506H
The men of Cupcake Wars go to battle as four returning bakers compete for a place at the VIP party for the hit show "Yo Gabba Gabba Live." WINNER: Kevin Vandeera
55	7	"Derby Dolls"	April 22, 2012	WS0507H
Four bakers try to elbow past the competition for a chance to bring their cupcakes to a party celebrating the Los Angeles Derby Dolls. WINNER: Michelle Brown
56	8	"L.A. Marathon"	June 17, 2012	WS0508H
It's a race to the finish line as four cupcake bakers fight for a place at a VIP party celebrating the 2012 Los Angeles Marathon. WINNER: Lorre Jacobs Daniel
57	9	"Hollywood Black Film Festival"	June 24, 2012	WS0509H
Four talented cupcake bakers compete to serve their cupcakes to the stars at an exclusive party for the Hollywood Black Film Festival. WINNER: Sabrina Rodriguez
58	10	"Tony Hawk"	July 8, 2012	WS0510H
Four cupcake bakers try to skate their way into the Tony Hawk Foundation's celebrity event in Las Vegas. WINNER: Jenica Braddock
59	11	"Country Music Awards"	April 29, 2012	WS0511H
Cupcakes go country as four returning bakers, who all lost in previous Cupcake Wars, come back to battle for redemption and a place at the star-studded after party for the Country Music Awards. WINNER: Bill Jones
60	12	"Saluting the USO"	July 1, 2012	WS0512H
Four returning Cupcake Wars champions come back to prove themselves the best of the best and serve their cupcakes at a black tie gala celebrating the 70th anniversary of the USO. WINNER: Anthony Valerio
61	13	"Renaissance Faire"	May 6, 2012	WS0513H
It's a blast from the past as four cupcake bakers fight for a place at the VIP party for the 50th anniversary of the Renaissance Faire in Los Angeles. WINNER: Ady Abreu

=== Season 6 (2012) ===
No. overall	No. in season	Title	Original release date	Prod. code
62	1	"Cupcake Champions: Spider-Man: Turn Off the Dark"	May 13, 2012	WS0601H
Kicking off the Champions series, our first four returning bakers will compete against each other for the chance to serve their super hero cupcakes at a VIP party for the most talked about show on Broadway, Spider-Man: Turn off the Dark.
63	2	"Cupcake Champions: Madagascar 3"	May 20, 2012	WS0602H
Four former champions are going Hollywood for this episode of Cupcake Wars. They will be competing against each other for the chance to have their cupcakes featured at a special VIP party for Madagascar 3.
64	3	"Cupcake Champions: Glee"	May 27, 2012	WS0603H
Our bakers will have to be in perfect pitch if they want to win the chance to serve their champion cupcakes at a cast and crew party for one of the most popular shows on TV, Fox's Glee.
65	4	"Cupcake Champions: Pixar's Brave"	June 3, 2012	WS0604H
In this last heat, four bakers will need to have perfect aim if they want to win a chance to serve their cupcakes at a huge party celebrating Disney and Pixar's animated film Brave.
66	5	"Cupcake Champions: Grand Finale"	June 10, 2012	WS0605H
It's the final leg of the Cupcake Champions Series and four bakers will put it all on the line for a chance to be named the ultimate cupcake champion and win $50,000! They will also serve their cupcakes at an exclusive party in New York City celebrating the release of Food Network's Cupcake app. It is a very special episode.
67	6	"Kate Walsh's Billionaire Boyfriend"	July 15, 2012	WS0606H
Four bakers will compete for the opportunity to serve their cupcakes at a VIP party celebrating the release of "Private Practice" star Kate Walsh's fragrance, Billionaire Boyfriend. Kate Walsh judges.
68	7	"Angry Birds"	July 29, 2012	WS0607H
Cupcakes will fly as four competitors fight for the chance to have their cupcakes featured at a huge kickoff party for the Angry Birds Space app in Seattle.
69	8	"WildAid Save the Tigers"	August 5, 2012	WS0608H
It's going to get wild in the kitchen as four bakers fight for the chance to serve their cupcakes at a huge celebrity gala honoring animal conservation group, WildAid. Actress Minnie Driver judges.
70	9	"Kristin Cavallari's Baby Shower"	August 12, 2012	WS0609H
Television star Kristin Cavallari will be expecting great cupcakes as four talented bakers compete to serve their sweet treats at her star-studded baby shower.
71	10	"Cupcakes for the Queen"	August 19, 2012	WS0610H
It will be a British Invasion of the sweet kind when four English bakers fight for the chance to have their cupcakes featured at an exclusive party celebrating Queen Elizabeth's Diamond Jubilee.
72	11	"A Perfect Match.com"	August 26, 2012	WS0611H
It will be happily ever after for one cupcake maker when they win the opportunity to serve their cupcakes at a spectacular Match.com wedding event.
73	12	"America's Cup-Cake"	September 2, 2012	WS0612H
Four cupcake makers will fight to stay afloat and win the opportunity to have their cupcakes featured at an exclusive party honoring the oldest trophy race in sports, the America's Cup.
74	13	"Star Wars"	September 9, 2012	WS0613H
Four talented bakers will have to use the force if they want to win the chance to serve their cupcakes at a VIP party celebrating the beloved Star Wars franchise.
75	14	"Adam Sandler's Hotel Transylvania"	September 23, 2012	WS0614ZH
It's going to get scary in the kitchen as four bakers fight for the chance to be featured at a celebrity studded party celebrating the release of Adam Sandler's animated film, Hotel Transylvania.

=== Season 7 (2012–13) ===
No. overall	No. in season	Title	Original release date	Prod. code
76	1	"Big Time Rush"	October 7, 2012	WS0701H
It's going to be big time competition as four bakers fight for the chance to serve their cupcakes backstage at an exclusive party for the boys of Big Time Rush.
77	2	"Mary Poppins"	October 14, 2012	WS0702H
Four bakers will need more than a "Spoonful of Sugar" if they want to win the opportunity to serve their cupcakes at a cast and crew party for the Los Angeles premiere of the musical "Mary Poppins."
78	3	"Cody Simpson"	October 21, 2012	WS0703H
Mother knows best as four mother-daughter teams compete for the chance to go backstage with pop idol Cody Simpson and serve their cupcakes at an exclusive fan event.
79	4	"Magical Cupcakes"	October 28, 2012	WS0704H
Bakers will be trading in their whisks for wands as they duke it out to win the opportunity to have their cupcakes center stage at an exclusive event at the world famous Magic Castle in Los Angeles.
80	5	"Teenage Mutant Ninja Turtles"	November 4, 2012	WS0705H
Four bakers, all husband and wife teams, will have to become ninjas in the kitchen in order to win the battle to serve their cupcakes at a cast and crew party for the new animated series.
81	6	"The All-American Rejects"	March 10, 2013	WS0706H
Four returning bakers, all looking at a second chance to win Cupcake Wars, will have to hit just the right note if they want to have their cupcakes featured at a VIP party for the platinum selling band, The All-American Rejects.
82	7	"Cheerleader Cupcakes"	November 11, 2012	WS0707H
Cupcakes will fly as four competitors fight for the chance to serve their cupcakes at a huge celebration honoring the country's best cheerleaders.
83	8	"Cupcakes on Parade"	December 6, 2012	WS0708H
'Tis the season for cupcakes as four bakers compete for the opportunity to serve their cupcakes at a VIP party for the Magnificent Mile Lights Festival Parade in Chicago.
84	9	"The King of Cupcakes"	November 18, 2012	WS0709H
A whole lotta shakin' will be going on in the kitchen as four cupcake makers fight for the chance to serve their cupcakes at an exclusive party in Memphis celebrating The King, Elvis Presley.
85	10	"The Young and The Restless"	March 24, 2013	WS0710H
Expect many twists and turns in the kitchen when four cupcake makers face off to for the chance to be featured at an exclusive cast and crew party celebrating the 10,000th episode of the classic soap, The Young and the Restless.
86	11	"Rock and Roll Cupcakes"	March 31, 2013	WS0711H
The bad boys of Cupcake Wars will return to the kitchen in true rock and roll fashion to compete for the chance to have their cupcakes front and center at a party celebrating the I Heart Radio music festival in Las Vegas.
87	12	"San Diego Zoo"	March 3, 2013	WS0712H
The fur will be flying as four bakers fight for the opportunity to serve their cupcakes at a members only party at the world famous San Diego Zoo.
88	13	"Aloha Cupcakes"	March 17, 2013	WS0713H
Four bakers will have to "lei" it all on the line if they want to win the chance to serve their cupcakes at the Hawaii Food and Wine Festival in Oahu.

=== Season 8 (2013) ===
No. overall	No. in season	Title	Original release date	Prod. code
89	1	"Fan Favorites"	April 14, 2013	WS0801H
Four all-star bakers, handpicked by the fans, will compete for the chance to serve their cupcakes at a celebrity-packed charity gala hosted by guest judge, 'N Sync's Lance Bass.
90	2	""Weird Al" Yankovic"	April 7, 2013	WS0802H
It's going to get a little weird in the Cupcake Wars kitchen when four competitors try to bake their way to an exclusive book release party for iconic comedian, and guest judge, "Weird Al" Yankovic.
91	3	"People's Choice Awards"	April 21, 2013	WS0803H
The viewers will be choosing the ingredients for this special episode of Cupcake Wars, where four bakers compete for the opportunity to be front and center at a celebrity packed VIP party for The People's Choice Awards. The People's Choice Awards president, Fred Nelson, serves as guest judge.
92	4	"Tiffani Thiessen's Birthday Bash"	April 28, 2013	WS0804H
Four returning bakers will be getting a second chance at the winner's title as they battle it out to serve their cupcakes at a birthday party for the star of White Collar, Beverly Hills 90210 and Saved by the Bell actress and guest judge, Tiffani Thiessen.
93	5	"South Beach Wine and Food Festival"	May 5, 2013	WS0805H
Four bakers are returning for redemption and a chance to serve their winning cupcakes alongside world-renowned chefs at one of the most exclusive food events in the country, The South Beach Wine and Food Festival in Miami. Food Network's "Sandwich King," Jeff Mauro, is the guest judge.
94	6	"Ace of Cupcakes"	May 12, 2013	Unavailable
Four bakers fight to serve at a party for the launch of website HollywoodPoker.com. Actress Mimi Rogers serves as the guest judge.
95	7	"Cosmic Cupcakes"	May 19, 2013	WS0807H
Expect out of this world creations when four bakers compete for the chance to launch their cupcakes into the stratosphere at a black tie gala celebrating the arrival of Space Shuttle Endeavour in Los Angeles. California Science Center curator, Dr. Kenneth Phillips, serves as the guest judge.
96	8	"The Harlem Globetrotters"	May 26, 2013	WS0808H
Four cupcake makers are going to have to pull out all their baking tricks if they want to win the chance to have their cupcakes center court at a huge fan event for the world famous Harlem Globetrotters. Globetrotter Herbert "Flight Time" Lang serves as the guest judge.
97	9	"Fran Drescher's Cancer Schmancer"	June 9, 2013	WS0809H
Four vegan competitors will battle it out for the opportunity to serve their cupcakes at an exclusive party for iconic television star — and guest judge — Fran Drescher's charity, Cancer Schmancer.
98	10	"Comedy Cupcakes"	June 16, 2013	WS0810H
Four bakers are going to have to bring the funny — and the tasty — if they want to be front and center at a celebrity packed VIP party for Variety magazine's Power of Comedy. Celebrity publicist Jennifer Styles serves as the guest judge.
99	11	"Cupcakes 'R' Us"	June 23, 2013	WS0811H
Four imaginative bakers are going to have to unleash their inner child as they compete for the chance to serve their creations at a black tie awards gala for the Chicago Toy and Game Fair. Toy inventor Nancy Zwiers serves as the guest judge.
100	12	"Blue Man Group"	July 7, 2013	WS0812H
Former baker's assistants will be returning to take their place in the spotlight as they battle it out for the chance to have their cupcakes featured at a VIP Las Vegas party for the world-renowned Blue Man Group. Phil Stanton, Creator of the Blue Man Group, serves as the guest judge.
101	13	"Taylor Dayne's '80s Party"	June 30, 2013	WS0813H
It's going to be, like, totally awesome when four bakers go back in time and battle it out for the chance to serve their cupcakes at a VIP kid's birthday party for '80s pop music icon, and guest judge, Taylor Dayne.

=== Season 9 (2013) ===
No. overall	No. in season	Title	Original release date	Prod. code
102	1	"Jessica Alba: The Honest Company"	September 7, 2013	WS0901H
Four talented cupcake bakers fight to win over special guest judge Jessica Alba, as they face off for $10,000 and the chance to have their all-natural organic cupcakes at the center of a party launching the new headquarters for her brand, The Honest Company.
103	2	"Marilyn Monroe's 60th"	September 14, 2013	WS0902H
Four returning cupcake bakers, who have previously gone home empty-handed, go to war for the chance to bring their cupcakes to a huge event honoring the 60th anniversary of Marilyn Monroe's hand prints at the world-famous TCL Chinese Theater. They'll have to impress guest judge Nick Woodhouse, President of Marilyn Monroe's estate, if they want to walk away with $10,000.
104	3	"WWE SummerSlam"	September 21, 2013	WS0903H
The bad girls of Cupcake Wars battle to win the hearts of special guest judges, WWE Diva's Alicia Fox and Layla. At stake is a chance to bring their cupcakes to WWE's SummerSlam, as well as a $10,000 prize.
105	4	"The Wizard of Oz"	September 28, 2013	WS0904H
There's no place like home as four cupcake bakers face off for the chance to celebrate the re-release of The Wizard of Oz and the $10,000 prize. The guest judge is legendary film critic, Leonard Maltin.
106	5	"Annie the Musical"	October 5, 2013	WS0905H
The sun will come out tomorrow, but four bakers had better get their cupcakes out faster than that if they want to make it to the Great White Way! They'll fight for the chance to have their cupcakes at the center of party celebrating the revival of Annie the Musical. The winner walks away with $10,000.
107	6	"L.A. Bridal Bash"	October 12, 2013	WS0906H
Four teams of mother-daughter bakers fight to have their delicious cupcakes at the center of a Los Angeles bridal bash, hosted by legendary high-end wedding planner Kristin Banta. The winner also walks away with $10,000.
108	7	"Hanson"	October 19, 2013	WS0907H
Four cupcake bakers fight to the finish for the chance at having their cupcakes at a concert and after party for the band Hanson and a $10,000 prize. To get there, they must win over three special guest judges: Isaac, Zac and Taylor Hanson!
109	8	"Rob Zombie's Great American Nightmare"	October 26, 2013	WS0908H
Four cupcake bakers fight to win over the master of horror himself, Rob Zombie. The winner's vegan cupcakes will be the centerpiece of the grand opening of Rob Zombie's latest venture, a month-long haunted music attraction called the Great American Nightmare. It all begins with the high-stakes taste challenge, where the bakers must create a delicious cupcake out of foods so spicy they're rumored to cause nightmares!
110	9	"Barbie"	November 9, 2013	WS0909H
Barbie is moving to a new dream house, and four extraordinary bakers with a long history of winning Cupcake Wars championships are coming back to battle to get their cupcakes at the center of the festivities! Lisa McKnight, Vice President of Mattel's North American division is on hand to help determine which baker deserves the $10,000 prize.
111	10	"Miss America"	November 2, 2013	WS0910H
The Miss America Pageant is making its triumphant return to Atlantic City, and four talented cupcake bakers vie for the chance to have their cupcakes at the center of the action. To get there, they must first win over a special guest judge, reigning Miss America, Mallory Hagan. The winner also walks away with $10,000.
112	11	"Aquarium of the Pacific"	November 23, 2013	WS0911H
Four cupcake bakers vie for the chance to bring their cupcakes to a celebration of Explorer's Day at the Aquarium of the Pacific. To get there, they must first face down the taste challenge: create a delicious cupcake out of sustainable seafood! Oceanographer, Captain Don Walsh, helps determine which baker will take the $10,000 prize.
113	12	"Match.com"	November 16, 2013	WS0912H
Love is in the air as four bakers battle for the chance to bring their cupcakes to one of Match.com's exclusive Stir Events in Los Angeles. To get there, they must first tackle a difficult taste challenge -- to unite men's favorite foods like cheeseburgers or jalapeno poppers, with women's favorites like chamomile and chocolate covered strawberries, to make a cupcake match made in heaven. The winner will also take home a $10,000 prize.
114	13	"Breeders' Cup"	December 28, 2013	WS0913H
It's the mother of all horse races, as four cupcake bakers vie for the chance to have their cupcakes at the center of the legendary Breeders' Cup World Championships. To get there, they must win over guest judge Bo Derek, iconic actress, model and Breeders' Cup Ambassador. At stake is a $10,000 prize. Note: This is the last episode to feature Justin Willman as host and Candace Nelson as judge.

=== Season 10 (2016) ===
No. overall	No. in season	Title	Original release date	Prod. code
115	1	"Celebrity: Atari Cupcakes"	April 11, 2016	WSSP02H
Get ready for an all-star cupcake showdown as Mel B, Mayim Bialik, Andy Dick and Jennie Garth battle to prove their baking dominance and have their cupcakes featured at an epic party celebrating the first and most famous video game platform of all time: Atari! These four might be VIPs in the real world, but they'll face the same Cupcake Wars gauntlet as any other baker and be eliminated one by one with the help of guest judge and CEO of Atari, Fred Chesnais. The last celebrity standing earns bragging rights and a donation to their charity of choice.
116	2	"Celebrity: Can You Spell Cupcake?"	April 18, 2016	WSSP03H
Celebrities Joey Lawrence, Holly Madison, Matt Moy and Dita Von Teese throw down to prove that their cupcakes take the cake as they create show-stopping treats for a party celebrating the Scripps National Spelling Bee. Co-champions of the 2015 National Spelling Bee Vanya Shivashankar and Gokul Venkatachalam will help eliminate the celebs until the last one standing walks away with bragging rights and a donation to their favorite charity.
117	3	"Celebrity: Cupcakes in Space"	April 25, 2016	WSSP04H
It's an all-star cupcake showdown as celebrities Greer Grammar, Maria Menounos, AJ Michalka and Tamera Mowry battle it out to prove that their cupcakes reign supreme. These four stars will have to shine bright to have their cupcakes featured at a galactic blowout celebrating the end of astronaut Scott Kelly's one-year mission in orbit, the longest in history! Bobak Ferdowski from NASA's Jet Propulsion Laboratory is on hand to choose which celebrity wins bragging rights and a donation to their charity of choice.
118	4	"Ultimate Showdown: Cirque du Soleil Cupcakes"	May 2, 2016	WSSP06H
Get ready for a cupcake battle royale as four of the best Cupcake Wars bakers of all time face off in a one-of-a-kind baking adventure to have their cupcakes at the center of an epic party celebrating Cirque du Soleil. The bakers will face three grueling rounds, where the only way to survive is to create cupcakes that are mind-blowing, risk-taking works of edible art with larger-than-life, gravity-defying displays. Artistic director of Cirque du Soleil's Mystere, Tim Smith, is on hand to help crown a winner.
119	5	"Kids Vs. Adults: DC Comics Superhero Girls"	May 9, 2016	WSSP05H
It's a cupcake showdown packed with a massive shocking twist as two unsuspecting adult bakers discover that they've been pitted against two child cupcake prodigies as they compete have their cupcakes featured at a party celebrating the DC Super Hero Girls. These junior bakers might be too young to drive, but they've got the baking skills to take down any adult, and guest judges Ashley Eckstein and Shea Fontana from DC Super Hero Girls will help choose the last baker standing and award the $10,000 prize.
120	6	"Celebrity: Cheerleader Cupcakes"	July 11, 2016	WSSP07H
It's time to "Go! Fight! Win!" as Perez Hilton, Audrina Patridge, Lea Thompson and Nick Young battle for cupcake dominance and compete to have their cupcakes at the center of a party celebrating the nation's champion cheerleaders and their coaches. Kristine Cather, director of marketing for the United Spirit Association, will help decide which celebrity takes home bragging rights and a donation to their favorite charity.
121	7	"Celebrity: Hello Cupcakes"	July 18, 2016	WSSP08H
It's time for cute overload as Shawn Johnson, NeNe Leakes, Lamorne Morris and Johnny Weir wage a celebrity cupcake battle royale for the chance to have their creations at the center of a massive party celebrating Hello Kitty, the globally-beloved icon of fashion and friendship. Fashion designer Betsey Johnson serves as guest judge in this winner-take-all battle, as the last celeb standing walks away with a donation to their favorite charity.
122	8	"Celebrity: Josie and The Pussycats"	July 25, 2016	WSSP09H
Celebrities Adrienne Bailon and Julissa Bermudez, Charlie and Max Carver, Ron Funches, and Katherine McNamara and Emeraude Toubia fight to create show-stopping cupcakes for party celebrating comic book rock icons Josie and the Pussycats. If these stars are looking for VIP treatment, they've come to the wrong place, because they'll be eliminated one by one until the last celeb standing walks away with bragging rights and a donation to their favorite charity. Jesse Goldwater, creative consultant for Archie Comics, joins the panel as guest judge.
123	9	"Celebrity: Medieval Cupcakes"	August 1, 2016	WSSP10H
Four celebrity bakers are about to get medieval, as Yvette Nicole Brown, Brooke Burke-Charvet, Carson Kressley and Vanessa Marano battle to prove that their cupcakes reign supreme. In this winner-take-all battle, they compete to have their cupcakes featured at a blowout party celebrating the 30th anniversary of Medieval Times, with special judging help from Medieval Times cast members Lou Klein and Julie McCurdie!
124	10	"Celebrity: Twister"	August 8, 2016	WSSP11H
It's an all-star cupcake showdown as Coolio, Hannah Hart and Grace Helbig, Antonio Sabato Jr. and Molly Sims compete to have their cupcakes featured at a blowout party celebrating the 50th anniversary of the iconic game Twister! Only one celebrity can win the bragging rights and a donation to their favorite charity. Jen Boswinkel, senior director of marketing for gaming at Hasbro, serves as guest judge.
125	11	"Celebrity: Matilda"	August 15, 2016	WSSP12H
Drake Bell, Lori Greiner, Bob Harper and Heather Morris battle to prove their celebrity cupcake dominance and create show-stopping cupcakes for a party celebrating the wonder and whimsy of Roald Dahl's classic story, Matilda. They'll be eliminated one by one with help from guest judge Chloe Dahl, granddaughter of Roald Dahl, until the last celeb standing walks away with bragging rights and a donation to their favorite charity.
