= Cupcake Wars =

- Genre: Reality television Cooking show
- Presented by: Justin Willman (2009-2013); Jonathan Bennett (2016-2018)
- Judges: Candace Nelson (2009-2013); Florian Bellanger (2009-2018); Waylynn Lucas (2016-2018)
- Country of origin: United States
- Original language: English
- No. of seasons: 11
- No. of episodes: 137 (list of episodes)

Production
- Producers: Adam Cohen; Cara Tapper; Joanna Vernetti
- Running time: 1 hour

Original release
- Network: Food Network
- Release: December 27, 2009 – May 22, 2018

Cupcake Wars is an American reality competition series that premiered on December 27, 2009, on cable television network Food Network. The show, featuring unique and professional-style cupcakes, was hosted by Justin Willman and later by Jonathan Bennett.

The show was similar to Chopped, a cooking show aired on the same network, in that it starts with four contestants then eliminated one-by-one during three rounds, with the winning team receiving $10,000 and the opportunity to be featured in an upcoming event. Each team consists of a primary baker and a supporting baker.

== Rounds ==
The first round lasts 45 minutes and is focused on taste. Contestants must create a cupcake with unusual ingredients related to a theme – for example, a date-night theme might require contestants to incorporate various aphrodisiacs, such as oysters, basil, dark chocolate, or champagne.

The second round lasts 75 minutes and is based on both taste and presentation. Contestants must make three different types of cupcakes of their own choice with a unique presentation that relates to the theme.

In the third and final round, the remaining two teams make 1,000 cupcakes in two hours. Each team must feature improved versions of the four cupcakes they made in the first two rounds and must showcase them on an elaborately constructed display. Both the cupcakes and the display must remain consistent with the episode's theme. Each team receives the assistance of four baking assistants and one carpenter in completing the round.

=== Themes ===
The show invites cupcake bakers from all over the United States to compete. Each episode is centered on a theme or event; past themes include a Seaworld birthday party for an orca, a "match-making" aphrodisiac party, an Ace of Cakes 100th episode celebration, "Survival of the Fittest" theme, an autism charity event, a golf tournament, and a film festival.

=== Judges ===
There are three judges in the series, with two of them serving as permanent judges:

- Candace Nelson, founder of Sprinkles Cupcakes, the world's first cupcake bakery (in episode 6 and episode 7 of season 7, Bobbie Lloyd, Chief Baking Officer of Magnolia Bakery filled in for Nelson)
- Florian Bellanger, executive French pastry chef
- The third, rotating judge, is a special guest and is associated with the event in which that episode's winning cupcakes are to be served.

Nelson and Bellanger usually give the bakers technical critiques on the methods, amounts, and ingredients they use, while the guest judges' critiques are usually much more subjective, based on whether or not they liked the cupcakes.

== Episodes ==
Season	Episodes	Originally released	
Season	Episodes	First released	Last released
1	9	December 27, 2009	August 3, 2010
2	13	December 7, 2010	March 8, 2011
3	13	June 14, 2011	September 11, 2011
4	13	December 4, 2011	March 4, 2012
5	13	March 11, 2012	June 24, 2012
6	14	May 13, 2012	September 23, 2012
7	13	October 7, 2012	March 24, 2013
8	13	April 7, 2013	July 7, 2013
9	13	September 7, 2013	December 28, 2013
10	11	April 11, 2016	August 15, 2016
11	12	November 28, 2017	May 22, 2018

== See also ==
- Cake Wars
