= Dream Maker =

- Created by: Dianne Victor
- Directed by: Asher Levin
- Starring: Audrina Patridge; Rory Kramer; Lisa Mason Lee
- Country of origin: United States
- Original language: English
- No. of episodes: 13

Production
- Producer: YOBI.tv

Original release
- Release: June 21 – September 13, 2011

Dream Maker is a webseries that stars Audrina Patridge as an up-and-coming talent manager who moves from Hollywood to Detroit to start her own talent agency. Written and directed by Asher Levin and produced by YOBI.tv, the series follows the adventures of Tracy Jacobs (Audrina Patridge), her assistant Jason Smith (Rory Kramer), and her receptionist Jamie Johnson (Lisa Mason Lee) as they discover, sign, and send their clients on to stardom.

Much of the initial press given to the series focused on the fact that Audrina's co-stars and other members of the Dream Maker cast and crew are winners of the various online talent contests hosted by YOBI.tv.

Audrina Patridge might be the marquee name driving YOBI.tv’s new Michigan-produced online Web series "Dream Maker," but the reality TV veteran said it’s her cast mates and behind-the-scenes crew members who are the real stars of the project.

Among those joining Patridge on-camera are YOBIAct winners Rory Kramer and Lisa Mason Lee, YOBILaugh winners Joshua David Evans and Gisele Noel, YOBISing winners Kari Fleskes and Janick Thibault, and YOBIFilm winner Tal Haring. The contest winners working behind the camera are YOBIPics winner Chris Ebarb and YOBIFilm winners Tal Haring and Paul Kurti.

== Production ==
Dream Maker was filmed in early June 2011 at a variety of locations in and around Detroit. Behind the scenes photos as well as video commentaries from the cast and crew are available on the official Dream Maker production blog.

== Episodes ==
Episode 1 - Tracy Leaves L.A. to Make Dreams Come True in the D
On a sunny L.A. morning, fledgling talent manager Tracy James has an epiphany in a local gym. Along with her irreplaceable and trusted assistant, Jason, she decides to relocate to Detroit to help jump-start the emerging entertainment business.
Release date, 21 June 2011

Episode 2 - The Dream Maker Talent Management Firm Is Now Open
Tracy and her team have now set up shop in Detroit and are open for business. As Tracy takes on a slew of new hopefuls, Jamie is shocked to learn a secret that Jason has been hiding.
Release date, 28 June 2011

Episode 3 - Dream Maker Signs Its First Client
Tensions rise between Jason and Jamie as the team searches for new ways to discover fresh talent in the Motor City. Unfazed by the office drama, Tracy pushes forward with plans to turn a new client into a shining star.
Release date, 5 July 2011

Episode 4 - Dream Maker Must Prioritize Its Dream List
Phones are ringing off the hook while Jamie pursues questionable endeavors during work hours. Unwilling to give up on Kari and her stage fright, Tracy is absent from the office and leaves Jason to pick up all of the slack.
Release date, 12 July 2011

Episode 5 - Dream Maker Scouts Hot New Internet Sensation
The team reviews Jason's new talent find. Tracy has some mixed feelings about the potential client.
Release date, 19 July 2011

Episode 6 - Dream Maker Prepares Its First Production
Tracy leads her team of clients into the production of a music video. Jason assigns Jamie with the task of booking auditions for Josh, the new talent.
Release date, 26 July 2011

Episode 7 - Dream Maker Squad ~ The Music Video
Despite any confusion in her instructions, Tracy's team successfully produces a music video entitled "Dream Maker Squad."
Release date, 2 August 2011

Episode 8 - Dream Maker Pursues New Deals for Current Clients
Tracy impatiently awaits feedback on the viral status of the music video that her team created. After conquering her stage fright at a recent gig, Kari prepares to endure another show that Tracy has booked for her. Meanwhile, Jason accompanies Josh to an important business meeting to ensure that the "Strudel" star behaves himself.
Release date, 9 August 2011

Episode 9 - Dream Maker Pushes the Limits
Tracy invites a pair of top record producers to Kari's next big show without first gaining approval from the stage-frightened star. Jamie is left alone to tend to the office while Jason and Josh attend their business meeting with a large corporation. During the pitch, Josh brings several unconventional ideas to the table to seal the deal for an upcoming marketing campaign.
Release date, 16 Aug 2011

Episode 10 -Dream Maker Aims to Expand
With a solid roster of clients added to her team, Tracy works overtime to find additional hidden talent on the streets of Detroit. The relationship between Jamie and Jason becomes heated after a secret kiss they shared on the night of Kari's big show.
Release date, 23 August 2011

Episode 11 -Dream Maker Gears Up New Projects
Jealous of new client Gisele's ability to book gigs, Jamie sets out on a mission to make a name for herself. Tracy discovers that Gisele may have some issues in common with Kari. Meanwhile, Tal is set to direct a music video with Janick, an emerging young rock musician.
Release date, 30 August 2011

Episode 12 - Dream Maker Looks to the Future for Success
Three months of endless hard work and dedication result in numerous exciting changes for Tracy's clients. Jamie and Jason run into a roadblock in their relationship while Tracy faces an ethical dilemma on how to deal with her own feelings for a certain client.
Release date, 6 September 2011

Episode 13 - Dream Maker Is Tempted with a New Business Venture
Tracy is propositioned with an alluring business offer that would require her to return to LA immediately. The fate of her Detroit clients and their new careers rest on the decision Tracy is forced to make.
Release date, 13 September 2011

== Soundtrack ==
The Dream Maker soundtrack was released on 25 August 2011. The five artists appearing on the soundtrack are the winners of the YOBI.tv Season 3 YOBISing contest.

Songs

- "I Wish I May" by Kari Fleskes
- "Home" by Kari Fleskes
- "Broken Knees" by Kari Fleskes
- "Crazy Person Pill" by Kari Fleskes
- "Wouldn’t We Be Something" By Kari Fleskes
- "Breaking Apart" by Janick Thibault
- "All I Want" by Janick Thibault
- "Stand or Fall" by Janick Thibault
- "Turn the Page" by Janick Thibault
- "Dreaming Clear" by Michael Barlow
- "Rain" by Joey Diamond
- "Hide Your Head in Shame" by Katee Lee

Bonus Tracks

Two additional tracks -- "I’m In Love with a Strudel" and "Dream Maker Squad," both by series co-star Joshua David Evans—are available exclusively on the Dream Maker website in exchange for a tweet.
